= Walter E. Piatt =

American Army general

- Walter E. Piatt
- Born: September 12, 1961 (age 65); Homestead, Pennsylvania, U.S.
- Military career
- Allegiance: United States
- Branch: United States Army
- Service years: 1979–1983; 1987–2024
- Rank: Lieutenant General
- Commands: 10th Mountain Division; Joint Multinational Training Command; United States Army Infantry Center; 3rd Brigade Combat Team, 25th Infantry Division
- Known for: Chief Executive Officer, Wounded Warrior Project
- Conflicts: Iraq War; War in Afghanistan; Operation Inherent Resolve
- Awards: Army Distinguished Service Medal (3); Defense Superior Service Medal; Legion of Merit (5); Bronze Star Medal (5)
- Website: Official webpage

Walter E. Piatt (born September 12, 1961) is a retired United States Army lieutenant general appointed chief executive officer of Wounded Warrior Project, a nonprofit organization that provides programs and services for veterans and their families, a position he assumed on March 18, 2024. He last served as the 57th Director of the Army Staff from 2019 to 2024. He enlisted in the army in 1979 and served four years as an infantryman. After graduating from Lock Haven University, he was commissioned as a second lieutenant in 1987. Prior to assuming his current position, Piatt was the Commanding General, 10th Mountain Division at Fort Drum. His other assignments as a general officer include serving as the 52nd Chief of Infantry; Deputy Commanding General-Support, 10th Mountain Division; Commander, Joint Multinational Training Command; Deputy Commanding General, United States Army Europe; and director of Operations/director, Rapid Equipment Fielding, Army Rapid Capabilities Office.

== General Officer assignments ==
General Officer assignments
Start	End	Assignment
May 2019	January 2024	Director of the Army Staff, United States Army, Washington, DC
Apr 17	May 19	Commanding General, 10th Mountain Division (Light) and Fort Drum, Fort Drum, New York and Operation Inherent Resolve, Iraq
Sep 16	Apr 17	Director of Operations/Director, Rapid Equipment Fielding, Army Rapid Capabilities Office, Office of the Assistant Secretary of the Army (Acquisition, Logistics and Technology), Washington, DC
Mar 15	Jul 16	Director, Operations, Readiness and Mobilization, G-3/5/7, United States Army, Washington, DC
Jul 14	Mar 15	Deputy Commanding General, United States Army Europe, Germany
Jun 13	Jul 14	Commanding General, Joint Multinational Training Command, United States Army Europe, Germany
Jun 12	Jun 13	Deputy Commanding General (Support), 10th Mountain Division (Light), Fort Drum, New York

== General Officer dates of rank ==
General Officer date of rank
Rank	Date
Lieutenant General	30 May 2019
Major General	2 Mar 2015
Brigadier General	2 Oct 2012

== Wounded Warrior Project ==
Since becoming chief executive officer of Wounded Warrior Project in 2024, Piatt has emphasized veteran recovery and reintegration into civilian life.

In discussing the organization's 2025 Warrior Survey, he highlighted the ongoing challenges affecting veterans, including mental health concerns, sleep challenges, unemployment, and access to care. He also emphasized support services, suicide prevention efforts, and programs promoting veterans' economic stability and well-being.

Piatt has also discussed Wounded Warrior Project's Soldier Ride program, an adaptive cycling program for veterans. The organization continues to host Soldier Ride events nationwide, including rides in the Florida Keys and the 2026 Soldier Ride 250 event from Jacksonville, Florida, to New York City.

== Mindfulness training ==
While a colonel (brigade commander, 25th Infantry Division), Piatt's unit had some 200 volunteers participate in a mindfulness study by Amishi Jha and Elizabeth Stanley in the 2010s; the Uniformed Services University of the Health Sciences notes that this mental practice "teaches the brain to stay 'in the moment'" which helps soldiers reduce the pain and stress of PTSD. The project is known as the STRONG Project (Schofield Barracks Training and Research on Neurobehavioral Growth).

Piatt also incorporates mindfulness into his professional life. While commander of coalition forces in Iraq, Piatt regularly engaged in mindfulness practices such as meditation and breathing exercises. In an interview with the New York Times, he emphasized that mindfulness is crucial for understanding the practical benefits of compassion and empathy.

On August 30, 2022, Piatt spoke at The American Legion 103rd National Convention at the Milwaukee Center in Milwaukee. He spoke about his service in Afghanistan, army enlistment trends, and "Be the One," which is The American Legion's new veteran suicide prevention campaign.

== Publications ==
Walter E. Piatt wrote She Came to the Door to Wave Good-bye ...: A Soldier's Thoughts About Family, Life and the War in Afghanistan, published in January 2003. The book reflects on his personal experiences and the impact of military service on his family and life.

In January 2006, Piatt published Paktika: The Story of the 2nd Battalion 27th Infantry "Wolfhounds" in Paktika, Afghanistan, which combines short prose passages with poetry to recount the experiences and emotional challenges faced by the Wolfhounds during their deployment in Paktika Province, Afghanistan.

== January 6, 2021 ==
Prior to January 6, 2021, Pentagon officials repeatedly asked city and federal officials if they needed assistance from the D.C. National Guard, but only the Mayor of Washington, D.C. requested assistance from 340 unarmed service members. At approximately 2:20 p.m. on January 6, LTG Piatt joined a phone call with Washington, D.C. leaders, Capitol Police leaders, the D.C. National Guard, and others as the riot at the Capitol was unfolding. The Hill reported that Piatt said on the call that Secretary of the Army Ryan D. McCarthy was meeting with Secretary of Defense Christopher C. Miller to seek approval of the request for assistance. He also explained that he was not the decision maker and that no one was denying the request for assistance. The New York Times reported that during Congressional testimony on February 23, 2021, former Capitol security leaders provided conflicting accounts of the request for the National Guard, reflecting the confusion of the event and the complexity of requesting Guard assistance.

On January 6, 2021, during the storming of the United States Capitol and an hour and a half after the west side defensive perimeter had been breached, according to Capitol Police Chief Steven Sund and DC National Guard leader Maj. Gen. William J. Walker, Piatt critically delayed or ignored Sund's request for National Guard support, stating, "I don't like the visual of the National Guard standing a police line with the Capitol in the background," despite this being a stark contrast to the protests of the previous year. According to the Washington Post, "Piatt initially denied Sund's allegations in a statement but acknowledged in a call with reporters about two weeks later that he had conferred with others who were present that it was possible he made comments to that effect."

On March 8, 2021, retired Army Lt. Gen Russel Honoré, whom House Speaker Nancy Pelosi (D-Calif.) tasked with leading the security review, identified that the U.S. Capitol Police are too "understaffed, insufficiently equipped, and inadequately trained" — and woefully lacking in intelligence capabilities.

On June 15, 2021, Piatt told the House Committee on Oversight and Reform that Army officials "all immediately understood the gravity of the situation" after receiving a request in a conference call for "urgent and immediate support" at the Capitol, but that they still needed to develop a plan. Piatt acknowledged that "those on the line were convinced that I was denying their request, despite [me] clearly stating three times that, 'We are not denying your requests. We need to prepare a plan for when the secretary of the Army gains approval….’". Piatt's statement that he did not have authority to act was supported by D.C. National Guard's commanding general, Maj. Gen. William Walker, when he said that newly installed Secretary of the Army Ryan D. McCarthy, a Trump appointee, had instituted unusual restrictions, requiring employment of the quick-reaction force to be approved by the chain of command, which prevented a rapid deployment of the D.C. National Guard. McCarthy's approval did not come until 4:30pm.

On November 16, 2021, the Department of Defense Office of Inspector General released their findings on the actions that took place to prepare for and respond to protests at the U.S. Capitol. The report concluded that the actions the DoD took before January 6, 2021, to prepare for the planned protests in Washington, D.C., on January 5 and 6, 2021, were appropriate.

In early December 2021, Colonel Earl G. Matthews, a Trump appointee, released a rebuttal to the DoDIG report that accused LTG Piatt of making willful distortions of the events of January 6, describing Piatt and General Charles A. Flynn as "absolute and unmitigated liars" and of giving "perjured testimony before Congress."

=== Fallout ===
Piatt was once the leading candidate to take over as the commanding general of United States Army Futures Command, and appointment to the rank of general. He had received the recommendation from several top defense officials. However, he was rejected by President Biden due to his handling of National Guard deployment during the January 6 attacks on the Capitol.

== Awards and decorations ==
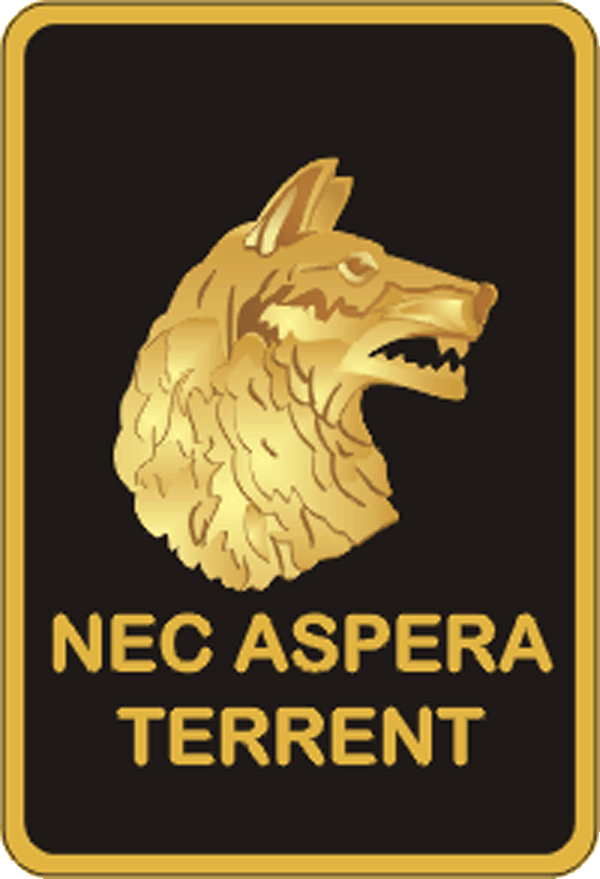
Combat Infantryman Badge
Ranger tab
Basic Parachutist Badge
Air Assault Badge
Army Staff Identification Badge
10th Mountain Division Shoulder sleeve insignia
Republic of Korea Basic Parachutist Badge
27th Infantry Regiment Distinctive Unit Insignia
8 Overseas Service Bars

Army Distinguished Service Medal with two bronze oak leaf clusters
Defense Superior Service Medal
Legion of Merit with four oak leaf clusters
Bronze Star with four oak leaf clusters
Defense Meritorious Service Medal
Meritorious Service Medal with one oak leaf cluster
Army Commendation Medal with oak leaf cluster
Army Achievement Medal with oak leaf cluster
Joint Meritorious Unit Award
Army Good Conduct Medal
National Defense Service Medal with one bronze service star
Armed Forces Expeditionary Medal
Afghanistan Campaign Medal with three campaign stars
Iraq Campaign Medal with four campaign stars
Inherent Resolve Campaign Medal with one campaign star
Global War on Terrorism Service Medal
Korea Defense Service Medal
Humanitarian Service Medal with one bronze service star
NCO Professional Development Ribbon
Army Service Ribbon
Army Overseas Service Ribbon with bronze award numeral 9
NATO Medal for the former Yugoslavia

Military offices
Preceded by Bryan L. Rudacille	Commanding General of the 7th Army Joint Multinational Training Command; 2013–2014	Succeeded by Christopher G. Cavoli
Preceded by Richard Longo	Deputy Commanding General and Chief of Staff of the United States Army Europe; 2014–2015	Succeeded by William Gayler
Preceded by Ryan F. Gonsalves	Director of Operations, Readiness, and Mobilization of the United States Army; 2015–2016	Succeeded by Brian E. Winski
Preceded by Jeffrey L. Bannister	Commanding General of the 10th Mountain Division; 2017–2019	Succeeded by Brian J. Mennes
Preceded by Joseph M. Martin	Director of the Army Staff; 2019–2024	Succeeded by Laura A. Potter
