= Terrence McKenrick =

U.S. Army general

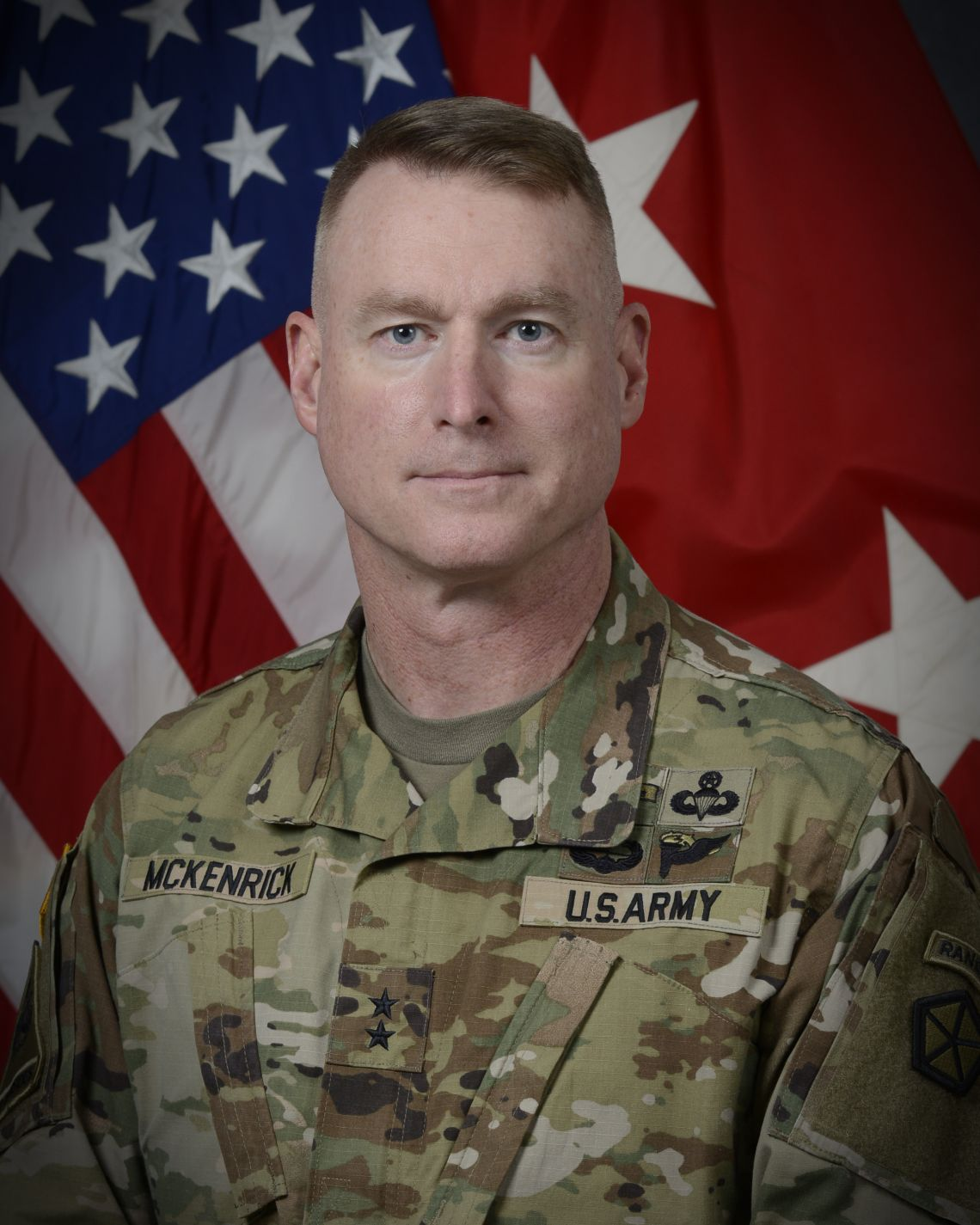
- Military career
- Allegiance: United States
- Branch: United States Army
- Service years: 1986–2021
- Rank: Major General
- Commands: First Army Division East; United States Army Joint Modernization Command; Brigade Modernization Command

Terrence J. McKenrick is the 22nd President of Georgia Military College, assuming the role following a 35-year career in the United States Army, retiring on September 1, 2021. His final assignments as a Major General included Deputy Commanding General of V Corps, Commanding General of Division East, Deputy Commanding General of U.S. Army Central, and Commanding General of U.S. Army Joint Modernization Command. He previously served in senior leadership positions with the 1st Armored Division, U.S. Central Command Forward in Jordan, the Joint Staff in the Pentagon, and the Office of Security Cooperation in Iraq. His commands also included the 192d Infantry Brigade, Warrior Transition Brigade at Walter Reed, and the 4th Ranger Training Battalion. He deployed in support of operations to Iraq, Jordan, and Haiti. His awards include the Army Distinguished Service Medal, the Defense Superior Service Medal, the Legion of Merit, the Bronze Star Medal, the Ranger Tab, and the Master Parachutist badge. He is a West Point graduate and earned Master degrees from Hawaii Pacific University and the National Defense University, along with completing numerous executive and military joint leadership courses.

Military offices
Preceded by ???	Deputy Director for Operations (Team One) of the Joint Staff; 2013–2014	Succeeded by Paul T. Calvert
Preceded by Scott McKean	Deputy Commanding General (Operations) of 1st Armored Division; 2014–2015	Succeeded by Francis M. Beaudette
Preceded by John W. Charlton	Commanding General of the Brigade Modernization Command, later United States Army Joint Modernization Command; 2015–2017	Succeeded by Joel K. Tyler
Preceded by William B. Hickman	Deputy Commanding General of the United States Army Central; 2017–2018	Succeeded by David C. Hill
Preceded by Todd B. McCaffrey	Commanding General of the First Army Division East; 2018–2020	Succeeded by Mark H. Landes
New office	Deputy Commanding General of the V Corps; 2020–2021	Succeeded by Matthew J. Van Wagenen
