= Joel Tyler =

U.S. Army general

Joel K. Tyler
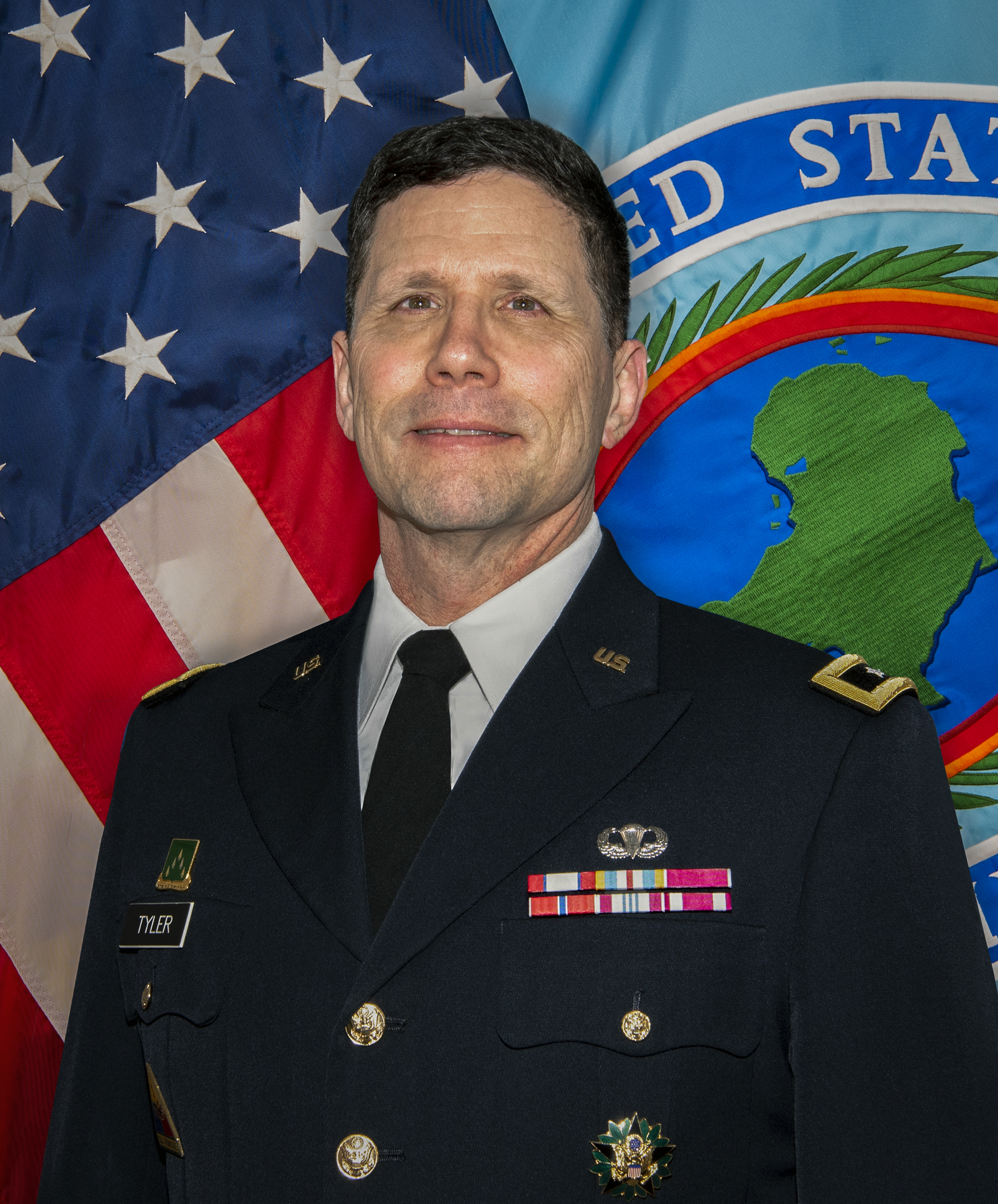
- Military career
- Allegiance: United States
- Branch: United States Army
- Service years: 1988–2023
- Rank: Major general
- Commands: United States Army Test and Evaluation Command; United States Army Joint Modernization Command
- Conflicts: Gulf War; Iraq War
- Awards: Army Distinguished Service Medal; Defense Superior Service Medal; Legion of Merit (2); Bronze Star Medal

Joel K. Tyler is a retired United States Army major general who last served as chief of staff of the United States Africa Command. He was previously the director of operations and cyber of the United States Africa Command, commanding general of the United States Army Test and Evaluation Command, and prior to that the commander of the United States Army Joint Modernization Command. In March 2021, he was assigned to replace Major General William Gayler as the Chief of Staff of the United States Africa Command.

Tyler attended the University of Arkansas, where he participated in the Army Reserve Officers' Training Corps program and earned a commission and a Bachelor of Arts degree in political science in 1988. He later received a Master of Science degree in public administration from Central Michigan University and a Master of Arts degree in national security and strategic studies from the College of Naval Warfare.

Military offices
Preceded by Terrence McKenrick	Commanding General of the United States Army Joint Modernization Command; 2017–2018	Succeeded by Johnny K. Davis
Preceded by John W. Charlton	Commanding General of the United States Army Test and Evaluation Command; 2018–2020	Succeeded by James J. Gallivan
Preceded by William Gayler	Director of Operations and Cyber of the United States Africa Command; 2020–2021	Succeeded by Gregory K. Anderson
Preceded by William Gayler	Chief of Staff of the United States Africa Command; 2021–2023	Succeeded by David J. Francis
