= General Tyler =

General Tyler may refer to:

- Daniel Tyler (1799–1882), iron manufacturer, railroad president, and one of the first Union Army generals of the American Civil War
- Erastus B. Tyler (1822–1891), American businessman, merchant, and a general in the Union Army during the American Civil War
- Joel Tyler (fl. 1980s–2020s), United States Army major general
- Robert C. Tyler (1832–1865), Confederate brigadier general during the American Civil War
- Robert O. Tyler (1831–1874), general in the Union Army during the American Civil War
- Timothy Tyler (active 1972–2008), Major-General and former Quartermaster-General to the Forces in the British Army
