= Leadership of the United States Africa Command =

U.S. Africa Command commander

Seal of the United States Africa Command

This is a list of all commanders, deputy commanders, senior enlisted leaders, and chiefs of staff of the United States Africa Command.

== Current headquarters staff ==
- Dagvin Anderson, Commander
  - John W. Brennan, Deputy Commander
    - Matthew Trollinger, Chief of Staff
      - Rose P. Keravuori, Director, Intelligence (J2)
      - Claude K. Tudor, Director, Operations/Cyber (J3)
        - Timothy E. Brennan, Deputy Director, Operations/Cyber (J3/6)
        - Fridrik Fridriksson, Deputy Director, Operations/Cyber (J3/6)
      - George E. Bresnihan, Director, Logistics (J4)
      - Kenneth Ekman, Director, Strategy, Engagement, and Programs (J5)
        - Jon E. Solem, Deputy Director, Plans and Strategic Integration (J5)
        - Peter Bailey, Deputy Director, Strategy, Engagement, and Programs (J5)
      - Jesse A. Philipps, Director, C4 Systems (J6) and Chief Information Officer

== List of leaders of the United States Africa Command ==
=== Commanders ===
Commander of the United States Africa Command
- Emblem of the United States Africa Command

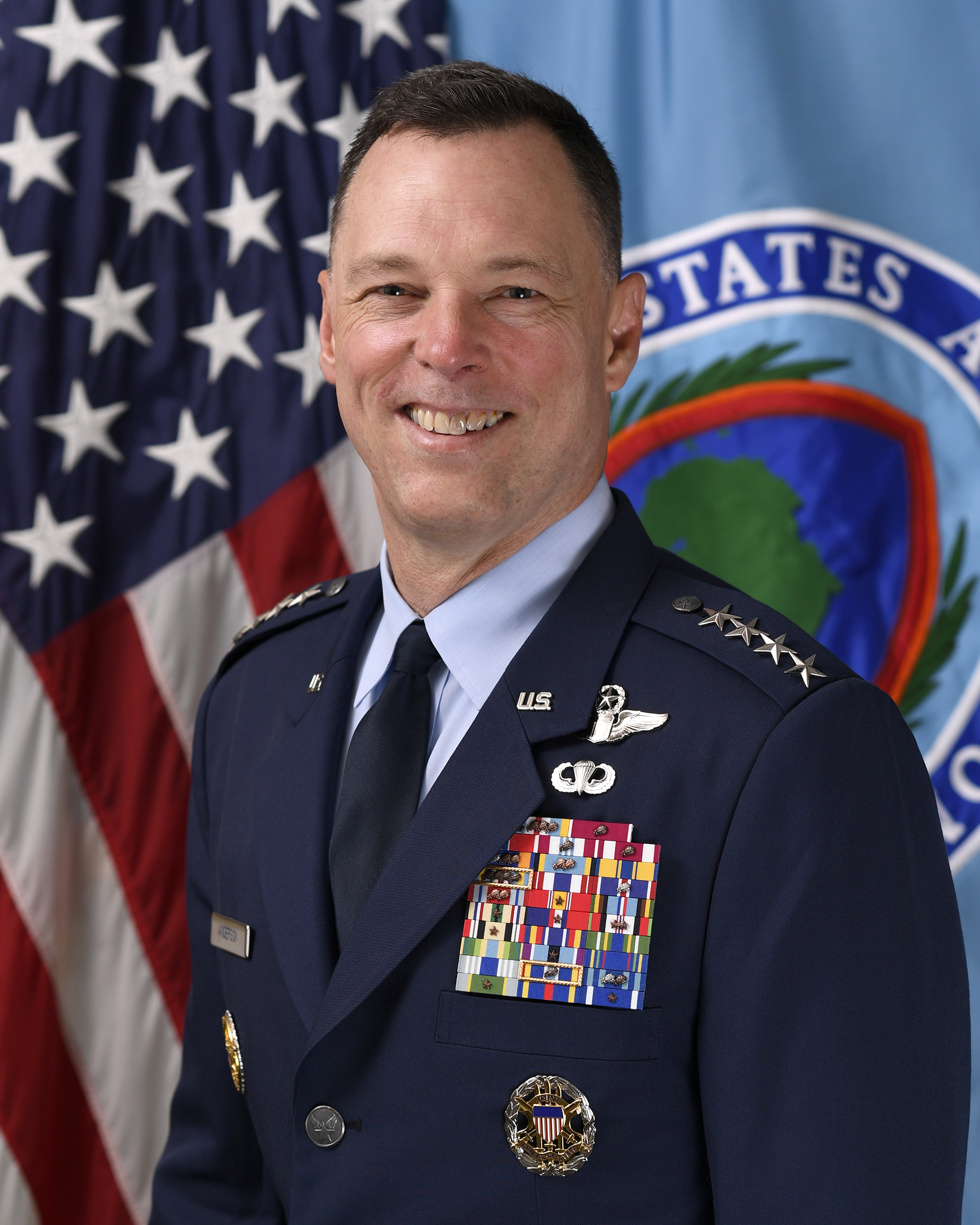
- Incumbent; General Dagvin Anderson, USAF since 15 August 2025
- Abbreviation: CDRUSAFRICOM
- Reports to: President of the United States; Secretary of Defense
- Appointer: The president with Senate advice and consent
- Term length: 3 years
- Constituting instrument: 10 U.S.C. § 164
- Formation: 1 October 2007
- First holder: William E. Ward
- Deputy: Deputy Commander, United States Africa Command

No.	Commander		Term			Service branch
No.	Portrait	Name	Took office	Left office	Term length	Service branch
1	William E. Ward	General; William E. Ward (born 1949)	1 October 2007	9 March 2011	3 years, 159 days	U.S. Army
2	Carter F. Ham	General; Carter F. Ham (born 1952)	9 March 2011	5 April 2013	2 years, 27 days	U.S. Army
3	David M. Rodriguez	General; David M. Rodriguez (born 1954)	5 April 2013	18 July 2016	3 years, 104 days	U.S. Army
4	Thomas D. Waldhauser	General; Thomas D. Waldhauser (born 1953)	18 July 2016	26 July 2019	3 years, 8 days	U.S. Marine Corps
5	Stephen J. Townsend	General; Stephen J. Townsend (born 1959)	26 July 2019	9 August 2022	3 years, 14 days	U.S. Army
6	Michael Langley	General; Michael Langley (born 1961/1962)	9 August 2022	15 August 2025	3 years, 6 days	U.S. Marine Corps
7	Dagvin Anderson	General; Dagvin Anderson (born 1970)	15 August 2025	Incumbent	1 year, 23 days	U.S. Air Force

=== Deputy commanders ===
No.	Deputy Commander		Term			Service branch
No.	Portrait	Name	Took office	Left office	Term length	Service branch
1	Robert T. Moeller	Vice Admiral; Robert T. Moeller (1951–2011)	10 October 2007	12 April 2010	2 years, 184 days	U.S. Navy
2	Charles J. Leidig	Vice Admiral; Charles J. Leidig (born 1955)	August 2010	June 2013	~2 years, 304 days	U.S. Navy
3	Steven A. Hummer	Lieutenant General; Steven A. Hummer (born 1952)	June 2013	~June 2015	~2 years, 21 days	U.S. Marine Corps
4	Michael T. Franken	Vice Admiral; Michael T. Franken (born 1957)	~22 June 2015	~2 August 2017	~2 years, 41 days	U.S. Navy
5	James C. Vechery	Lieutenant General; James C. Vechery (born 1966)	~2 August 2017	~4 August 2020	~3 years, 2 days	U.S. Air Force
6	Kirk W. Smith	Lieutenant General; Kirk W. Smith	~4 August 2020	3 April 2024	~3 years, 243 days	U.S. Air Force
7	John W. Brennan	Lieutenant General; John W. Brennan	3 April 2024	Incumbent	2 years, 157 days	U.S. Army

=== Senior enlisted leaders ===
No.	Senior enlisted leader		Term			Service branch
No.	Portrait	Name	Took office	Left office	Term length	Service branch
1	Mark S. Ripka	Command Sergeant Major; Mark S. Ripka	1 November 2007	11 March 2011	3 years, 130 days	U.S. Army
2	Jack Johnson Jr.	Chief Master Sergeant; Jack Johnson Jr.	11 March 2011	July 2013	~2 years, 112 days	U.S. Air Force
3	Darrin J. Bohn	Command Sergeant Major; Darrin J. Bohn	July 2013	27 September 2016	~3 years, 88 days	U.S. Army
4	Ramón Colón-López	Chief Master Sergeant; Ramón Colón-López (born 1971)	27 September 2016	November 2019	~3 years, 35 days	U.S. Air Force
-	Ryan P. Burton	Command Master Chief; Ryan P. Burton; Acting	November 2019	28 February 2020	~119 days	U.S. Navy
5	Richard D. Thresher	Sergeant Major; Richard D. Thresher	28 February 2020	1 May 2023	3 years, 62 days	U.S. Marine Corps
6	Michael P. Woods	Sergeant Major; Michael P. Woods	1 May 2023	20 November 2025	2 years, 203 days	U.S. Marine Corps
7	Garric M. Banfield	Command Sergeant Major; Garric M. Banfield	20 November 2025	Incumbent	291 days	U.S. Army

=== Chiefs of staff ===
No.	Chief of Staff		Term			Service branch
No.	Portrait	Name	Took office	Left office	Term length	Service branch
1	Michael A. Snodgrass	Major General; Michael A. Snodgrass	1 October 2007	7 October 2010	3 years, 6 days	U.S. Air Force
2	Richard J. Sherlock Jr.	Major General; Richard J. Sherlock Jr.	7 October 2010	1 June 2011	237 days	U.S. Army
3	H. D. Polumbo Jr.	Major General; H. D. Polumbo Jr.	1 June 2011	23 March 2012	296 days	U.S. Air Force
4	O.G. Mannon	Major General; O.G. Mannon	23 March 2012	February 2014	~1 year, 315 days	U.S. Air Force
5	Michael J. Kingsley	Major General; Michael J. Kingsley	February 2014	June 2016	~2 years, 121 days	U.S. Air Force
6	Roger L. Cloutier	Major General; Roger L. Cloutier	June 2016	July 2018	~2 years, 30 days	U.S. Army
7	Todd B. McCaffrey	Major General; Todd B. McCaffrey	July 2018	June 2020	~1 year, 336 days	U.S. Army
8	William K. Gayler	Major General; William K. Gayler	July 2020	~21 June 2021	~355 days	U.S. Army
9	Joel K. Tyler	Major General; Joel K. Tyler	21 June 2021	9 June 2023	1 year, 353 days	U.S. Army
10	David J. Francis	Major General; David J. Francis	9 June 2023	1 July 2024	1 year, 22 days	U.S. Army
11	Matthew Trollinger	Major General; Matthew Trollinger	1 July 2024	Incumbent	2 years, 68 days	U.S. Marine Corps

== See also ==
- United States Africa Command
- Leadership of the United States European Command
- Leadership of the United States Indo-Pacific Command
- Leadership of the United States Northern Command
- Leadership of the United States Space Command
- Leadership of the United States Cyber Command
- Leadership of the United States Strategic Command
- Leadership of the United States Transportation Command
