= Gregory K. Anderson =

U.S. Army general

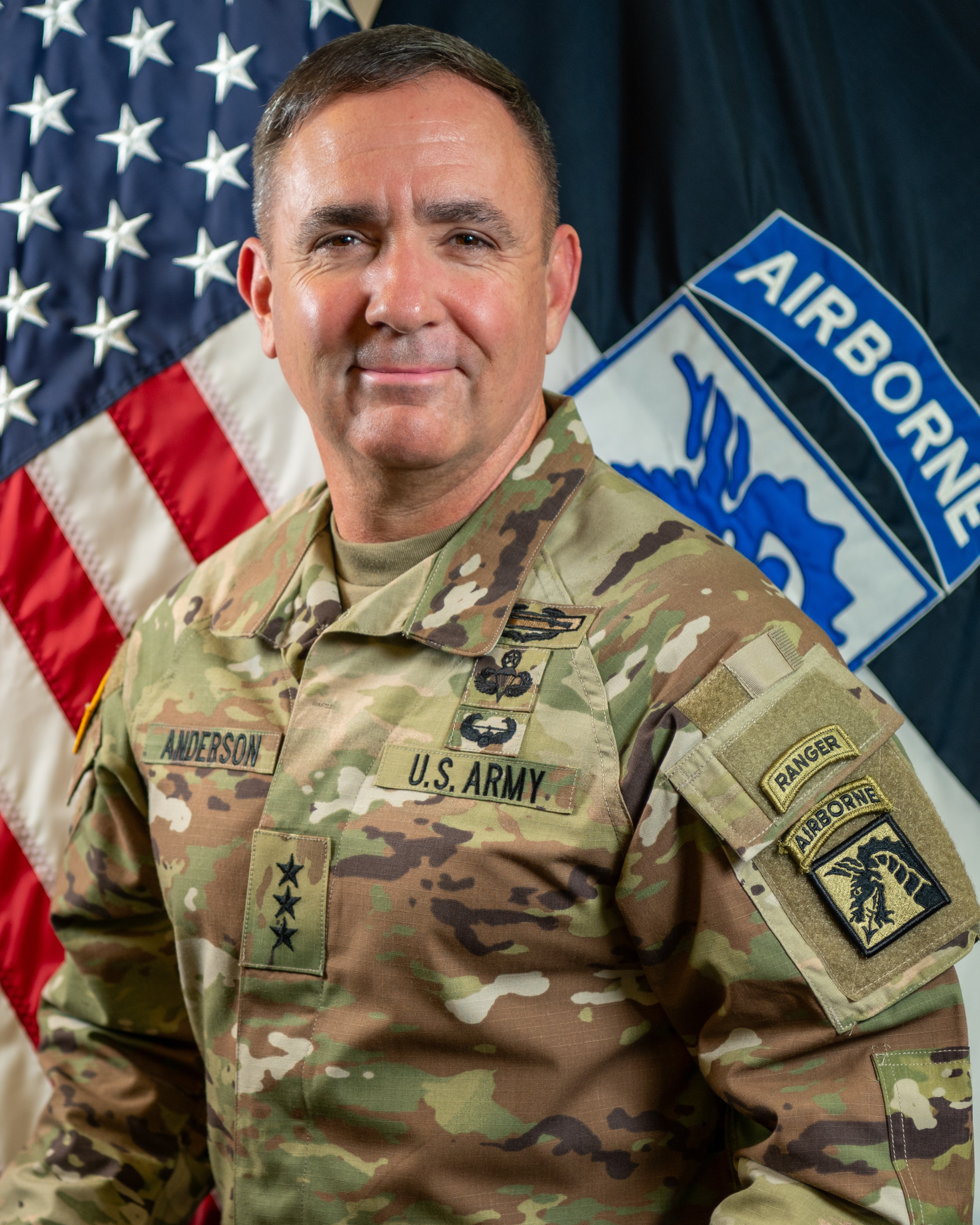
- Official portrait, 2024
- Born: San Jose, California, U.S.
- Military career
- Allegiance: United States
- Branch: United States Army
- Service years: 1991–present
- Rank: Lieutenant General
- Commands: XVIII Airborne Corps; 10th Mountain Division; 173rd Airborne Brigade
- Conflicts: War in Afghanistan; Iraq War
- Awards: Defense Superior Service Medal; Legion of Merit; Bronze Star Medal

Gregory K. Anderson is a United States Army lieutenant general who has served as the commanding general of XVIII Airborne Corps since 6 December 2024. He most recently served as commanding general of the 10th Mountain Division from 2022 to 2024. He previously served as the director of operations and cyber of the United States Africa Command from 2021 to 2022.

== Military career ==
Anderson served as the deputy director of strategy, plans, and policy of the United States Central Command from June 2019 to June 2021.

In May 2024, Anderson was nominated for promotion to lieutenant general and assignment as commanding general of the XVIII Airborne Corps.

== Awards and decorations ==
Anderson's decorations include

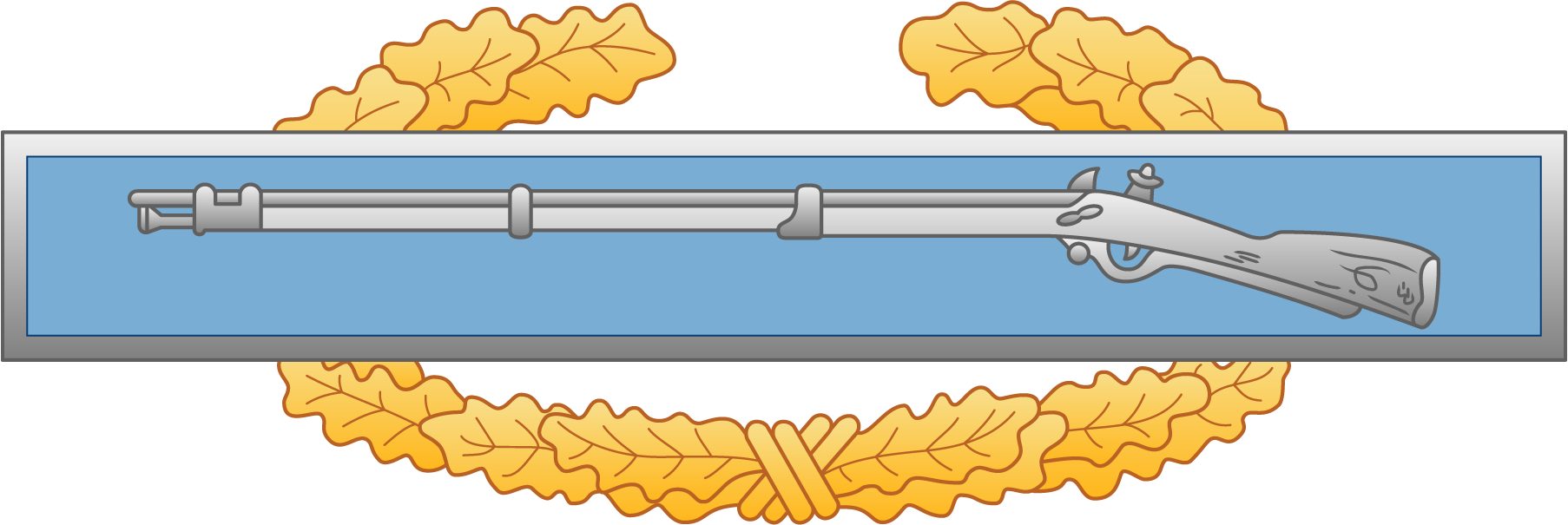

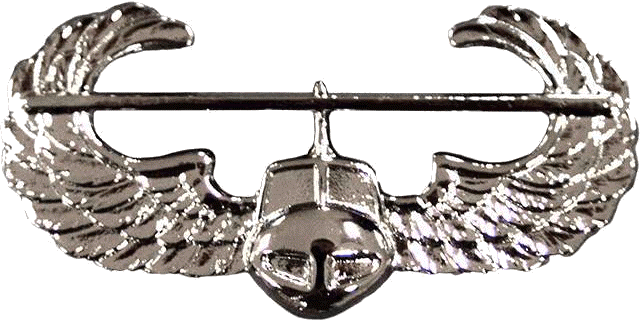

MasterCombat Infantryman Badge
Army Distinguished Service Medal with bronze oak leaf cluster
Defense Superior Service Medal with bronze oak leaf cluster	Legion of Merit with two bronze oak leaf clusters	Bronze Star Medal with two bronze oak leaf clusters
Defense Meritorious Service Medal	Meritorious Service Medal with two with three bronze oak leaf clusters	Army Commendation Medal with two bronze oak leaf clusters
Army Achievement Medal with one bronze oak leaf cluster	National Defense Service Medal with bronze service star	Armed Forces Expeditionary Medal
Afghanistan Campaign Medal with four bronze service stars	Iraq Campaign Medal with four bronze service stars	Global War on Terrorism Expeditionary Medal
Global War on Terrorism Service Medal	Armed Forces Service Medal	Humanitarian Service Medal
Army Service Ribbon	Army Overseas Service RibbonAward numeral 3	NATO Medal with Non-Article 5 with three bronze service stars
Joint Meritorious Unit Award with bronze oak leaf cluster	Meritorious Unit Commendation with four bronze oak leaf clusters	Army Superior Unit Award
Army Master Parachutist Badge		Air Assault Badge

Other accoutrements
10th Mountain Division's Headquarters Battalion Distinctive unit insignia
10th Mountain Division
XVIII Airborne Corps
German Bronze Parachutist Badge
Ranger Tab
9 Overseas Service Bars

Military offices
Preceded by Milford H. Beagle Jr.	Deputy Commanding General (Support) of the 10th Mountain Division; 2018–2019	Succeeded by Michelle A. Schmidt
Preceded by Charles R. Miller	Deputy Director of Strategy, Plans, and Policy of the United States Central Command; 2019–2021	Succeeded by Colin P. Tuley
Preceded by Joel Tyler	Director of Operations and Cyber of the United States Africa Command; 2021–2022	Succeeded by David J. Francis
Preceded by Milford H. Beagle Jr.	Commanding General of the 10th Mountain Division; 2022–2024	Succeeded by Scott M. Naumann
Preceded by Christopher T. Donahue	Commanding General of XVIII Airborne Corps; 2024–present	Incumbent
