= Matthew Trollinger =

U.S. Marine Corps general

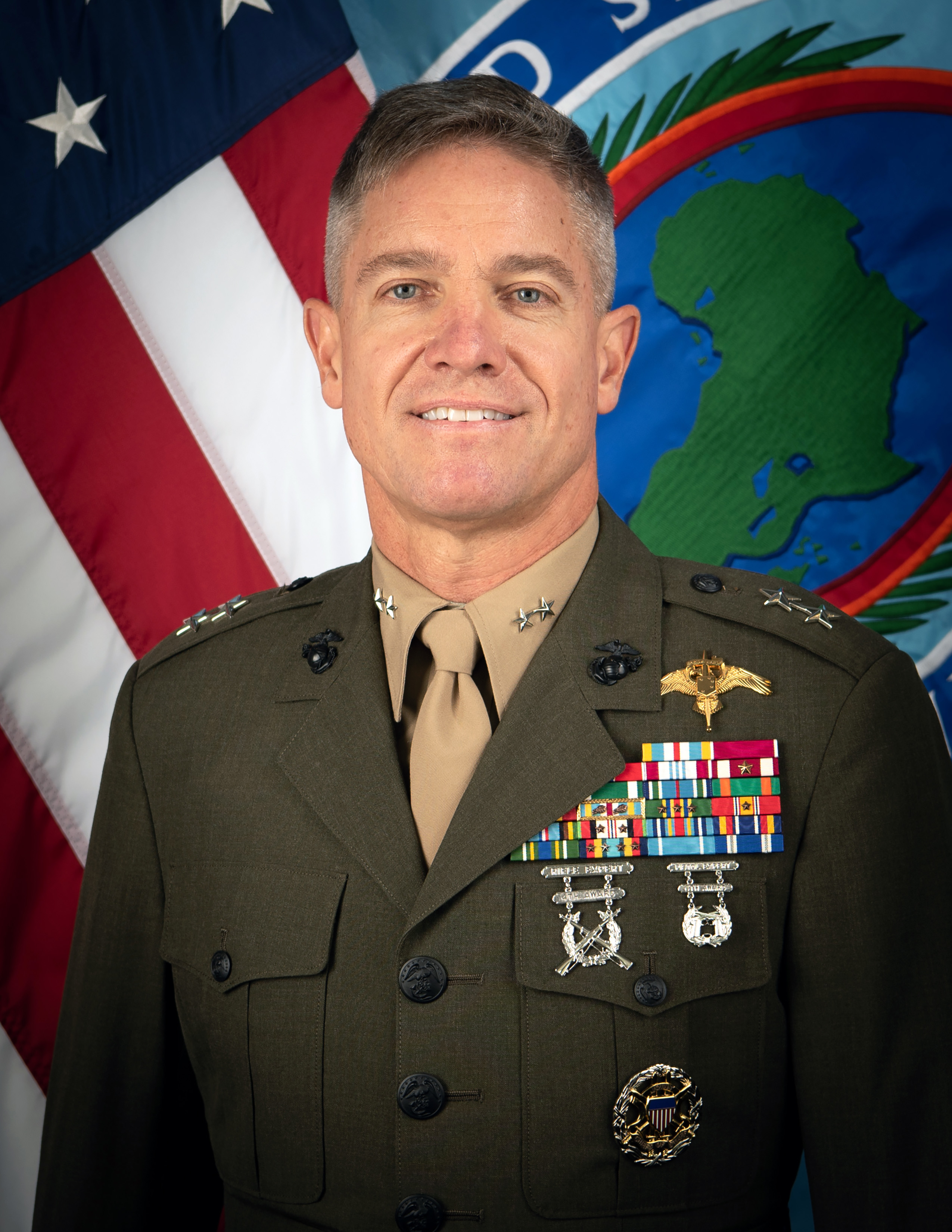
- Official portrait, 2024
- Military career
- Allegiance: United States
- Branch: United States Marine Corps
- Service years: 1990–present
- Rank: Major General
- Commands: United States Marine Forces Special Operations Command; 5th Marine Expeditionary Brigade; 11th Marine Expeditionary Unit; 3rd Marine Special Operations Battalion
- Conflicts: War in Afghanistan
- Awards: Legion of Merit; Bronze Star Medal (2)

Matthew G. Trollinger is a United States Marine Corps major general who has served as the chief of staff of United States Africa Command since July 1, 2024. He served as the commander of United States Marine Forces Special Operations Command from May 2022 to June 2024. He served as the Deputy Director for Politico-Military Affairs (Middle East) of the Joint Staff. He was previously the Commanding General of the 5th Marine Expeditionary Brigade from July 2018 to July 6, 2020.

== Military career ==
Trollinger graduated from the Old Dominion University and received his commission into the Marine Corps in 1990 as an infantry officer. Trollinger has a diverse background in reconnaissance, security forces, and special operations, deploying numerous times in support of both routine and emergent requirements. Trollinger has held commands to include the Naval Amphibious Force, Task Force 51/5th Marine Expeditionary Brigade, 11th Marine Expeditionary Unit, 3rd Marine Special Operations Battalion, and 1st Fleet Antiterrorism Security Team Company. Trollinger also served as the Operations Officer for a Marine Expeditionary Unit as well as a Battalion Landing Team. In 1998, Trollinger graduated from the Amphibious Warfare School, and in 2011 he was the Commandant of the Marine Corps Fellow with the Center for Strategic and International Studies.

In June 2012, Trollinger was assigned as the Military Assistant to the Deputy Undersecretary of the Navy for Plans, Policy, Oversight and Integration. In April 2016, he completed the AMP at Harvard Business School. He took command of the United States Marine Forces Special Operations Command from Major General James F. Glynn on May 23, 2022.

== Personal life ==
Trollinger is married, and he and his wife, Nancy, have two children.

== Awards and decorations ==
Trollingers' decorations and medals include:

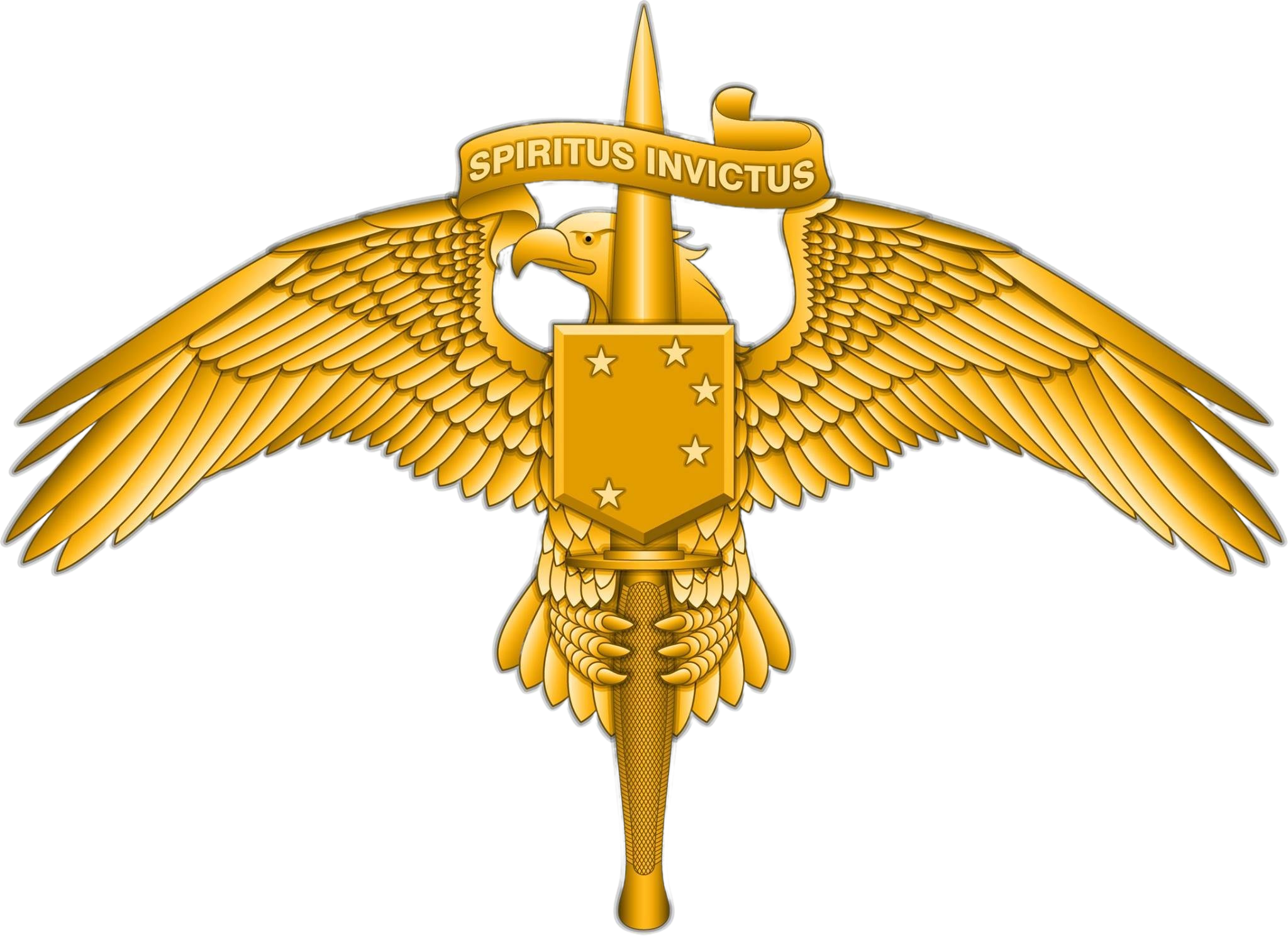

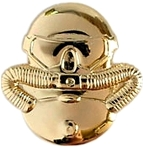

Marine Special Operator Insignia
Defense Superior Service Medal	Bronze Star Medal with award star	Legion of Merit	Defense Meritorious Service Medal
Meritorious Service Medal with award star	Navy Commendation Medal	Joint Service Achievement Medal	Navy Achievement Medal with award stars
Combat Action Ribbon	Joint Meritorious Unit Award with two bronze oak leaf clusters	Navy Meritorious Unit Commendation with three bronze service stars	National Defense Service Medal with one bronze service star
Armed Forces Expeditionary Medal	Afghanistan Campaign Medal with two bronze service stars	Global War on Terrorism Expeditionary Medal	Global War on Terrorism Service Medal
Korea Defense Service Medal	Sea Service Deployment Ribbon with eight service stars	United Nations Medal	NATO Medal for service with Non-Article 5
Rifle Expert Badge		Pistol Expert Badge	
Marine Corps Combatant Diver Insignia		Navy and Marine Corps Parachutist Badge	
Joint Chiefs of Staff Identification Badge

Military offices
Preceded by Francis L. Donovan	Commanding General of the 5th Marine Expeditionary Brigade; 2018–2020	Succeeded by Farrell J. Sullivan
Preceded by Scott Benedict	Deputy Director for Political-Military Affairs (Middle East) of the Joint Staff; 2020–2022	Succeeded by Adan G. Cruz
Preceded by James F. Glynn	Commander of the United States Marine Forces Special Operations Command; 2022–2024	Succeeded by Peter D. Huntley
Preceded by David J. Francis	Chief of Staff of the United States Africa Command; 2024–present	Incumbent
