= Mark Hertling =

United States Army general (born 1953)

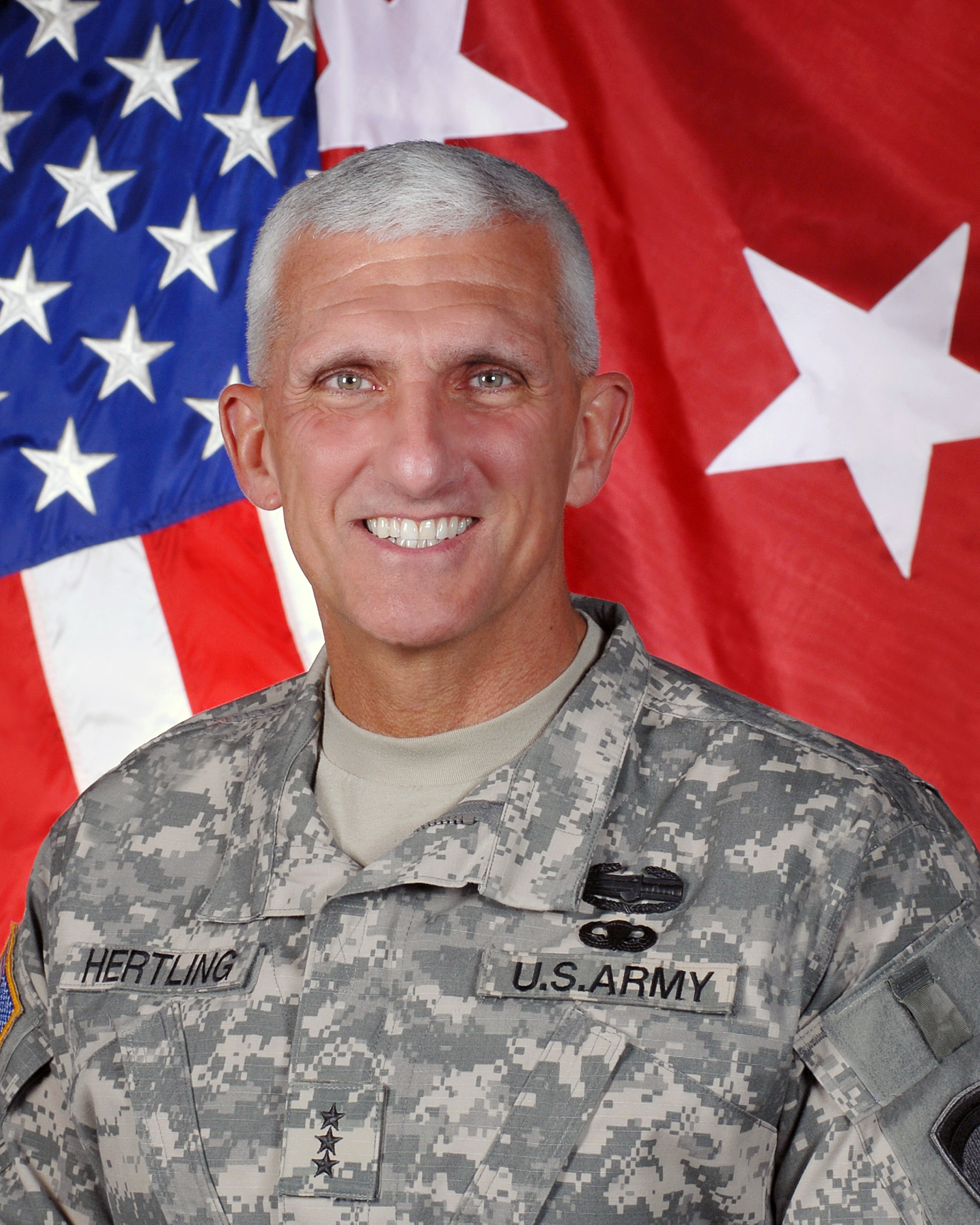
- Hertling in 2011
- Born: September 29, 1953 (age 73); St. Louis, Missouri, U.S.
- Military career
- Allegiance: United States
- Branch: United States Army
- Service years: 1975–2013
- Rank: Lieutenant General
- Commands: United States Army Europe; United States Army Center for Initial Military Training; 1st Armored Division; Multi-National Division North; National Training Center
- Conflicts: Gulf War; Iraq War; Libyan Civil War
- Awards: Army Distinguished Service Medal (2); Defense Superior Service Medal; Legion of Merit (4); Bronze Star Medal (4); Purple Heart

Mark Phillip Hertling (born September 29, 1953) is a retired United States Army Lieutenant General. From March 2011 to November 2012, he served as the Commanding General of United States Army Europe and the Seventh Army. Hertling served in armor, cavalry, planning, operations and training positions, and commanded every organization from platoon to field army. He commanded the 1st Armored Division and Task Force Iron/Multinational Division-North in Iraq during the troop surge of 2007 to 2008.

After retirement from the army, Hertling became a senior vice president for the Florida Hospital organization in Orlando from 2012 to 2018. While there, he developed a successful Physician Leader Development course for that organization. In 2016, he also published the book Growing Physician Leaders. Since 2018, he has provided leadership courses to several healthcare institutions throughout the nation, while also speaking on leadership and national security for myriad audiences.

In 2013, Hertling was also appointed by President Barack Obama to be one of 25 people serving on the President's Council on Fitness, Sports, and Nutrition. He served as a council member until 20 January 2017. He also acts as a senior advisor to "Mission Readiness", a nonprofit, bipartisan organization of retired military leaders who call for smart investments for U.S. children. He has served as a board member for World TEAM (The Exceptional Athlete Matters) Sport, an organization providing opportunities for physically challenged athletes, and he serves as a senior advisor to "Operation Gratitude", an organization supporting deployed military, first line responders, healthcare workers and their families. In 2016, he was named as an adjunct scholar to the Modern War Institute at the United States Military Academy at West Point, and in 2019 he became an adjunct professor at the Crummer School of Business at Rollins College, and was later appointed as professor of practice, leadership for the Crummer Graduate School of Business in 2024. In 2021, Hertling received a presidential appointment to the American Battle Monuments Commission. Since June 2014, Hertling has appeared as a national security and military analyst for CNN. In November 2025 Hertling joined The Bulwark as a commentator and expert on politico-military affairs.

== Early life and education ==
Hertling was born in St. Louis, Missouri. He attended Christian Brothers College High School, then located in Clayton, Missouri, graduating in 1971. He is a member of the CBC Alumni Hall of Fame, elected in 2010. In 1975, Hertling was commissioned as a second lieutenant in the Armor Branch after graduation from the United States Military Academy at West Point. While at West Point, Hertling was on the NCAA Division I Swimming and Water Polo Team, and he was active as a member of his class committee and attained the rank of Cadet Captain.

Hertling received a Master of Science in kinesiology from Indiana University School of Public Health-Bloomington in 1984, a Master of Military Arts and Sciences from the Command and General Staff College at Fort Leavenworth, Kansas, and a Master of National Security and Strategic Studies from the National War College in Washington, D.C. In May 2019 he received a doctorate in business administration from the Crummer School of Business, Rollins College, defending research regarding physician leadership in the healthcare industry.

== Military career ==
Throughout his military career, Hertling saw alternating assignment between operational and training postings, and he gained a reputation as a skilled trainer and a soldier-focused leader and commander. He has been assigned to all of the Combat Training Centers in the United States and Germany, expanding the center in Europe. Hertling has influenced the training model in the U.S. Army at various stages of his career. He served in command and staff assignments in the continental United States and overseas.

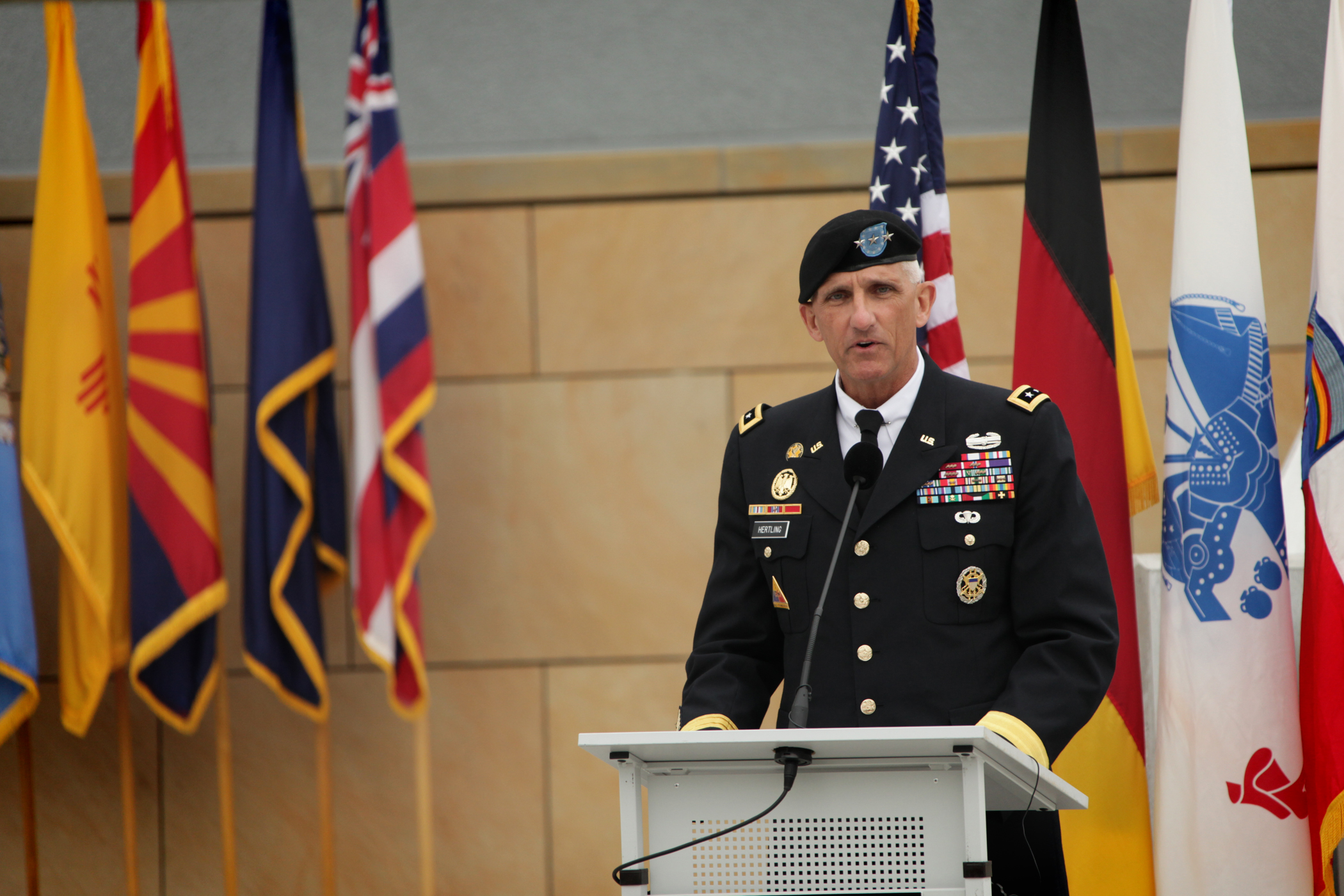
Lt. Gen. Mark Hertling, commander of U.S. Army Europe, speaks in a ceremony at the new Gen. John Shalikashvili Mission Command Center in Wiesbaden, Germany, June 14, 2012.

Hertling began his professional career in Europe as a second lieutenant, leading tank and scout platoons in the 3rd Infantry Division in 1975 to 1977. In 1988, he returned to Europe as a major, serving first on the staff of the 1st Armored Division as the deputy G-3, then as the S-3 of 1st Squadron, 1st Cavalry Regiment (Blackhawks) with whom he deployed during Operation Desert Shield/Desert Storm. The 1-1 Cavalry was cited for its role in the Battle of Medina Ridge, where Hertling was wounded in action.

Hertling also commanded 1st Squadron, 16th Cavalry Regiment at Fort Knox. He also commanded 3rd Brigade, 2nd Infantry Division at Fort Lewis, Wash. when that unit was named as the Army's first Stryker Brigade. He was Commander of Operations Group, National Training Center and Fort Irwin, Fort Irwin, California, and commanded the 7th Army Training Command, transforming it to the Joint-Multinational Training Command, in Grafenwoehr, Germany. He also served as the Vice J-7 and the J-7, on the Joint Staff in Washington, D.C. from 2001 to 2003, and as the United States Army Europe G-3 from 2005 to 2007.

Hertling's overseas assignments include responsibility as the Commanding General, 1st Armored Division/Multi-National Division-North, as a major general from October 2007 to December 2008, both in Wiesbaden, Germany and in Iraq during Operation Iraqi Freedom. Prior to this, as a brigadier general, he was the assistant division commander from September 2003 to August 2004 of the 1st Armored Division, United States Army Europe and Seventh United States Army, in Baghdad, Iraq.

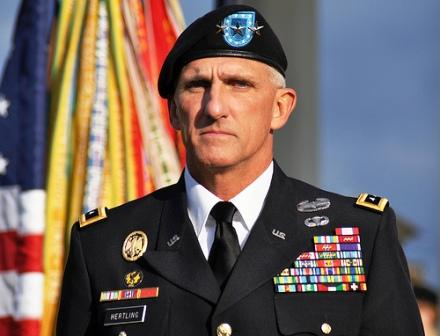
Hertling became the first Deputy Commanding General for Initial Military Training.

Before his final posting as the USAREUR Commander, Hertling commanded the 1st Armored Division from 2007 to 2009, and he was the first Deputy Commanding General for Initial Military Training (IMT) from 2009 to 2011. In the former role, he commanded the "1st Tank" in both its home location in Germany, and for 15 months as part of the surge in Iraq. In Iraq, Task Force Iron was based in Tikrit, and cooperated with five Iraqi Army divisions in security and on a "whole of government" approach. As a combined force, these units conducted many operations to strengthen the Iraqi Security Forces and the provincial governments in the four Arab and three Kurdish provinces in the north, and they contributed to significant improvement in the economic and security conditions in the region. Hertling integrated a series of named kinetic operations ("Iron") with a unique series of non-kinetic engagements ("United and Strong") to further improve stability, government, economics, and security.

As the first commander of IMT from 2009 to 2011, Hertling was responsible for integrating the initial training of about 160,000 officers and enlisted soldiers entering United States Army training every year at 27 installations across the United States. Hertling led change in several areas, including integrating new training methods into basic combat training, advanced individual training, and basic officer leadership courses. IMT revised the Army's Warrior Tasks and Battle Drills and developed further training in rifle marksmanship, combatives, values instruction, first aid, and cultural training. IMT's "Soldier-Athlete" initiative also brought about innovative changes in physical readiness training, introducing athletic trainers and physical therapists to training units, and integrating performance nutrition into Army dining facilities ("Fueling the Soldier"). Complementing Soldier Athlete, Hertling recommended change to the Army's Physical Readiness (PT) test, a recommendation which was not initially accepted by the Army.

Hertling also taught in the Department of Physical Education at the United States Military Academy, and served as a speechwriter for General Frederick M. Franks Jr. when he commanded TRADOC.

== Response to Russian election interference ==
In 2018, Hertling and Molly K. McKew wrote an article for Politico: "Putin's Attack on the U.S. Is Our Pearl Harbor", which urged the United States to respond accordingly to Russian interference in the 2016 United States elections.

== Personal ==
In the 2024 United States presidential election, Hertling endorsed Kamala Harris.

Hertling met his wife Sue during his senior year of college. Their two sons, Todd and Scott, have also served as officers in the Army. Colonel Todd Hertling is an active-duty armor officer in command of the 1st Armored Brigade Combat Team, 1st Cavalry Division.

== Publications ==
1. CPT Mark Hertling and Dr James Peterson, "Being All You Can Be...Physically!", ARMY Magazine, February 1986, pp 45–49
2. Mark Hertling, "Brooms and Brawn", TRIATHLON Magazine, May 1986, pp 22–23
3. Mark Hertling, "Dryland Training at West Point", SWIMMING TECHNIQUE, May–June 1986, pp 23–30
4. James Sfayer and Mark Hertling, "Fit to Fight", Marine Corps Gazette, August 1987, pp 43–44
5. Mark P. Hertling, "Physical Training for the Modern Battlefield: Are We Tough Enough?". SAMS Monograph, CALL Library, Nov 23, 87
6. Mark P. Hertling, "Whence Values Come", Military Review, December 1987, 16–23
7. Mark P. Hertling, "Insights Garnered and Gained: The Israeli Defense Forces and Operation Peace for Galilee", SAMS Monograph, CALL Library, April 22, 88
8. Mark P. Hertling, "Narcoterrorism: The New Unconventional War", Military Review, March 90
9. Mark P. Hertling, "The Battle Of Oom Chalouba, June 17, 2008", ARMOR Magazine, Vol 104, Jan–Feb 1995 pg 26–33
10. Hertling, Mark P. "The Battle of Oom Chalouba, June 17, 2008: The Leader’s Role in Preparing Units for the Physical Demands of Combat." In Leadership: The Warrior’s Art, ed. Christopher D. Kolenda, 287–307. 2nd ed. Carlisle: Army War College Foundation Press, 2001. (UB210 .L21 2001)
11. COL Mark P. Hertling and Lt Col James Boiselle, "Coming of Age in the Desert: The NTC at 20", Military Review, September–October 2001, 64–65, October 9, 2002.
12. Thom Shanker and Mark Hertling, "The Military Media Relationship: A Dysfunctional Marriage", Military Review, Sept–Oct 2009, Vol 89, Number 5
13. LTG Mark P. Hertling, "The Year of the NCO: A Division Commander’s Perspective", Military Review, September 2009, Vol. 89, Number 5.
14. LTG Mark Hertling, LTC William Graham and MAJ Louis Florence, "We Need More Engineers!", ARMY Magazine, January 2010
15. LTG Mark Hertling, "What's Going On In Basic Training", ARMY Magazine, March 2010
16. LTG Mark Hertling and PFC Jennifer Prowell, "A Soldiers Thoughts on Training, Leadership", ARMY Magazine, November 2010
17. LTG Mark Hertling, "The US Army in Europe: Fighting Above Our Weight Class", AUSA Green Book 2011
18. LTG Mark Hertling, "Security and conflict in the Caucasus region, not frozen", Foreign Policy, The Best Defense Blog, August 2012
19. LTG (ret) Mark Hertling, "The Real Reason Iraq is Crumbling", The Washington Post, June 12, 2014
20. LTG (ret) Mark Hertling, "The Only Way to Defeat ISIS", CNN.com
21. LTG (ret) Mark Hertling, "Why Fighting ISIS Will Take Time, Patience", CNN.com
22. LTG (ret) Mark Hertlling, "A Case For Doing More in Ukraine", Military Times (reprinted in Kyiv Post),
23. LTG (ret) Mark Hertling, "What Videos Show About the Paris Terrorists", CNN.com
24. Mark Hertling, "A soldier's view on Trump" (March 4, 2016), CNN, State of Georgia: Cable News Network
25. Mark Hertling, "Growing Physician Leaders," published by Rosetta Books and Florida Hospital Publishers, May 2016. ISBN 978-0-7953-4808-2.

== Interviews ==
1. Military Family Reflects on Sacrifices of Iraq Service – Steve Inskeep. National Public Radio. September 13, 2004
2. Army Ranks See Imbalance in Iraq War Sacrifice – Steve Inskeep. National Public Radio. July 12, 2007
3. DoD News Briefing, Operation Iron Hammer. – November 19, 2007.
4. DoD News Briefing, Maj. Gen. Bergner and Maj. Gen. Hertling. – December 19, 2007.
5. U.S. Planes Strike Al-Qaida Hideouts Near Baghdad – Anne Garrells. National Public Radio. January 10, 2008
6. DoD News Briefing, Operational Update: Maj. Gen. Hertling – May 21, 2008.
7. U.S. Bridging Gaps Between Baghdad, Provinces – Renee Montagne, All Things Considered. National Public Radio. March 18, 2008
8. DoD News Briefing, Operational Update: Maj. Gen. Hertling – May 21, 2008.
9. US troops in Northern Iraq – Wolf Blitzer, CNN. May 23, 2008.
10. DoD News Briefing, Northern Iraq Security Operations – July 27, 2008.
11. US troops in Iraq – Wolf Blitzer, CNN. August 3, 2008.
12. DoD News Briefing, December 8, 2008.
13. New Basic Training Hardens Softer Generation – All Things Considered, National Public Radio. March 20, 2010
14. Making Soldiers Fit to Fight – James Dao, New York Times. August 30, 2010.
15. Soldiers Require Best Nutritional Benefits – Brian Williams, NBC Nightly News. December 13, 2010.
16. Army Boot Camp Embraces New-Age Fitness – Frank Morris, All Things Considered. National Public Radio. December 28, 2010.
17. Michelle Obama sees Military as Model for Fitness Effort, – Mimi Hall, USA Today. January 28, 2011.
18. US Army Europe and the Future of Forward Presence, – Atlantic Council. July 11, 2011.
19. US Army Europe Podcast: LTG Mark Hertling, – US Army Europe YouTube. Aug. 23, 2011.
20. Conference of European Armies highlights success of longtime alliances, new partnerships, – Jorge Benitez – Atlantic Council. Sept. 22, 2011.
21. Consensus scarce on future of overseas bases – Catherine Cheney and Charles Hoskinson – Politico. Oct. 23, 2011.
22. Future of US Army Europe, – Vago Muradian — Defensenews.com Oct. 30, 2011.
23. Rebalancing America's forces, The Downgrading of Europe, – The Economist. Jan. 14, 2012.
24. U.S. Army in Europe eyes greater partner training, – Alexandra Hudson — Reuters.com Feb. 4, 2012.
25. Boots on the ground: vital during peacetime too, – Dennis Steel — Army Magazine September 2012
26. Military Options in Iraq: Interview with Anderson Cooper, CNN (AC360)
27. Talking Iraq, Carole Costello and CNN Panel, YouTube,
28. The Marines Will Be Sitting Ducks: interview by Charlie Sykes, To The Contrary, March 31, 2026

== Speeches ==
1. VII Corps Desert Storm 20th Reunion – February 26, 2011
2. Impacts of Doctrinal and Technological Changes, Organization for Security Co-operation in Europe Seminar 2011 – May 25, 2011
3. Interagency and International Collaboration at Royal United Services Institute (RUSI) Land Warfare Conference 2011 – October 9, 2011
4. The Way Ahead, Conference of European Armies 2011 – September 21, 2011
5. The Strategic Value of United States Army Europe — AUSA 2011 Chapter Presidents Dinner – October 9, 2011
6. Marshall Center Program in Advanced Security Studies Seminar – November 29, 2011
7. V Corps Change of Command – January 10, 2012
8. USAREUR/IMCOM Combined Logistics Awards Ceremony – March 8, 2012
9. Wilton Park Conference 2012 – October 2, 2012
10. Tiger Security Conference, (Anniversary of Euromaidan), Kyiv, Ukraine, 18 November 2014

== Military schools ==
General Hertling has attended the following military schools :

- United States Military Academy – BS
- Armor Officer Basic Course
- Armor Officer Advanced Course
- Air Defense Artillery Officer Advance Course
- United States Army Command and General Staff College – MMAS – Military Arts and Sciences
- School of Advanced Military Studies
- National War College
- National Defense University – MS – National Security and Strategic Studies

== Civilian degrees ==
- Indiana University School of Public Health-Bloomington – MS – Physical Education
- Crummer School of Business, Rollins College – Doctor of Business Administration

== Dates of rank ==
- Second Lieutenant – June 4, 1975
- First Lieutenant – June 5, 1977
- Captain – November 18, 1979
- Major – June 1, 1986
- Lieutenant Colonel – July 1, 1992
- Colonel – August 1, 1997
- Brigadier General – January 1, 2003
- Major General – January 1, 2006
- Lieutenant General – September 25, 2009

== Decorations and badges ==
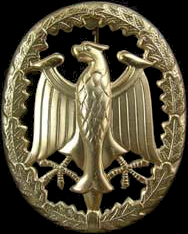
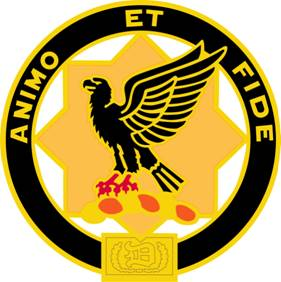
Army Distinguished Service Medal (with two bronze oak leaf cluster)
Defense Superior Service Medal
Legion of Merit (with 3 Oak Leaf Clusters)
Bronze Star (with 3 Oak Leaf Clusters)
Purple Heart
Meritorious Service Medal (with 4 Oak Leaf Clusters)
Army Commendation Medal (with 3 Oak Leaf Cluster and V Device)
Joint Service Achievement Medal
Army Achievement Medal (with 3 Oak Leaf Clusters)
Joint Meritorious Unit Award
Valorous Unit Award (with oak leaf cluster)
Meritorious Unit Commendation
National Defense Service Medal (with 2 service stars)
Southwest Asia Service Medal (with 3 service stars)
Iraq Campaign Medal (with 3 service stars)
Global War on Terrorism Expeditionary Medal
Global War on Terrorism Service Medal
Korea Defense Service Medal
Armed Forces Service Medal
Humanitarian Service Medal
Military Outstanding Volunteer Service Medal
Army Service Ribbon
Army Overseas Service Ribbon with bronze award numeral 3
German Bundeswehr Gold Cross of Honour
Polish Army Medal in Gold
Kuwait Liberation Medal (Saudi Arabia)
Kuwait Liberation Medal (Kuwait)
Combat Action Badge
Basic Parachutist Badge
Joint Chiefs of Staff Identification Badge
German Armed Forces Badge for Military Proficiency in Gold
1st Cavalry Regiment Distinctive Unit Insignia
1st Armored Division Combat Service Identification Badge
5 Overseas Service Bars

Military offices
Preceded by None	Deputy Commanding General of Initial Military Training; 2009–2011	Succeeded by Richard C. Longo
Preceded by Carter F. Ham	Commanding General, United States Army Europe; 2011–2012	Succeeded by James C. Boozer
