= William Gayler =

U.S. Army general

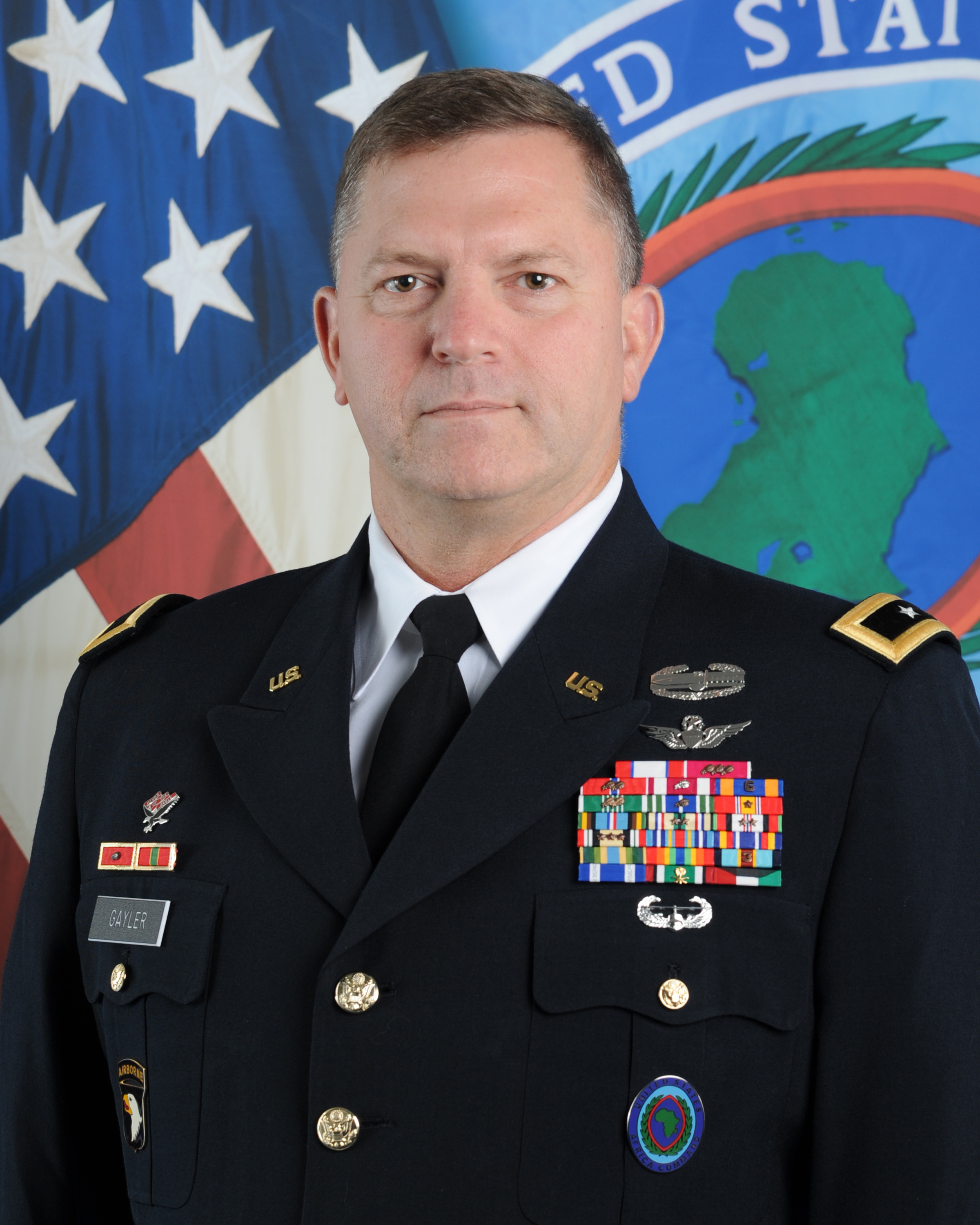
- Military career
- Allegiance: United States
- Branch: United States Army
- Service years: 1988–2021
- Rank: Major General
- Commands: United States Army Aviation Center of Excellence

William K. Gayler is a retired United States Army major general who last served as the Chief of Staff of the United States Africa Command from July 2020 to June 2021. Previously, he served as the Director of Operations of the United States Africa Command. Gayler earned a bachelor's degree in marketing from North Georgia College in 1988. He later received a master's degree in military arts and sciences from the Army Command and General Staff College and a second master's degree in national security strategy from the National War College.

Military offices
Preceded by Walter E. Piatt	Deputy Commanding General of the United States Army Europe; 2015–2016	Succeeded by Timothy P. McGuire
Preceded by Michael D. Lundy	Commanding General of the United States Army Aviation Center of Excellence; 2016–2019	Succeeded by David J. Francis
Preceded by Gregg P. Olson	Director of Operations and Cyber of the United States Africa Command; 2019–2020	Succeeded by Joel K. Tyler
Preceded by Todd B. McCaffrey	Chief of Staff of the United States Africa Command; 2020–2021	Succeeded by Joel K. Tyler
