= Brian Mennes =

U.S. Army general

Brian J. Mennes
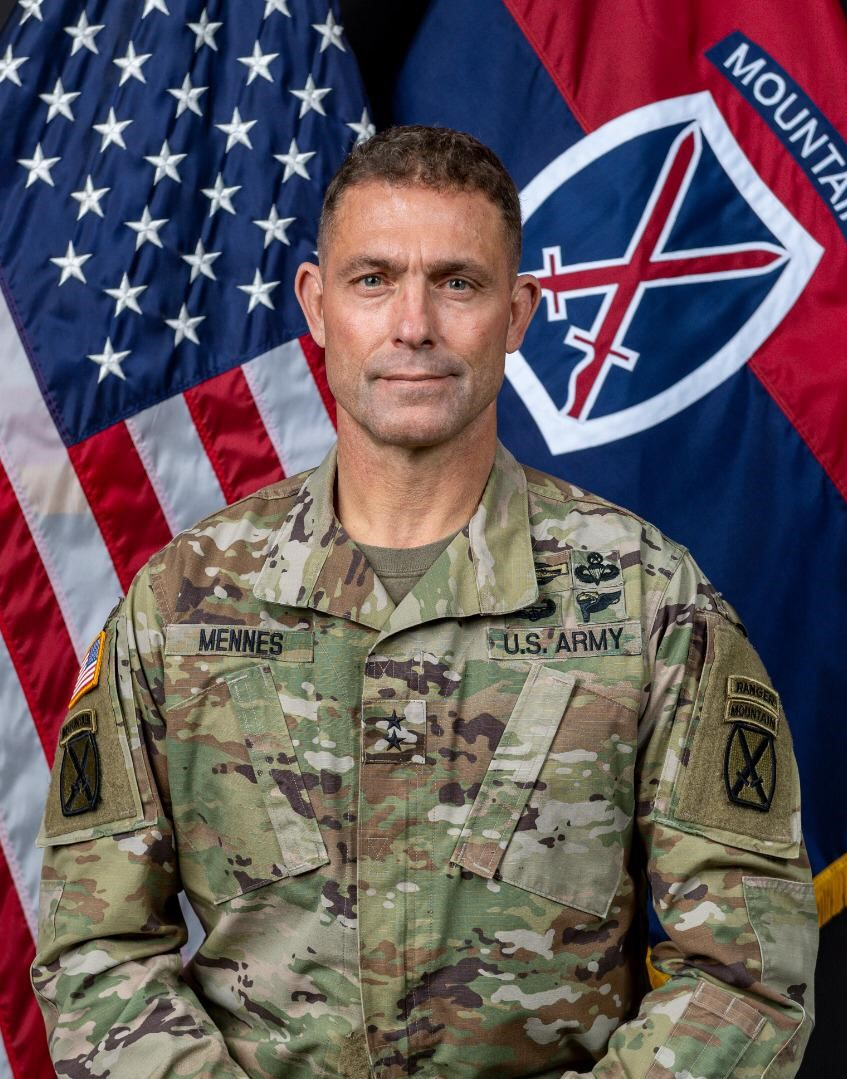
- Born: April 26, 1966 (age 60); New Mexico, U.S.
- Education: United States Military Academy (BS); United States Army Command and General Staff College (MMAS)
- Military career
- Allegiance: United States
- Branch: United States Army
- Service years: 1988–2023
- Rank: Major General
- Commands: 10th Mountain Division; Fort Drum; 4th Brigade, 82nd Airborne Division; 1st Battalion, 75th Ranger Regiment; 1st Battalion, 508th Parachute Infantry Regiment
- Conflicts: United States invasion of Panama; War in Afghanistan; Iraq War
- Awards: Army Distinguished Service Medal; Defense Superior Service Medal; Legion of Merit (5); Bronze Star Medal (5)

Brian Joseph Mennes (born April 26, 1966) is a retired United States Army major general who was the deputy commanding general of the XVIII Airborne Corps. He previously served as commanding general of the 10th Mountain Division and Fort Drum from May 1, 2019, to July 12, 2021, and as director of force management of the United States Army.

Born in New Mexico, Mennes graduated from the United States Military Academy with a B.S. degree in mechanical engineering in May 1988. He later earned a Master of Military Art and Science degree from the Army Command and General Staff College.

In June 2021, Mennes was nominated for promotion to lieutenant general. Pending confirmation, Mennes was assigned as deputy commanding general of the XVIII Airborne Corps, replacing the nomination previously filled by Xavier T. Brunson, who become deputy commanding general of I Corps instead. On September 20, 2021, Mennes' nomination and recommendation for promotion were withdrawn.

Military offices
| Preceded by Maria R. Gervais | Deputy Commanding General of the United States Army Cadet Command; 2014–2015 | Succeeded by Sean A. Gainey |
| Preceded by Richard C. Kim | Deputy Commanding General for Maneuver of the 2nd Infantry Division; 2015–2016 | Succeeded by Johnnie L. Johnson |
| Preceded by Viet X. Luong | Director of Joint and Integration of the United States Army; 2016–2017 | Succeeded by John S. Laskodi |
| Preceded by Michael L. Howard | Director of Force Management of the United States Army; 2017–2019 | Succeeded by Peter N. Benchoff |
| Preceded by Walter E. Piatt | Commanding General of the 10th Mountain Division; 2019–2021 | Succeeded by Milford H. Beagle Jr. |
| Preceded by James E. Kraft Jr. | Deputy Commanding General of the XVIII Airborne Corps; 2021–present | Incumbent |
