= Michael Lundy =

Retired U.S. Army general

Michael D. Lundy
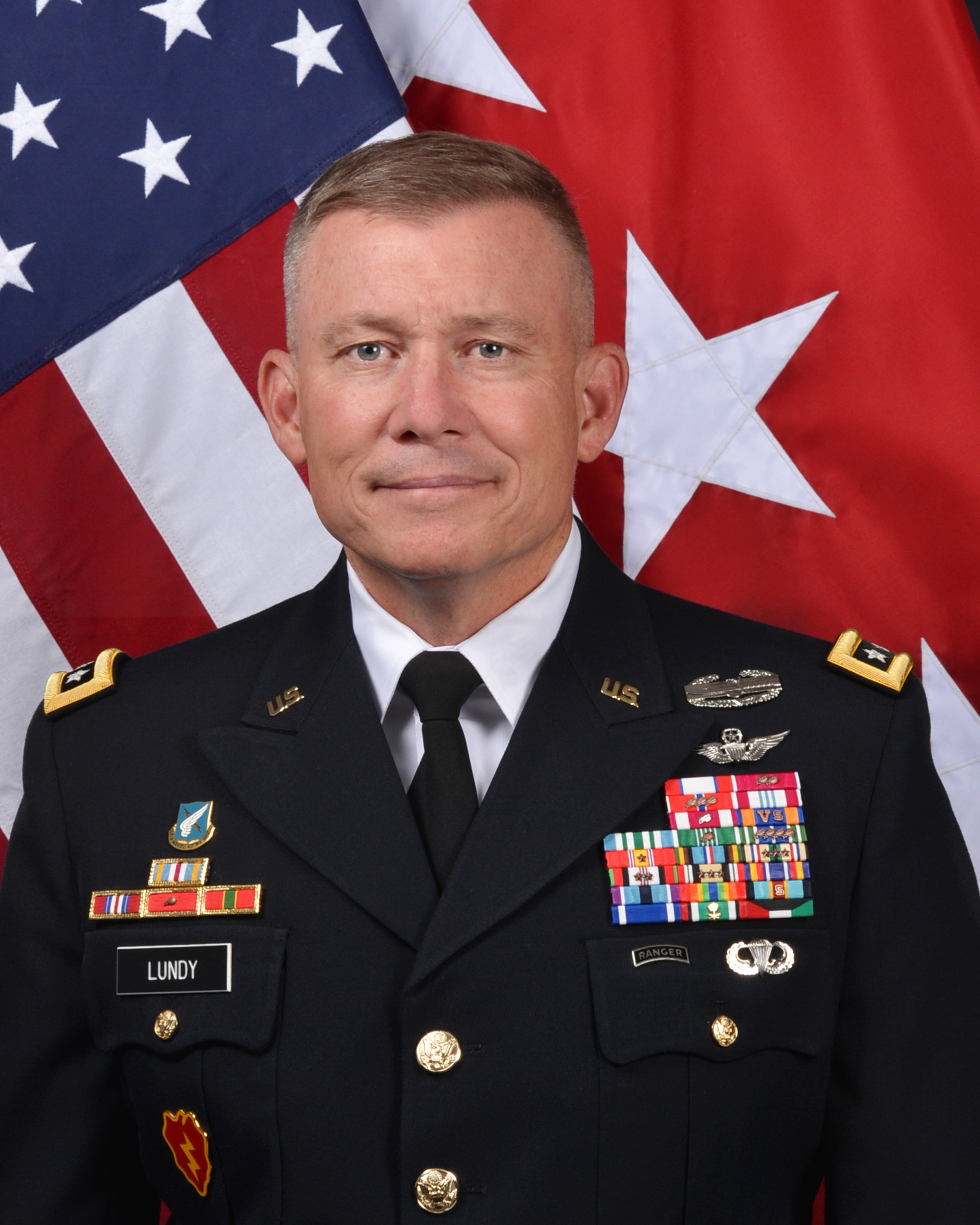
- Alma mater: McNeese State University (BS); United States Army Command and General Staff College; United States Army War College (MS)
- Spouse: Paula Lundy (m. 1987)
- Children: 2
- Military career
- Allegiance: United States
- Branch: United States Army
- Service years: 1987–2020
- Rank: Lieutenant General
- Conflicts: Gulf War; Operation Uphold Democracy; War in Afghanistan; Iraq War
- Awards: Army Distinguished Service Medal; Legion of Merit (3); Bronze Star Medal (4)

Michael D. Lundy is a retired United States Army lieutenant general. He last served as commanding general of the United States Army Combined Arms Center, dual-hatted as commandant of the United States Army Command and General Staff College, deputy commanding for combined arms of the United States Army Training and Doctrine Command and commanding general of Fort Leavenworth from June 1, 2016, to December 16, 2019. He previously served as commanding general of the United States Army Aviation Center of Excellence and Fort Novosel from March 2014 to April 2016. He retired in 2020 after 33 years of distinguished service.

Lundy was commissioned as a second lieutenant via the ROTC training program at McNeese State University in 1987, where he earned a Bachelor of Science and majored in botany. He attended the United States Army Command and General Staff College and the United States Army War College, the latter of which he received an M.S. degree in strategic studies.

In February 2020, Lundy became a senior mentor for USACAC's Mission Command Training Program. He is married to Paula and has two daughters.

== Dates of rank ==
Rank	Date
Brigadier general	October 4, 2012
Major general	July 22, 2014
Lieutenant general	June 1, 2016

Military offices
Preceded by ???	Deputy Commanding General for Support of the 1st Armored Division; 2011-2012	Succeeded by ???
Preceded by Robert P. White	Deputy Commanding General for Training of the United States Army Combined Arms Center; 2012-2014	Succeeded by Joseph M. Martin
Preceded by Kevin W. Mangum	Commanding General of the United States Army Aviation Center of Excellence; 2014-2016	Succeeded by William K. Gayler
Preceded by John S. Kem; Acting	Commanding General of the United States Army Combined Arms Center and Commandant of the United States Army Command and General Staff College; 2016-2019	Succeeded by James E. Rainey
