= Milford Beagle Jr. =

U.S. Army general

Milford H. Beagle Jr.
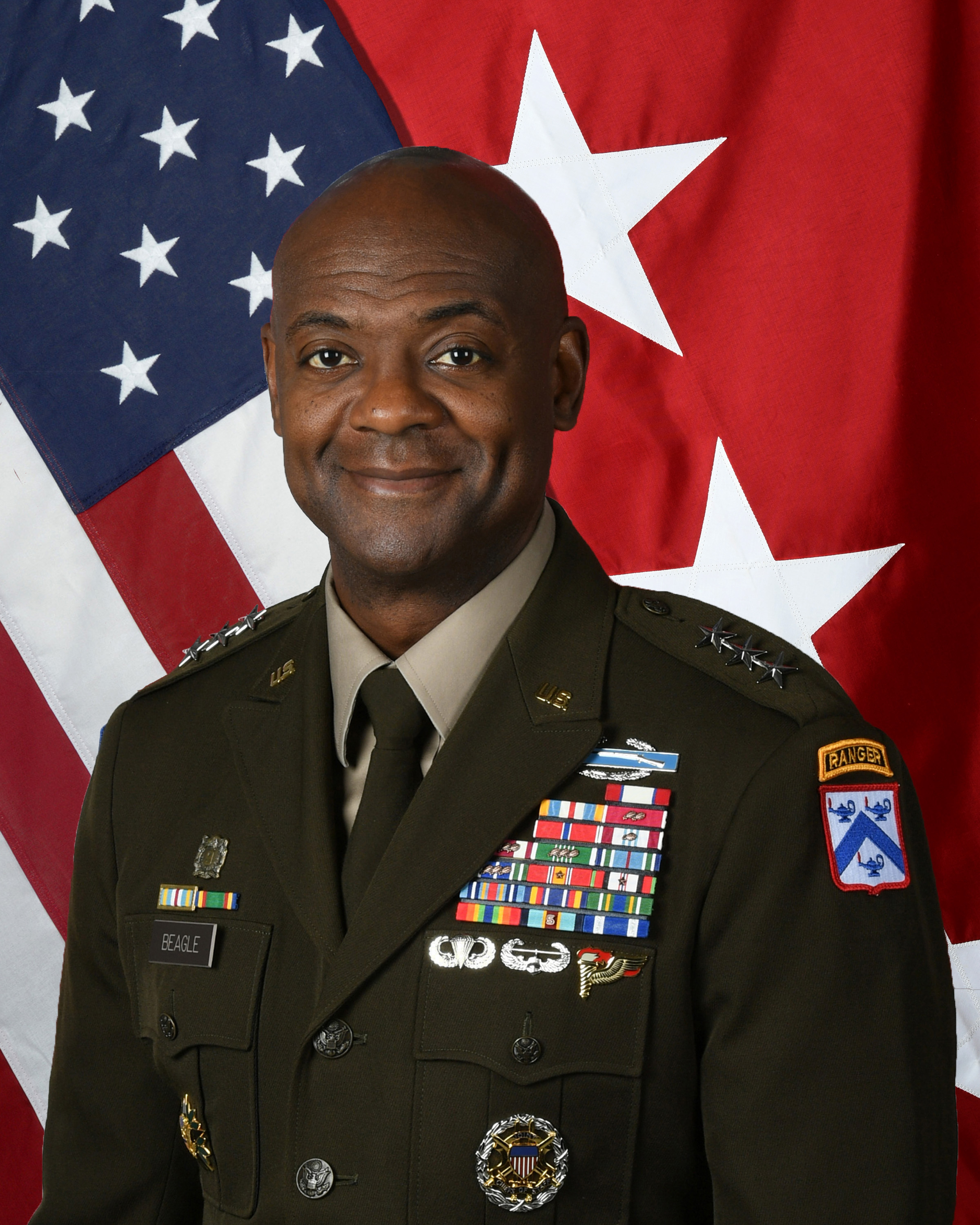
- Education: South Carolina State University (BS); Kansas State University (MS); United States Army Command and General Staff College (MAMS)
- Military career
- Allegiance: United States
- Branch: United States Army
- Service years: 1990–2025
- Rank: Lieutenant General
- Nickname: Beags
- Commands: United States Army Combined Arms Center; United States Army Command and General Staff College; 10th Mountain Division; United States Army Training Center; 193rd Infantry Brigade
- Conflicts: War in Afghanistan
- Awards: Defense Superior Service Medal; Legion of Merit (3); Bronze Star Medal

Milford H. Beagle Jr. is a retired United States Army lieutenant general who last served as commanding general of the United States Army Combined Arms Center and commandant of the United States Army Command and General Staff College from 4 October 2022 to 5 September 2025. He served as the commanding general of the 10th Mountain Division and Fort Drum from 12 July 2021 to 9 September 2022. Beagle previously served as the 51st commanding general of the United States Army Training Center at Fort Jackson from 22 June 2018 to 18 June 2021. He has also served as deputy commanding general for support of the 10th Mountain Division from 2017 to 2018 and commander of the 193rd Infantry Brigade from 2013 to 2016.

The great-grandson of World War I veteran Walter Beagles, Beagle is the second African American to command the 10th Mountain Division since Lloyd Austin's tenure from 2003 to 2005. He is a native of Enoree, South Carolina, and is married to the former Pamela Jones of Blackville, South Carolina, with whom he has two sons. He received his commission from the ROTC program at the South Carolina State University, graduating with a Bachelor of Science degree in criminal justice, later earning a Master of Science degree in adult education from Kansas State University and a Master of Science degree in advanced military studies from the United States Army Command and General Staff College.

Military offices
Preceded by John P. Johnson	Commanding General of the United States Army Training Center; 2018–2021	Succeeded by Patrick R. Michaelis
Preceded by Brian J. Mennes	Commanding General of the 10th Mountain Division; 2021–2022	Succeeded by Gregory K. Anderson
Preceded by Theodore D. Martin	Commanding General of the United States Army Combined Arms Center and Commandant of the United States Army Command and General Staff College; 2022–2025	Succeeded by James P. Isenhower III
