= United States Army Center for Initial Military Training =

U.S. Army's initial training for new military personnel

United States Army Center For Initial Military Training
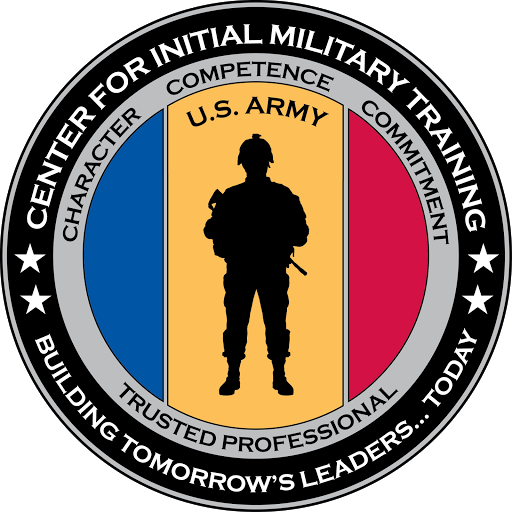
- Active: 2009-
- Country: United States
- Branch: United States Army
- Part of: United States Army Transformation and Training Command
- Garrison/HQ: Ft. Eustis, Virginia
- Website: https://www.army.mil/cimt

Commanders
- Current commander: Lt. Gen. David Francis
- Command Sergeant Major: CSM Michael McMurdy

Basic Training in the United States Army is the initial training for new military personnel typified by intense physical activity, psychological stress and the development of social cohesion. The United States Army Center for Initial Military Training (USACIMT) was created in 2009 under the U.S. Army Training and Doctrine Command to oversee training related issues.

== United States Army Center for Initial Military Training ==
The United States Army Center for Initial Military Training (USACIMT) was created by an act of Congress on September 24, 2009 under the U.S. Army Training and Doctrine Command (TRADOC) located at Fort Eustis in Newport News, Virginia. USACIMT was created as a separate, stand-alone organization to maintain senior-level oversight of training related issues.

USACIMT is the Core Function Lead for TRADOC for all initial entry training. This provides a process that aligns the development of competencies (knowledge, skills, abilities, and attributes) and behaviors in civilian volunteers for them to become Soldiers who are physically ready, grounded in Army Values, and competent in their skills so can contribute as leaders or members upon arrival at their first unit of assignment. Initial Military Training includes the developing baseline proficiency on warrior tasks, battle drills, and critical skills associated with their Military Occupational Specialty (MOS) or officer basic branch. USACIMT is the official command responsible for the Army's Initial Entry Training (IET), commonly referred to as "Basic Training" or BCT for enlisted soldiers (the term "Boot Camp" pertains to the United States Marine Corps). USACIMT develops policies to improve and standardize training for Basic Combat Training (BCT), Advanced Individual Training (AIT), One Station Unit Training (OSUT), and the second phase of the Basic Officer Leadership Course (BOLC).[3][4]

In 2018, USACIMT became the proponent for the Army's Holistic Health and Fitness (H2F) System. The H2F System is the Army’s primary investment in Soldier readiness and lethality, optimal physical and non-physical performance, reduced injury rates, improved rehabilitation after injury, and increased overall effectiveness of the Total Army. H2F addresses the five domains of physical and non-physical readiness (physical, mental, sleep, nutrition, and spiritual) through a comprehensive, integrated system of governance, personnel, equipment/facilities, programming, and education to optimize individual Soldier readiness, reduce preventable injuries, improve rehabilitation outcomes after injury, and ensure Soldiers are physically and mentally prepared to fight and win our nation’s wars [6]. The Army Combat Fitness Test (ACFT), which is the assessment of the physical domain of the Army's Holistic Health and Fitness System, [7] became the Army’s physical fitness test of record in Spring 2022[7]. In 2022, USACIMT absorbed the mission of the Cohesive Assessment Team (CAT), which was established under the People First Task Force to help address harmful behaviors and build cohesion across the Total Army. The Cohesive Assessment Team is an organization of subject matter experts in various fields who conduct organizational climate assessments further to build cohesive, lethal, and fit teams. In 2023, the Cohesive Assessment Team was renamed to the Cohesive Assistance Team, based on a recommendation from one of the units the CAT had previously visited.

The Leader Training Brigade (LTB) conducts CIMT cadre leader development and provides training development oversight in support of the Soldier transformation process. It provides leader training across the Army in resilience and fitness skills and supports the overall health and welfare of the force. It also oversees the Expert Soldier Badge Test Management Office (ESB TMO) and administers the ESB standards published in TR 672-9 (Expert Soldier Badge). The ESB TMO validates Army brigades who train, test, and award the ESB to candidates who meet the standards. Additionally, the LTB has the following subordinate organizations: the Initial Military Training Leadership School, Task Force Marshall, U.S. Army Physical Fitness School, and the U.S. Army Master Resiliency School.

== USACIMT Major Subordinate Organizations ==
1. Basic Combat Training Center of Excellence, Fort Jackson (South Carolina)
2. 108th Training Command (IET), Charlotte, North Carolina
3. Leader Training Brigade, Fort Jackson, South Carolina

== Commanders ==
1. LTG Mark P. Hertling: 24 September 2009 – 8 March 2011
2. MG Richard Longo: 9 March 2011 – 2 March 2012
3. MG Bradley May: 3 March 2012 – 20 November 2013
4. MG Ross Ridge: 21 November 2013 – 2 July 2015
5. MG Anthony Funkhouser: 3 July 2015 – 19 July 2017
6. MG Malcolm B. Frost: 20 July 2017 - 26 April 2019
7. MG Lonnie G. Hibbard: 27 April 2019 - 27 September 2021
8. MG John D. Kline: 11 October 2021 – 1 August 2024
9. LTG David J. Francis: 1 August 2024 – present
