= David J. Francis (general) =

U.S. Army general officer

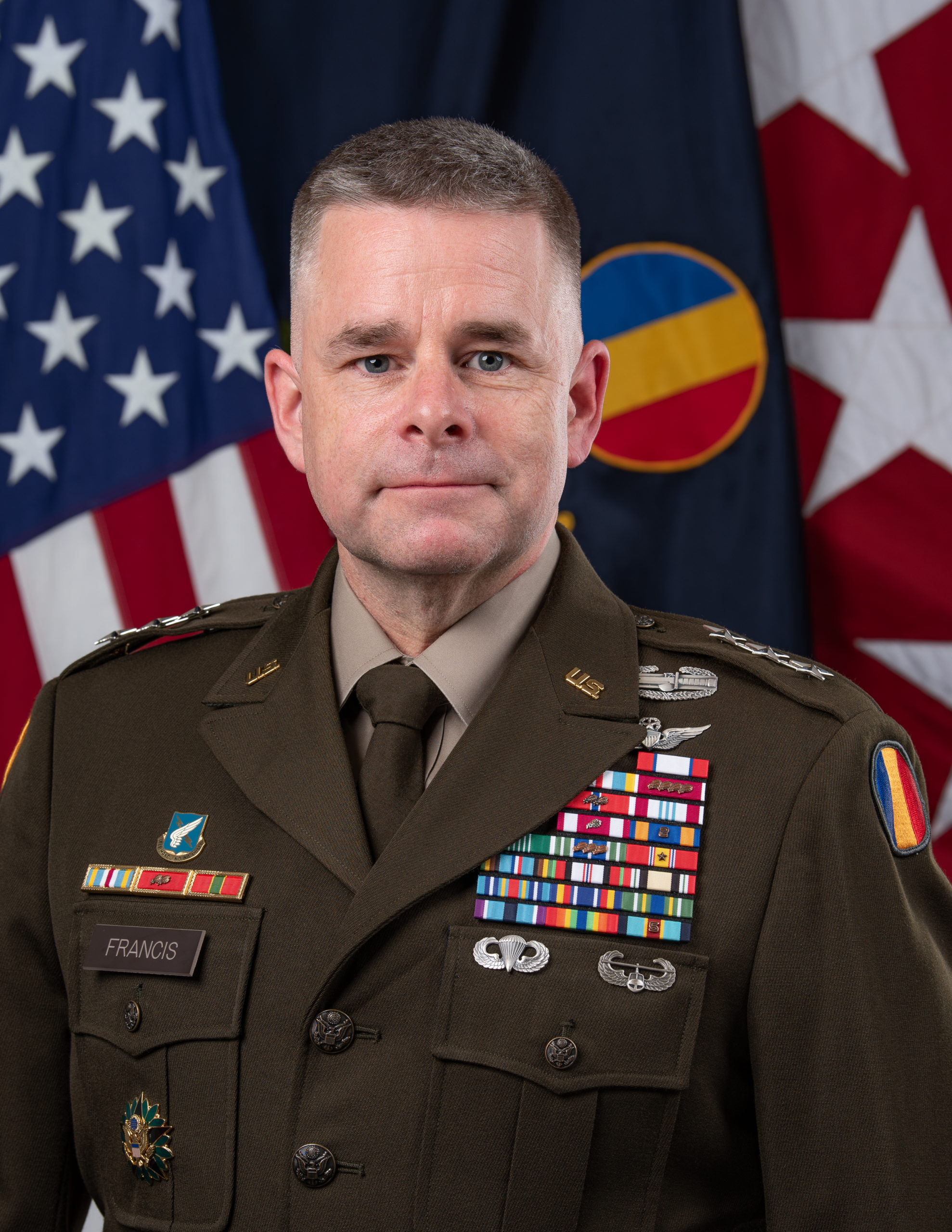
- Official portrait, 2024
- Born: c. 1962 (age 63–64)
- Military career
- Allegiance: United States
- Branch: United States Army
- Service years: 1989–present
- Rank: Lieutenant General
- Commands: United States Army Center for Initial Military Training; United States Army Aviation Center of Excellence; Fort Rucker; United States Army Combat Readiness Center; Combat Aviation Brigade, 10th Mountain Division; 2nd Battalion, 25th Aviation Regiment; 2nd Battalion (Assault), 82nd Aviation Brigade
- Awards: Army Distinguished Service Medal; Legion of Merit (4); Bronze Star Medal (2)

David J. Francis (born c. 1962) is a United States Army lieutenant general who has served as the deputy commanding general of the United States Army Training and Doctrine Command and commanding general of the United States Army Center for Initial Military Training since August 2024. He most recently served as the chief of staff of the United States Africa Command from 2023 to 2024. He previously served as the director of operations and cyber of the United States Africa Command from 2022 to 2023.

In June 2024, Francis was nominated for promotion to lieutenant general and appointment as deputy commanding general of the United States Army Training and Doctrine Command and commanding general of the United States Army Center for Initial Military Training.

Military offices
Preceded by Jeffrey A. Farnsworth	Commanding General of the United States Army Combat Readiness Center and Director of Army Safety; 2017–2018	Succeeded by Timothy J. Daugherty
Preceded by Frank W. Tate	Director of Army Aviation of the United States Army; 2018–2019	Succeeded by Michael C. McCurry II
Preceded by William Gayler	Commanding General of the United States Army Aviation Center of Excellence and Fort Rucker; 2019–2022	Succeeded by Michael C. McCurry II
Preceded by Gregory K. Anderson	Director of Operations and Cyber of the United States Africa Command; 2022–2023	Succeeded by Claude Tudor
Preceded by Neil S. Hersey	Chief of Staff of the United States Africa Command; 2023–2024	Succeeded by Matthew Trollinger
Preceded by Maria Gervais	Deputy Commanding General of the United States Army Training and Doctrine Command; 2024–present	Incumbent
Preceded by John D. Kline	Commanding General of the United States Army Center for Initial Military Training; 2024–present	Incumbent
