= Richard Longo =

Richard C. Longo
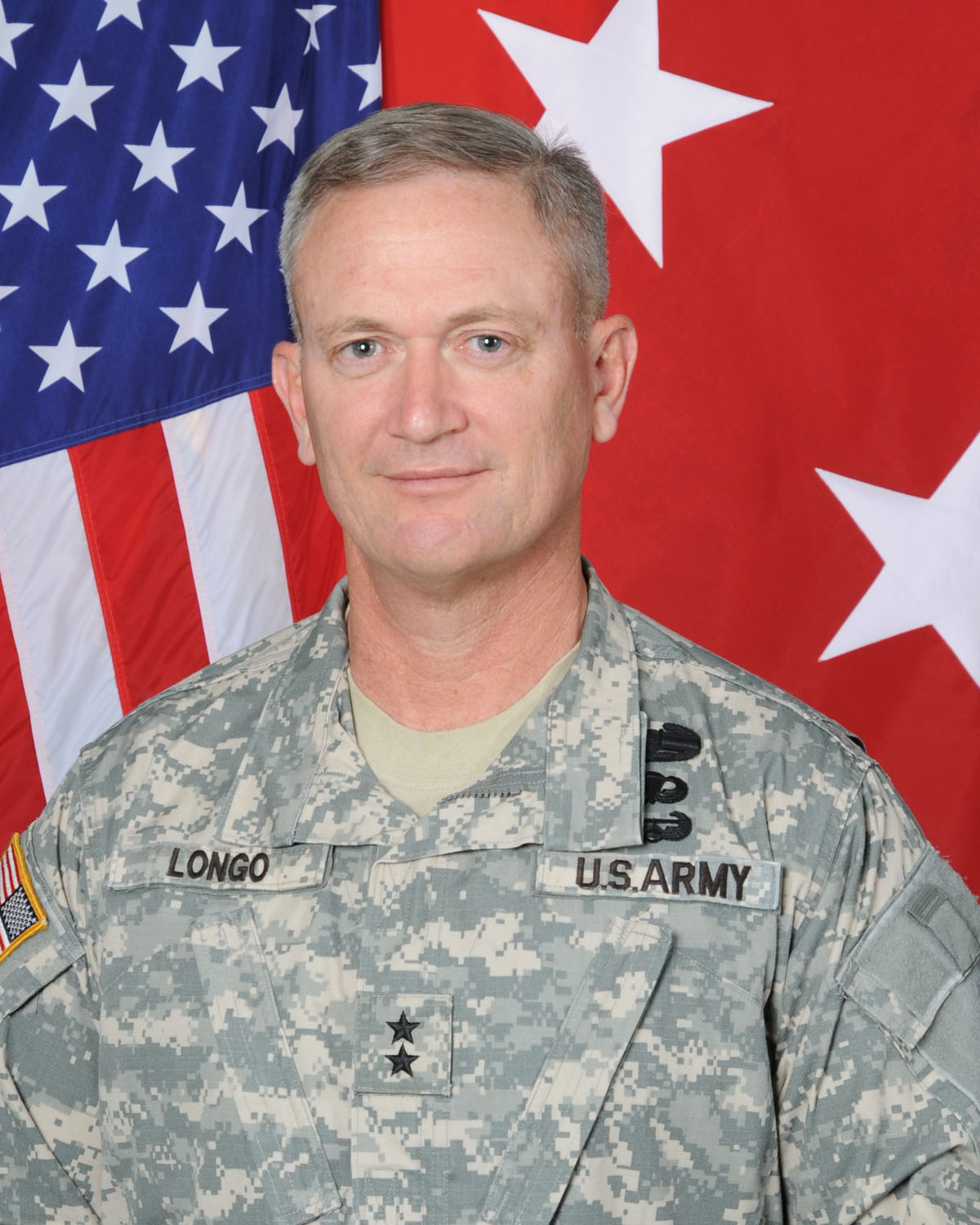
- Major General Richard Longo, USA; Retired
- Military career
- Allegiance: United States of America
- Branch: United States Army
- Service years: 1980–2014
- Rank: Major General
- Commands: Initial Military Training
- Conflicts: Operation Iraqi Freedom
- Awards: Bronze Star; Meritorious Service Medal (4); Army Commendation Medal (1); Army Achievement Medal (3); Combat Action Badge; Parachutist Badge; Air Assault Badge; Army Staff Identification Badge

Richard C. Longo is a retired major general of the United States Army. At the time of his retirement on 22 July 2014, he was deputy commanding general and chief of staff for U.S. Army Europe. He previously served as the deputy commanding general for Initial Military Training for the United States Army Training and Doctrine Command (TRADOC) at Fort Monroe, Virginia.

== Recent commands ==
As the Deputy Commanding General for Initial Military Training, Longo is responsible for initial training of both officers and enlisted soldiers at 27 installations across the United States. IMT has led change in several areas, to include integrating new training methods into Basic Combat Training, Advanced Individual Training and Basic Officer Leadership Courses. IMT revised the Army's Warrior Tasks and Battle Drills and further developed training in rifle marksmanship, combatives, values instruction, first-aid, and culture. IMT's "Soldier Athlete" initiative also generated changes in Physical Readiness Training, introduced Athletic Trainers and Physical Therapists to training units, and integrated performance nutrition into dining facilities (Fueling the Soldier). Completing Soldier Athlete, Longo is leading the change for the Army's new Physical Fitness Test in 2011.

Prior to becoming DCG-IMT, Longo served as the Deputy Chief of Staff, G-3/5/7 for TRADOC at Fort Monroe, Virginia. As the TRADOC G-3, he coordinated the efforts of the headquarters staff and its major subordinate organizations toward building a campaign-capable, expeditionary, and versatile Army in support of the Joint Warfighting Commander.

== Biography ==
Major General Longo serves as the Deputy Commanding General for Initial Military Training for the United States Army Training and Doctrine Command at Fort Monroe, Virginia. Previous to taking command, Longo served as the Deputy Chief of Staff, G-3/5/7 for the United States Army Training and Doctrine Command (TRADOC) at Fort Monroe, Virginia.

Prior to arriving at Fort Monroe, MG Longo served as the Director of Training, Office of the Deputy Chief of Staff G- 3/5/7, Headquarters, Department of the Army in Washington, DC. An artillery officer, he has commanded the 1st Infantry Division Artillery, United States Army Europe and Seventh Army, Germany including a combat deployment to Iraq during OPERATION IRAQI FREEDOM II; 1st Battalion, 14th Field Artillery (MLRS) at Fort Sill, Oklahoma; and at the battery level with 1st Battalion, 333rd Field Artillery in Wiesbaden, Germany. MG Longo also served as the Deputy Commander/Assistant Commandant, United States Army Field Artillery Center and School at Fort Sill.

His previous staff experience includes assignments as the Chief of Staff, U.S. Army, Pacific; Executive Officer to the Deputy Commanding General, United States Army Europe; G3, III Corps Artillery and Chief of Task Force XXI, both at Fort Sill; Chief, Operations Division at the George C. Marshall European Center for Security Studies in Garmisch, Germany; Executive Officer in 2d Battalion, 82d Field Artillery and Deputy Fire Support Coordinator for the 1st Cavalry Division at Ft Hood, Texas; Assistant Fire Support Coordinator for III Corps at Fort Hood; Plans Officer and Secretary of the General Staff in III Corps Artillery, again at Fort Sill. He also served as an Assistant Professor of Military Science at the University of North Carolina at Wilmington.

MG Longo was commissioned in 1980 after graduating from Furman University with a Bachelor of Arts degree in Business Administration. He also holds master's degrees in Economics from the University of Oklahoma and in Strategic Studies from the United States Army War College in Carlisle, Pennsylvania.

His military education includes the Field Artillery Officers’ Basic Course, the Infantry Officers’ Advanced Course, the Command and General Staff College and the United States Army War College. His awards and decorations include the Legion of Merit, the Bronze Star Medal, the Defense Meritorious Service Medal, the Army Meritorious Service Medal, the Joint Service Commendation Medal, the Army Commendation Medal, and the Army Achievement Medal. He is also a recipient of the Combat Action Badge, Parachutist Badge, and Air Assault Badge.

Major General Longo is married and has four children, a granddaughter, and two grandsons.
