= United States Army Combat Readiness Center =

Coordinates: 31.343654°N 85.707995°W

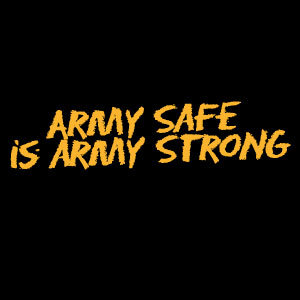
- Army Safe is Army Strong logo
- Country: United States
- Branch: United States Army
- Garrison/HQ: Fort Rucker, Alabama

The U.S. Army Combat Readiness Center (USACRC) is a United States Army organization. The Army Safety Team provides safety and risk management expertise to the Army, DoD, and other agencies; develops, maintains and evaluates Army Safety policy and programs; and communicates relevant risk management information to Army Leaders for the preservation of our Soldiers, Civilians, Families and vital resources. It is located at Fort Rucker, Alabama, alongside the Army's major flight training unit.

The center has developed a myriad of tools and resources that reinforce the sound principles of risk management. These resources are a means to assist Leaders, Soldiers, Army Civilians and Managers, and Family members in successfully and safely completing their missions, jobs and off-duty activities while mitigating the harmful effects of risk. The USACRC website hosts many tools to identify hazards, reduce risk and prevent both accidental and tactical loss. The USACRC's objective is to keep all Army personnel and their Family members safe and strong.

It is commanded by Brigadier General Jonathan Byrom.

== History ==
The U. S. Army Combat Readiness Safety Center traces its origin to the Army Accident Review Board, a section of the Army Aviation Training Department of the Artillery School at Fort Sill, Oklahoma. The Review Board consisted of two officers and one enlisted. As Army aviation expanded, so did the work of the Review Board, which was moved to Fort Rucker in Alabama, with the U.S. Army Aviation School in 1954.

The Review Board was renamed the U.S. Army Board for Aviation Accident Research in 1957. USABAAR's mission included not only the review of aircraft accident reports but also crash-site investigations and research into aviation safety matters involving aircraft design, operations, and training as well as supervision, maintenance, inspection, and human factors.

In 1972, USABAAR became the U.S. Army Agency for Aviation Safety under the supervision of the director of Army Aviation, Office of the Assistant Chief of Staff for Force Development. Responsibilities of USAAAVS were expanded to include accident prevention education, safety assistance visits Army-wide, establishment of Army aviation safety policy, collection of all Army aviation accident data, promotion of system safety, and support of selected aspects of the Army's ground safety program. USAAAVS was under the supervision of the Inspector General from 1974 to 1978. In 1978, it became a field operating agency of the Deputy Chief of Staff for Personnel, and its mission was further expanded. USAAAVS assumed responsibility for both aviation and ground safety and was renamed the U.S. Army Safety Center.

The Commander of the Army Safety Center became the deputy director of Army Safety in October 1983. The Safety Center was given Army staff responsibility for implementation of the Army Safety Program and served as the primary advisor on accident prevention to the Department of the Army. In July 1987, the Safety Center became a field operating agency of the Chief of Staff of the Army. The commander of the Safety Center was designated as the director of Army Safety. The director of Army Safety was made a general officer position, reporting through the Director of the Army Staff to the Chief of Staff, Army.

Following the September 11 attacks and the resulting U.S. military action, United States Department of Defense leadership recognized the enormous impact that accidental loss had, and continues to have, on the readiness and capability of the Army. As a result, January 31, 2005, the U.S. Army Safety Center was redesignated as the U.S. Army Combat Readiness Center with an expanded mission to become the center of gravity for all loss-related areas. As the Army's knowledge center for loss data collection, analysis and information dissemination, the USACRC assists the Army with the preservation of combat power through the application of Risk Management in order to stop Soldiers getting hurt.

== Scope ==
Most Army accidental deaths occur while Soldiers are off duty, and statistics from fiscal 2011 reveal there were 136 off-duty accidental fatalities compared to only 40 on-duty. For soldiers who are at home or play, privately owned vehicle accidents are the most prevalent cause of death. Sedans and motorcycles were involved in most of these incidents.

Risk management is the Army's primary decision-making process to identify hazards, reduce risk and prevent accidents and can be used by Soldiers at any time even if they aren't at work. Besides urging Soldiers to use risk management both on and off duty, Leaders, battle buddies and Family members can help reduce off-duty deaths by getting involved in their Soldiers’ lives and helping them make better decisions.

The U.S. Army Combat Readiness Center has many tools and programs to help leaders, battle buddies and Family members identify risky behaviors, provide solutions and help prevent needless accidents both on and off duty.
