= Joint Modernization Command =

U.S. Army Joint Modernization Command
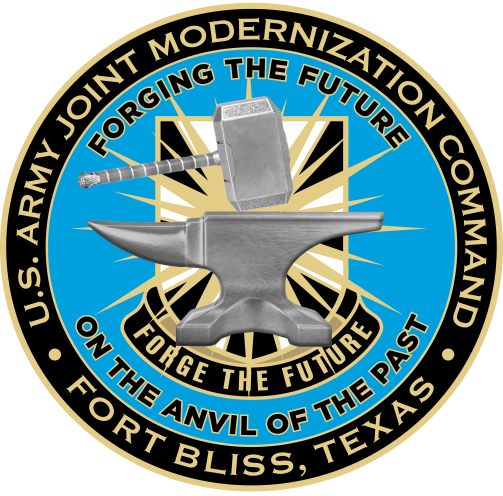
- JMC emblem
- Active: 2006–present
- Country: United States
- Branch: United States Army
- Type: Command
- Size: 250 employees
- Part of: United States Army Futures and Concepts Command
- Garrison/HQ: Fort Bliss, Texas
- Motto: "Forge the Future"
- Mascot: The Hammer
- Website: Official website link

Commanders
- Commanding general: BG Jennifer Mykins
- Command Sergeant Major: CSM Will L. Langes

Insignia
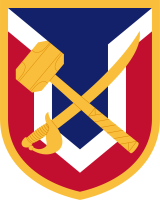
- Worn shoulder sleeve insignia

The U.S. Army Joint Modernization Command (JMC), (formerly known as the U.S. Army Brigade Modernization Command) is a United States Army command located at Fort Bliss, Texas. The JMC primarily functions to support two general goals; running field experiments and training exercises with army units in order to prepare the units for deployment, and conducting field testing of emerging technologies.

The Joint Modernization Command is subordinate to the Futures and Concepts Command (FCC) at Joint Base Langley–Eustis, Virginia, which is subordinate to the Transformation and Training Command (T2COM), based in Austin, Texas.

The JMC’s field experiments are intened to provide evidence and opportunities for feedback on emerging technologies which may be used to guide development of a variety of operational capabilities for the U.S. Army.

== Purpose ==
The Joint Modernization Command was created to serve many related purposes including the following:

- Conduct experiments to assess MDO Concepts, Capabilities, and Formations which can scale and be exported to other units for the 2028 MDO-Capable Force.
- Provide field experimentation and assessment support to Army Cross-Functional Teams in accordance with the Army Modernization Strategy.

== History ==
In 2006, the Chief of Staff of the United States Army directed the U.S. Army Capabilities Center, subordinate to the United States Army Training and Doctrine Command, to establish the Future Force Integration Directorate (FFID). The FFID would be the forerunner of the future JCM and it was initially tasked with testing and assessing equipment and concepts which were to be developed under the Army Future Combat Systems program.

In August 2007, the directorate's responsibilities were expanded to include a responsibility for coordinating more broad modernization efforts at a brigade level.

After the Future Combat Systems program was ended by the United States Secretary of Defense in April 2009, the FFID took over responsibility for evaluating the success and feasibility of subsequent brigade modernization programs throughout the Army.

=== 2010s ===
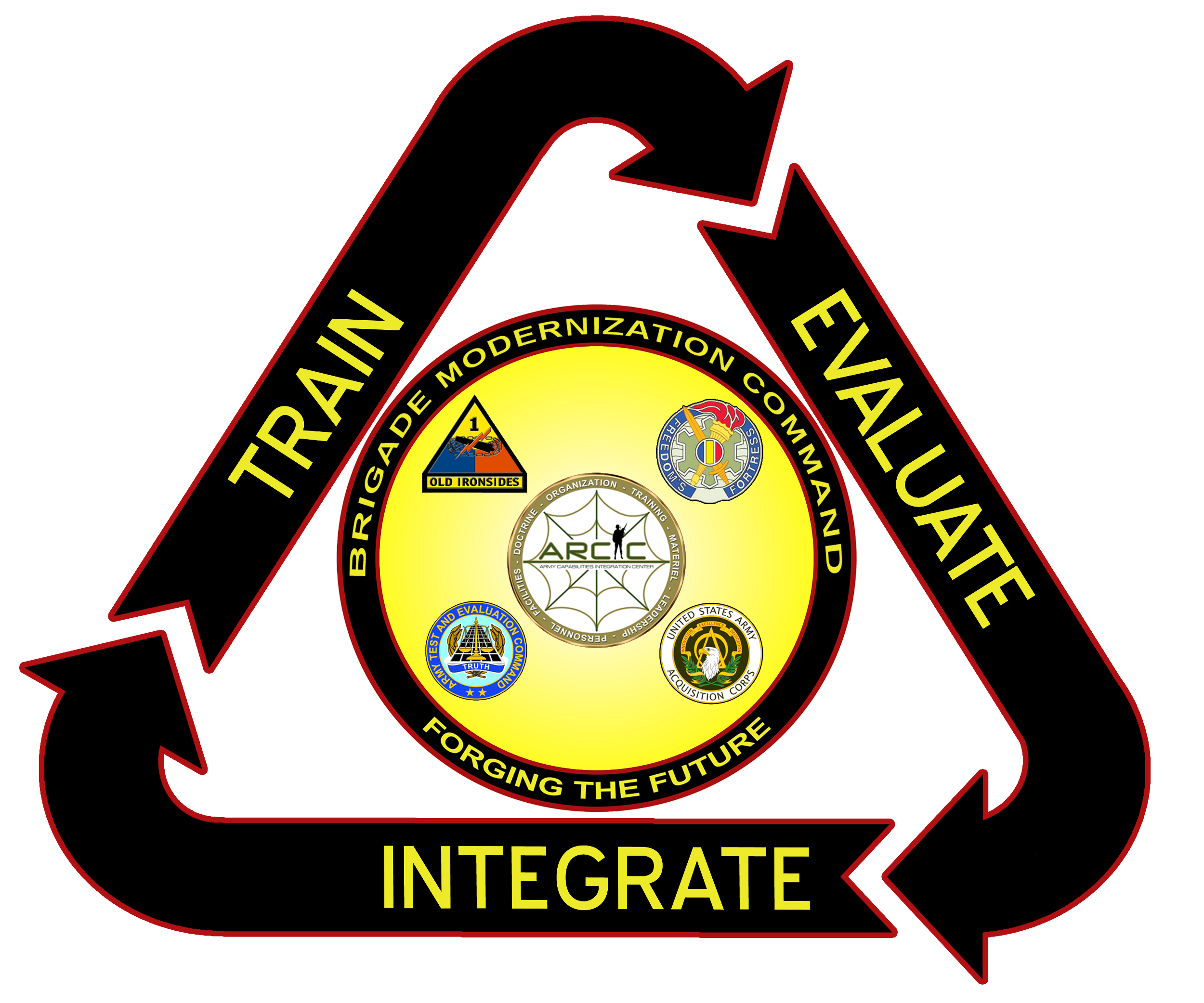
Brigade Modernization Command logo, 2011

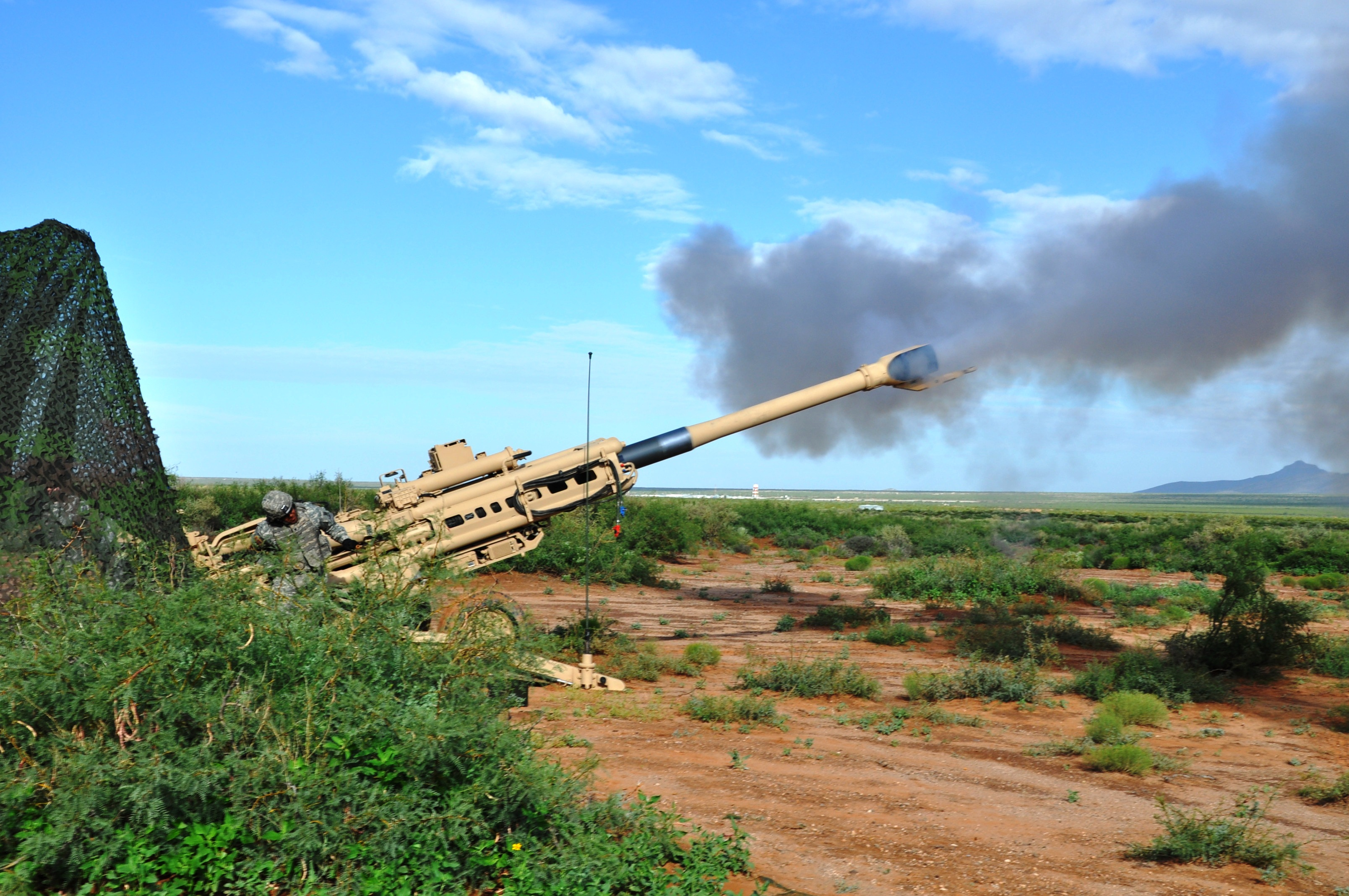
Soldiers firing the M777 Howitzer at White Sands Missile Range during an assessment in July 2010

In early 2011, the Army Chief of Staff issued a directive that renamed the FFID to the Brigade Modernization Command (BMC) with a focus on providing evaluations of planned moderinzation programs in order to provide Doctrine, Organization, Training, Materiel, Leadership and Education, Personnel, Facilities, and Policy recommendations.

In the years following the redesignation from FFID to BMC, the command developed Network Integration Evaluation (NIE) program. This program operated as a series of semi-annual evaluations which standardized how the Army understood the capabilities of the many disparate systems that made up its overarching tactical network of software and hardware. The final iteration of the NIE occurred in 2018 at Fort Bliss, Texas.

In 2017, the BMC was renamed as the U.S. Army Joint Modernization Command (JMC).

== Joint Warfighting Assessments ==
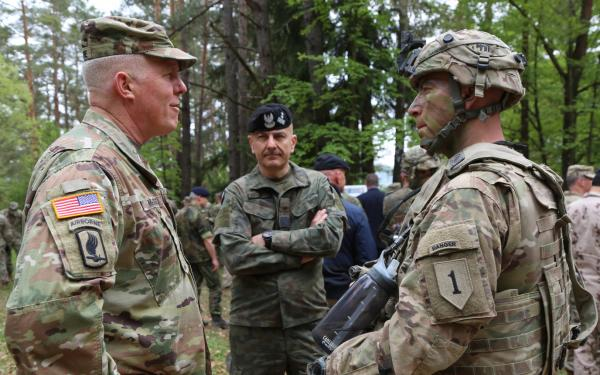
Multinational leaders observe new capabilities being assessed during JWA 18 in Germany, May 2018

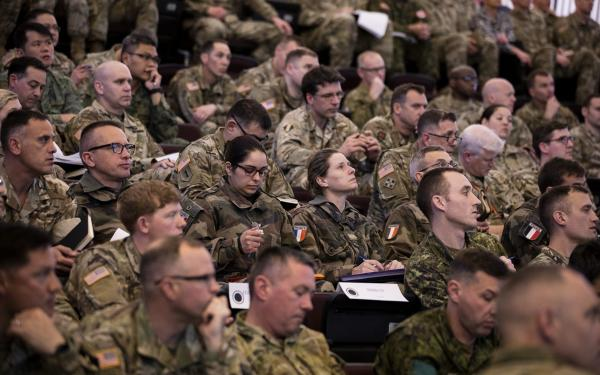
Multinational leaders participate in a Combined Arms Rehearsal during JWA 19 at Joint Base Lewis McChord, April 2019

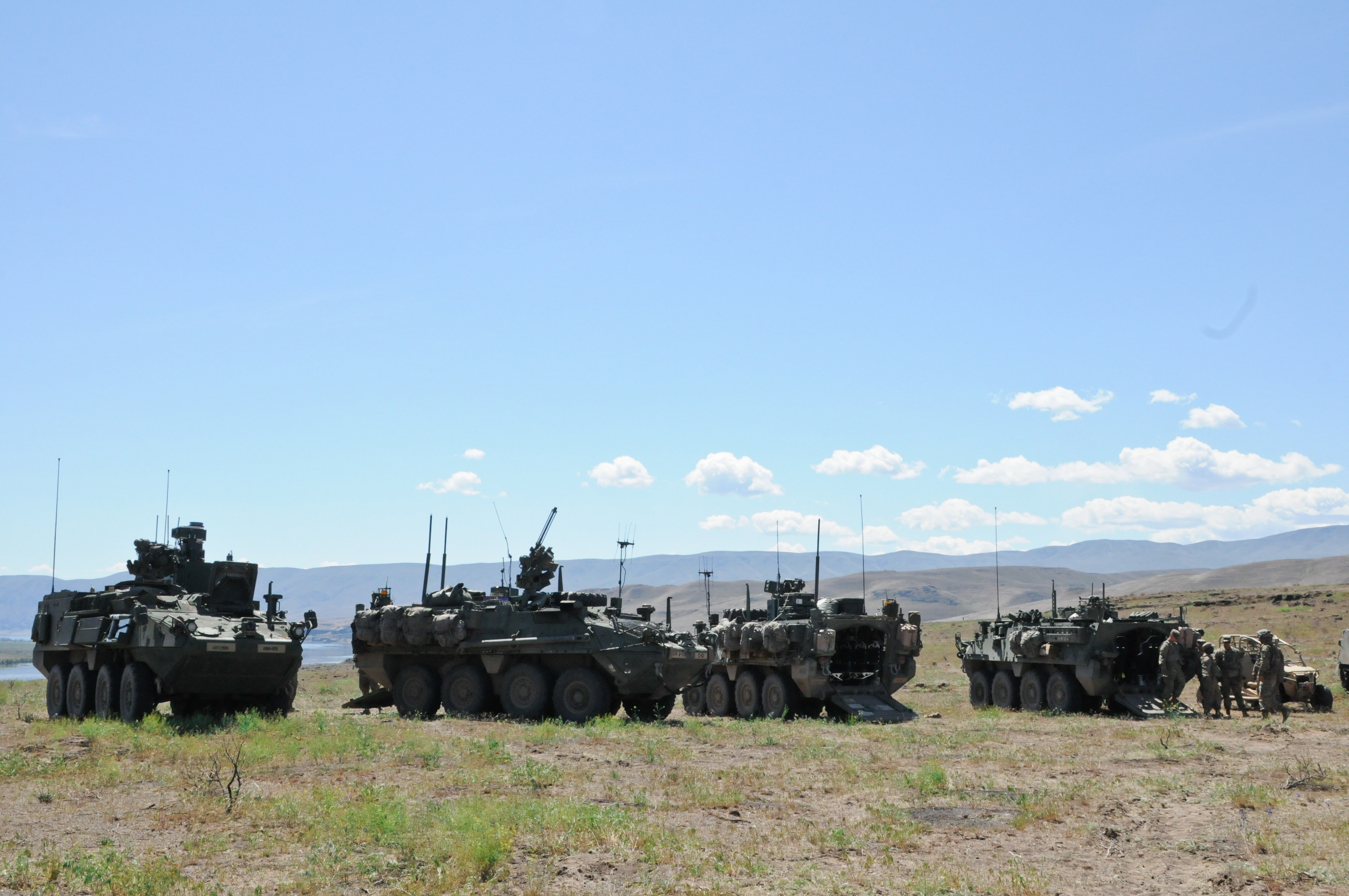
A Stryker platoon prepares for a combined arms breach during JWA 19 at Yakima Training Center in December 2019 (photo by PFC Valentina Montano)

One early outcome from the JMC was the creation of Joint Warfighting Assessments (JWA), which are large training and testing exercises run by the Army and which take place across army bases around the world. During these exercises, soldiers and units are run through drills which give them opportunities to test new equipment, new unit structures, and new strategies in simulated scenarios and conditions. The results from these assessments are used by the Army to determine which modernization elements to adopt into the wider military structure.

These assessments bring together forces from around the US Army as well as from allied nations to carry out exercises at scale, and are conducted in either the European or Pacific Area of Operations.

The first Joint Warfighting Assessment, known as JWA 18, was held in Europe in the spring of 2018.
