= Juanita Christensen =

American government official and electronics engineer

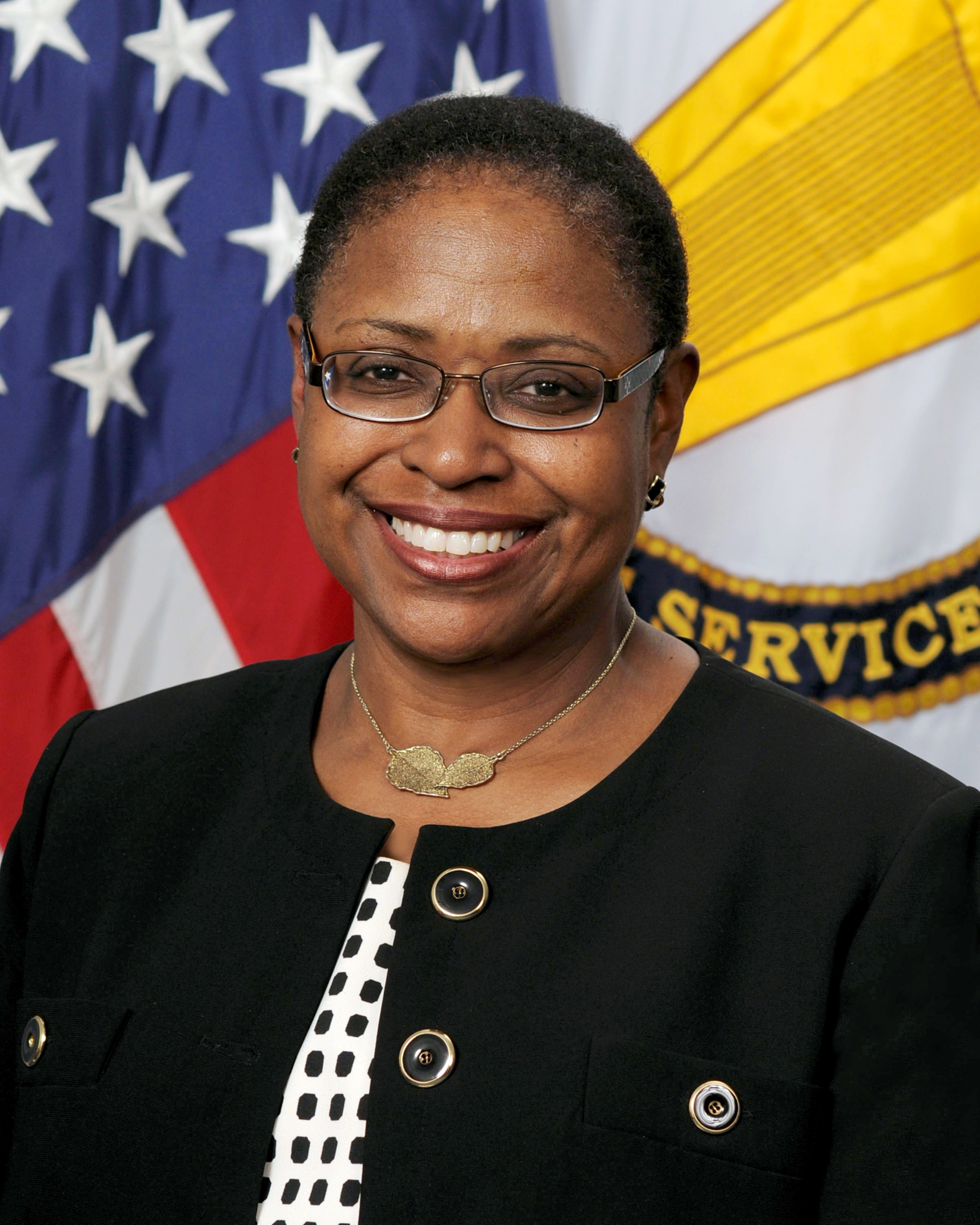
- Christensen in 2017
- Born: Juanita M. Denzmore; East St. Louis, Illinois, U.S.
- Other name: Juanita Harris
- Education: University of Illinois Urbana-Champaign; Webster University; University of Phoenix
- Occupations: Government official, engineer
- Children: 3

Juanita M. Christensen (formerly Harris) is an American government official and electronics engineer. She assumed leadership of the Defense Contract Management Agency's (DCMA) Technical Directorate in April 2023. She was previously the deputy chief of staff for logistics (G4) of facilities and environmental at the United States Army Materiel Command. From November 2017 until January 2021, Christensen was director of the United States Army Aviation and Missile Center. In February 2015, she became the first African-American woman from Redstone Arsenal to join the Senior Executive Service.

== Early life and education ==
Christensen was born to Clottele M. Denzmore. She was raised in East St. Louis, Illinois and excelled in math and science in high school. Christensen decided to pursue a degree in engineering, enrolling at the University of Illinois Urbana-Champaign. She faced racism as a black female in an engineering program. One professor stated he did not understand why she was in his class. She completed a Bachelor of Science degree in Computer Engineering from the University of Illinois in 1985. She was the first of her seven siblings to complete college.

Christensen earned a Master of Science degree in Computer Resources and Information Systems Management from Webster University in 1994. In February 2011, she completed a Doctor of Management in Organizational Leadership at the University of Phoenix School of Advanced Studies. Her dissertation was titled A Mentorship Study of Women in the Department of Defense Acquisition Sector. Shelia A. Vinson served as Christensen' doctoral mentor.

== Career ==
Christensen began her career as an electronics engineer with Boeing in St. Louis from May 1985 to May 1986, then moved to New London, Connecticut as a software engineer with Mystech Associates and Structured Technology from November 1986 to May 1988. She moved back to St. Louis to become a senior electronics engineer with McDonnell Aircraft Corporation from May 1988 to June 1991, then moved to Huntsville, Alabama as senior lead engineer of Comanche Systems/Software Engineering & Integration with General Dynamics Advanced Information Services (formerly Veridian). Christensen completed a corporate leadership development course with Veridan at the Bolger Center in 2003. From April 2004 to January 2005, Christensen served as principal systems and integration engineer for the cruise missile defense system, program management office, CAS, Inc. in Huntsville. She then became the held the same position for the unmanned aircraft systems program management office, supporting the extended range and multi-purpose UAVSDI Inc., from January 2005 to February 2007 in Huntsville.

Christensen worked as the director of the engineering analysis directorate at the United States Army Space and Missile Defense Command (SMDC) from February 2007 to September 2008, then became the technical management division chief in the project management office for unmanned aircraft systems (PM UAS), program executive office (PEO) aviation in Huntsville. In December 2011, Christensen was named a STEM Science Spectrum Trailblazer by the Black Engineer of the Year Award (BEYA) program. She received a BEYA alumni leadership award in May 2012. Christensen was deputy director for the aviation development directorate of the U.S. Army Aviation and Missile Research, Development and Engineering Center (AMRDEC), from August 2012 to February 2015. She completed training in the Defense Acquisition University executive leadership program in 2013. Christensen is certified by the Defense Acquisition Workforce Improvement Act, Level III, Systems Engineering Acquisition, and the Defense Acquisition Workforce Improvement Act, Level I, Program Management.

Christensen was selected for Senior Executive Service (SES) in February 2015. She was the first African-American woman from Redstone Arsenal to join the SES. Christensen accepted the position of acting executive deputy to the Commanding General, U.S. Army Research, Development and Engineering Command effective September 5, 2017. She is also the director of the AMRDEC weapons development and integration directorate (WDI). From November 26, 2017 until January 16, 2021, Christensen was director of AMRDEC. On January 17, 2021, she became the deputy chief of staff for logistics (G4) of facilities and environmental at the United States Army Materiel Command.

Christensen assumed leadership of DCMA’s Technical Directorate as a Tier II Senior Executive Service member in April 2023.

== Personal life ==
Christensen was married to Dwight Harris. She has two sons and a daughter. She married David Christensen.
