= ARCIC =

ARCIC may refer to:

- Anglican–Roman Catholic International Commission
- United States Army Capabilities Integration Center
