= Cedric T. Wins =

United States Army general

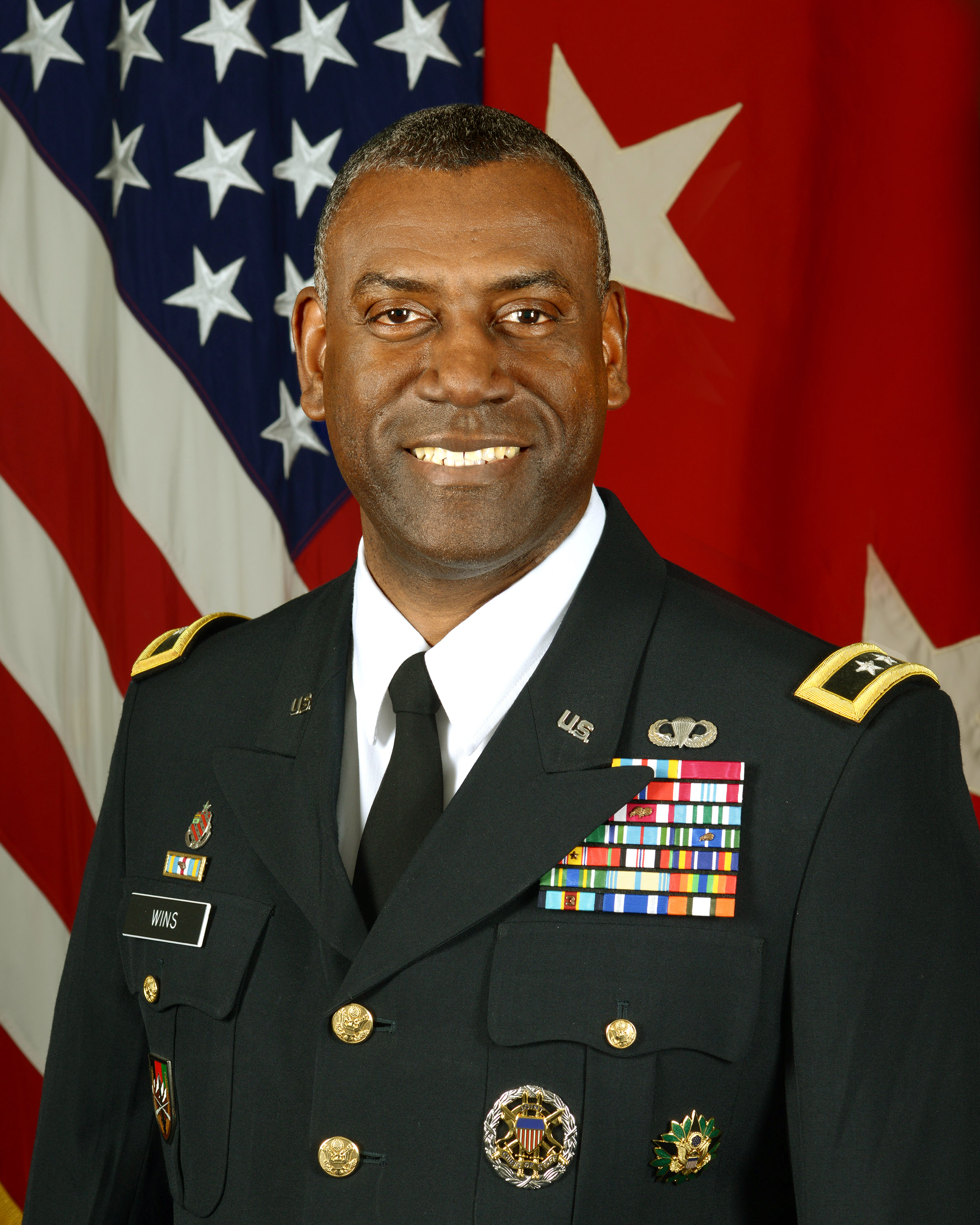

15th Superintendent of the Virginia Military Institute
- In office November 13, 2020; Interim: November 13, 2020 – April 15, 2021 – term ended: June 30, 2025
- Preceded by: J. H. Binford Peay III
- Succeeded by: David Furness

Personal details
- Born: Cedric Terry Wins Hyattsville, Maryland, U.S.
- Education: Virginia Military Institute (B.S.); National War College (M.S.); Florida Tech (M.S.)

Military service
- Allegiance: United States
- Branch/service: United States Army
- Years of service: 1985–2019
- Rank: Major general

Cedric Terry Wins is a retired United States Army major general. Wins was the last commander of RDECOM, in the U.S. Army Materiel Command, and the first commanding general (CG) of Combat Capabilities Development Command (DEVCOM), in the combat development element of U.S. Army Futures Command. In all, some 13,000 people work in some Science and Technology (S&T), or (RDT&E— research, development, test, and evaluation) capacity for DEVCOM.

Wins was the first Black superintendent of Virginia Military Institute (VMI), a position he held until February 2025 when the VMI Board of Visitors voted to not renew his contract.

== Education ==
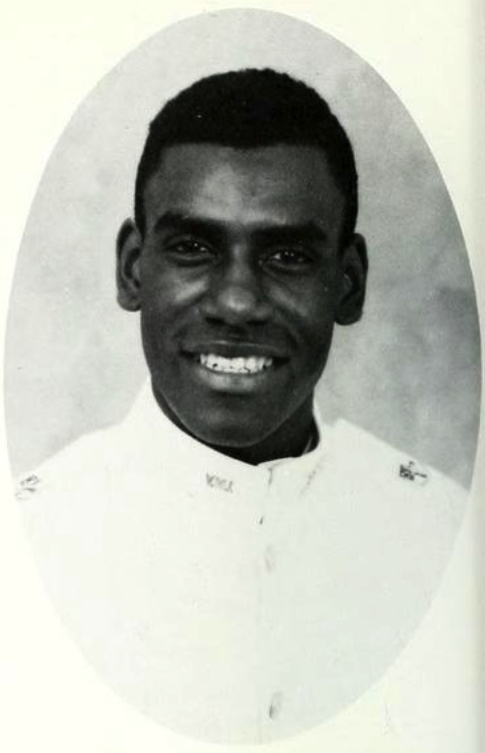
Wins in the 1985 VMI yearbook

Wins is a 1985 graduate of the Virginia Military Institute (VMI) with a bachelor's degree in economics. At VMI, he played on the basketball team. He was named to the Southern Conference All-Freshman team in 1982, and Second Team All Southern Conference in 1985. He finished his college career as one of the five top scorers in VMI history.

Wins was commissioned a Field Artillery officer in July 1985. After his Field Artillery Officer Basic and Advanced Courses, Wins continued with the U.S. Army Command and General Staff College. Wins earned an M.S. in national security and strategic studies from the National War College, and an M.S. in management from the Florida Institute of Technology.

== Assignments ==
Before his assignment as RDECOM commander, Wins served as Director, Force Development in the Office of the Deputy Chief of Staff, G-8. During his 30 years of service, Wins has held leadership and staff assignments in the 7th Infantry Division (Light), Office of the Deputy Chief of Staff, G-8. Additionally, Wins has been stationed at Fort Ord, California; the 2nd Infantry Division, Eighth United States Army, Korea; Headquarters Department of the Army and the Joint Staff, The Pentagon; the 4th Infantry Division, Fort Hood, Texas; Strategic Planning, J-8, U.S. Special Operations Command, MacDill Air Force Base, Florida; and the Requirement Integration Directorate, Army Capabilities Integration Center, Joint Base Langley-Eustis, Virginia.

His deployments include:

- Task Force Sinai, Multinational Force and Observers, Egypt
- Operations Officer, Headquarters and Headquarters Battery, 5th Battalion, 21st Infantry (Light)
- Program Executive Officer, Joint Program Executive Office – Afghanistan Public Protection Force
- Combined Security Transition Command – Afghanistan, Operation Enduring Freedom
- Deputy Commander, Police, North Atlantic Treaty Organization Training Mission – Afghanistan/Combined Security Transition Command – Afghanistan, Operation Enduring Freedom

Wins retired from the Army on November 6, 2019, after 34 years of service.

== Awards and decorations ==
His awards and badges include:

- Distinguished Service Medal
- Defense Superior Service Medal
- Legion of Merit (with One Oak Leaf Cluster)
- Bronze Star Medal
- Defense Meritorious Service Medal
- Meritorious Service Medal (with One Oak Leaf Cluster)
- Joint Service Commendation Medal
- Army Commendation Medal (with Two Oak Leaf Clusters)
- Joint Service Achievement Medal
- Army Achievement Medal (with One Oak Leaf Cluster)
- Parachutist Badge
- Joint Chiefs of Staff Identification Badge
- Army Staff Identification Badge

== Virginia Military Institute ==
On November 13, 2020, Wins was appointed interim superintendent of Virginia Military Institute (VMI), succeeding J. H. Binford Peay III, who resigned as superintendent. On April 15, 2021, the VMI Board of Visitors voted unanimously to appoint Wins as the Institute's 15th superintendent, the first African American to hold the position in the Institute’s 181-year old history. In February 2025, the board voted not to renew Wins’ contract but provided no reason for their decision. The board claimed that it was restricted from commenting due to employment laws.
