= Fred D. Robinson Jr. =

United States Army general

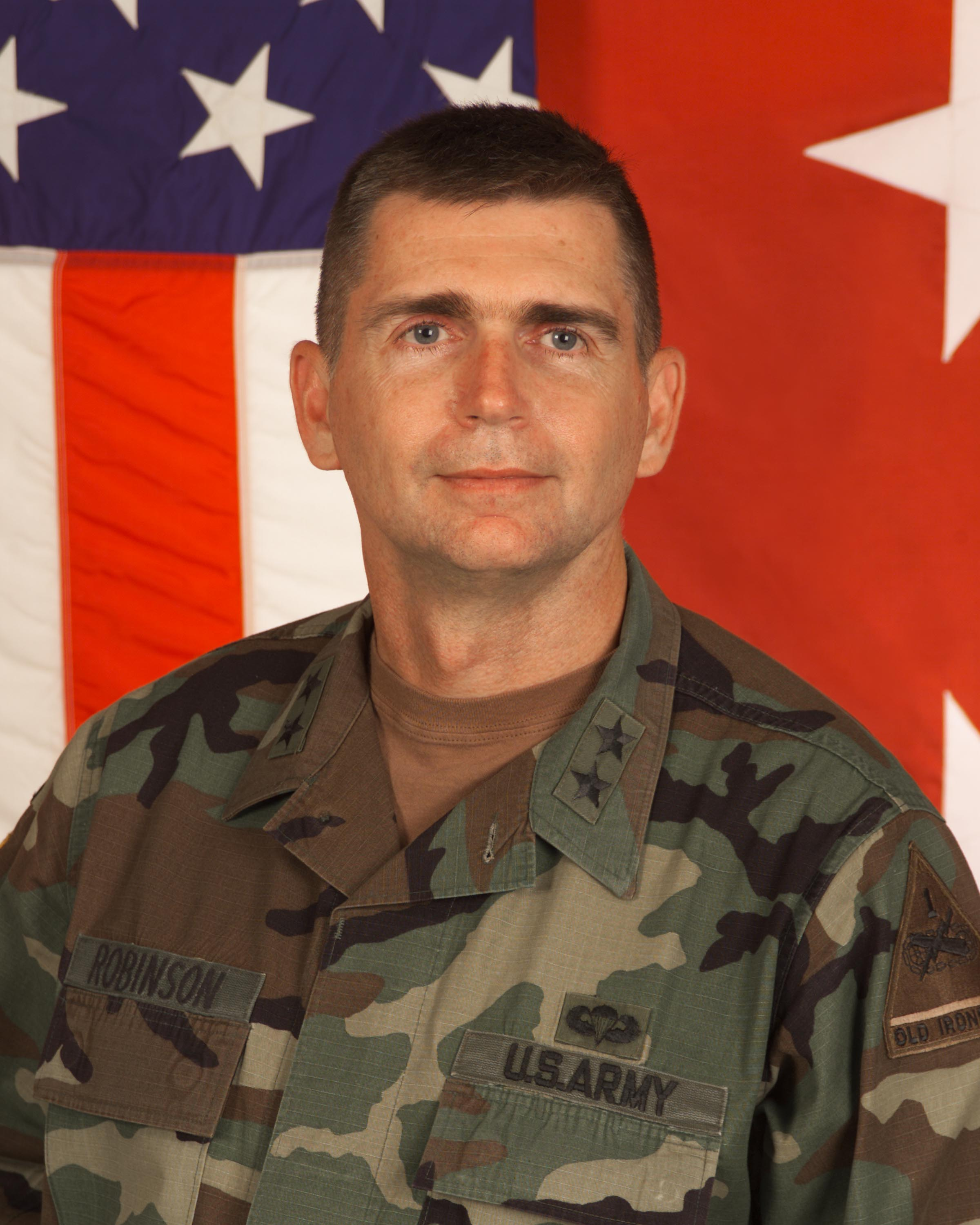
- Military career
- Allegiance: United States of America
- Branch/Service: United States Army
- Service years: 1976–2009
- Rank: Major general
- Commands: RDECOM; V Corps (interim); 1st Armored Division; ATEC
- Awards: Army Distinguished Service Medal; Defense Superior Service Medal; Legion of Merit with two oak leaf clusters; Bronze Star; Defense Meritorious Service Medal; Meritorious Service Medal with four oak leaf clusters; Army Commendation Medal with oak leaf cluster; National Defense Service Medal; Southwest Asia Service Medal; Kuwait Liberation Medal Saudi Arabia; Kuwait Liberation Medal Kuwait

Major General Fred "Doug" Robinson Jr. a native of Bolivar, Tennessee, was commissioned a second lieutenant in the United States Army from the University of Tennessee. As of 2007, he was commanding general of Army Research, Development and Engineering Command in the United States Army.

== Career ==
His first assignment was as a cavalry platoon leader with the Second Squadron, First Cavalry Regiment of the Second Armored Division, Fort Hood, Texas. His next assignment was as the A Troop executive officer and the support platoon leader of the squadron. Over the course of his career, his assignments have included commander, A Troop, 3rd Squadron, 7th Cavalry, 3rd Infantry Division, U.S. Army Europe; executive officer, 2nd Battalion, 69th Armor during Operations Desert Shield and Desert Storm; commander, 3rd Battalion, 64th Armor, 3rd Infantry Division, USAREUR; commander, 1st Brigade, 1st Infantry Division, Fort Riley, Kansas; deputy director for operations, National Military Command Center; commanding general, United States Army Test and Evaluation Command, Fort Hood, Texas; assistant division commander for maneuver, 1st Armored Division, director of operations, readiness and mobilization, Office of the deputy chief of staff, G3/5/7, commander, 1st Armored Division and commander, Research, Development and Engineering Command (RDECOM).

== Awards and decorations ==
Robinson's awards and decorations include:

- Parachutist Badge
- Joint Chiefs of Staff Identification Badge
- Army Staff Identification Badge.
- Army Distinguished Service Medal
- Defense Superior Service Medal
- Legion of Merit with two oak leaf clusters
- Bronze Star
- Defense Meritorious Service Medal
- Meritorious Service Medal with four oak leaf clusters
- Army Commendation Medal with oak leaf cluster
- National Defense Service Medal
- Southwest Asia Service Medal
- Kuwait Liberation Medal Saudi Arabia
- Kuwait Liberation Medal Kuwait

== Education ==
His military education includes the Armor Officer Basic and Advanced Courses; the Army Command and General Staff College, and the National War College. He has a bachelor's degree in mechanical engineering from the University of Tennessee; a master's degree in systems analysis from Memphis State University and National security and strategic studies from the National Defense University.
