= Hot Particulate Ingestion Rig =

Military test setup for testing gas turbine engine coatings

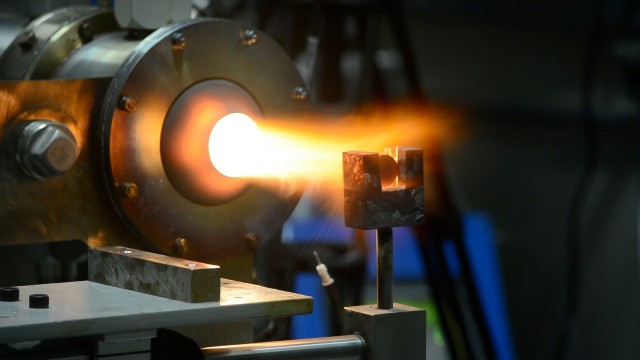
The Hot Particulate Ingestion Rig in operation

The Hot Particulate Ingestion Rig (HPIR) is a gas burner that can shoot sand into a hot gas flow and onto a target material to test how that material's thermal barrier coating is impacted by the molten sand. It was developed by the U.S. Army Research Laboratory (ARL) to experiment with new coating materials for gas turbine engines used in military aircraft.

== Mechanism ==
The HPIR uses standard military fuel and dry compressed air to produce combusted gas flows at temperatures that can range from 400 °C to 1,650 °C and travel up to 1,060 meters per second (Mach 0.8). A LabVIEW interface is used to monitor and control all the operations of the HPIR parameters and pneumatic table. Monitoring is also performed by Williamson PRO series single/dual wavelength pyrometers, S-type thermocouples, and a FLIR SC6700 mid-wave infrared (IR) camera in order to determine the emissivity of each sample.

Samples are placed in a steel holder in front of the rig at a 10-degree incident angle so that heats up the surface in a uniform manner. A pneumatic table moves the sample into the flame and an S-type thermocouple is used to monitor the flame's temperature. During testing, the sample is initially exposed to a hot gas flow at Mach 0.28 at a flame temperature of 815 °C until the pyrometer detects that the surface temperature of the target has reached 540 °C. Then, the sample goes through several cycles of heating and cooling as an initial survivability check before it can be exposed to even higher temperatures. Short-term durability testing consists of three of these cycles with the heating stage reaching engine-relevant temperatures and the cooling stage set at ambient conditions.

In 2016, the HPIR was modified to ingest sand and salt into the combustion chamber at 1 to 200 grams per minute.

== Sandphobic coating technology ==
In 2015, researchers at ARL were tasked with finding a way to prevent flying, micron-sized sand and dust particles from entering the gas turbine engines of military aircraft and damaging the internal machinery.

While modern engines have particle separators that can filter out large particles, fine, powder-like sand particles that are smaller than 100 micrometers in size have consistently managed to pass through the engine's combustors and attach to the blades and vanes. As the rotor blades experienced cycles of heating and cooling during operation, the particles melted due to the extreme temperatures and then subsequently hardened onto the turbine blades. As a result, the micron-sized sand particles have frequently destroyed the engine's internal coating, which has led to severe sand glazing, blade tip wear, calcia-magnesia-alumina-silicate (SMAS) attack, oxidation, plugged cooling holes, and, ultimately, engine loss. This problem has recently worsened due to the fact that more recent, state-of-the-art turbine engines operate at much higher temperatures than past generation turbomachinery, ranging from 1,400 °C to 1,500 °C.

According to ARL scientists, the damage caused by these tiny sand particles have reduced the lifespan of a typical T-700 engine from 6,000 hours to 400 hours, and replacing the rotors can cost more than $30,000. They estimate that one third of fielded engines used by the military have been affected by this sand ingestion problem.

As part of a collaborative research effort with the Aviation and Missile Research, Development, and Engineering Center (AMRDEC), the U.S. Navy Naval Air Systems Command (NAVAIR) and the National Aeronautics and Space Administration (NASA), ARL modified the HPIR so that it can model how sand particles adhere, melt, and glassify on thermal barrier coatings.

According to ARL researchers, the HPIR is the first system to confirm how the sand particles damage the turbine blades at temperatures similar to that of a turbine engine out on the field. Using high-speed imaging technology, ARL scientists were able to film how sand particles experience a phase change from solid to liquid before being deposited onto turbine blade material targets and vaporizing. In 2018, the team used the HPIR to test different coating materials and develop what they call “sandphobic coatings,” which will be designed so that the sand particles flake off the rotor blades instead of attaching to them.
