= United States Army Aviation and Missile Center =

Research center of the United States Army

Coordinates: 34°38′35″N 86°38′25″W

DEVCOM Aviation & Missile Center
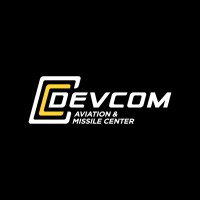
- DEVCOM AvMC logo
- Active: 1962–present
- Country: United States
- Branch: U.S. Army
- Type: Research and development
- Part of: U.S. Army Combat Capabilities Development Command
- Garrison/HQ: Redstone Arsenal, Alabama
- Website: www.avmc.army.mil avmc.devcom.army.mil

Commanders
- Director: James C. Kirsch

The U.S. Army DEVCOM Aviation and Missile Center (AvMC), (formerly known as the Aviation and Missile Research, Development and Engineering Center (AMRDEC)) is a mainly a civilian organization that provides research, development, and engineering services for the Army's aviation and missile platforms. DEVCOM AvMC is headquartered at Redstone Arsenal in Madison County, Alabama.

DEVCOM AvMC is part of the U.S. Army Combat Capabilities Development Command (DEVCOM). DEVCOM is under the U.S. Army Futures and Concepts Command, a component of the U.S. Army Transformation and Training Command.

== Locations ==
The DEVCOM Aviation and Missile Center is headquartered at Redstone Arsenal in Huntsville, Alabama. Other laboratories are located at Joint Base Langley-Eustis and Hampton, Virginia, as well as Moffett Field in California, where Army and NASA aviation facilities (such as instrumented test ranges and wind tunnels) are used. Personnel devoted to aviation sustainment and engineering are located in Corpus Christi, Texas, and serve as liaison engineers for global operations.

DEVCOM AvMC has over 1.9 million square feet of laboratory space that is used for: sensors and electronics, propulsion systems, aerodynamic structures, modeling and simulation, life cycle software development, and technical testing. DEVCOM AvMC employs approximately 12,000 civilian, military, and contractor personnel.

== History ==
DEVCOM AvMC traces its origins back to October 1948, when the Army's chief of ordnance designated Redstone Arsenal as the center for research and development in the field of rockets. A year later, the secretary of the Army approved the transfer of the Ordnance Research and Development Division sub-office (Rocket) from Fort Bliss, Texas, to the Redstone Arsenal in Alabama. Among those transferred were Dr. Wernher von Braun and his team of German scientists and technicians who had come to the United States after World War II. The Von Braun team is most noted for its pioneering efforts in helping the Army at Redstone lay the foundation for U.S. space exploration.

With the transfer of the Von Braun team to NASA in 1960, research and development activities by the Army at Redstone turned to incorporating space-age technology into weapons for the soldier in the field.

=== 2020s ===
Effective 19 January 2020, DEVCOM AvMC's directorates were reorganized:

- Technology Development Directorate (TDD): merged the Aviation Development Directorate with the Weapons Development and Integration Directorate.
- Systems Readiness Directorate (SRD): the Aviation Engineering Directorate and elements of the Engineering Directorate combined to form SRD.
- Software, Simulation, Systems Engineering and Integration (S3I) Directorate: was formerly the Systems Simulation, Software and Integration (S3I) Directorate. DEVCOM AvMC's prototype integration facility, along with certain elements under ED, were shifted to S3I.

=== Lineage ===
- 1962 – The U.S. Army Missile Command (MICOM) and the Directorate of Research and Development are activated.
- 1964 – U.S. Army Materiel Command assigned the Army Aviation Materiel Command its first aviation and surface research and development center in Fort Eustis, Virginia, to be known as the U.S. Army Aviation Materiel Laboratories. Later that year, the new U.S. Army Aeronautical Research Laboratory at NASA's Ames Research Center opened at Moffett Field, California. Both remain in operation today, under DEVCOM Aviation and Missile Center.
- 1965 – Redesignated the Research and Development Directorate.
- 1968 – Redesignated the Research and Engineering (R&E) Directorate.
- 1971 – Redesignated the Directorate for Research, Development, Engineering, and Missile Systems Laboratory (RDE&MSL).
- 1972 – RDE&MSL redesignated the Army Missile Research, Development, and Engineering Laboratory (MRDEL).
- 1977 – With the establishment of the U.S. Army Missile Research and Development Command (MIRADCOM), the Technology Laboratory and the Engineering Laboratory were activated.
- 1979 – MRDEL reorganized as the Army Missile Laboratory (AML), in the shift from the dual to merged command structure of the reinstituted MICOM. Also effective this date, the Engineering Laboratory was realigned and established as the Engineering Directorate.
- 1980 – Engineering Directorate functions were placed under AML.
- 1985 – Formation of the Research, Development and Engineering Centers (RDECs), in compliance with AMC directions to establish research, development, and engineering (RD&E) centers.
- 1992 – AVSCOM's RDEC realigned under the new Aviation and Troop Command (ATCOM).
- 1997 – The Aviation RDEC (AVRDEC) and Missile RDEC (MRDEC) assigned under the Aviation and Missile Command (AMCOM).
- 1999 / 2000 – The AMRDEC—Aviation and Missile Research, Development and Engineering Center—was formed by merging the AVRDEC and MRDEC.
- 2004 – AMRDEC assigned to the new Research, Development and Engineering Command (RDECOM).
- 2016 – AMRDEC operationally aligned under AMCOM; administratively aligned under RDECOM.
- 2018 – AMRDEC realigned administratively and operationally with RDECOM. Referred to as RDECOM Aviation and Missile Center.
- 2019 – RDECOM Aviation and Missile Center assigned under Army Futures Command, transferred from Army Materiel Command. Referred to as the Combat Capabilities Development Command Aviation and Missile Center (CCDC AvMC).
- 2021 – CCDC AvMC renamed DEVCOM AvMC. Higher headquarters, CCDC, referred to as DEVCOM.

== List of directors ==
No.	Director		Term		
No.	Portrait	Name	Took office	Left office	Duration
As U.S. Army Aviation and Missile Research, Development, and Engineering Center
-	James B. Lackey	James B. Lackey; Acting	January 2014	August 2014	~212 days
-	James B. Lackey	James B. Lackey	August 2014	19 January 2017	~2 years, 171 days
-	Jeffrey L. Langhout	Jeffrey L. Langhout; Acting	19 January 2017	26 November 2017	311 days
-	Juanita Christensen	Juanita Christensen	26 November 2017	February 2019	1 year, 67 days
As U.S. Army CCDC Aviation and Missile Center
-	Juanita Christensen	Juanita Christensen	February 2019	17 January 2021	1 year, 351 days
As U.S. Army DEVCOM Aviation and Missile Center
-	Jeffrey L. Langhout	Jeffrey L. Langhout	17 January 2021	26 April 2023	2 years, 99 days
-	James C. Kirsch	James C. Kirsch; Acting	26 April 2023	17 August 2023	113 days
-	James C. Kirsch	James C. Kirsch	17 August 2023	Incumbent	2 years, 275 days

== See also ==
- U.S. Army Aviation and Missile Command (AMCOM)
- Multi-Mission Launcher
