= J. H. Binford Peay III =

US Army general and college president

J.H. Binford Peay III
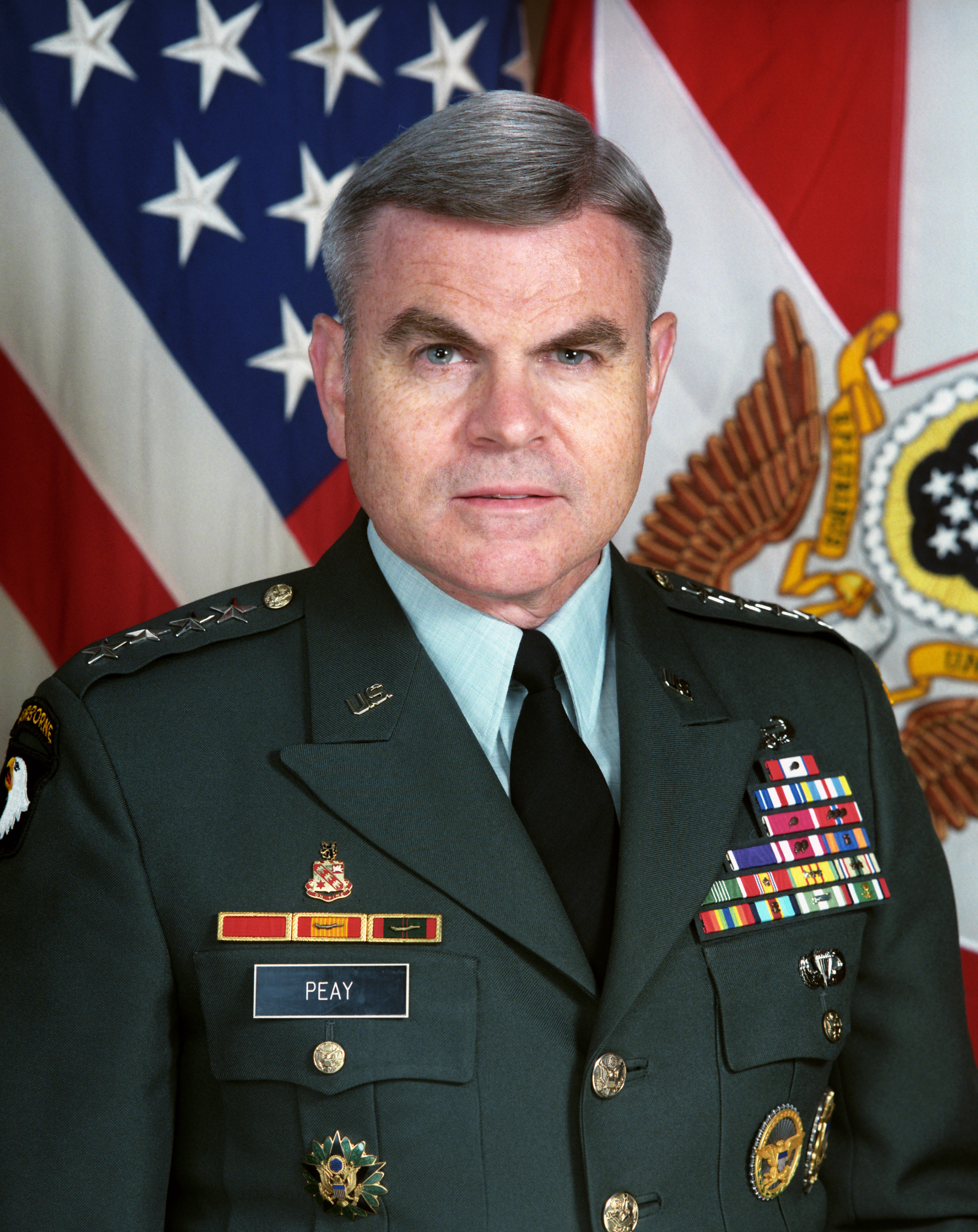
- General James Henry Binford Peay III
- Born: 10 May 1940 (age 86); Richmond, Virginia, U.S.
- Military career
- Allegiance: United States
- Branch: United States Army
- Service years: 1962–1997
- Rank: General
- Nickname: Binnie
- Commands: United States Central Command; Vice Chief of Staff of the United States Army; 101st Airborne Division; 2d Battalion, 11th Field Artillery Regiment
- Conflicts: Vietnam War; Gulf War
- Awards: Defense Distinguished Service Medal; Army Distinguished Service Medal (2); Silver Star; Defense Superior Service Medal; Legion of Merit (2); Bronze Star Medal (4); Purple Heart
- Other work: Superintendent, Virginia Military Institute; Chairman, Allied Defense Group; Director, BAE Systems Inc.

James Henry Binford "Binnie" Peay III (born 10 May 1940) is a retired four-star general of the United States Army. He served as the 14th superintendent of the Virginia Military Institute from 2003 to 2020, and as chairman of the Allied Defense Group from 2001 to 2003. He has also served on various corporate and nonprofit boards.

== Early life ==
Peay attained the rank of Eagle Scout in the Boy Scouts of America in 1954 and as an adult is a recipient of the Distinguished Eagle Scout Award. His father, Peay Jr. and both of his sons, Jim and Ryan, are also Eagle Scouts.

Peay graduated from the Virginia Military Institute in 1962 with a Bachelor of Science degree in Civil Engineering, where he was a quarterback on the football team and is an initiate of the Beta Commission of the Kappa Alpha Order; he was the first Kappa Alpha inducted into the Military Division when it was established in 2009. He also has a Master of Arts from George Washington University and graduated from the United States Army Command and General Staff College in June 1971 and the United States Army War College in June 1978.

== Military career ==
Peay was commissioned as a second lieutenant of Field Artillery in 1962. His initial troop assignments were in Germany and Fort Carson, Colorado. From December 1964 to September 1966, he served as aide-de-camp to the Commanding General, 5th Infantry Division. He went on to serve in other assignments, including two tours in the Republic of Vietnam. In his first tour, from May 1967 to July 1968, he commanded both Headquarters Company, I Field Force, Vietnam, and a firing battery (Battery B, 4th Battalion, 42nd Field Artillery Regiment) with the 4th Infantry Division in the Central Highlands. During his second tour from August 1971 to June 1972, he served as the assistant operations officer for the 3d Brigade, 1st Cavalry Division, and as operations officer for the same division's 1st Battalion, 21st Artillery Regiment.

After serving with the Army Military Personnel Center in Washington, D.C., as a Field Artillery branch assignments officer, Peay was sent to Hawaii in 1975 to command the 2d Battalion, 11th Field Artillery Regiment, 25th Infantry Division. Following completion of the Army War College, he returned to Washington, D.C., as Senior Aide to the Chairman of the Joint Chiefs of Staff, and later as Chief of the Army Initiatives Group in the Office of the Deputy Chief of Staff for Operation and Plans. He then moved to Fort Lewis, Washington, to serve as the I Corps' Assistant Chief of Staff, G-3/Director of Plans and Training, and later became the Division Artillery (DIVARTY) Commander, of the 9th Infantry Division. In 1985, he returned to Washington, D.C., as Executive to the Chief of Staff of the United States Army. He first became a "Screaming Eagle" in July 1987, when he became the Assistant Division Commander (Operations), 101st Airborne Division (Air Assault) at Fort Campbell, Kentucky. Beginning in July 1988, he served a one-year assignment as Deputy Commandant, Command and General Staff College, Fort Leavenworth, Kansas.

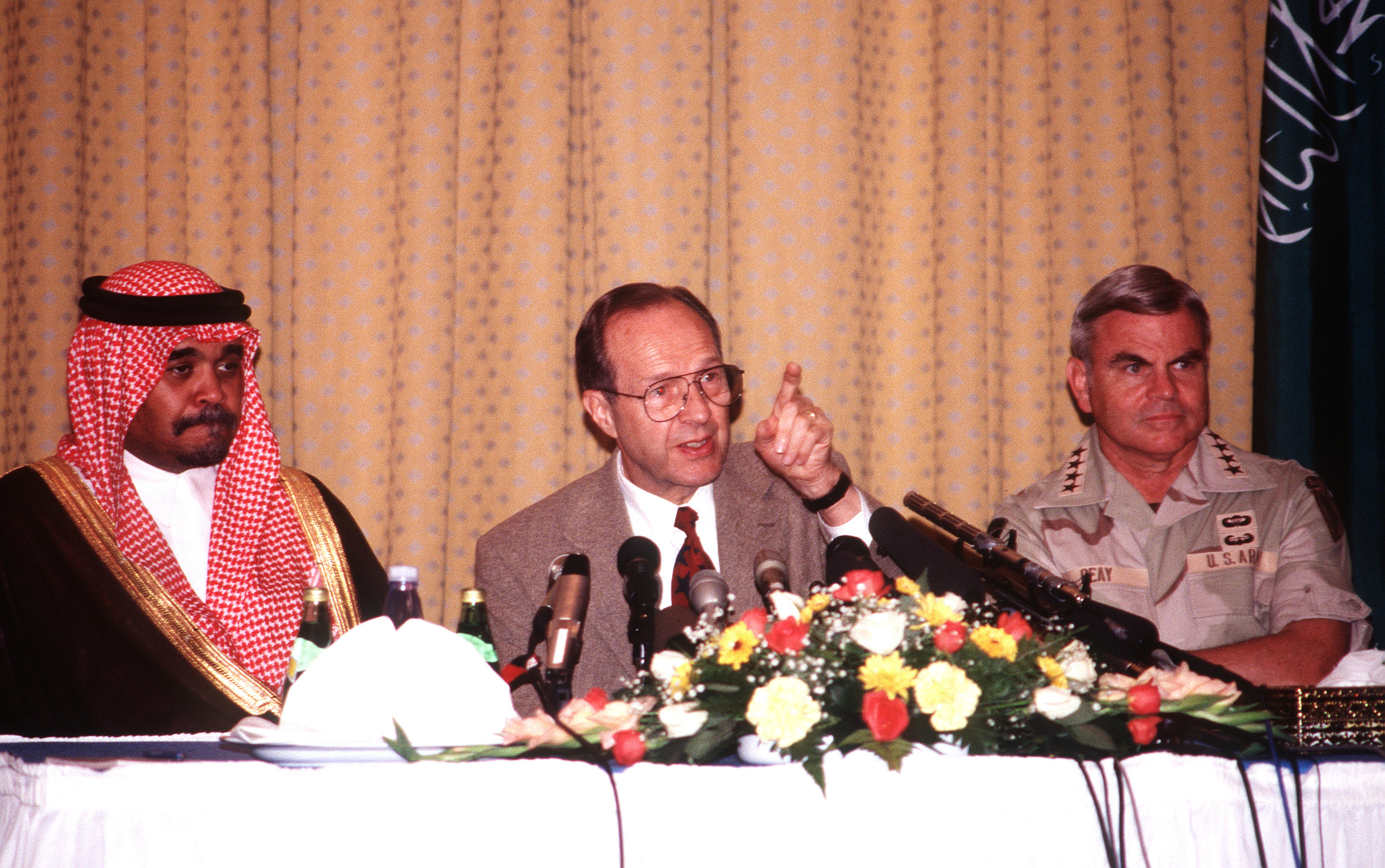
Peay with Secretary of Defense William J. Perry, 1996.

On 3 August 1989, Peay returned to Fort Campbell to assume command of the 101st Airborne Division and led the division through Operations Desert Shield and Desert Storm in the Persian Gulf. Promoted to the rank of lieutenant general, he was the army's Deputy Chief of Staff for Operations and Plans, and Senior Army Member, United States Military Committee from June 1991 until March 1993. He was promoted to general on March 26, 1993, and appointed as the twenty-fourth Vice Chief of Staff of the United States Army. His last active duty position was as Commanding General, United States Central Command, at MacDill Air Force Base, Florida, from 5 August 1994 until 13 August 1997.

Peay's awards and decorations include the Defense Distinguished Service Medal, the Army Distinguished Service Medal with oak leaf cluster, the Silver Star, the Defense Superior Service Medal, the Legion of Merit with oak leaf cluster, the Bronze Star Medal with three oak leaf clusters, and the Purple Heart. He has also received the Meritorious Service Medal with two oak leaf clusters, several Air Medals, and the Army Commendation Medal. Additionally, he wore the Parachutist Badge, Ranger Tab, the Air Assault Badge, the Secretary of Defense Identification Badge, Joint Chiefs of Staff Identification Badge, and the Army General Staff Identification Badge.

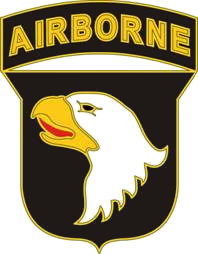

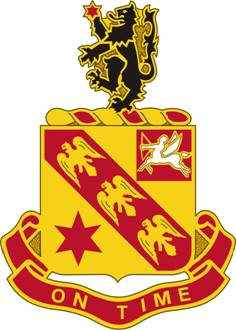

== Career after retirement ==
After retirement from the Army, Peay became a director at United Defense Industries (UDI) in 1997. In 2005 BAE Systems purchased UDI and appointed Peay to the board of its North American subsidiary, BAE Systems Inc. He joined Allied Research Corporation in March 2000 as member of its board of directors. In January 2001, he was made chairman, president and CEO. In 2003, the company was renamed Allied Defense Group.

== Virginia Military Institute ==
Peay resigned in June 2003 to assume the position of Superintendent of his alma mater, Virginia Military Institute (VMI). He was inducted into Omicron Delta Kappa as an alumnus at VMI in 2010.

Peay resigned as Superintendent of VMI on 26 October 2020 after being told that state leaders had lost confidence in his leadership amid claims of ongoing structural racism at VMI. He left the institute on 28 October 2020.

In 2022, Peay was honored by VMI with the New Market Medal, VMI's highest honor.

Military offices
Preceded by Dennis Reimer	Vice Chief of Staff of the United States Army; 1993–1994	Succeeded by John H. Tilelli, Jr.
Preceded by Joseph P. Hoar	Commander-in-Chief of United States Central Command; 1994–1997	Succeeded by Anthony Zinni
Academic offices
Preceded by Josiah Bunting III	Superintendent of the Virginia Military Institute; 2003–2020	Succeeded by Cedric T. Wins
