= The Research and Analysis Center =

Agency of the United States Army

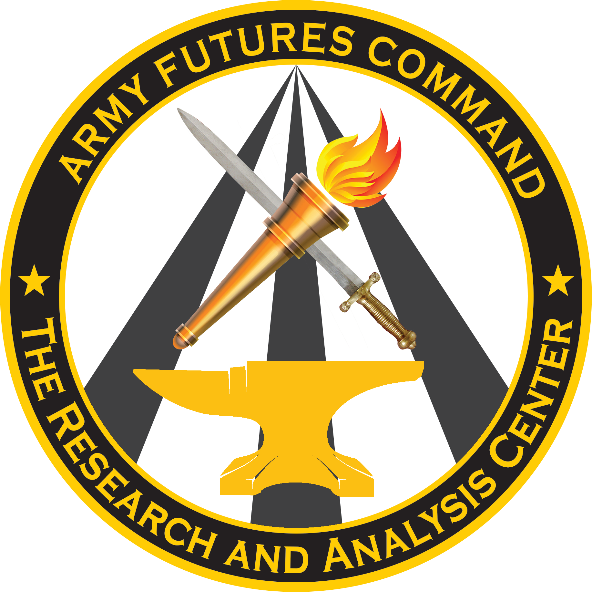
The Research and Analysis Center

The Research and Analysis Center (TRAC), formerly the TRADOC Analysis Center, was an analysis agency of the United States Army. TRAC was tasked to conduct research on potential military operations worldwide to inform decisions about the most challenging issues facing the Army and the Department of Defense (DoD). TRAC relied upon the intellectual capital of a highly skilled workforce of military and civilian personnel to execute its mission.

TRAC conducted operations research (OR) on a wide range of military topics, some contemporary but most often set five to 15 years in the future. TRAC directly supported the mission of the Army Futures Command (AFC), to develop future concepts and requirements while also serving the decision needs of many military clients.

The DEVCOM Analysis Center (DAC) and The Research Analysis Center (TRAC) have transitioned together to a new organization called the Transformation Decision Analysis Center (TDAC) operating under the United States Army Futures and Concepts Command.

== Mission statement ==
To produce relevant and credible operations analysis to inform decisions.

== Organization ==
TRAC was led by a civilian SES director, subordinate to the Commanding General of the US Army Futures Command. It comprised four centers:

- TRAC-Fort Leavenworth (TRAC-FLVN), led by a civilian SES director, was co-located with TRAC headquarters at Fort Leavenworth, Kansas and traditionally conducted analysis at the operational (Corps and division) level.
- TRAC-White Sands Missile Range (TRAC-WSMR), led by a civilian SES director, was located at White Sands Missile Range in New Mexico and traditionally conducted analysis at the tactical Brigade and below level.
- TRAC-Fort Gregg-Adams (TRAC-FGAV), led by a lieutenant colonel, was co-located with the Combined Arms Support Command (CASCOM) located at Fort Gregg-Adams, VA and traditionally conducted analysis in the area of Sustainment, which included Logistics and other support functions such as medical and personnel.
- TRAC-Monterey, also led by a lieutenant colonel, was co-located with the Naval Postgraduate School (NPS) in Monterey, CA and traditionally utilized the resources of NPS to conduct research into new models and methodologies.

Each center director was subordinate to the TRAC director.

=== Program ===
The TRAC program of operations research and analysis was forward-looking and addresses a wide range of military topics. The analysis was conducted within a joint framework of combined arms operations across a full spectrum of missions and environments. TRAC led major studies of new warfighting operations and organization (O&O) concepts and requirements, and Acquisition Category (ACAT) I and special interest ACAT II and II and Analysis of Alternatives (AoA) in line with the JCIDS process. Research topics spanned doctrine, training, leader development, organization, materiel, and soldier support (DOTMLPF).

Director, TRAC was the Army Futures Command executive agent for developing scenarios for use in studies and analysis. TRAC developed scenarios of potential military operations set in the future for use in modeling and analysis.
