= Nick Justice =

United States Army general

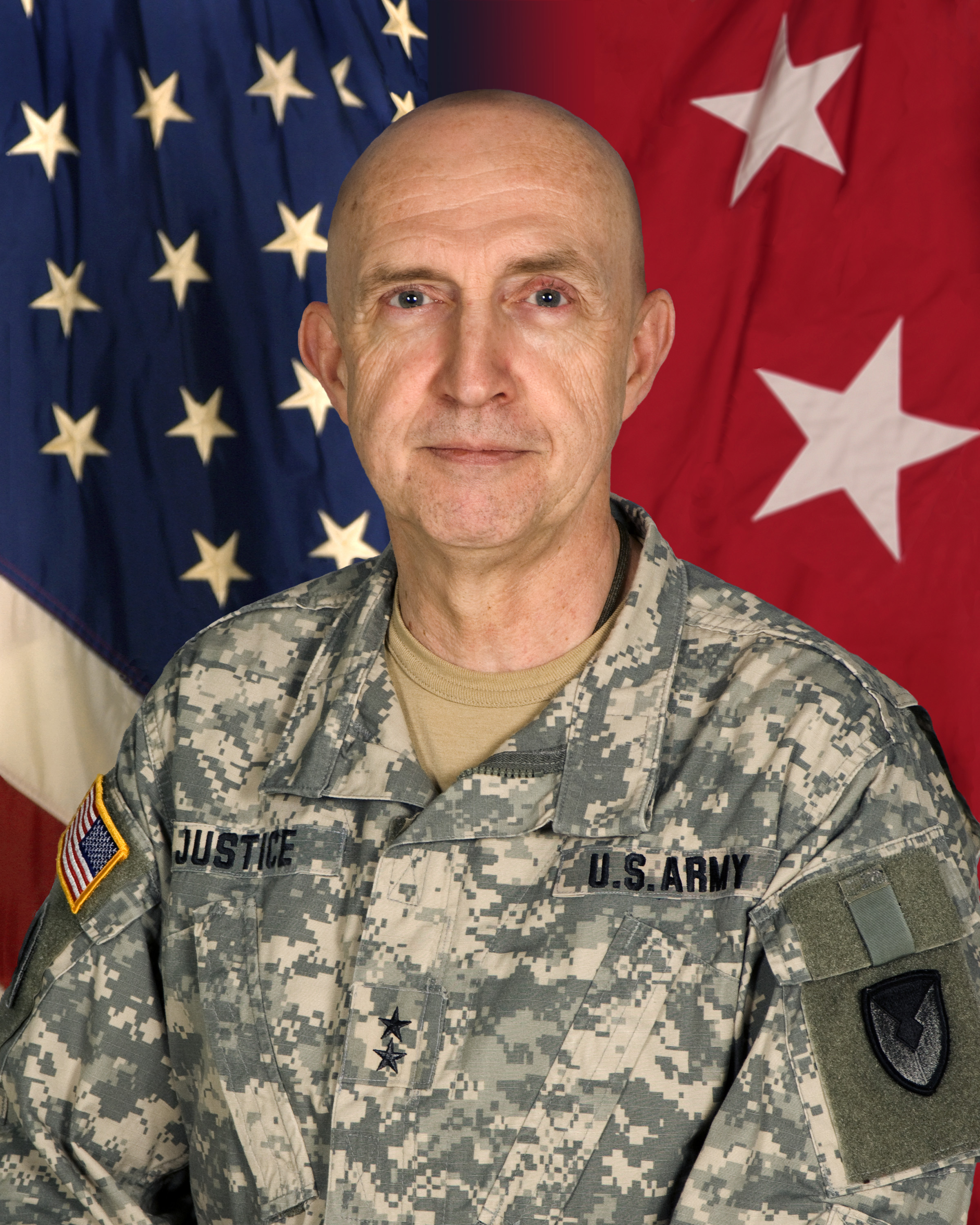
- Maj. Gen. Nick Justice, USA
- Born: Nickolas G. Justice
- Military career
- Allegiance: United States
- Branch: United States Army
- Service years: 1970–2012
- Rank: Major General
- Awards: Legion of Merit (3); Bronze Star Medal; Defense Meritorious Service Medal; Meritorious Service Medal (4); Army Commendation Medal (2)

Nickolas G. "Nick" Justice is a U.S. Army major general who commanded the United States Army Research, Development and Engineering Command and Aberdeen Proving Ground, Maryland.

He assumed command of RDECOM on December 4, 2009. He left RDECOM February 10, 2012, and retired from the Army in October.

== Biography ==
Justice began his 42-year army career as an enlisted soldier. He was commissioned upon graduation from Officer Candidate School in 1977.

He earned a bachelor's degree in history from the University of Maryland, a master's degree in Institutional Management from Pepperdine University and a master's degree in International Relations from Salve Regina College. His military education includes the Industrial College of the Armed Forces, the Senior Acquisition Course of the Armed Forces, the Adjutant General Basic and Advanced Course, Systems Automation Course, and the United States Naval War College.

Prior to serving as RDECOM commanding general, Justice was the Program Executive Officer for the Program Executive Office Command, Control and Communications-Tactical at Fort Monmouth, New Jersey.

His experiences include significant joint service and acquisition assignments. His joint service experience includes a two-year assignment to the Sixth Allied Tactical Air Force as Chief, Project Management for Command and Control Systems. During this assignment, he participated in Operation Desert Storm as part of the North Atlantic Treaty Organization. During Operation Iraqi Freedom, he served as Commander of the Information Management Task Force in Kuwait and Iraq.

His 20 years of acquisition experience includes assignments as Project Manager, Transportation Coordinator's Automated Information for Movement Systems and Project Manager, Force XXI Battle Command Brigade and Below (PM FBCB2). As the PM FBCB2, Justice fielded 1,100 battlefield-tested systems to soldiers deployed in Operation Iraqi Freedom and Operation Enduring Freedom.

Justice received the 2002 Army Acquisition Excellence PM of the Year Award. He won Federal Computer Weekly's Federal 100 Award in 2004 and 2008, as well as its Monticello Award in 2004. He was awarded the 2008 Armed Forces Communications and Electronics Association Award of Excellence in Information Technology. In August 2010, he was named the Association of Defense Communities Military Leader of the Year.

== Other achievements ==
Justice's awards and decorations include the Legion of Merit with two oak leaf clusters, the Bronze Star Medal, the Defense Meritorious Service Medal, the Meritorious Service Medal with three oak leaf clusters, the Army Commendation medal with an oak leaf cluster, the Army Achievement Medal, and the Army Staff Identification Badge. He was inducted into the 2009 Officer Candidate School Hall of Fame on March 27 in Fort Benning, Georgia.

Government offices
Preceded by Major General Paul S. Izzo	Commanding General, United States Army Research, Development and Engineering Command; 2009–present	Unknown
