= Kenneth W. Hunzeker =

United States Army general

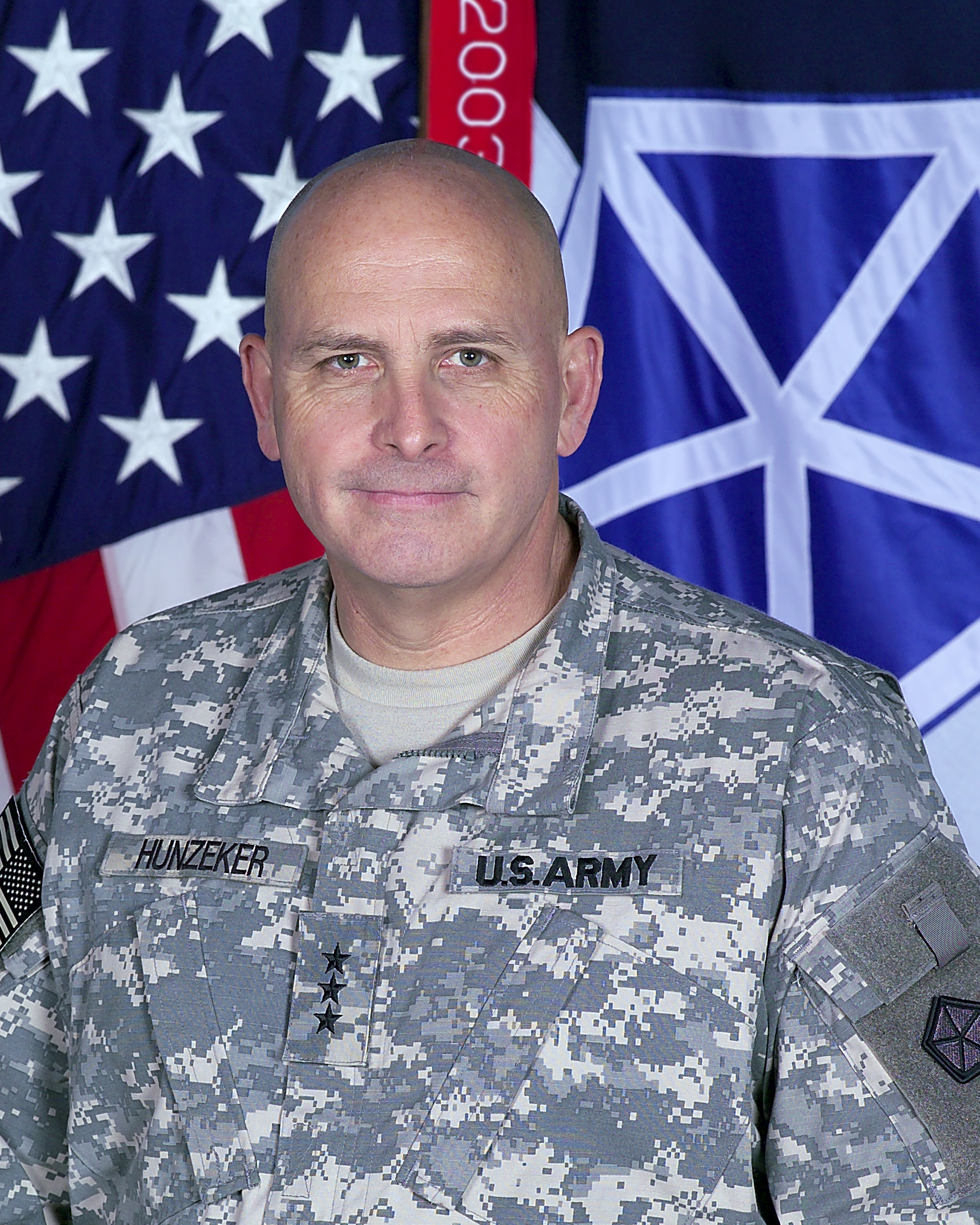
- Born: August 26, 1952 (age 73); Pittsburgh, Pennsylvania, US
- Allegiance: United States
- Branch: United States Army
- Service years: 1971–1975 (enlisted); 1975–2010 (39 years)
- Rank: Lieutenant General
- Awards: Defense Distinguished Service Medal; Distinguished Service Medal (OLC); Bronze Star Medal
- Other work: CEO and President of Vectrus, Inc.

Kenneth W. Hunzeker (born 1952, Pittsburgh, Pennsylvania) is a retired officer in the United States Army who attained the rank of lieutenant general. He was commissioned from the United States Military Academy (USMA), West Point, New York, in 1975. He retired from active service in 2010, after 35 years.

== Biography ==
Hunzeker was born in Pittsburgh, Pennsylvania, on August 26, 1952. He entered the USMA in July 1971 from the USMA Preparatory School in Fort Belvoir, Virginia, as an enlisted soldier. He graduated West Point as a second lieutenant in the Field Artillery branch in 1975 and served as a forward observer, a fire direction officer, a battery executive officer and a brigade fire support officer. Following attendance at the Field Artillery Advanced Course at Fort Sill, he commanded at the battery level and also served as a battalion operations officer. Hunzeker commanded a field artillery battalion at Fort Sill, Oklahoma, followed by a posting as divisional artillery commander in charge of a brigade-sized artillery element in Germany.

Hunzeker served in the Army Personnel Command as an operations research systems analyst from 1985 to 1988. He was later assigned to the Army's Program Analysis and Evaluation directorate (2001), and in 2003 as the vice director of the Joint Staff agency responsible for Force Structure development (J-8).

He was promoted to brigadier general, in January 2002. After serving as the assistant division commander of the 4th Infantry Division and in a senior military staff position based in Washington, D.C., Hunzeker was promoted to major general in 2005 and commanded the 1st Infantry Division in Germany. While there, he oversaw the return of the division back to Fort Riley, Kansas, its longtime home. After a year in command of the division, Hunzeker became commanding officer for the Operation Iraqi Freedom Civilian Police Assistance Training team in Iraq, which provided oversight and guidance for more than 400,000 Iraqi police force personnel throughout the country.

In his final two assignments and after being promoted to lieutenant general in 2007, Hunzeker first commanded the U.S. Fifth Corps in Germany, and then served as the deputy commander of all U.S. forces in Iraq – the position he held when he retired.

== Post-military employment ==
After retirement from the military, in September 2010, Hunzeker joined ITT Corporation as the vice president of government relations for ITT Defense and Information Solutions. In April 2011, he was appointed the president of Exelis Mission Systems, a business division of the ITT Corporation spin-off, Exelis. He was subsequently appointed as the chief executive officer and president of Vectrus, Inc., in September 2014, when the company spun out from the former parent, Exelis. Hunzeker retired from Vectrus in December 2016. He served briefly as a member of the board of directors for the Professional Services Council in 2015 and 2016.

== Awards and decorations ==
During his career in the Army, Hunzeker received the following awards and decorations:

right-side wear

left-side wear

Joint Meritorious Unit Award with 2 Oak leaf clusters
Army Staff Identification Badge

Parachutist Badge
	Defense Distinguished Service Medal	Army Distinguished Service Medal with Oak leaf cluster	
Defense Superior Service Medal	Legion of Merit with 2 Oak leaf clusters	Bronze Star Medal	Defense Meritorious Service Medal
Meritorious Service Medal with 3 Oak leaf clusters	Joint Service Commendation Medal	Army Commendation Medal	Army Achievement Medal with Oak leaf cluster
Army Good Conduct Medal	National Defense Service Medal with 1 service star	Iraq Campaign Medal with 1 Campaign star	Global War on Terrorism Service Medal
Armed Forces Service Medal	Army Service Ribbon	Army Overseas Service Ribbon with bronze award numeral "4"	NATO Medal
Joint Staff Identification Badge

== Education ==
Hunzeker holds a bachelor's degree from the U.S. Military Academy at West Point and two master's degrees, one in Systems Technology (Command, Control and Communications) from the Naval Post Graduate School, at Monterey, California, and one in Strategic Security Studies from the National Defense University, at Fort Lesley J. McNair, Washington, DC.

== Personal life ==
Hunzeker comes from a military family. His grandfather served in World War II, while his father, a career logistician in the Army, was commissioned during the Korean War and commanded a battalion during the Vietnam War, later attaining the rank of major general. He was a member of the U.S. Army Quartermaster Hall of Fame. Hunzeker and his wife, Patti, were married in June 1977. They have four daughters and thirteen grandchildren.
