= Distinguished Service Medal (U.S. Army) =

United States Army military decoration

U.S. Army Distinguished Service Medal
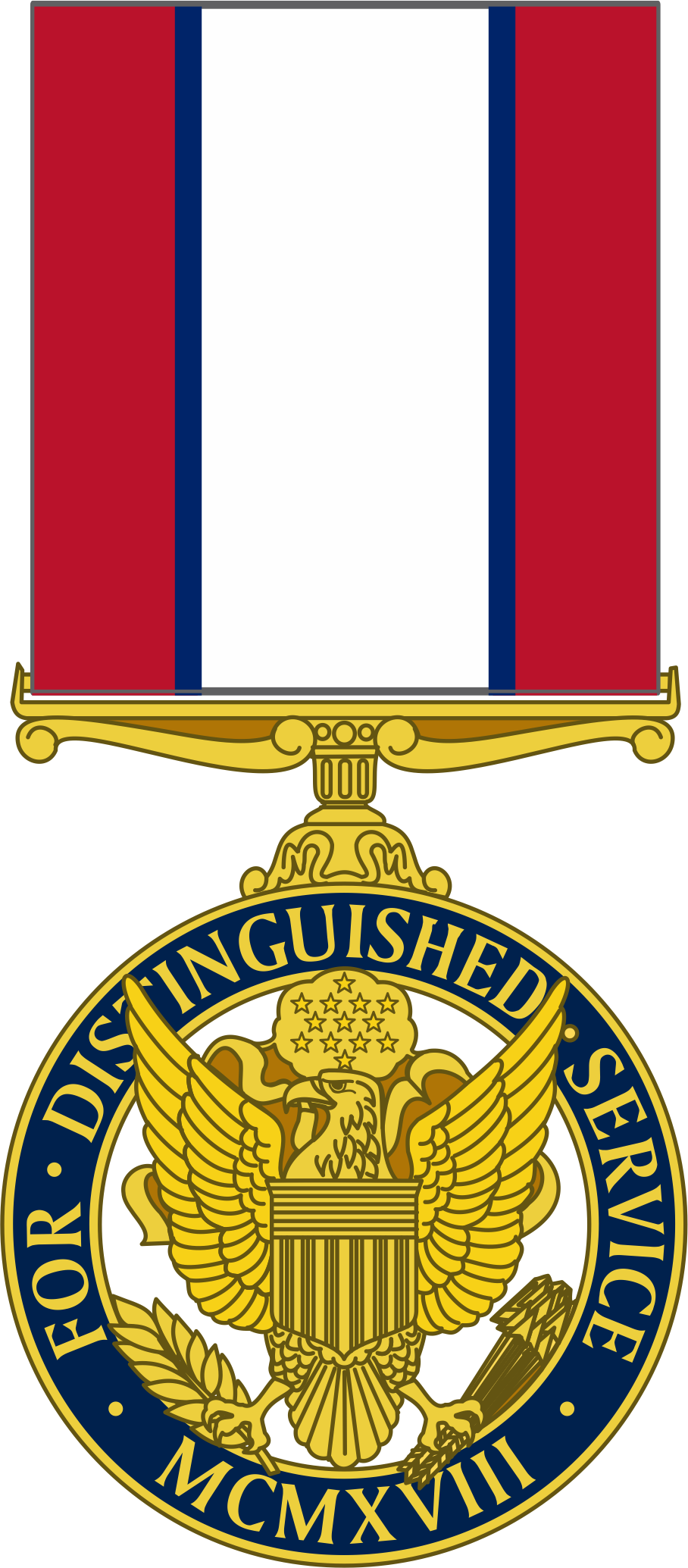
- Type: Military medal Distinguished service medal
- Awarded for: Distinguished themself by exceptionally meritorious service to the Government in a duty of great responsibility.
- Presented by: United States Department of the Army
- Eligibility: United States Army soldiers
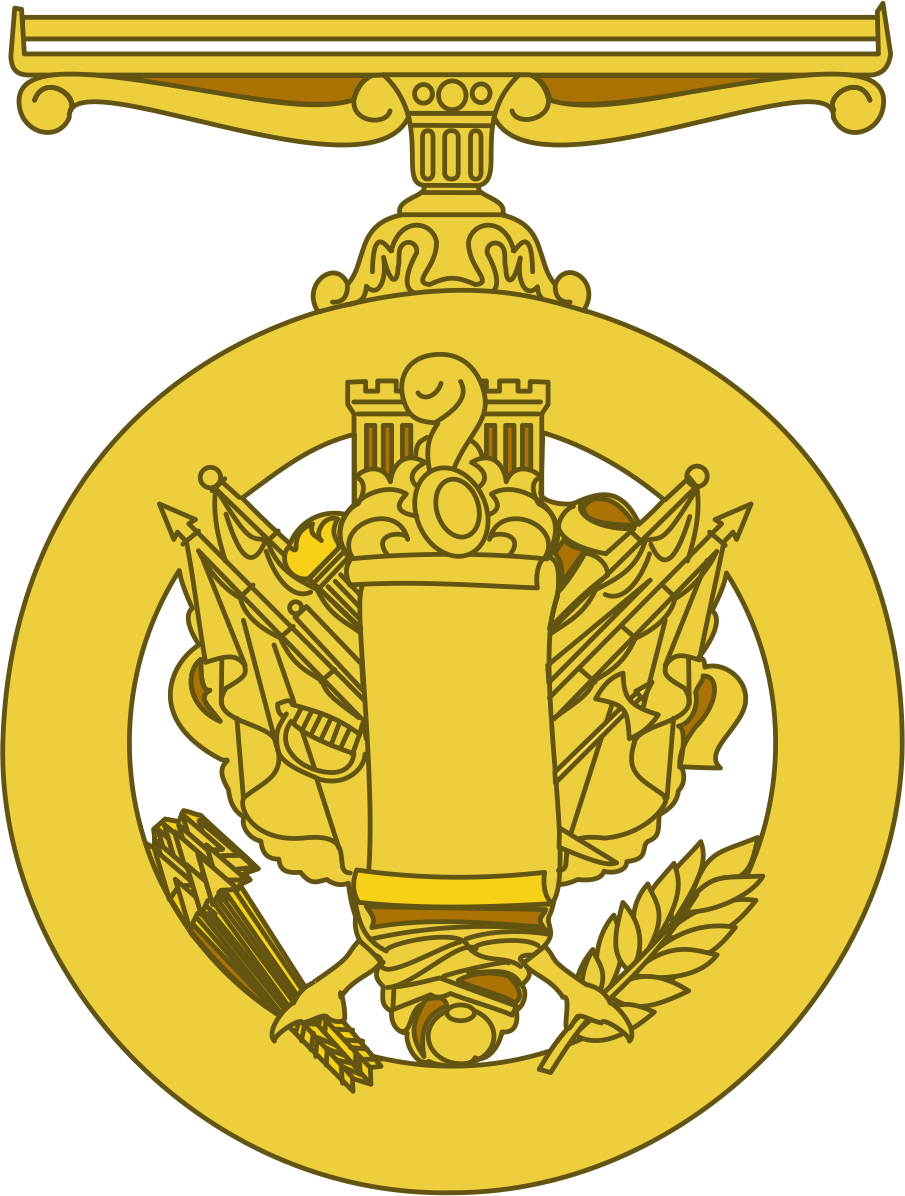
- Reverse
- Status: Currently awarded
- Established: January 2, 1918
- First award: January 12, 1918
- Service ribbon

Precedence
- Next (higher): Department of Defense: Defense Distinguished Service Medal; Department of Homeland Security: Homeland Security Distinguished Service Medal
- Equivalent: Naval Service: Navy Distinguished Service Medal; Air and Space Forces: Air Force Distinguished Service Medal; Coast Guard: Coast Guard Distinguished Service Medal
- Next (lower): Silver Star Medal

The Distinguished Service Medal (DSM) is a military decoration of the United States Army that is presented to soldiers who have distinguished themselves by exceptionally meritorious service to the government in a duty of great responsibility. The performance must be such as to merit recognition for service that is clearly exceptional. The exceptional performance of normal duty will not alone justify an award of this decoration.

The Army's Distinguished Service Medal is equivalent to the Naval Service's Navy Distinguished Service Medal, Air and Space Forces' Distinguished Service Medal, and the Coast Guard Distinguished Service Medal. Prior to the creation of the Air Force's Distinguished Service Medal in 1960, United States Air Force airmen were awarded the Army's Distinguished Service Medal.

== Description ==
- The coat of arms of the United States in Gold surrounded by a circle of Dark Blue enamel, 1 ½ inches in diameter, bearing the inscription "FOR DISTINGUISHED SERVICE MCMXVIII".
- On the reverse is a scroll for the name of the recipient (which is to be engraved) upon a trophy of flags and weapons. The medal is suspended by a bar attached to the ribbon.

=== Ribbon ===
- The ribbon is 1 3/8 inches (35 mm) wide and consists of the following stripes:
1. 5/16 inch (7.9 mm) Scarlet 67111;
2. 1/16 inch (1.6 mm) Ultramarine Blue 67118;
3. 5/8 inch (16 mm) White 67101;
4. 1/16 inch (1.6 mm) Ultramarine Blue;
5. 5/16 inch (7.9 mm) Scarlet.
- Additional awards of the Distinguished Service Medal are denoted by oak leaf clusters.

== Criteria ==
The Distinguished Service Medal is awarded to any person—but effectively only to general officers—who, while serving in any capacity with the United States Army, has distinguished themselves by exceptionally meritorious service to the Government in a duty of great responsibility.

The performance must be such as to merit recognition for service which is clearly exceptional. Exceptional performance of normal duty will not alone justify an award of this decoration. For service not related to actual war, the term "duty of a great responsibility" applies to a narrower range of positions than in time of war and requires evidence of a conspicuously significant achievement. However, justification of the award may accrue by virtue of exceptionally meritorious service in a succession of high positions of great importance. Awards may be made to persons other than members of the Armed Forces of the United States for wartime services only, and only then under exceptional circumstances with the express approval of the president in each case.

== Components ==
- The following are authorized components of the Distinguished Service Medal and applicable specifications:
1. Decoration (regular size): MIL-D-3943/7.
  1. NSN for decoration set: 8455-00-444-0007.
  2. NSN for replacement medal is 8455-00-246-3830.
2. Decoration (miniature size): MIL-D-3943/7. NSN 8455-00-996-5008.
3. Ribbon: MIL-R-11589/52. NSN 8455-00-252-9922.
4. Lapel Button (metal replica of ribbon bar): MIL-L-11484/4. NSN 8455-00-253-0809.

== History of the Distinguished Service Medal ==
The Distinguished Service Medal was authorized by Presidential Order dated January 2, 1918, and confirmed by Congress on July 9, 1918. It was announced by War Department General Order No. 6, 1918-01-12, with the following information concerning the medal: "A bronze medal of appropriate design and a ribbon to be worn in lieu thereof, to be awarded by the President to any person who, while serving in any capacity with the Army shall hereafter distinguish himself or herself, or who, since 04-06-1917, has distinguished himself or herself by exceptionally meritorious service to the Government in a duty of great responsibility in time of war or in connection with military operations against an armed enemy of the United States." The Act of Congress on July 9, 1918, recognized the need for different types and degrees of heroism and meritorious service and included such provisions for award criteria. The current statutory authorization for the Distinguished Service Medal is Title 10, United States Code, Section 3743.

== Recipients ==
- Among the first awards of the Distinguished Service Medal for service in World War I, were those to the Commanding Officers of the Allied Armies:
1. Marshal Ferdinand Foch
2. Marshal Joseph Joffre
3. General Philippe Petain of France
4. General Louis Franchet d'Espèrey of France
5. General Sir Arthur Currie of Canada
6. General Sir John Monash of Australia
7. Field Marshal Douglas Haig, 1st Earl Haig of Britain
8. General Armando Diaz of Italy
9. General Cyriaque Gillain of Belgium
10. General John Joseph Pershing of the United States
11. Field Marshal Živojin Mišić of Serbia

More than 2,000 awards were made during World War I, and by the time the United States entered World War II, approximately 2,800 awards had been made. From July 1, 1941, to June 6, 1969, when the Department of the Army stopped publishing awards of the DSM in Department of the Army General Orders, over 2,800 further awards were made.

Prior to World War II the DSM was the only decoration for non-combat service in the U.S. Army. As a result, before World War II the DSM was awarded to a wider range of recipients than during and after World War II. During World War I awards of the DSM to officers below the rank of brigadier general were fairly common but became rare once the Legion of Merit was established in 1942.

Until the first award of the Air Force Distinguished Service Medal in 1965, United States Air Force personnel received this award as well, as was the case with several other Department of the Army decorations until the Department of the Air Force fully established its own system of decorations.

=== Notable recipients ===
Because the Army Distinguished Service Medal is principally awarded to general officers, a list of notable recipients would include nearly every general, and some admirals, since 1918, many of whom received multiple awards, as well as a few civilians and sergeants major prominent for their contributions to national defense.

General Martin Dempsey, former chairman of the Joint Chiefs of Staff, holds the record for receiving the greatest number of awards of the Army Distinguished Service Medal, at six. He also received three awards of the Defense Distinguished Service Medal as well as one award each of the Navy Distinguished Service Medal, the Air Force Distinguished Service Medal, and the Coast Guard Distinguished Service Medal, for a total of twelve Distinguished Service Medals.

Generals of the Army Douglas MacArthur and Dwight Eisenhower are tied with five awards each received of the Army Distinguished Service Medal. They also each received one award of the Navy Distinguished Service Medal, for a total of six DSMs each.

General Lucius D. Clay (Four Star) received three Army DSM awards for his service that included Commanding General, U.S. Army Forces (European Theater) and Military Governor of Germany. During his tenure, Gen. Clay solved his greatest challenge: the Soviet Blockade of Berlin, which was imposed in June 1948. Gen. Clay triggered the Berlin Airlift, which served the city residents during the harsh winter of 1948–1949. He is also a recipient of the Legion of Merit.

General Norman Schwarzkopf received two awards of the Army DSM and one award each of the Defense DSM, Navy DSM, the Air Force DSM and the Coast Guard DSM, for a total of six DSMs.

General Lloyd Austin received four awards of the Army DSM and five awards of the Defense DSM for a total of nine DSMs.

Among notable recipients below flag rank are: X-1 test pilot Chuck Yeager and X-15 test pilot Robert M. White, who both received the DSM as U.S. Air Force majors; director Frank Capra, decorated in 1945 as an army colonel; actor James Stewart, decorated in 1945 as an Army Air Forces colonel (later Air Force Brigadier General); Colonel Wendell Fertig, who led Filipino guerrillas behind Japanese lines; Colonel (later Major General) John K. Singlaub, who led partisan forces in the Korean War; and Major Maude C. Davison, who led the "Angels of Bataan and Corregidor" during their imprisonment by the Japanese, and Colonel William S. Taylor, Program Manager Multiple Launch Rocket System. Among notable civilian recipients are Harry L. Hopkins, Robert S. McNamara and Henry L. Stimson.

Samuel W. Koster received a DSM, but this was rescinded due to his involvement in covering up the My Lai massacre

Notable American and foreign recipients include:

=== United States Army ===
- General of the Armies John J. Pershing – Commander of the American Expeditionary Forces
- General of the Army George C. Marshall – US Army Chief of Staff (two awards)
- General of the Army Douglas MacArthur – Supreme Commander for the Allied Powers (five awards)
- General of the Army Dwight D. Eisenhower – NATO Supreme Allied Commander Europe (five awards)
- General of the Army Omar N. Bradley – Chairman of the Joint Chiefs of Staff (four awards)
- General John Abizaid – Commander US Central Command
- General Creighton Abrams – US Army Chief of Staff (five awards)
- General Lloyd Austin – Commander US Central Command (four awards)
- General Julius W. Becton Jr. – African American combat veteran of the Korean and Vietnam wars.
- General J. H. Binford Peay III – Commander US Central Command (two awards)
- General Tasker H. Bliss – US Army Chief of Staff
- General George W. Casey Jr. – US Army Chief of Staff (two awards)
- General Richard E. Cavazos - Commander United States Army Forces Command (FORSCOM) (two awards)
- General Peter W. Chiarelli – US Army Vice Chief of Staff
- General Mark W. Clark – Commander of the United Nations Command (four awards)
- General Lucius D. Clay – Commanding General European Theater and Military Governor of Germany (three awards)
- General J. Lawton Collins – US Army Chief of Staff (four awards)
- General Bantz J. Craddock – Commander US European Command
- General Malin Craig – US Army Chief of Staff (three awards)
- General Martin E. Dempsey – Chairman of the Joint Chiefs of Staff (six awards)
- General Oliver W. Dillard – African American infantry officer and combat veteran of the Korean and Vietnam wars (two awards)
- General Ann E. Dunwoody – First female US Army four-star general United States Army Materiel Command (two awards)
- General John W. Foss – Commander Training and Doctrine Command (three awards)
- General Tommy Franks – Commander US Central Command (two awards)
- General John Galvin – NATO Supreme Allied Commander Europe
- General Alfred Gruenther – NATO Supreme Allied Commander Europe (four awards)
- General Alexander Haig – NATO Supreme Allied Commander Europe
- General Carter Ham – Commander of United States Africa Command
- General John J. Hennessey – Commander United States Readiness Command
- General John L. Hines – US Army Chief of Staff
- General Harold K. Johnson – US Army Chief of Staff (two awards)
- General George Joulwan – NATO Supreme Allied Commander Europe
- General Lyman L. Lemnitzer – NATO Supreme Allied Commander Europe (four awards)
- General Peyton C. March – US Army Chief of Staff
- General Edward C. Meyer – US Army Chief of Staff
- General Mark Milley – Chairman of the Joint Chiefs of Staff (four awards)
- General Lauris Norstad – NATO Supreme Allied Commander Europe
- General George S. Patton – Commander US 3rd Army (three awards)
- General David Petraeus – Commander International Security Assistance Force (three awards)
- General Colin Powell – Chairman of the Joint Chiefs of Staff (two awards)
- General Dennis Reimer – US Army Chief of Staff
- General Matthew B. Ridgeway – US Army Chief of Staff (four awards)
- General Bernard W. Rogers – NATO Supreme Allied Commander Europe
- General Peter Schoomaker – US Army Chief of Staff (three awards)
- General Norman Schwarzkopf – Commander of Operation Desert Storm (three awards)
- General John Shalikashvili – Chairman of the Joint Chiefs of Staff
- General Hugh Shelton – Chairman of the Joint Chiefs of Staff (three awards)
- General Eric Shinseki – US Army Chief of Staff (two awards)
- General Joseph Stilwell – Commander of the China Burma India Theater
- General Maxwell D. Taylor – US Army Chief of Staff
- General James Van Fleet – Commander US 8th Army in Korea
- General Jonathan M. Wainwright – Commander Allied Forces Philippines
- General Walton Walker – Commander US 8th Army in Korea (two awards)
- General William Westmoreland – US Army Chief of Staff (four awards)
- General Earle G. Wheeler – Chairman of the Joint Chiefs of Staff (two awards)
- Lieutenant General A.C. Roper – Vice Commander, U.S. Element, North American Aerospace Defense Command and Deputy Commander, U.S. Northern Command
- Lieutenant General John B. Coulter (three awards)
- Lieutenant General Harris W. Hollis – Commanding General, 9th and 25th Infantry Divisions in South Vietnam
- Lieutenant General Henry E. Emerson – Commander XVIII Airborne Corps
- Lieutenant General Charles Flynn – 25th Infantry Division
- Lieutenant General Mark P. Hertling – Commanding General of US Army Europe
- Lieutenant General Kenneth W. Hunzeker
- Lieutenant General John C. H. Lee – Commanding General Army Service Forces Europe WWII
- Lieutenant General Hunter Liggett
- Lieutenant General Edward J. O'Neill – with 1 bronze oak leaf cluster in lieu of subsequent award of medal
- Lieutenant General Ricardo Sanchez – Commanding General V Corps (two awards)
- Lieutenant General Eric Schoomaker – 42nd Surgeon General of the United States Army
- Lieutenant General William Wilson Quinn – Chevalier of the French Legion of Honor
- Lieutenant General Thomas S. Vandal – Commander of the 2nd Infantry Division, Eighth Army
- Lieutenant General Nadja West – 44th Surgeon General of the United States Army
- Major General Gladeon M. Barnes – Chief of Research and Engineering
- Major General Chester V. Clifton – Military Aide to Presidents Kennedy and Johnson
- Major General William E. Cole – Commander 351st Field Artillery 1917–18
- Major General William J. Donovan – founder of the Office of Strategic Services
- Major General James L. Dozier – deputy chief of staff at NATO's Southern European land forces
- Major General Lawrence J. Fuller – deputy director of the Defense Intelligence Agency
- Major General Charles M. Gettys – commanding general, 23rd Infantry Division
- Major General George W. Goethals – engineer of the Panama Canal
- Major General William C. Gorgas – Surgeon General of the Army
- Major General Patrick J. Hurley
- Major General Lloyd E. Jones
- Major General Edward Mann Lewis
- Major General Henry Balding Lewis
- Major General Robert McGowan Littlejohn
- Major General Viet Xuan Luong – United States Army, Japan
- Major General Franklin Lane McKean - Commander 96th ARCOM, Fort Douglas
- Major General Charles R. Miller
- Major General Mason M. Patrick
- Major General Lowell Ward Rooks - Commander of the 90th Infantry Division
- Major General Maurice Rose – commanding general 3rd Armored Division
- Major General John K. Singlaub
- Major General Charles F. Thompson
- Major General Darren L. Werner - Commanding General Tank, Automotive and armament Command
- Major General Arthur R. Wilson
- Major General Cedric T. Wins
- Brigadier General Sherwood Cheney – chief of the Army Transport Service during World War I
- Brigadier General Charles G. Dawes – Vice President of the United States
- Brigadier General Anna Mae Hays – chief of the United States Army Nurse Corps and first female US Army general
- Brigadier General Frank T. Hines – director of the Veterans Administration
- Brigadier General Howard Knox Ramey
- Brigadier General Frank Merrill
- Brigadier General Greg Parker
- Brigadier General Russell W. Volckmann
- Colonel Frank Capra – movie director (received as a colonel, Army of the United States in WWII)
- Colonel Bailey Ashford - medical officer
- Colonel Laurie Buckhout – political candidate and business executive
- Colonel Harvey Williams Cushing – neurosurgeon
- Colonel Horatio B. Hackett – Assistant administrator of the Public Works Administration; noted architect and businessman; football official and player
- Colonel Oveta Culp Hobby – director of the Women's Army Corps during World War II
- Colonel Herbert H. Lehman – Governor of New York and United States Senator
- Colonel Floyd James Thompson – The longest-held prisoner of war in American history
- Lieutenant Colonel Clarence O. Sherrill
- Major David A. Reed – U.S. Senator for Pennsylvania, 1922, for service as a major in World War I
- Major Forsyth Wickes – socialite, philanthropist and collector
- Chaplain Francis P. Duffy – chaplain of the "Fighting 69th"
- Major Herbert O. Yardley – cryptologist
- Sergeant Major of the Army Daniel A. Dailey
- Command Sergeant Major Adam Nash
- Command Sergeant Major John P. McDwyer
- Sergeant First Class Kyle F. Salone Jr.

=== United States Navy ===
- Fleet Admiral Chester W. Nimitz – Chief of Naval Operations
- Fleet Admiral William F. Halsey – Commander of the 3rd Fleet
- Admiral William S. Benson - Chief of Naval Operations
- Admiral William J. Crowe, Jr. – Chairman of the Joint Chiefs of Staff
- Admiral William Fechteler - Chief of Naval Operations
- Admiral Albert Gleaves - Commander of the Asiatic Fleet
- Admiral Jonathan Greenert - Chief of Naval Operations
- Admiral Thomas C. Kinkaid - Commander Sixteenth Fleet
- Admiral William V. Pratt - Chief of Naval Operations
- Admiral U. S. Grant Sharp Jr. - Commander US Pacific Command
- Admiral Raymond A. Spruance – Commander of the 5th Fleet (later Ambassador to the Philippines)
- Admiral Harold Rainsford Stark - Chief of Naval Operations
- Admiral Carlisle Trost – Chief of Naval Operations
- Admiral Henry B. Wilson - Commander of the Atlantic Fleet
- Vice Admiral Robert L. Ghormley
- Vice Admiral Henry Kent Hewitt (with oak leaf cluster)
- Rear Admiral Hilary P. Jones
- Rear Admiral Charles P. Plunkett

=== United States Marine Corps ===
- General Paul X. Kelley
- General Vernon E. Megee,
- General Peter Pace – Chairman of the Joint Chiefs of Staff
- Major General Graves B. Erskine
- Major General Smedley Butler
- Major General John A. Lejeune

=== United States Air Force ===
Note – includes Army Air Service, Army Air Corps and Army Air Forces

- General of the Air Force Hap Arnold – commander of the Army Air Forces
- General Jimmy Doolittle
- General Edwin W. Rawlings
- General Joseph McNarney
- General Hoyt S. Vandenberg – Air Force Chief of Staff and Director of Central Intelligence
- General George C. Kenney
- General Curtis Lemay – Air Force Chief of Staff
- General Carl Spaatz – Air Force Chief of Staff
- General Michael E. Ryan
- Lieutenant General Claire Lee Chennault (with oak leaf cluster) – Leader of the Flying Tigers
- Major General Billy Mitchell, USAAC – Military air power prophet
- Brigadier General Chuck Yeager – Legendary test pilot
- Colonel Bernt Balchen, USAF – Legendary Norwegian-American pilot and arctic explorer.
- Captain John Birch, USAAF – Missionary, guerilla leader and namesake of the John Birch Society
- Brigadier General Darr H. Alkire

=== Civilians ===
- Grace Banker – Chief telephone operator of mobile for the American Expeditionary Forces
- Bernard Baruch – Chairman, War Industries Board, 1918
- Evangeline Booth – General of the Salvation Army
- James F. Byrnes - Secretary of State during World War II
- Jacqueline Cochran – Aviator and founder of the Women Airforce Service Pilots (WASPs)
- Henry Pomeroy Davison – Director of the American Red Cross
- Jane Delano – Founder of the American Red Cross Nursing Service
- James Forrestal – Secretary of Defense
- Hugh Frayne – chairman, labor division of the War Industries Board
- Harry Augustus Garfield – U.S. Fuel Administrator
- Harry Hopkins – Presidential aide to Franklin Roosevelt.
- Edward N. Hurley – Chairman, American Shipping Board
- Robert McNamara – Secretary of Defense
- Edwin B. Parker – Member of the War Industries Board and arbiter with Germany, Austria and Hungary following World War I
- Hannah J. Patterson – Resident director of the Women's Committee of the Council of National Defense
- Anna Howard Shaw – Head of the Women's Committee of the Council of National Defense
- Edward R. Stettinius – Director general of purchases for the War Department
- John F. Stevens – Engineer of the Panama Canal and the Great Northern Railway
- Henry L. Stimson – Secretary of War
- Maude Cleveland (Woodworth) – Chief of the home communication and casualty service, Red Cross, at Brest, France

=== Foreigners ===
- Edmund Allenby, 1st Viscount Allenby, General (later Field Marshal), British Army
- HM Albert I, King of Belgians
- Alan Brooke, 1st Viscount Alanbrooke, field marshal, British Army
- Pietro Badoglio, general, Italian Army
- William Birdwood, 1st Baron Birdwood, general, British Indian Army (during secondment to Australian Army, later promoted to Field Marshal)
- Julian Byng, 1st Viscount Byng of Vimy, General (later Field Marshal), British Army
- Sir Winston Churchill KG, OM, PC, CH, FRS – British Minister of Munitions (later Prime Minister)
- Harry Crerar, lieutenant general, Canadian Army
- Andrew Cunningham, 1st Viscount Cunningham of Hyndhope, Admiral of the Fleet, Royal Navy
- Sir Arthur Currie, lieutenant general, British Army, commanding Canadian Corps
- Georges de Bazelaire, major general, VII Army Corps of the French Army during World War I
- Sir Francis de Guingand, major general, British Army
- Jean de Lattre de Tassigny, general, French Army (later a Marshal of France)
- Sir Miles Dempsey, general, British Army
- Sir John Dill, field marshal, British Army
- Ferdinand Foch, Marshal of France, French Army
- Douglas Haig, 1st Earl Haig, field marshal, British Army
- Arthur T. Harris, air chief marshal, Royal Air Force (later a Marshal of the Royal Air Force)
- Chiang Kai-shek, general, Chinese Army
- Mariano Goybet, general, French Army
- Charles Mangin, general, French Army
- Paul Maistre, general, French Army
- Sir Richard McCreery, general, British Army
- Lord Alfred Milner, British Secretary of State for War
- Živojin Mišić, field marshal, Serbian Army
- Sir John Monash, general, Australian Army
- Bernard Montgomery, 1st Viscount Montgomery of Alamein, field marshal, British Army
- Sir Frederick E. Morgan, lieutenant general, British Army
- Louis Mountbatten, 1st Earl Mountbatten of Burma, admiral, Royal Navy (later Admiral of the Fleet)
- Henri Petain, Marshal of France, French Army
- Alexander Pokryshkin, Marshal of the Soviet Air Force
- Charles Portal, 1st Viscount Portal of Hungerford, Marshal of the Royal Air Force
- Sir William Robertson, 1st Baronet, field marshal, British Army
- Frederick Sykes, Chief of the Air Staff (United Kingdom)
- Tanaka Giichi, general, Imperial Japanese Army
- Arthur Tedder, 1st Baron Tedder, air chief marshal, Royal Air Force (later Marshal of the Royal Air Force)
- Sir Henry Worth Thornton, major general, British Army (American-born)
- Gerald Trotter, brigadier-general, British Army
- Sir Thomas Montgomery-Cuninghame, 10th Baronet of Corsehill, brevet lieutenant colonel, military attache, British Army
- Uehara Yūsaku, field marshal, Imperial Japanese Army
- Maxime Weygand, general, French Army
- Harold St. John Loyd Winterbotham, British

== See also ==
- Awards and decorations of the United States military
- Awards and decorations of the United States Army
- Air Force Distinguished Service Medal
- Coast and Geodetic Survey Distinguished Service Medal
- Merchant Marine Distinguished Service Medal
- Navy Distinguished Service Medal
