= United States Army Combat Capabilities Development Command =

U.S. Army's provider of nearly all R&D services

Coordinates: 39.473451°N 76.140837°W

Combat Capabilities Development Command
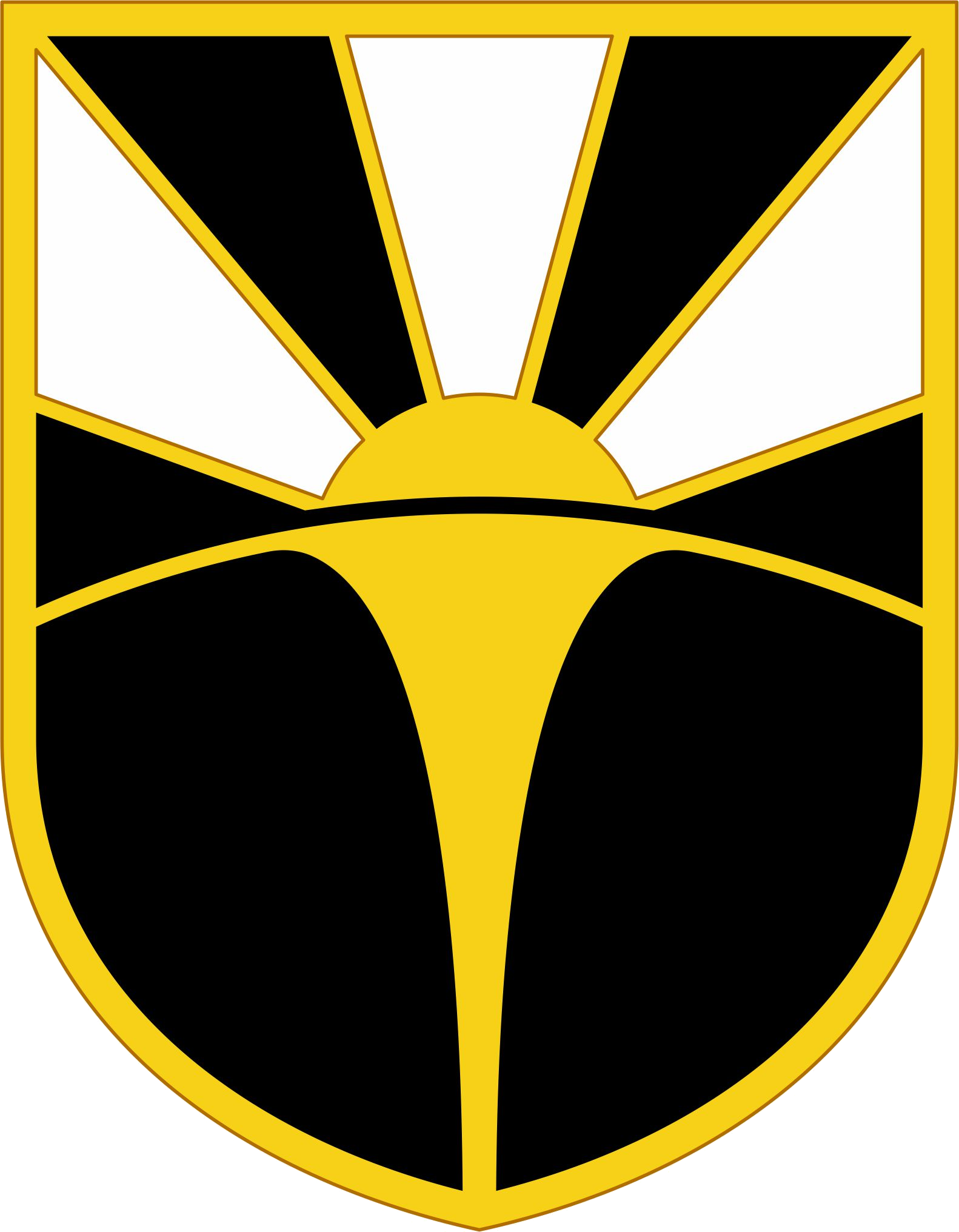
- DEVCOM distinctive unit insignia Logo
- Active: 1 October 2002 – present
- Country: United States
- Branch: United States Army
- Type: Command
- Role: Research and development
- Part of: U.S. Army Futures and Concepts Command
- Garrison/HQ: Aberdeen Proving Ground, Maryland
- Mottos: DEVCOM: Pro Futuro (Latin) ("Fight for the Future") RDECOM: Cum Scientia Commutare (Latin) ("Through Science We Change")
- Website: Official website army.mil Profile

Commanders
- Current commander: BG Robert G. Born
- First commander: MG Cedric T. Wins

Insignia
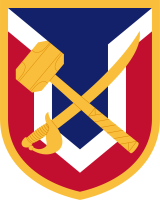
- Shoulder sleeve insignia of U.S. Army Futures and Concepts Command, worn by DEVCOM service members

The U.S. Army Combat Capabilities Development Command (DEVCOM) is a command that provides research and development for the U.S. Army. Headquartered at Aberdeen Proving Ground, Maryland, DEVCOM is a component of the U.S. Army Futures and Concepts Command under the U.S. Army Transformation and Training Command.

In 2002, the U.S. Army Research, Development and Engineering Command (RDECOM) was established, aiming to consolidate the research and development laboratories of the U.S. Army Materiel Command. Following the establishment of U.S. Army Futures Command (AFC), RDECOM was renamed as U.S. Army Combat Capabilities Development Command (CCDC) upon its transfer to AFC. Then-CCDC rebranded to DEVCOM in 2021.

== Role and organization ==
DEVCOM conducts and sponsors scientific research in areas important to the Army, develops scientific discoveries into new technologies, then engineers said technology into new equipment and capabilities, while working with the U.S. Army Transformation and Training Command to help requirements writers define the future needs of the Army.

DEVCOM is headquartered at Aberdeen Proving Ground. Before 1 November 2019, Major General Cedric T. Wins was the commanding general, assisted by Brigadier General Vincent F. Malone as deputy commanding general and Command Sergeant Major Jon R. Stanley as command sergeant major. They oversaw one laboratory and six major centers:

- DEVCOM Armaments Center (DEVCOM AC)
- DEVCOM Army Research Laboratory (DEVCOM ARL)
- DEVCOM Aviation and Missile Center (DEVCOM AvMC)
- DEVCOM C5ISR Center (DEVCOM C5ISR Center)
- DEVCOM Chemical Biological Center (DEVCOM CBC)
- DEVCOM Ground Vehicle System Center (DEVCOM GVSC)
- DEVCOM Soldier Center (DEVCOM SC)

== History ==
After assuming command of the U.S. Army Materiel Command (AMC) in October 2001, General Paul J. Kern saw the need to streamline how the Army developed technology. At the time, the Army's laboratories and research centers reported through multiple channels, among other problems. Kern argued that the Army had to "figure out how to get technology in the hands of the Warfighters quicker", and that it was "the impression of everyone out there that the laboratories take too long, they do science for science's sake, (and) engineering for engineering's sake".

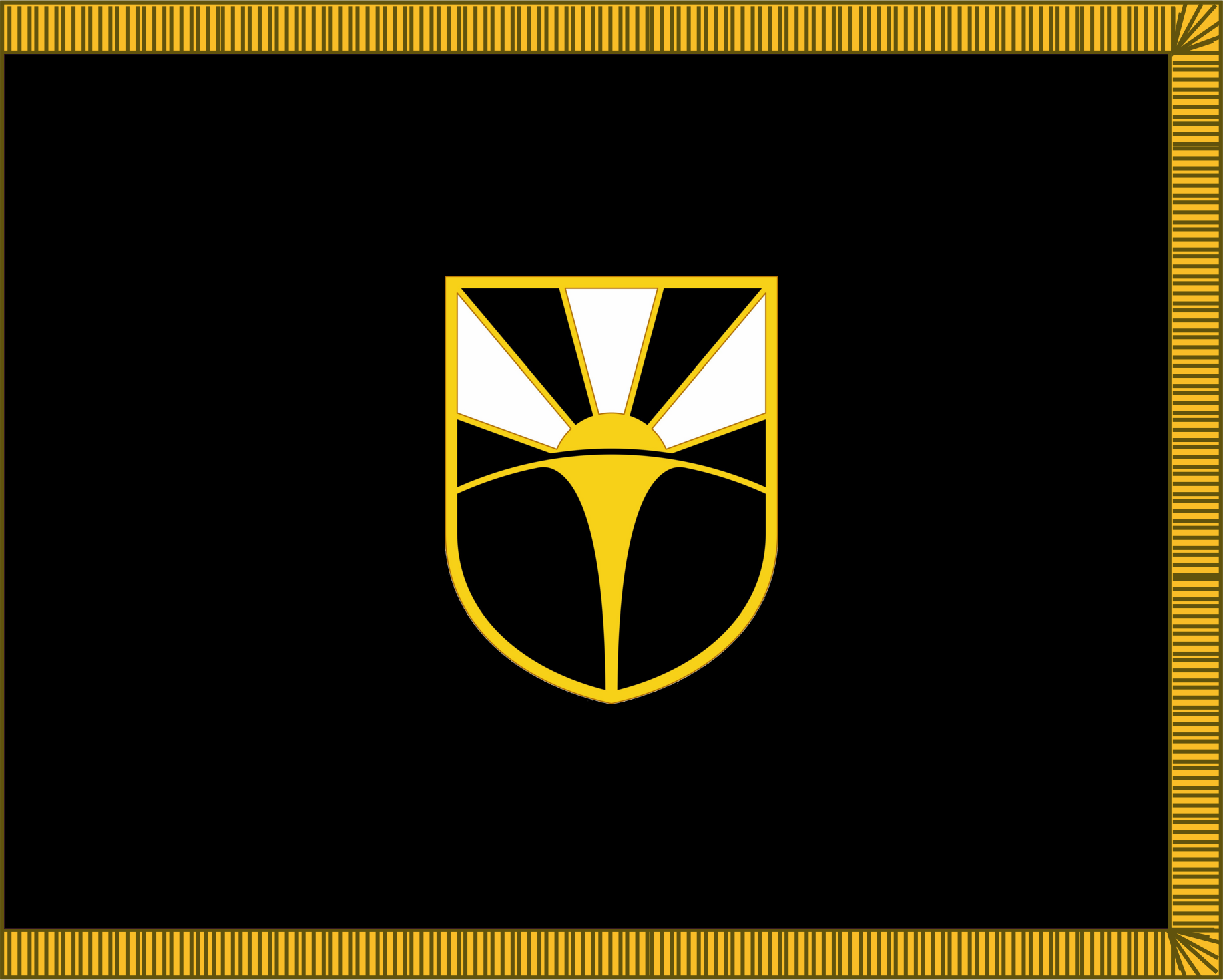
Combat Capabilities Development Command Flag

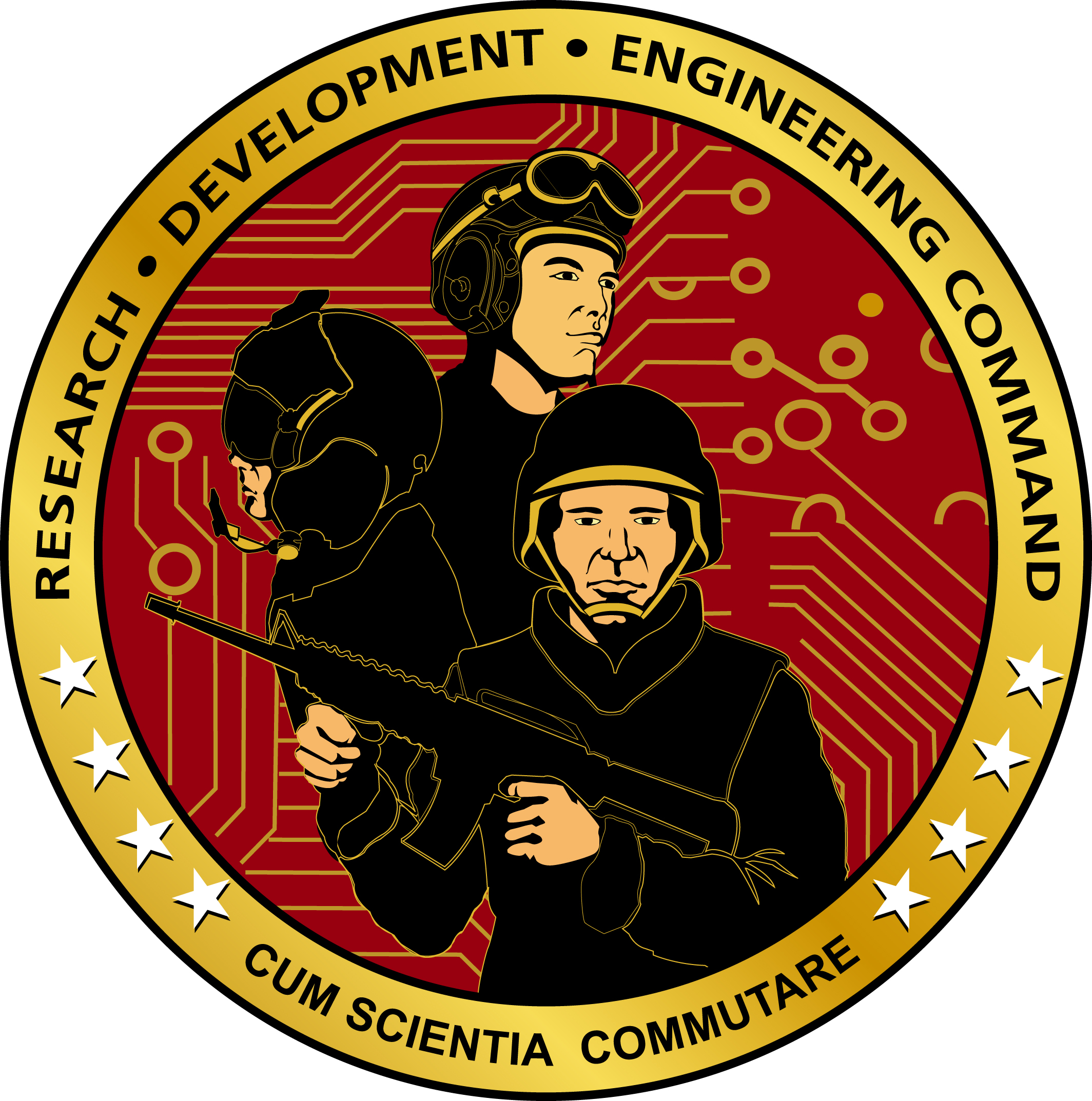
RDECOM distinctive unit insignia

RDECOM logo

General Kern proposed to unite the laboratories and research centers under a single command, and the idea was initiated to senior commanders and civilians. The new command was approved, and was established on a "provisional" basis in October 2002, at Aberdeen Proving Ground, Maryland, where it began to replace the headquarters element of U.S. Army Soldier and Biological Chemical Command (SBCCOM). In June 2003, RDECOM assumed operational control of the RDE centers. In October 2003, an organizational ceremony took place at Aberdeen Proving Ground, where SBCCOM officially stood down, and the 389th Army Band and AMC Acquisition Center were assigned to RDECOM.

RDECOM became a major subordinate command of the U.S. Army Materiel Command in March 2004, with over 17,000 military, civilian, and contractor personnel at the time. In 2006, the 389th Army Band was designated AMC Band and moved to Redstone Arsenal, Alabama. In 2008, the AMC Acquisition Center became part of the newly established U.S. Army Contracting Command, itself a major subordinate of AMC. From February 2012 to September 2014, RDECOM was led by a civilian commander, Dale Ormond, before returning to military command.

=== Transfer to Army Futures Command ===
As of 2018, DEVCOM reports to Army Futures Command, which will reach full operational capability by August 2019. The new command is focused on readiness for future combat with near-peer competitors, in a shift away from the unconventional, counter-insurgency warfare fought in various theatres since 2001.

On 4 June 2018, the Headquarters, Department of the Army published General Order 2018–10, "Establishment of the United States Army Futures Command", formally transferring RDECOM from AMC to the new command effective 1 July 2018. The transition of authority from AMC to AFC took place at Aberdeen Proving Ground, MD on 31 January 2019, with a reflagging of the command and repatching of the commander and CSM.

In 2021, CCDC rebranded to DEVCOM.

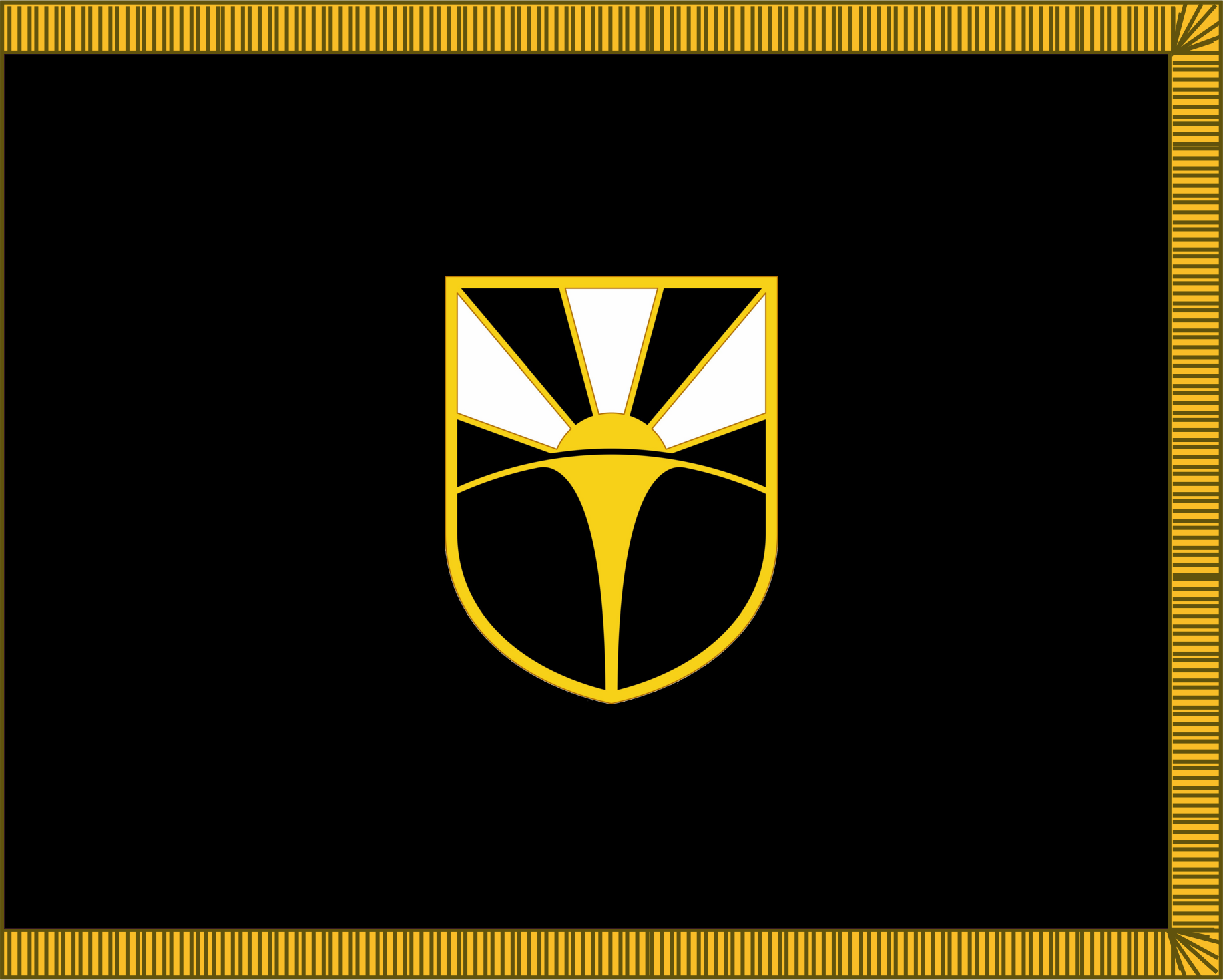
Combat Capabilities Development Command Flag

=== Transfer to Transformation and Training Command ===
In October 2025, the U.S. Army Futures Command (AFC) and U.S. Army Training and Doctrine Command (TRADOC) merged, forming the U.S. Army Transformation and Training Command (T2COM), which unified the recruitment, training, and equipment development missions under one command. DEVCOM, previously under AFC, was placed under the U.S. Army Futures and Concepts Command (FCC), a component of T2COM.

== List of commanding generals ==
No.	Commanding General		Term		
No.	Portrait	Name	Took office	Left office	Duration
As U.S. Army Research, Development and Engineering Command
1	John C. Doesburg	Major General; John C. Doesburg	October 2002	October 2004	~2 years, 0 days
2	Roger A. Nadeau	Major General; Roger A. Nadeau	October 2004	July 2007	~2 years, 273 days
3	Fred D. Robinson Jr.	Major General; Fred D. Robinson Jr.	July 2007	5 December 2008	~1 year, 157 days
4	Paul S. Izzo	Major General; Paul S. Izzo	5 December 2008	4 December 2009	364 days
5	Nick Justice	Major General; Nick Justice	4 December 2009	10 February 2012	2 years, 68 days
6	Dale A. Ormond	Dale A. Ormond	10 February 2012	22 September 2014	2 years, 224 days
7	John F. Wharton	Major General; John F. Wharton	22 September 2014	9 August 2016	1 year, 322 days
8	Cedric T. Wins	Major General; Cedric T. Wins	9 August 2016	3 February 2019	2 years, 178 days
As U.S. Army Combat Capabilities Development Command
1	Cedric T. Wins	Major General; Cedric T. Wins	3 February 2019	1 November 2019	271 days
2	John A. George	Major General; John A. George	1 November 2019	7 May 2021	1 year, 187 days
-	John T. Willison	John T. Willison; Acting	7 May 2021	9 July 2021	63 days
3	Edmond M. Brown	Major General; Edmond M. Brown	9 July 2021	7 September 2023	2 years, 60 days
4	John M. Cushing	Major General; John M. Cushing	7 September 2023	27 June 2025	1 year, 293 days
5	Robert G. Born	Brigadier General; Robert G. Born	27 June 2025	Incumbent	1 year, 73 days

== See also ==
- Marine Corps Warfighting Laboratory (MCWL)
- Naval Research Laboratory (NRL)
- Air Force Research Laboratory (AFRL)
- Space Systems Command (SSC)
- DARPA
