= United States Army Futures and Concepts Command =

Command of the Transformation and Training Command

U.S. Army Futures and Concepts Command
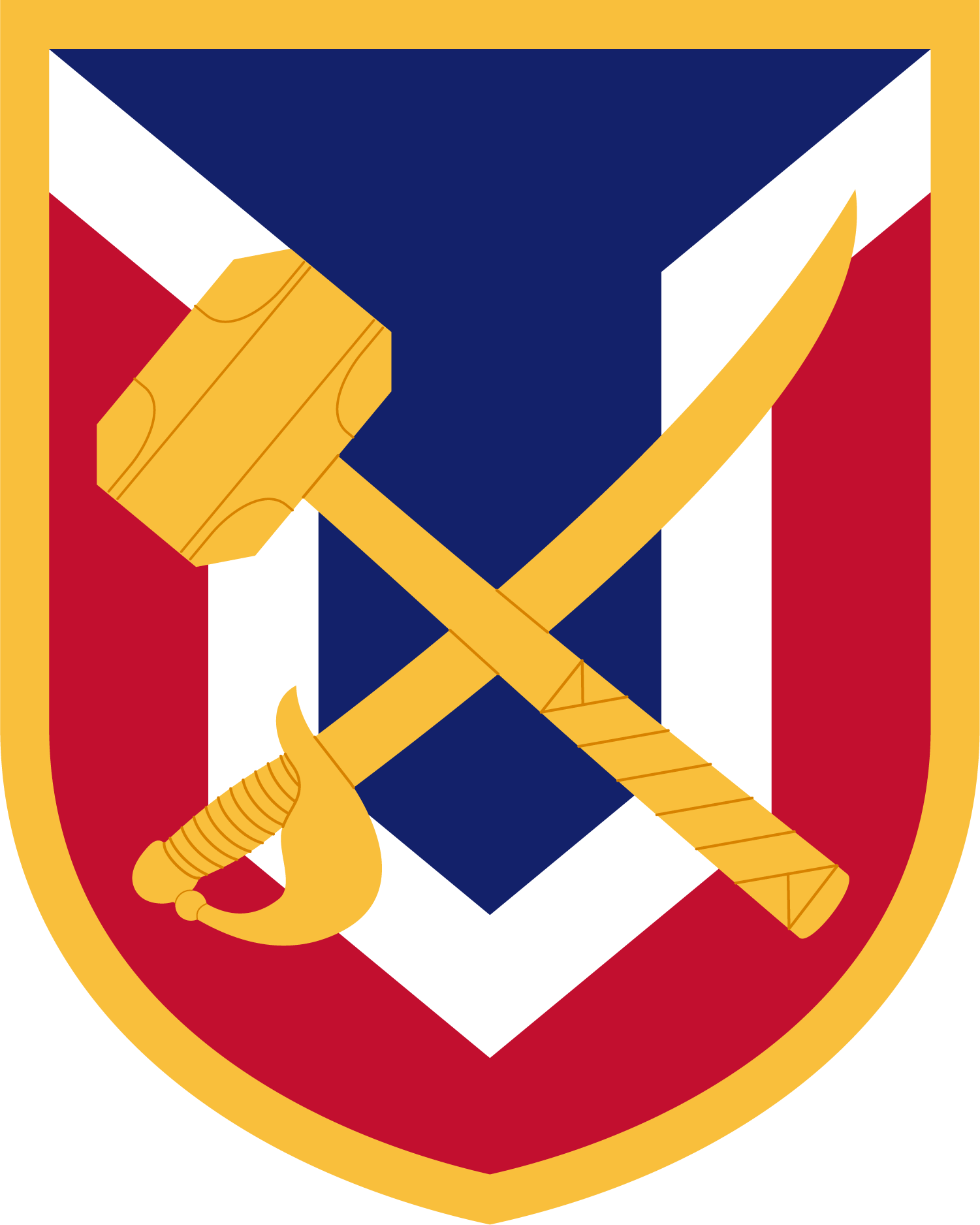
- Shoulder sleeve insignia
- Active: 2006–present
- Country: United States
- Branch: United States Army
- Part of: Transformation and Training Command
- Garrison/HQ: Fort Eustis, Virginia
- Motto: "Forging the Vision"
- Website: Official website

Commanders
- Current commander: LTG Michael C. McCurry II

Insignia
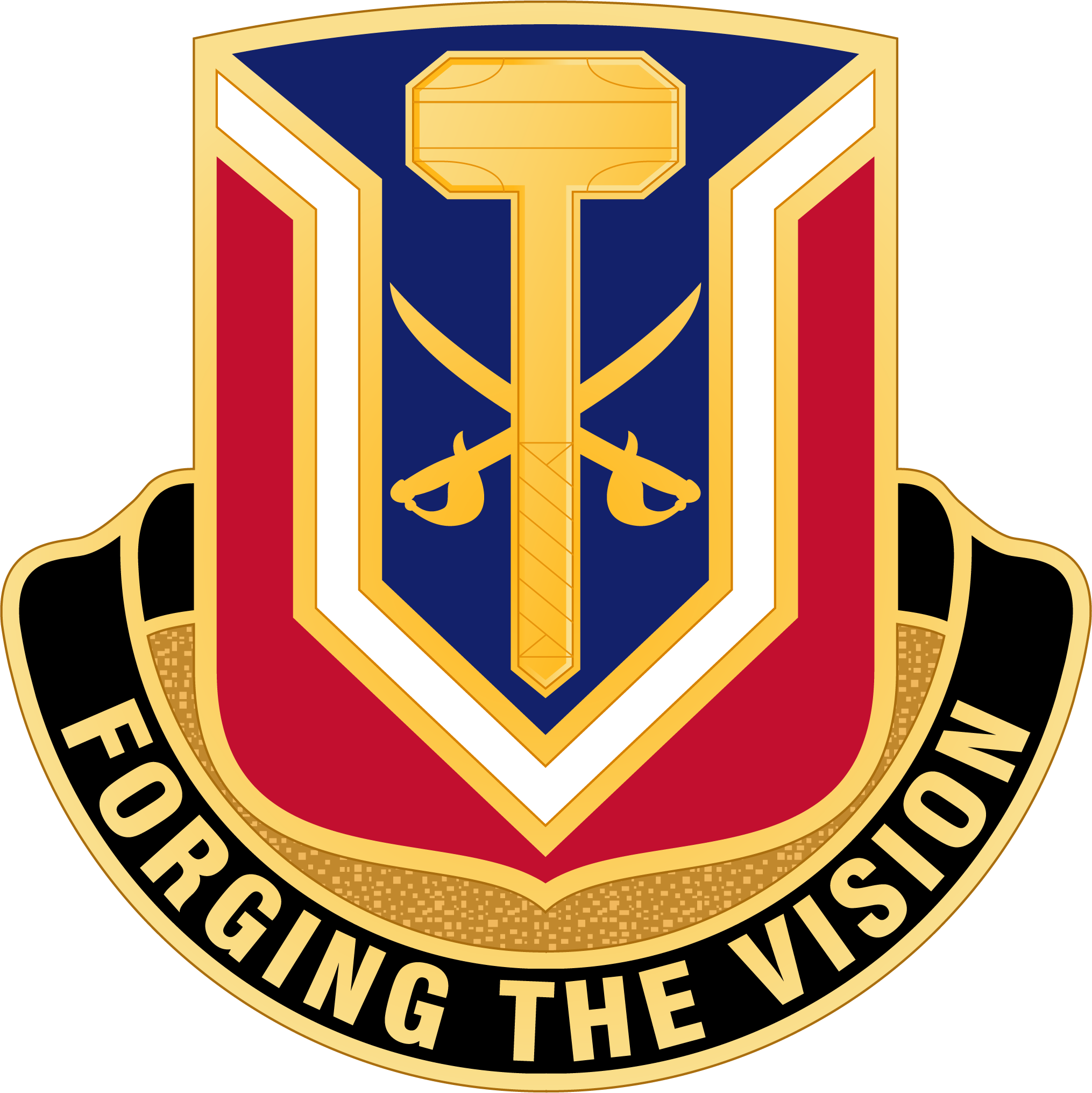
- Distinctive unit insignia

The United States Army Futures and Concepts Command (FCC) is located on Fort Eustis, Virginia, as a subordinate unit of the U.S. Army Transformation and Training Command (T2COM). FCC is tasked with testing management and establishing requirements for the Army's materiel, systems, training, and doctrine.

== History ==
On 1 October 2003, the U.S. Army Futures Center (FC), aka TRADOC Futures Center (FC), was established as a subordinate unit to the Training and Doctrine Command (TRADOC).

The Futures Center consisted of five directorates and a forward operating element:

- Combat Development and Experimentation Directorate
- Capabilities Developments Directorate
- Requirements Integration Directorate
- Architecture Integration and Management Directorate
- International Army Programs Directorate
- Futures Center (Forward), a liaison office located in Washington, D.C.

=== Army Capabilities Integration Center ===
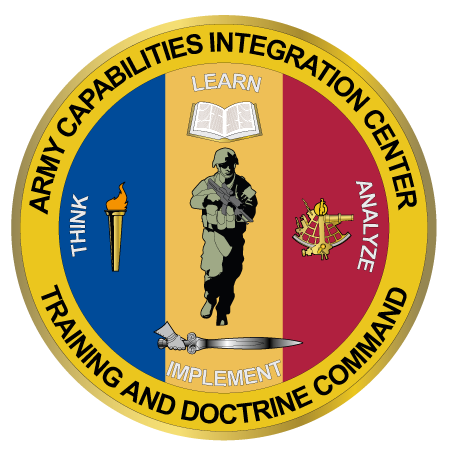
ARCIC emblem

In February 2006, U.S. Army Futures Center was redesignated U.S. Army Capabilities Integration Center (ARCIC), with headquarters at Fort Monroe, Virginia. ARCIC had a lead role in integrating the BCT modernization program into the army.

The ARCIC was organized as three directorates and one command:

- ARCIC Plans & Operations Directorate
- Concept Development and Learning Directorate
- International Army Programs Directorate
- Joint Modernization Command aka JMC (known as the Brigade Modernization Command, or BMC, from 2006 to 2017)

=== Transfer to Army Futures Command ===
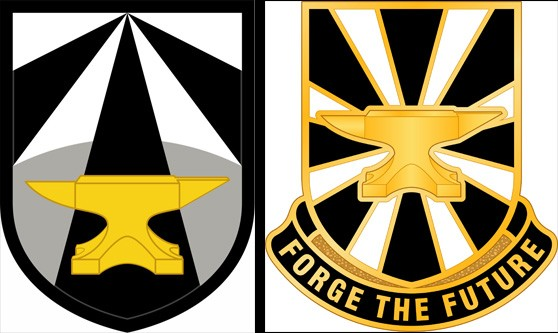
Army Futures Command shoulder sleeve insignia (left) and distinctive unit insignia (right)

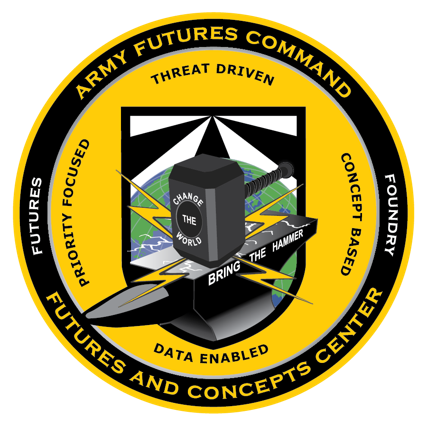
Emblem of the Futures and Concepts Center

On 1 July 2018, the U.S. Army Futures Command (AFC) was established, consolidating units that performed future development.

The transition from TRADOC to AFC took place ceremonially on 7 December 2018, at Fort Eustis, Virginia. It saw a reflagging of the center, and repatching of the commander and command sergeant major. At that time, ARCIC was redesignated U.S. Army Futures and Concepts Center (FCC).

The Futures and Concepts Center consisted of:

- Directorate of Concepts (DoC)
- Futures Integration Directorate (FID)
- Joint Modernization Command (JMC)
- Capability development and integration directorates (Note: Alternatively "capability development integration directorate".) (CDID)
  - Aviation CDID
  - Chaplin CDID
  - Cyber CDID
  - Fires CDID
  - Intelligence CDID
  - Maneuver CDID
  - Maneuver Support CDID
  - Medical CDID
  - Mission Command CDID
  - Sustainment CDID

=== Transfer to Transformation and Training Command ===
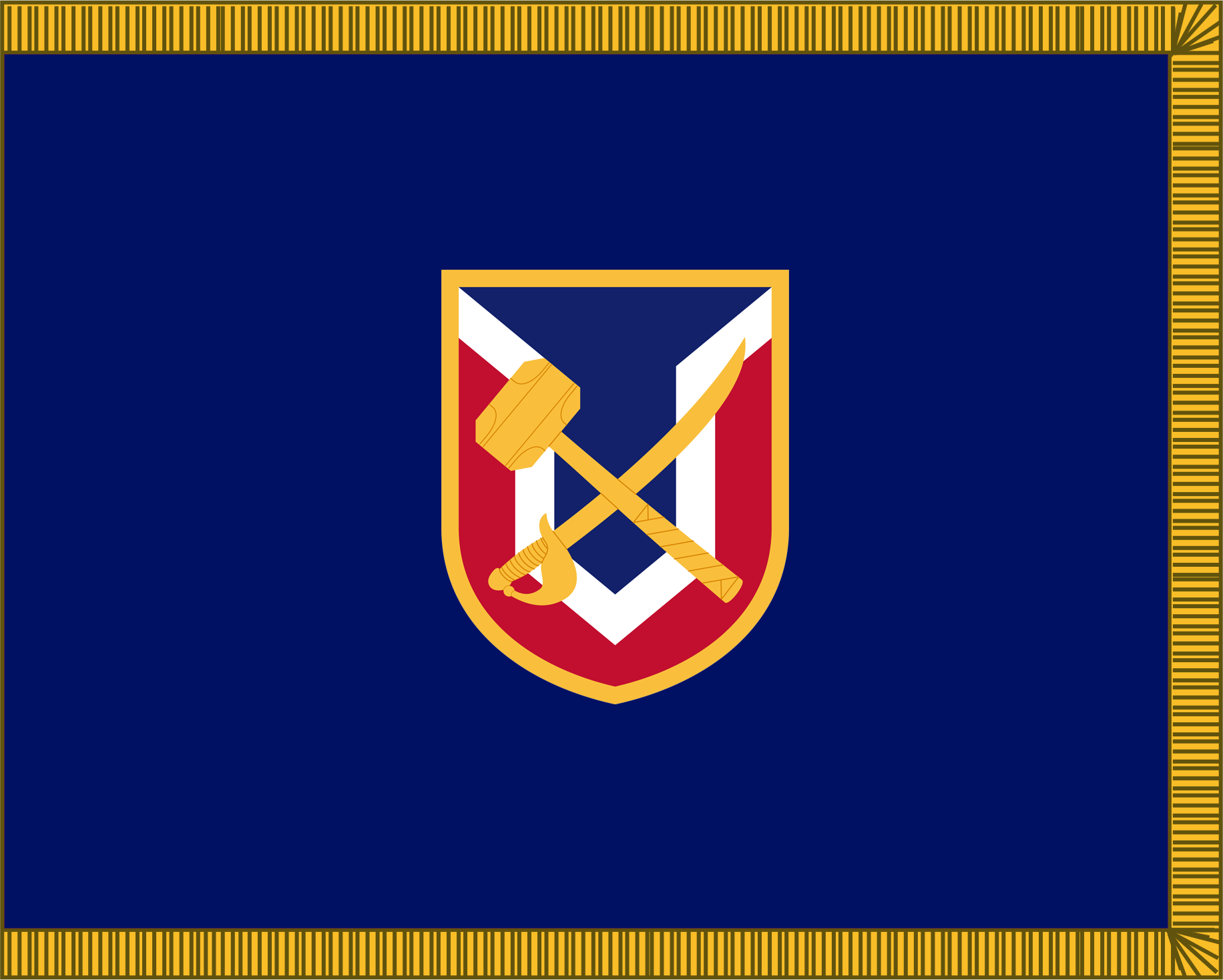
US Army Futures and Concepts Command Flag

In October 2025, the Army established the Transformation and Training Command (T2COM), consolidating the Army Futures Command with Training and Doctrine Command.

Accordingly, the Futures and Concepts Center became the Futures and Concepts Command (FCC). The FCC transferred from Army Futures Command to the Transformation and Training Command. The FCC also received several units including: the Combat Capabilities Development Command (DEVCOM), the Medical Research and Development Command (USAMRDC), and the Transformation Decision Analysis Center (TDAC). The DEVCOM Analysis Center (DAC) and The Research and Analysis Center (TRAC) have transitioned into the Transformation Decision Analysis Center (TDAC).

A new addition to the FCC organization is the nine Future Capability Directorates (FCDs). These are responsible for driving functional transformation by informing concepts, requirements, and experimentations. Combining what were previously the Capability Development Integration Directorates (CDIDs) and Cross-functional teams (CFTs), this new FCD structure improves unity of command and effort by eliminating redundant programs.

The Futures and Concepts Command consists of:

- Directorate of Concepts (DoC)
- Futures Integration Directorate (FID)
- Combat Capabilities Development Command (DEVCOM)
- Medical Research and Development Command (USAMRDC)
- Joint Modernization Command (JMC)
- Transformation Decision Analysis Center (TDAC)
- 75th U.S. Army Reserve Innovation Command (75th USARIC)
- Future capability directorates (FCD)
  - Aviation FCD
  - Command and Control FCD
  - Cyber FCD
  - Fires FCD
  - Formation Based Layered Protection (FBLP) FCD
  - Intelligence FCD
  - Maneuver FCD
  - Medical FCD
  - Sustainment FCD
