= William E. Ward =

US Army general

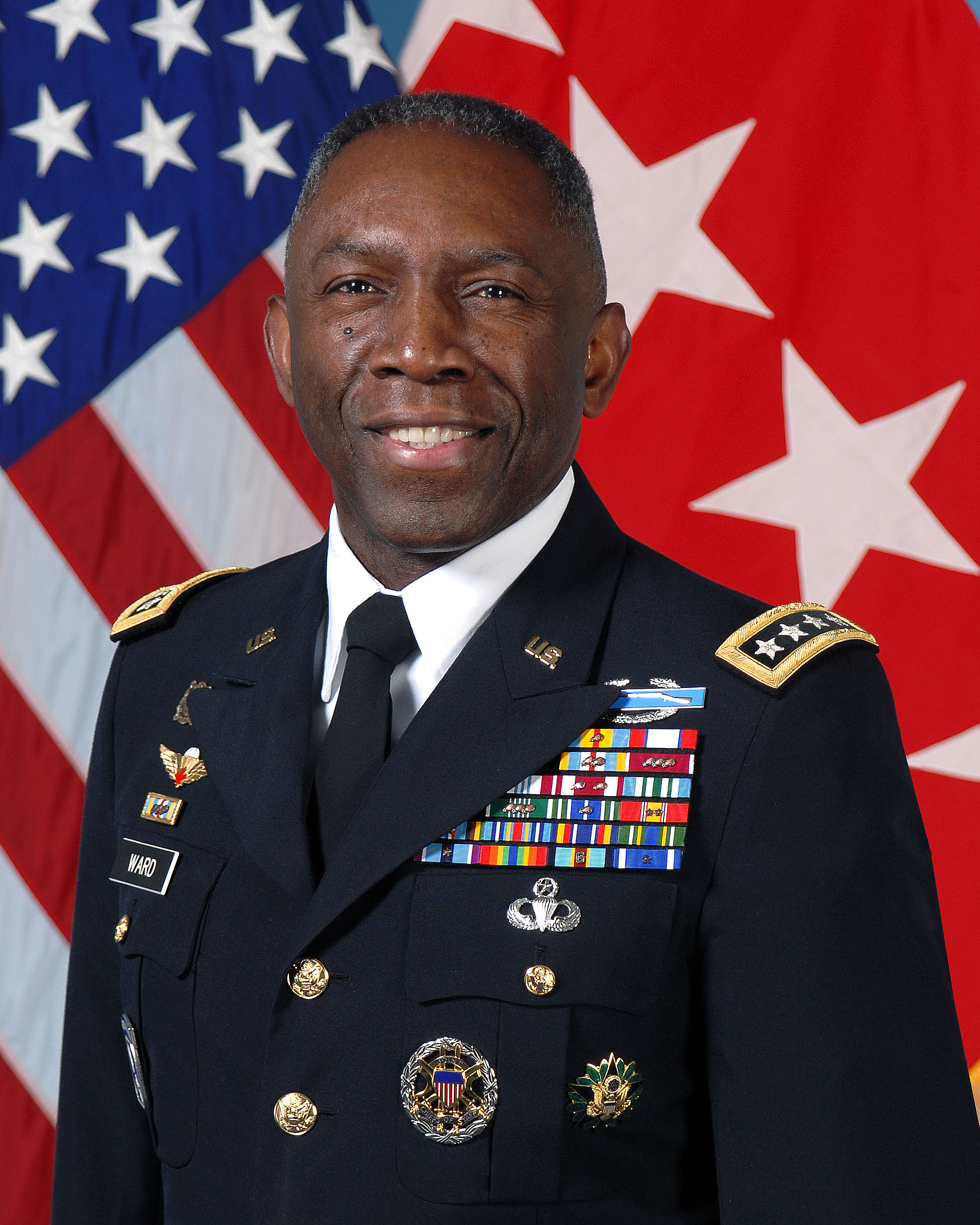
- Official portrait, 2009
- Born: 3 June 1949 (age 77); Baltimore, Maryland, U.S.
- Military career
- Allegiance: United States
- Branch: United States Army
- Service years: 1971–2012
- Rank: General (Retired as Lieutenant General)
- Nickname: "Kip"
- Commands: United States Africa Command; 25th Infantry Division
- Conflicts: Operation Restore Hope
- Awards: Defense Distinguished Service Medal (2); Army Distinguished Service Medal (1); Defense Superior Service Medal (3); Legion of Merit (4)

William E. "Kip" Ward (born 3 June 1949) is a retired United States Army general officer who served as the inaugural Commander of United States Africa Command from 1 October 2007 to 8 March 2011. During his long career in public service, he has taught international affairs and relations at West Point, US Military Academy; served as Commander of Stabilization Force, Operation Joint Forge, Sarajevo, Bosnia; was appointed the Secretary of State's Security Coordinator to the Israel - Palestinian Authority; Deputy Commander, Headquarters US European Command, Stuttgart, Germany; and many other progressively responsible assignments. He later retired and served as President and chief operating officer of the logistics, IT, and engineering business, V2X (fka Vectrus and SENTEL).

== Education ==
Ward holds a Master of Arts degree in Political Science from Pennsylvania State University and a Bachelor of Arts degree in Political Science from Morgan State University. While at Morgan State, he was a member of the National Society of Pershing Rifles. Over the course of his military service, he received military education at the Infantry Officer Basic and Advanced courses, US Army Command and General Staff College, and US Army War College.

== Career ==
Ward began his military career as a commissioned infantry officer in June 1971. His command and troop assignments include in chronological order: Platoon Leader, 3d Battalion (Airborne), 325th Infantry, 82d Airborne Division, Fort Bragg, North Carolina; Rifle Company Commander, 1st Battalion (Mechanized), 17th Infantry, 2d Infantry Division, Camp Howze, Korea; S-4 (Logistics), 210th Field Artillery Brigade, VII Corps, US Army Europe and Seventh Army, Germany; Executive Officer, 1st Battalion (Mechanized), 7th Infantry, 3d Infantry Division, US Army Europe and Seventh Army, Germany; Commander, 5th Battalion, 9th Infantry, 2d Brigade, later G-4 (Logistics), 6th Infantry Division (Light), Fort Wainwright, Alaska; Commander, 2d Brigade, 10th Mountain Division (Light), Fort Drum, New York and Operation Restore Hope, Mogadishu, Somalia; Assistant Division Commander (Support), 82d Airborne Division, Fort Bragg, North Carolina; Commanding General 25th Infantry Division (Light) and US Army, Hawaii, Schofield Barracks, Hawaii; and Commander, Stabilization Force, Operation Joint Forge, Sarajevo, Bosnia.

His staff assignments include: Executive Officer, US Army Military Community Activity—Aschaffenburg, US Army Europe and Seventh Army, Germany; Staff Officer (Logistics), Office of the Deputy Chief of Staff for Logistics, US Army, Washington, DC; Executive Officer to the Vice Chief of Staff, US Army, Washington, DC; Deputy Director for Operations, J-3, National Military Command Center, The Joint Staff, Washington, DC; Chief, Office of Military Cooperation, Egypt, American Embassy, Egypt; and Vice Director for Operations, J-3, The Joint Staff, Washington, DC.

Prior to assuming command at U.S. Africa Command, Ward was Deputy Commander, US European Command, Stuttgart, Germany. He previously served as the Deputy Commanding General/Chief of Staff, US Army Europe and Seventh Army. While in this capacity he was selected by the Secretary of State to serve as the United States Security Coordinator, Israel - Palestinian Authority where he served from March through December 2005.

General Ward's awards and badges include: the Defense Distinguished Service Medal (with Oak Leaf Cluster); the Distinguished Service Medal; the Defense Superior Service Medal (with two Oak Leaf Clusters); the Legion of Merit (with three Oak Leaf Clusters); the Defense Meritorious Service Medal; the Meritorious Service Medal (with six Oak Leaf Clusters); the Joint Service Commendation Medal; the Army Commendation Medal (with three Oak Leaf Clusters); the Army Achievement Medal (with Oak Leaf Cluster); the Expert Infantryman's Badge; the Combat Infantryman's Badge; and the Master Parachutist Badge.

On 8 March 2011, General Ward was relieved and succeeded as commander of US Africa Command by General Carter F. Ham. In November 2012, Ward was reappointed to three-star general (Lieutenant General) grade and ordered to pay restitution for using public funds for private travel.

After his relief from commanding US Africa Command, by law without confirmation by the Senate to another temporary 3-star or 4-star appointment Ward reverted to the rank of major general, his highest permanent grade previously held. He then served as a special assistant to the army's vice chief of staff during which an investigation was conducted on Ward’s use of official funds. While an official retirement ceremony was held in April 2011, Ward remained on active duty pending a special Army investigation by the Office of the Inspector General, U.S. Department of Defense.

The investigation ran 17 months and ended with a decision by Defense Secretary Leon Panetta. He was not found as being derelict in his duties or for improper performance, but for keeping poor official records of his travel expenses, for unnecessarily extending official trips for personal reasons, and allowing his wife to travel on military aircraft without sufficient justification. Ward was then approved by the Secretary of Defense for formal retirement with the grade of lieutenant general in November 2012, which was determined to be the last grade in which he had satisfactorily served.

=== Career highlights ===
- 2002: Commander, NATO Stabilisation Force, Operation Joint Forge, Bosnia and Herzegovina.
- 2003: Deputy Commander, United States Army Europe.
- 2005: Special Envoy to Israel and Palestine – working specifically to help reform the security services of the Palestinian authority – under George W. Bush and Condoleezza Rice.
- 2007: Named inaugural commander of United States Africa Command (AFRICOM) by President George W. Bush. Chief of the Office of Military Cooperation at the U.S. Embassy in Cairo.

== Post-military ==
Since retiring, Ward has served as President and chief operating officer of the logistics, IT, and engineering business, Vectrus (fka SENTEL).

Ward continues to engage the strategy and policy community on matters of global security, including his participation in the Atlantic Council's 2018 Roundtable on security in Mali and ongoing discussions on the role of diplomacy in global stability, including the American Academy of Diplomacy's podcast series, “The General and the Ambassador". He also speaks to student groups on issues surrounding peace and global security and leadership.

Ward also serves on the Advisory Board of Redwood Global, an infrastructure, energy and investment firm.

== Awards and decorations ==
Ward received the following awards and decorations:

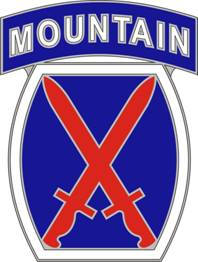
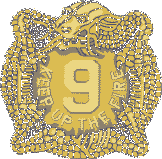
Combat Infantryman Badge
Expert Infantryman Badge
Master Parachutist Badge (United States)
Joint Chiefs of Staff Identification Badge
Army Staff Identification Badge
10th Mountain Division Combat Service Identification Badge – SSI-FWTS
9th Infantry Regiment Distinctive Unit Insignia
Canadian Parachutist Wings (Red Maple Leaf / Non-Operational)

Defense Distinguished Service Medal (with two bronze Oak Leaf Cluster)
Army Distinguished Service Medal (with oak leaf cluster)
Defense Superior Service Medal (with 2 Oak Leaf Clusters)
Legion of Merit (with 3 Oak Leaf Clusters)
Defense Meritorious Service Medal
Meritorious Service Medal (with 6 Oak Leaf Clusters)
Joint Service Commendation Medal
Army Commendation Medal (with 3 Oak Leaf Clusters)
Army Achievement Medal (with Oak Leaf Cluster)
Joint Meritorious Unit Award (with 3 Oak Leaf Clusters)
National Defense Service Medal (with two bronze service stars)
Armed Forces Expeditionary Medal with bronze service star
Global War on Terrorism Expeditionary Medal
Global War on Terrorism Service Medal
Korea Defense Service Medal
Humanitarian Service Medal with bronze service star
Army Service Ribbon
Overseas Service Ribbon (with award numeral 6)
NATO Medal for Yugoslavia with bronze service star

William E. Ward received the Trumpet Award in 2010 as well as the BEYA award for Lifetime Achievement.

== Notable memberships ==
- 100 Black Men of America
- Omega Psi Phi
- Sigma Pi Phi
- The National Society of Pershing Rifles
