= Military base =

Facility directly owned and operated by or for the military

A military base is a facility directly owned and operated by or for a military or one of its branches that shelters military equipment and personnel, and facilitates training and operations. A military base always provides accommodations for one or more units, but it may also be used as a command center, training ground or proving ground. In most cases, military bases rely on outside help to operate. However, certain complex bases are able to endure on their own for long periods because they are able to provide food, drinking water, and other necessities for their inhabitants while under siege. Bases for military aviation are called air bases. Bases for military ships are called naval bases.

== Jurisdictional definition ==
Military bases within the United States are considered federal property and are subject to federal law. Civilians (such as family members of military officers) living on military bases are generally subject to the civil and criminal laws of the states where the bases are located. Military bases can range from small outposts to military cities containing up to 100,000 people. A military base may belong to a different nation or state than the territory surrounding it.

== Naming ==
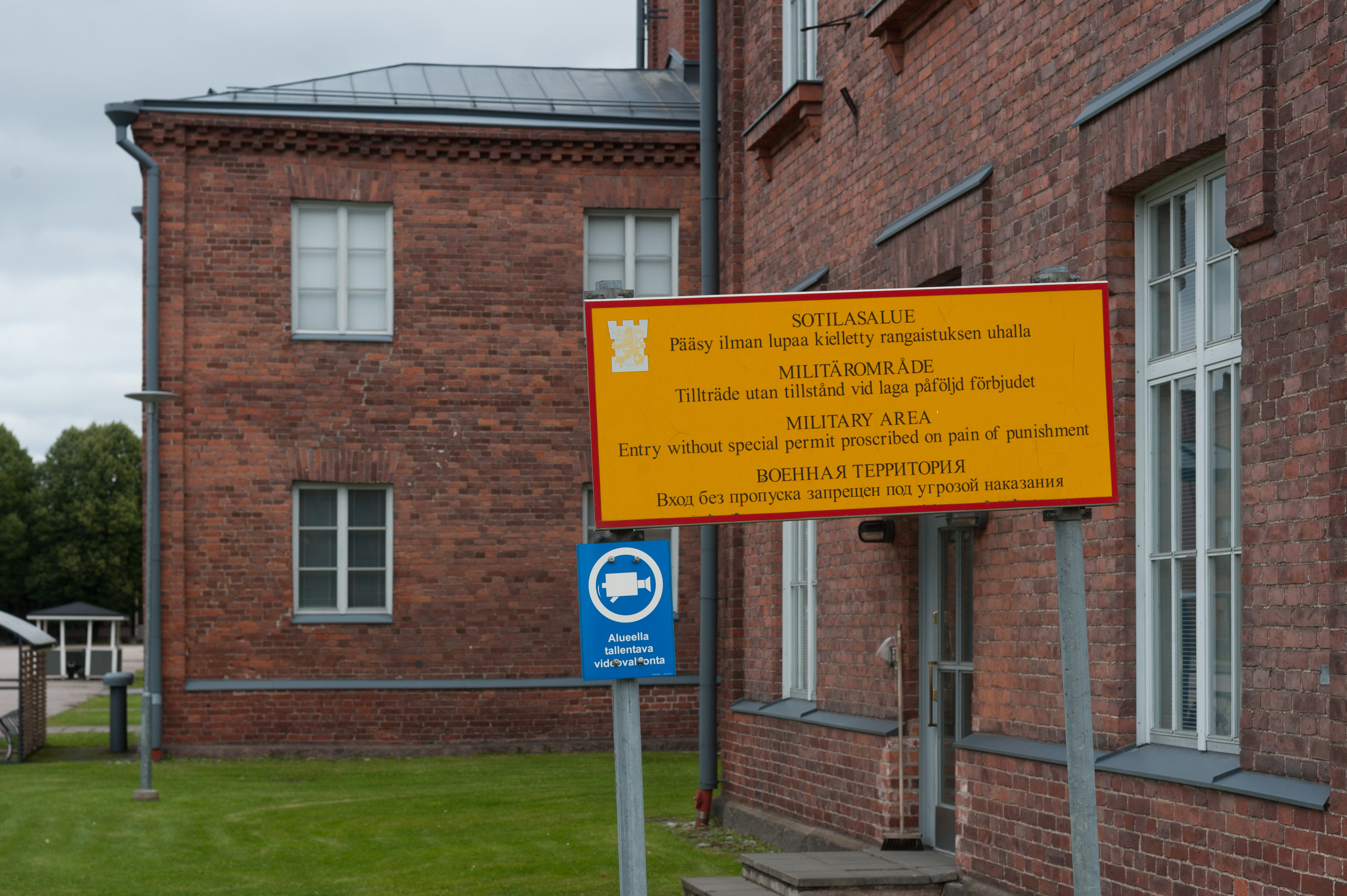
A sign at the Raakunamäki Military Area in Lappeenranta, Finland

The name used generally refers to the type of military activity that takes place at the base, as well as the traditional nomenclature used by a branch of service.

A military base may go by any of a number of names, such as the following:

- Ammunition dump
- Armory
- Arsenal
- Advance airfield
- Barracks
- Border outpost
- Cantonment
- Casern
- Combat outpost (COP)
- Facility
- Fire support base (FSB, FB)
- Forward Operating Base (FOB)
- Forward operating site (FOS)
- Fortification
- Garrison
- Installation
- Joint base
- Magazine
- Main Operating Base (MOB)
- Marine Corps base
- Military airbase, airfield or field
- Military camp
- Missile launch facility
- Naval air station
- Naval base
- Naval dockyard
- Naval shipyard
- Observation post
- Outpost (OP)
- Presidio
- Proving ground
- Reservation
- Satellite airfield
- Station
- Submarine base
- Training camp

== Types of establishment ==
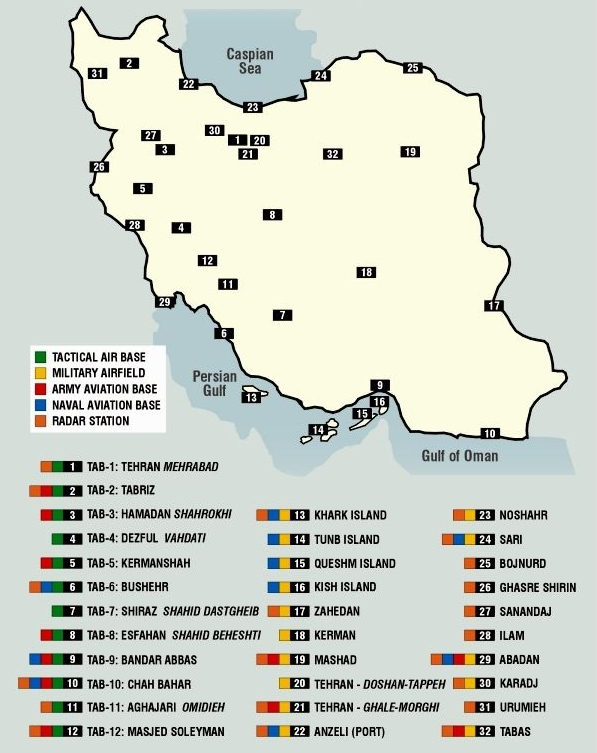
Different kinds of military installations of Iran – 2002

Depending on the context, the term "military base" may refer to any establishment (usually permanent) that houses a nation's armed forces, or even organized paramilitary forces such as the police, constabulary, militia, or national guards. Alternatively, the term may refer solely to an establishment which is used only by an army (or possibly other land fighting related forces, such as marines) to the exclusion of a base used by either an air force or a navy. This is consistent with the different meanings of the word 'military'.

Some examples of permanent military bases used by the navies and air forces of the world are the HMNB Portsmouth in Portsmouth, UK, the Naval Air Station Whidbey Island, Washington State, US, or Ramstein Air Base, Germany (the last two are each designated as a Main Operating Base). Other examples of non- or semi-permanent military bases include a Forward Operating Base (FOB), a Logistics Base (Log base) and a Fire Base (FB).

A military base may also contain large concentrations of military supplies in order to support military logistics. Most military bases are restricted to the public and usually only authorized personnel may enter them (be it military personnel or their relatives and authorized civilian personnel).

In addition to the main military facilities on a certain installation, military bases usually (but not always) have various different facilities for military personnel. These facilities vary from country to country. Military bases can provide housing for military personnel, a post office and dining facilities (restaurants). They may also provide support facilities such as fast food restaurants, gas stations, chapels, schools, banks, thrift stores, a hospital or clinic (dental or health clinics, as well as veterinarian clinics), lodging, movie theaters, and, in some countries, retail stores (usually a supermarket such as Commissary and a Department Store, such as AAFES). On American military installations, Family, Morale, Welfare and Recreation (FMWR) provides facilities such as fitness centers, libraries, golf courses, travel centers, community service centers, campgrounds, child development centers, youth centers, automotive workshops, hobby/arts and crafts centers, bowling centers, and community centers.

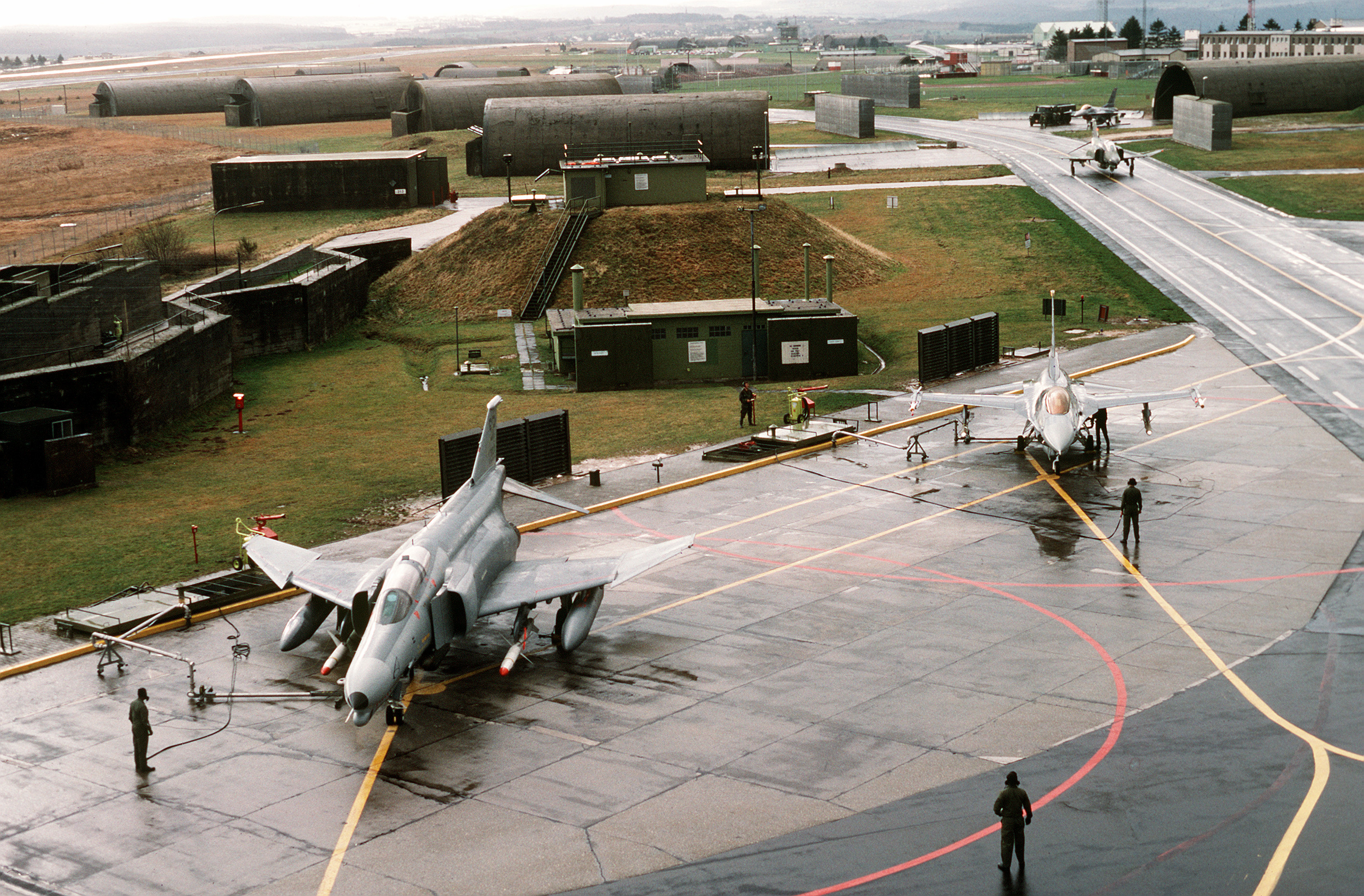
Part of USAF Spangdahlem Air Base in 1990

Bases used by the United States Air Force Reserve tend to be active USAF bases. However, there are a few Air Reserve Bases, such as Dobbins ARB, Georgia, and Grissom ARB, Indiana, both of which are former active-duty USAF bases. Facilities of the Air National Guard are often located on civil airports in a secure cantonment area not accessible to the general public, though some units are based on USAF bases, and a few ANG-operated bases, such as Selfridge ANGB, Michigan. Support facilities on Air National Guard and Air Force Reserve installations tend to not be as extensive as active bases (i.e., they usually do not have on-base lodging (though Kingsley Field ANGB, Oregon, is an exception), clinics (except for drill days), or retail stores (although some have small convenience stores)).

In Russian usage "military base" or "naval base" is not limited to denoting a specific fence described facility and usually encompasses a broad territory within which a number of discrete facilities may be located. As examples, 1) the Russian Sevastopol Naval Base comprises individual facilities located within the city of Sevastopol proper (waterfront moorings, weapons stores, a headquarters compound, and a naval infantry base) as well as an airfield at Kacha north of the city; 2) the Leningrad Naval Base comprises all naval facilities in the greater St. Petersburg area including training schools, commissioning institutes, the naval academy, and the Kronshtadt base on Kotlin island.

== Overseas military base ==
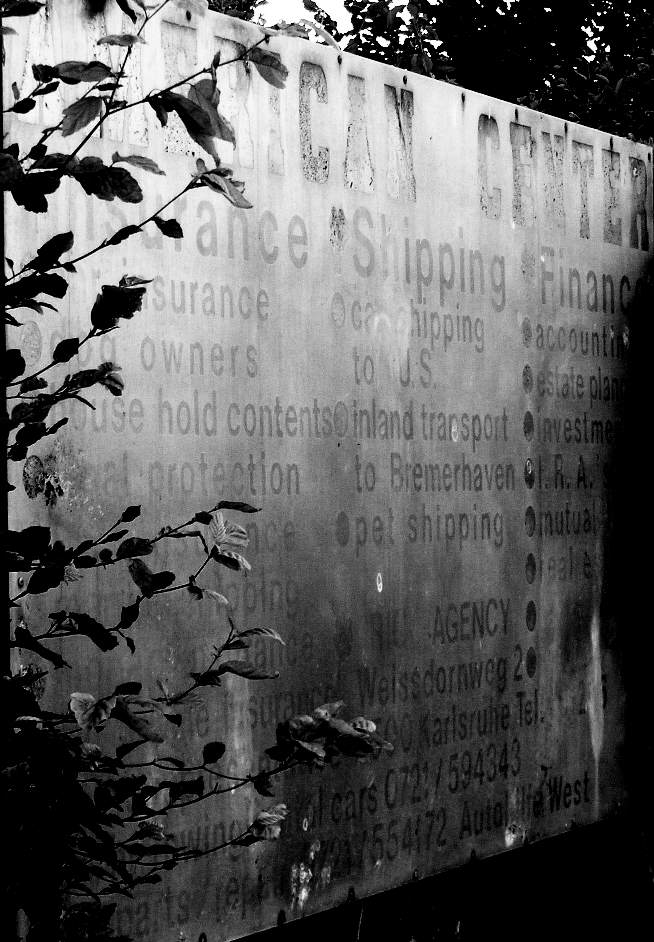
Civilian services offered to soldiers outside a military base

An overseas military base is a military base that is geographically located outside of the territory of the country whose armed forces are the principal occupants of the base.

Such bases may be established by treaties between the governing power in the host country and another country which needs to establish the military base in the host country for various reasons, usually strategic and logistic.

Furthermore, overseas military bases often serve as the source of the military brat subculture due to the children of the bases' occupant military being born or raised in the host country but raised with a remote parental knowledge of the occupant military's home country.

== Related term ==
- Billet
- Kaserne

== See also ==
- List of United States military bases
- Overseas military bases of the United Kingdom
- List of military bases
