= G5 Sahel =

Organisation of the governments of Burkina Faso, Niger, Chad, Mali and Mauritania

G5 du Sahel G5 Sahel
- 2014–2023
- logo

- Map of G5 Sahel member states
- Administrative center: Nouakchott, Mauritania
- Spoken: French
- Type: Security alliance
- Membership: 5 states: Burkina Faso; Chad; Mali; Mauritania; Niger

Leaders
  - Executive Secretary: Maman Sambo Sidikou; Najim Elhadj Mohamed
- History
  - Established: 16 February 2014
  - Withdrawal of Mali: 15 May 2022
  - Withdrawal of Burkina Faso and Niger: 3 December 2023
  - Disestablished: 6 December 2023
- Website; G5Sahel.org

G5 Sahel or G5S (French: G5 du Sahel) was an institutional framework for coordination of regional cooperation in development policies and security matters in West Africa. It was created on 16 February 2014 in Nouakchott, Mauritania, at a summit of five Sahel countries: Burkina Faso, Chad, Mali, Mauritania, and Niger. It adopted a convention of establishment on 19 December 2014, and was permanently seated in Mauritania. The coordination was organised on different levels with military aspects coordinated by the respective countries' Chiefs of Staff. The purpose of G5 Sahel was to strengthen the bond between economic development and security, and together battle the threat of jihadist organizations operating in the region, including AQIM, MOJWA, Al-Mourabitoun, and Boko Haram.

A series of new military juntas in the region prompted several countries to withdraw from the G5 Sahel alliance. On 15 May 2022, Mali announced its withdrawal from the alliance following its 2021 coup d'état. On 3 December 2023, Burkina Faso and Niger announced their withdrawals from the alliance following their 2022 and 2023 coups respectively. On 6 December 2023, the remaining members Chad and Mauritania announced the dissolution of the alliance.

== History ==
On 1 August 2014, France launched a counterterrorism mission, Operation Barkhane, deploying 3,000 soldiers in the member states of G5 Sahel. On 20 December, G5 Sahel, with the backing of the African Union, called on the United Nations Security Council to set up an international force to "neutralize armed groups, help national reconciliation, and establish stable democratic institutions in Libya." This was met with opposition from Algeria.

In June 2017, France requested that the United Nations Security Council approve the deployment of a counterterrorism task force consisting of 10,000 soldiers to G5 Sahel. The German Bundeswehr has agreed to contribute around 900 troops of its own to help the mission. They will mostly be utilized in the Gao region of Northern Mali for surveillance purposes. The European Union agreed to provide 50 million euros towards financing the force. Russia and China expressed support for the operation, while the United States and the United Kingdom did not agree about financing. France and the U.S. reached an agreement on 20 June 2017. The next day, the United Nations Security Council unanimously approved the deployment of a G5 Sahel counterterrorism task force. On 29 June, French Foreign Affairs Minister Jean-Yves Le Drian announced that the French military would cooperate with G5 Sahel.

=== Withdrawal of Mali ===
In 2022, Chad, which held the presidency of the G5 Sahel, was due to give way to Mali. However, some countries in the alliance were opposed to Mali's presidency, due to the political situation in Mali (which saw two coups d'état in August 2020 and May 2021). In response to this opposition, the Malian authorities announced in a communiqué signed by the Ministry of Territorial Administration and Decentralization and broadcast on public television on 15 May 2022 that "the government of Mali has decided to withdraw from all G5 Sahel bodies and authorities, including the Joint Force", and denounced "instrumentalization." In August 2023, Mauritanian President Mohamed Ould Ghazouani, who held the presidency of the G5 Sahel, declared that he "regretted Mali's withdrawal" and that he "hoped it would be very temporary ".

=== Withdrawal of Burkina Faso and Niger ===
Following coup d'états in September 2022 in Burkina Faso and in July 2023 in Niger, the leaders of both countries announced on 2 December 2023 that they would withdraw from all instances of the alliance, citing that it was "failing to reach its objectives". They added that the alliance "cannot serve foreign interests to the detriments of our people", referencing France.

=== Dissolution ===
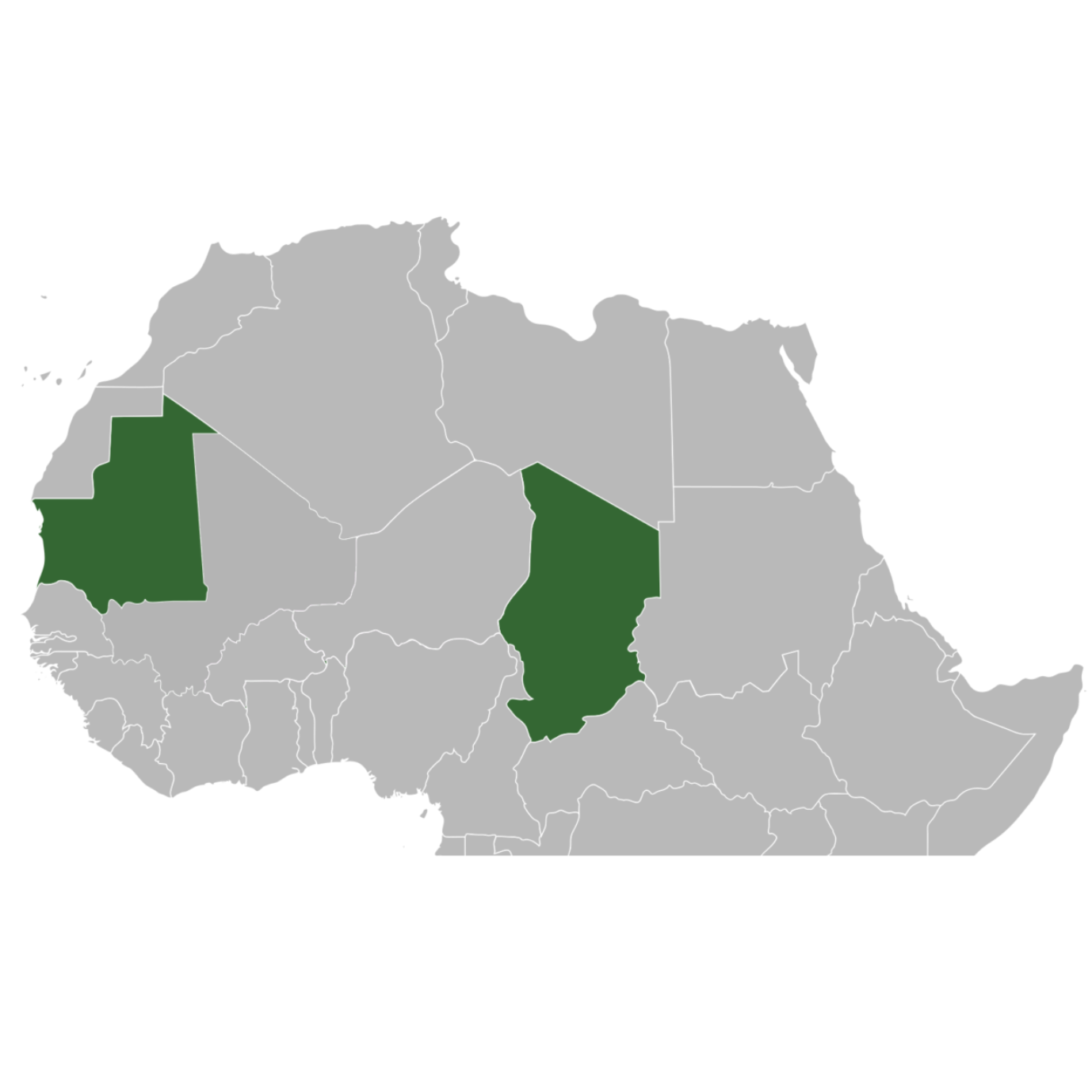
G5 Sahel at time of dissolution

On 6 December 2023, remaining members Chad and Mauritania announced that they were planning to dissolve the alliance due to the withdrawal of three of its founding members.

Mali, Burkina Faso, and Niger went on to form their own alliance, the Alliance of Sahel States, soon after.

== See also ==
- Pan Sahel Initiative
