= Pan Sahel Initiative =

The Pan-Sahel Initiative, according to a November 7, 2002, by the Office of Counterterrorism, U.S. Department of State, was "a State-led effort to assist Mali, Niger, Chad, and Mauritania in detecting and responding to suspicious movement of people and goods across and within their borders through training, equipment and cooperation. Its goals support two U.S. national security interests in Africa: waging the war on terrorism and enhancing regional peace and security." It was in 2005 superseded by the larger-scope Trans-Saharan Counterterrorism Initiative, which in turn was incorporated into the United States Africa Command in 2008.

== Pan-Sahel Initiative ==
PSI drew criticism for its lack of attention of underlying regional economic problems and local political struggles, the conduct of partner governments against those suspected of being "terrorists", and for indirectly radicalizing certain groups living in or near the Sahara.

"According to State Department officials, the Pan-Sahel region of Africa has become important in the global security arena. Vast expanses of unpopulated areas, instability, porous borders and corruption make Africa an inviting playground for terrorists."

Voice of America's Alex Belida reported on November 14, 2003, that the "multimillion dollar security training and equipment program" was "at last under way" in Mali, "a year after it was announced." The program was to continue in the other three countries "over the next several months."

Belida said that "Army Colonel John Schnibben, operations director at U.S. European Command, responsible for most of sub-Saharan Africa, says the effort could have a big pay-off for the United States and its Sahel partners."

Belida reported that in October 2002, "AF DAS Robert Perry and S/CT Deputy Coordinator Stephanie Kinney, along with other State representatives, visited Chad, Niger, Mauritania and Mali, briefing host nations on the Pan-Sahel Initiative (PSI) ... a program designed to protect borders, track movement of people, combat terrorism, and enhance regional cooperation and stability."

Beginning in November 2002, "technical assessments" took place in each country to "help focus training and other capacity building resources." PSI was to "assist participating countries to counter known terrorist operations and border incursions, as well as trafficking of people, illicit materials, and other goods."

In addition to the "training and material support," the release states, another program would "bring military and civilian officials from the four countries together to encourage greater cooperation and information exchange within and among the governments of the region on counterterrorism and border security issues."

The Associated Press reported on May 6, 2004, that "The European Command has proposed expanding the Pan-Sahel Initiative to include Morocco, Tunisia and Algeria, where terror threats are believed to be growing...." [AP link not working.]

In the May 11, 2004, New York Times, Craig Smith states that the "U.S. [is] Training African Forces to Uproot Terrorists."

Smith says that the Pan-Sahel Initiative "was begun with $7 million and focused on Mali, Mauritania, Niger and Chad. It is being expanded to include Senegal and possibly other countries. The U.S. European Command has asked for $125 million for the region over five years."The Pan-Sahel Initiative is the newest front in the "American campaign against terrorism ... in a region that military officials fear could become the next base for Al Qaeda -- the largely ungoverned swath of territory stretching from the Horn of Africa to the Western Sahara's Atlantic coast," he writes.

"Generals here ... say the vast, arid region is a new Afghanistan, with well-financed bands of Islamic militants recruiting, training and arming themselves. Terrorist attacks like the one on March 11 [2004] in Madrid that killed 191 people seem to have a North African link, investigators say, and may presage others in Europe."

"Having learned from missteps in Afghanistan and Iraq," he says, "the American officers are pursuing this battle with a new approach. Instead of planning on a heavy American military presence, they are dispatching Special Operations forces to countries like Mali and Mauritania in West Africa to train soldiers and outfit them with pickup trucks, radios and global-positioning equipment."

Drew Brown, in his May 12, 2004, Knight Ridder article adds that "Marine Corps Gen. James Jones, the commander of U.S. European Command, which covers most of Africa ... said that shortly after he took command of NATO in January 2002, a six-month analysis of U.S. force structure within European Command concluded that the United States likely would face a number of security challenges in Africa over the next 10 to 15 years and that a more robust engagement was needed.

"Late last year, soldiers from the 10th Special Forces Group began training military forces in Mali, Mauritania, Chad and Niger under the Pan-Sahel Initiative, a $7 million State Department program designed to help the security forces of those impoverished nations defend against terrorists.

"That effort follows the establishment of Task Force Horn of Africa, where more than 1,200 Marines and special-operations soldiers are heading up anti-terror training and operations in eastern Africa from a base in Djibouti.

"No U.S. forces have been committed to combat in Africa, Jones said. Involvement has consisted primarily of training and advisory teams."

In 2009, a NYTimes article reviewed the PSI, particularly as it played out in and now underlies current policy scenarios in Mauritania.

== See also ==
- Combined Joint Task Force-Horn of Africa
- G5 Sahel
- League of Arab States
- Military-industrial complex
- Operation Enduring Freedom
- Pax Americana
- Sahel
- Sahel drought

== Sources ==
- David Gutelius, "US creates African enemies where none were before" Christian Science Monitor, July 9, 2003.
- David Gutelius, "War on Terror and Social Networks in Mali" ISIM Review, Spring 2006.
- 1st Lt. Phillip Ulmer, "1/10 Special Forces Group Supports Pan Sahel Initiative," 435th Air Base Wing Public Affairs, Timbuktu, Mali, March 4, 2004.
- 1st Lt. Phillip Ulmer, "Special Forces Support Pan Sahel Initiative in Africa," Special to American Forces Press Service, March 8, 2004: "Special Forces training teams from Special Operations Command Europe are in Bamako, Gao and Timbuktu, Mali; and Atar, Mauritania in northwestern Africa to provide foreign internal defense training for the Pan Sahel Initiative, a U.S. State Department security assistance program."
- 1st Lt. Phillip Ulmer, "Airmen Support Pan Sahel Initiative," 435th Air Base Wing Public Affairs, Timbuktu, Mali, March 17, 2004.
- Ed Harris, "U.S. takes anti-terror training to Africa," AP, March 22, 2004.
- Jim Fisher-Thompson, "U.S.-African Partnership Helps Counter Terrorists in Sahel Region. New Maghreb cooperation central to Pan Sahel Initiative," U.S. Department of State, March 23, 2004.
- "Stripes' Q&A on DOD's Pan Sahel Initiative," Stars and Stripes (Europe), April 5, 2004: "Lisa Burgess and editor Pat Dickson sat down recently with Army Col. Vic Nelson, the Department of Defense's country director for West Africa, to talk about the Pan Sahel Initiative. Public Affairs Officer Air Force Maj. Michael Shavers sat in."
