= Cooperative security location =

A cooperative security location (CSL) is a U.S. military term for facilities used for regional training in counterterrorism and interdiction of drug trafficking, and also to provide contingency access to continental areas.

"A CSL is a host-nation facility with little or no permanent U.S. personnel presence, which may contain equipment and/or logistical arrangements and serve for security cooperation activities and contingency access." These sites were established as the Pentagon began to address regional threats primarily in Africa and Latin America following its 2004 global posture review. They are sometimes referred to as "lily pads". The establishment of such bases accelerated under the Obama administration, especially with the pivot to the Asia-Pacific region and increased operations in Africa. A CSL is not a forward operating site (FOS) with a small permanent force or contractor personnel or a main operating base (MOB), with a large force and a well-defended site. Canada has established operational support hubs that operate in a similar fashion and can be reached by Canada's fleet of C-17 cargo aircraft.

== Latin American and Caribbean CSLs ==
- Curaçao International Airport, Curaçao
- Queen Beatrix International Airport, Aruba, Cooperative Security Location of U.S. Southern Command
- Comalapa, El Salvador: Cooperative Security Location Comalapa of U.S. Southern Command located at El Salvador International Airport/Comalapa Air Base
- Manta Air Base, Ecuador (Closed)

== African CSLs ==
These sites were created while Africa was in the region covered by United States European Command. With the creation of the United States Africa Command (USAFRICOM) in 2007, these CSL locations in Africa were transferred to the new command.

They include, but are not limited to:

- Dakar, Senegal
- Entebbe, Uganda
- Libreville, Gabon
