= Main operating base =

Permanently manned, well-protected military base

Main operating base (MOB) is a term used by the United States military defined as a "permanently manned, well-protected base, used to support permanently deployed forces, and with robust sea and/or air access". This term was used to differentiate major strategic overseas military facilities versus smaller, less secure or temporarily manned contingency tactical locations such as forward operating bases, forward operating sites or cooperative security locations. The differentiation was established as the Pentagon began to address regional threats primarily in Africa, Asia and Latin America following its 2004 global posture review.

== Former MOBs in Afghanistan ==
- Kandahar International Airport, Helmand Province
- Camp Bastion, Helmand Province
- Bagram Airfield, Parwan Province
- MOB Price, Helmand Province
- MOB Lashkar Gah used to be home to the 4th Mechanized Brigade ('Black Rats') headquarters.

== See also ==
- List of established military terms
