= Trans-Saharan Counterterrorism Initiative =

The Trans-Saharan Counterterrorism Partnership (TSCTP) is an interagency plan by the United States government, combining efforts by both civil and military agencies, "to combat terrorism in Trans-Saharan Africa. The military component of TSCTI comprises the U.S. efforts of Operation Enduring Freedom - Trans Sahara. The goal of TSCTI is to counter terrorist influences in the region and assist governments to better control their territory and to prevent huge tracts of largely deserted African territory from becoming a safe haven for terrorist groups." The first partner nations in the program included Algeria, Chad, Mali, Mauritania, Morocco, Niger, Senegal, Nigeria, and Tunisia. Current membership includes eleven African countries: Algeria, Burkina Faso, Libya, Morocco, Tunisia, Chad, Mali, Mauritania, Niger, Nigeria, and Senegal. The goal of the alliance is not to fight in hot spots, but to provide preventive training and engagement with governments to help prevent the growth of terrorist organizations in the partner countries. Exercise Flintlock 2005, a joint military exercise first held in June 2005, was the first result of the new program.

The Congress approved $500 million for the TSCTI over six years to support countries involved in counterterrorism against threats of Al Qaeda operating in central African countries. In February 2007, President George W. Bush also authorized the creation of a new Africa Command to be established by September 2007, under which future African continental operations would be conducted. TSCTI followed the Pan Sahel Initiative (PSI), which began in 2002 by training soldiers from Mali, Mauritania, Niger, and Chad, and concluded operations in December 2004.

Critics of the initiative have questioned of the extent and presence of Islamic-extremist terrorism in the region and the actions and past behavior of some of the partner governments, who may be using the program to gain training, equipment, and funds in order to effectively control and repress legitimate democratic movements in member states, or to fuel wars between neighboring African countries. Similar questions were raised about the TSCTI's predecessor, the Pan Sahel Initiative.

== Transfer to Africom ==
On October 1, 2008, responsibility was transferred from the United States Central Command (CENTCOM) and the United States European Command (EUCOM) to the United States Africa Command (AFRICOM) as it assumed authority over the African theater of operations.
