= 127e programs =

American military operations under US Code Section 127e authority

- Date: 2017–2020

127e programs, also known as 127 Echo programs, refers to a number of counterterrorism operations led by United States special operations forces under the legal authority of Section 127e of Title 10 of the United States Code. According to The Intercept, at least 23 different operations were conducted by the American military under 127e authority between 2017 and 2020, costing at least $310 million.

== Legal status ==
Section 127e of Title 10 of the United States Code, titled Support of special operations to combat terrorism, allows for the United States Secretary of Defense to spend a maximum of $100 million a year to "support to foreign forces, irregular forces, groups, or individuals engaged in supporting or facilitating authorized ongoing military operations by United States special operations forces" engaged in counterterrorism activities.

== History ==
The authority originated in American government initiatives during the first few years of the war on terror, notably the Iraq War. It was originally known as Section 1208 authority, under the National Defense Authorization Act, and received funding of $10 million a year.

A number of 127e programmes have been conducted in Somalia, consisting of training regional forces for combat against Al-Shabaab. Other "direct action" missions involving direct combat with American forces have been conducted in Cameroon, Kenya, Libya, Mali, Niger, Somalia, Tunisia, Ethiopia, and Mauritania have been confirmed to have occurred by former American general Donald C. Bolduc. Operations under the authority have also been carried out in Egypt, Lebanon, Syria, and Yemen.

In 2017, the team ambushed in the Tongo Tongo ambush in Niger had been pulled off its original mission to assist another team that had been conducted a 127e operation. In 2019, the Rapid Intervention Brigade (BIR) of the Cameroon Armed Forces received American funding under 127e authority, until the programme was cut off due to accusations of human rights abuses by the BIR

On the 24th of October 2023, The Intercept would put out an article describing how the US military used 127e programme to conduct what it described as a "secret war" in Lebanon, and warned of how it could inflame the ongoing Gaza war

== Reception ==
In 2014, Admiral William H. McRaven called the programme "probably the single most important authority we have in our fight against terrorism." In 2018, General Raymond A. Thomas stated that the programme's "unique access and capabilities achieve results." According to General Richard D. Clarke, "use of 127e authority has directly resulted in the capture or killing of thousands of terrorists."

Elias Yousif of the Center for International Policy and Daniel R. Mahanty of the Center for Civilians in Conflict have concerns about a lack of formal oversight mechanisms for the programme, saying that "the DOD has exempted 127e programs from basic human rights due diligence and vetting it applies to almost all other programs" and has allowed the Pentagon to avoid "critical questions about U.S. military involvement in foreign conflicts." Katherine Ebright of the Brennan Center for Justice has said that the Pentagon has used the programmes "to engage in combat beyond the scope of any authorization for use of military force or permissible self-defense," which "would contravene constitutional principles."
