= Carter Ham =

US Army General

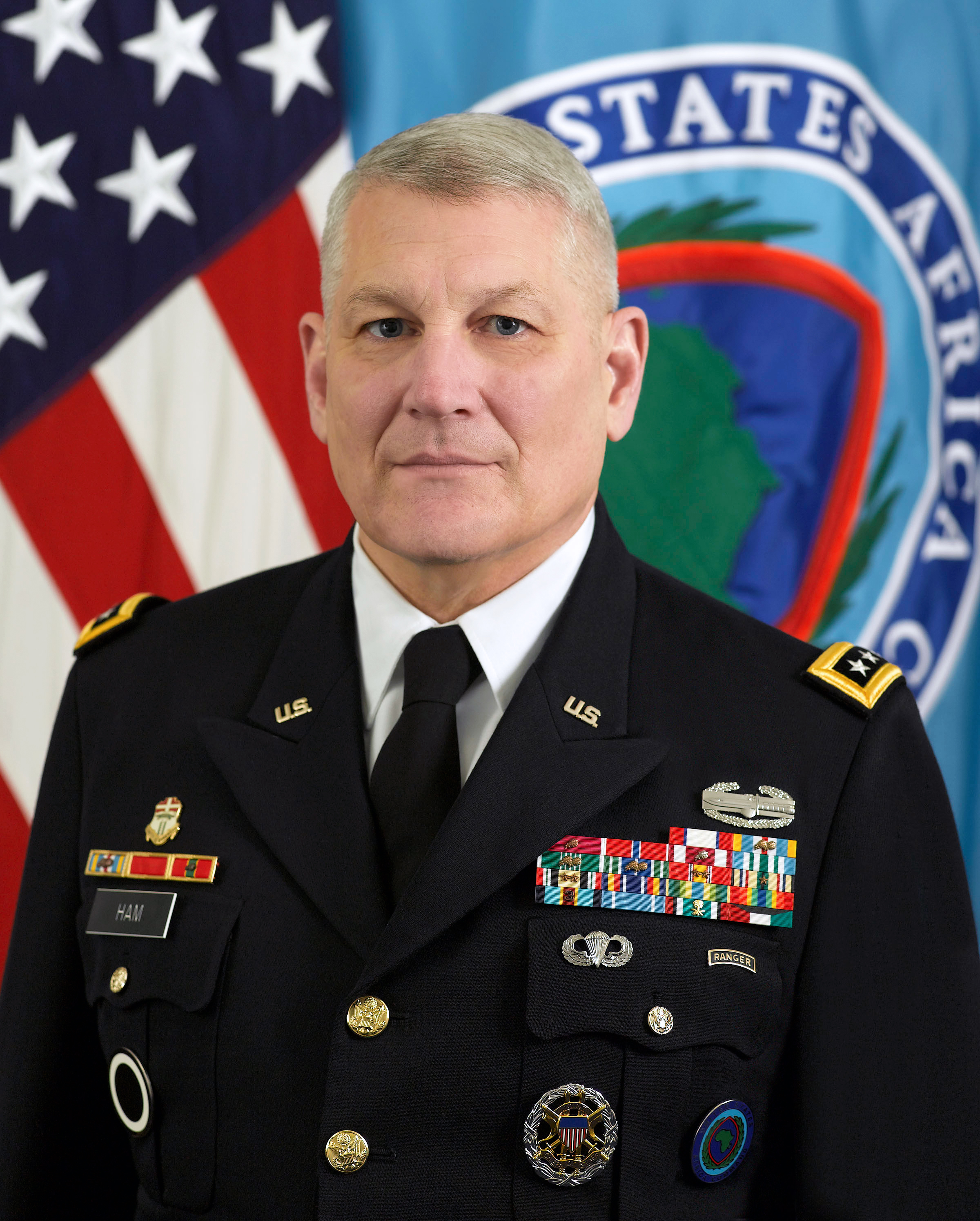
- Official portrait, 2011
- Born: 16 February 1952 (age 74); Portland, Oregon, U.S.
- Military career
- Allegiance: United States
- Branch: United States Army
- Service years: 1973–2013
- Rank: General
- Commands: United States Africa Command; United States Army Europe; 1st Infantry Division
- Conflicts: Gulf War: Operation Desert Storm; Iraq War: Operation Iraqi Freedom; First Libyan Civil War: Operation Odyssey Dawn
- Awards: Army Distinguished Service Medal (2); Defense Superior Service Medal (4); Legion of Merit (2); Bronze Star Medal

Carter Frederick Ham (born 16 February 1952) is a retired United States Army General Officer who served as the second commander of United States Africa Command. As commander of Africa Command, he led Operation Odyssey Dawn, the initial United States role in the 2011 military intervention in Libya.

Ham served as the commanding general of the United States Army Europe and Seventh Army from 28 August 2008 to 8 March 2011. Prior to that, he served as Director for Operations (J-3) at the Joint Staff from August 2007 to August 2008 and the commanding general, 1st Infantry Division from August 2006 to August 2007, and was the commander of Operation Able Sentry in Macedonia in the mid-1990s, during the Yugoslav wars.

Post-retirement, Ham served as president and CEO of the Association of the United States Army from July 2016 to September 2021.

== Early life and education ==
Ham was born on 16 February 1952, in Portland, Oregon. He attended high school at Charles F. Brush High School in Lyndhurst, Ohio, a suburb of Cleveland. He received the rank of Eagle Scout as a youth in 1965. Ham is a 1976 Distinguished Military Graduate of John Carroll University in the Cleveland suburb of University Heights, Ohio. During his military career, he achieved a Masters of Arts degree in National Security and Strategic Studies from the Naval War College, in Newport, Rhode Island. In 2012, his final full year as a U.S. Army officer, the Boy Scouts of America bestowed upon him the Distinguished Eagle Scout Award.

== Military career ==
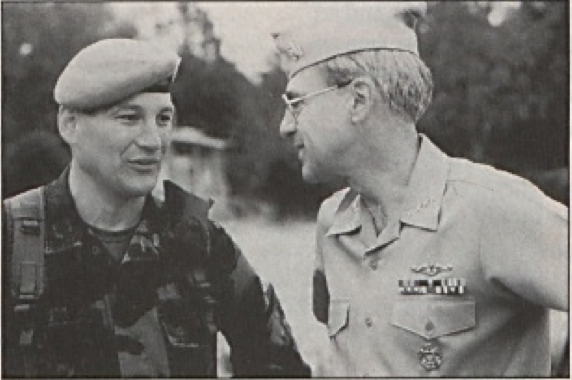
Ham as lieutenant colonel commanding U.S. forces in Camp Able Sentry, Macedonia, speaking to Admiral William Owens in 1995

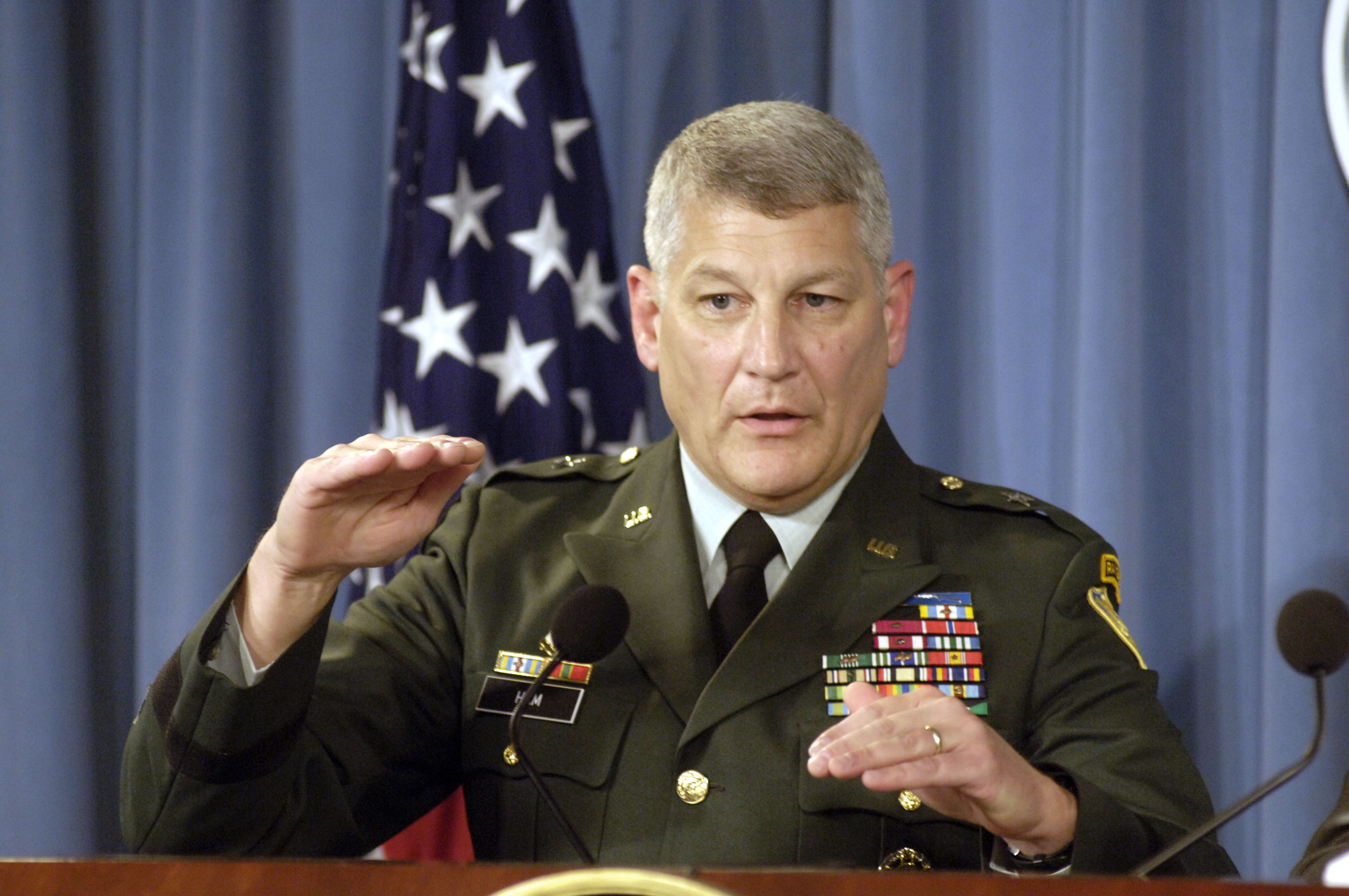
Ham speaking to reporters during a press briefing at the Pentagon in October 2005

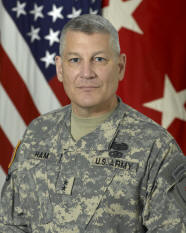
Ham in 2006

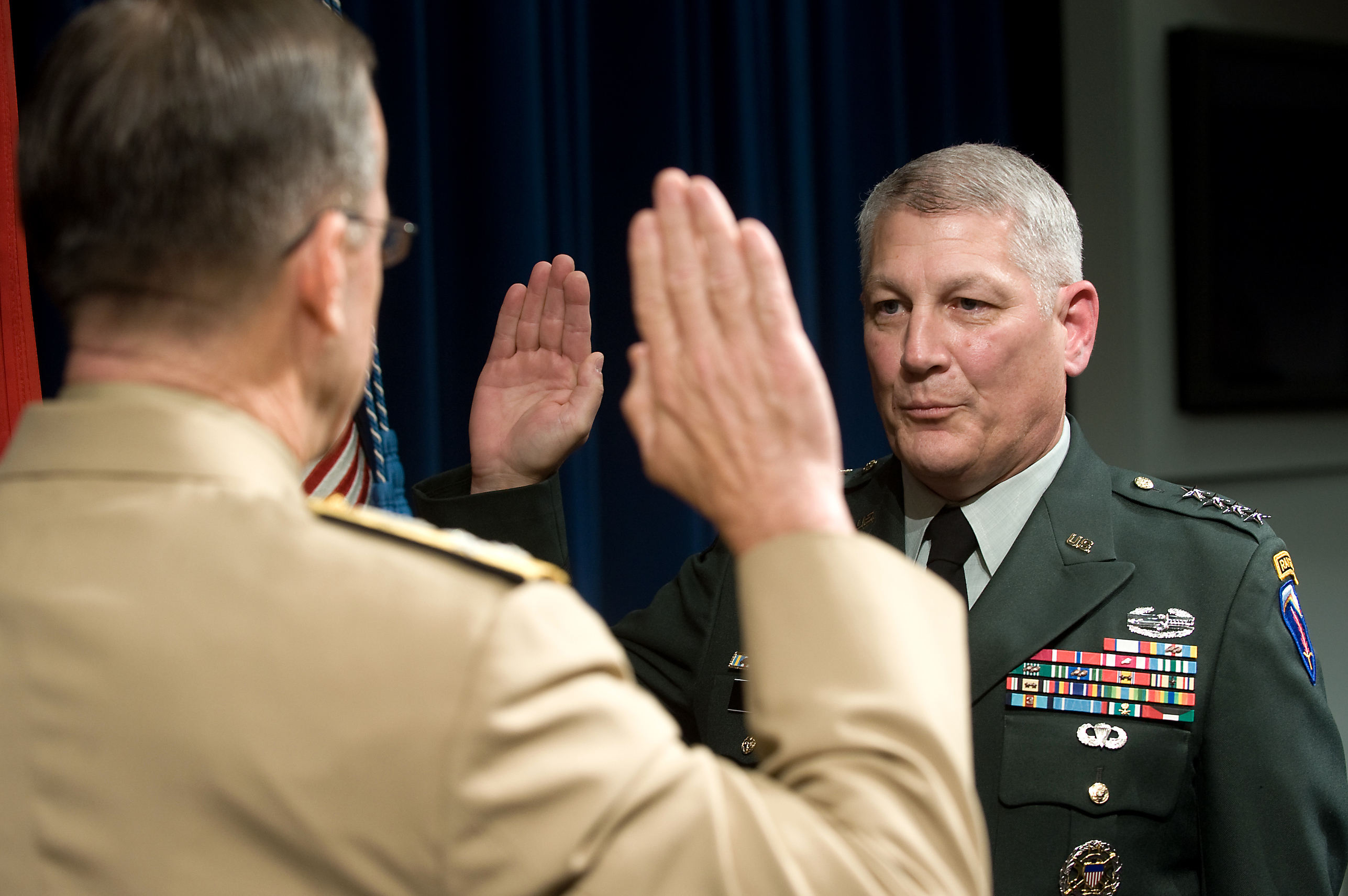
Ham being sworn in as the commander of USAREUR by Michael Mullen in August 2008

Ham enlisted in the United States Army in 1973 and served as an infantryman in the 82nd Airborne Division before being accepted in the Army Reserve Officers' Training Corps (Army ROTC) while attending John Carroll University in Cleveland, Ohio. An ROTC Distinguished Military Graduate, Ham was commissioned as an infantry officer in 1976. He later received his master's degree in National Security and Strategic Studies from the Naval War College in Newport, Rhode Island, as well as graduating from several military schools including the Infantry Officer Basic Course, the Armor Officer Advanced Course, the Naval War College's College of Naval Command and Staff, and the Air War College. He is a member of the John Carroll University ROTC Hall of Fame. He and his wife, Christi, are both John Carroll University graduates.

Ham's early assignments included service at Fort Knox, Kentucky, and tours of duty in Italy and Germany. After graduating from the Armor Officer Advanced Course, he was a Recruiting Area Commander in Lima, Ohio. In 1984, he served with a joint service unit in support of the Olympic Games in Los Angeles.

From 1984 until 1989, Ham served as Assistant Inspector General, then as Battalion Operations Officer (S-3) and Executive Officer with the Opposing Force (OPFOR) at the National Training Center, Fort Irwin, California. He attended the College of Naval Command and Staff, graduating with distinction in 1990, and was then assigned to the U.S. Army Infantry School at Fort Benning, Georgia.

Ham served a tour as an advisor with a Saudi Arabian National Guard Brigade in Riyadh as part of OPM-SANG then returned to Fort Benning, where he was the executive officer for the Infantry School. Ham commanded the 1st Battalion, 6th Infantry in Vilseck, Germany including a six-month tour with the United Nations Protection Forces in the Republic of Macedonia. Following battalion command, he was the Senior Observer/Controller of the Timberwolf Team at the Combat Maneuver Training Center, Hohenfels, Germany.

Ham graduated from the Air War College in 1997 then returned to Germany, where he served as Operations Officer (G-3), then Chief of Staff, 1st Infantry Division. From 1999 to 2001 he commanded the 29th Infantry Regiment at Fort Benning, then served as deputy director for Resources and Analysis (J-8) for United States Central Command at MacDill AFB in Tampa, Florida and in Doha, Qatar, during which time he was selected for promotion to brigadier general. Ham was assigned as the deputy commanding general for training and readiness, I Corps at Fort Lewis, Washington in August 2003. In January 2004, he assumed command of Multinational Brigade (Task Force Olympia) – North in Mosul, Iraq serving there until February 2005. During his time in Iraq, Ham suffered from post-traumatic stress disorder, which was caused by his attending the aftermath of a deadly suicide bombing at a mess hall. He later sought treatment for his condition and publicly encouraged other soldiers to do the same.

Returning from Iraq, Ham served as the deputy director for regional operations, J-3, on The Joint Staff. Ham assumed command of the 1st Infantry Division at Fort Riley, Kansas, in August 2006 and served as the commanding general until July 2007, returning to The Joint Staff as director for operations, J-3. On 28 August 2008, Ham became the 34th Commanding General of the United States Army Europe headquartered at Campbell Barracks, Heidelberg, Germany. In 2010, Ham served as co-chair for the comprehensive review of issues associated with the repeal of the "Don't ask, don't tell" policy.

The United States Senate, confirmed Ham's nomination to become the next Commanding General of United States Africa Command, headquartered at Kelley Barracks, Stuttgart, Germany, in November 2010. He assumed the post on 8 March 2011.

Ham was in command of United States forces enforcing the Libyan no-fly zone, along with Admiral Samuel J. Locklear. Described as "in charge of the coalition effort", Ham on 21 March 2011, said, "there would be coalition airstrikes on Colonel Qaddafi's mobile air defenses and that some 80 sorties – only half of them by the United States – had been flown on Monday." Admiral Locklear, aboard the flagship Mount Whitney, had tactical command of the Operation Odyssey Dawn joint taskforce. Ham also said he had "full authority to attack the regime's forces if they refused to comply with President Barack Obama's demands that they pull back from Ajdabiya, Misrata and Zawiya," according to one report. Earlier, he said that the United States was not working with the Libyan rebels. "Our mission is not to support any opposition forces," Ham said by video feed to the Pentagon from his headquarters in Stuttgart.

Ham was in overall command of military forces when the 11 September 2012, terrorist attacks were launched on the American consulate and CIA annex in Benghazi, Libya. According to his June 2013 Congressional testimony, Ham chose not to deploy close air support during the attack, based on a lack of situational awareness about the circumstances on the ground. He denied the allegation by some Republicans that President Barack Obama or others in Obama's administration had ordered him to "stand down" a planned rescue mission that was ready to deploy.

After a 24-month tour of duty as Commander Africa Command, Ham was succeeded by General David M. Rodriguez. General Ham retired in June 2013.

=== Views ===
Ham was quoted in an online Washington Post article by Greg Miller and Craig Whitlock, posted on 1 October 2012, that, as saying, that, as a result of al-Qaeda in the Islamic Maghreb's overtaking and capturing more territory in Mali in Africa, and possessing arms from Libya after the Libyan Civil War which overthrew Muammar Gaddafi, there is the possibility of the U.S. assisting, but not leading, counterterrorism operations done by other countries. A more radical step would be the use of drones.

While speaking in December 2012 at Chatham House, Ham said while he would not characterize the U.S.-China relationship in Africa as adversarial, the two countries had taken different approaches to the continent. The United States focused on investment in human capital while China focused on infrastructure development.

== Post-retirement ==
In 2015, Ham was elected chairman of the National Commission on the Future of the Army, an eight-member panel tasked with making recommendations on the size, force structure and capabilities of the Army. The committee was disbanded soon after publishing its findings on 28 January 2016.

Ham became an executive vice president of the Association of the United States Army (AUSA) in February 2016. He succeeded Gordon R. Sullivan as president and CEO of AUSA on 1 July 2016. He relinquished the presidency to Robert Brooks Brown on 30 September 2021.

== Dates of rank ==
Second lieutenant (O-1)*	First lieutenant (O-2)*	Captain (O-3)*	Major (O-4)*	Lieutenant colonel (O-5)*
2 June 1976	2 June 1978	1 August 1980	1 June 1987	1 September 1992

Colonel (O-6)*	Brigadier general (O-7)*	Major general (O-8)*	Lieutenant general (O-9*)	General (O-10)*
1 April 1998	1 October 2003	1 February 2005	1 August 2007	1 August 2008

Note:
* The O-1, etc. designates the pay grade.

== Major duty assignments ==
Training officer, II Reserve Officer Training Corps Region, 4th Basic Combat Training Brigade	1976
Section leader, Combat Support Company, 1st Battalion, 509th Infantry (Airborne Combat Team)	1977–1978
S-1 (Personnel), 2d Battalion, 22d Infantry, 4th Infantry Division	1978–1979
Commander, C Company, 2d Battalion, 22d Infantry, 8th Infantry Division	1979–1981
Student, Armor Officer Advanced Course	1981–1982
Lima area commander, Columbus District Recruiting Command	1982–1984
Detachment commander, Forward Military Support Element, 1984 Summer Olympics	1984
Assistant inspector general, National Training Center	1984–1986
S-3 (Air), 6th Battalion (Mechanized), 31st Infantry	1986–1987
Executive officer, 1st Battalion (Mechanized), 52d Infantry	1987–1989
Student, College of Naval Command and Staff, U.S. Naval War College	1989–1990
Executive officer, United States Army Infantry School	1990–1993
Commander, 1st Battalion, 6th Infantry, 3d Infantry Division	1993–1995
Senior task force observer/controller, Operations Group, Combat Maneuver Training Center	1995–1996
Student, United States Air Force Air War College	1996–1997
Chief of staff, 1st Infantry Division	1997–1999
Commander, Infantry Training Support Brigade, 29th Infantry Regiment	1999–2001
Deputy director, J-8, United States Central Command	2001–2003
Deputy commanding general for training and readiness, U.S. I Corps	2003–2004
Commander, MNB North (Task Force Olympia) (Mosul, Iraq)	2004–2005
Deputy director for regional operations, J-3, The Joint Staff	2005–2006
Commander, 1st Infantry Division	2006–2007
Director for operations (J-3), The Joint Staff	2007–2008
Commanding general, United States Army Europe and Seventh Army	2008–2011
Commander, United States Africa Command	2011–2013

== Decorations and badges ==
Army Distinguished Service Medal (with one bronze oak leaf cluster)
Defense Superior Service Medal (with three oak leaf clusters)
Legion of Merit (with oak leaf cluster)
Bronze Star Medal
Meritorious Service Medal (with silver oak leaf cluster)
Joint Service Commendation Medal
Army Commendation Medal (with two oak leaf clusters)
Army Achievement Medal (with two oak leaf clusters)
Joint Meritorious Unit Award (with two oak leaf clusters)
Meritorious Unit Commendation
Superior Unit Award (with oak leaf cluster)
National Defense Service Medal (with two bronze service stars)
Southwest Asia Service Medal (with service star)
Iraq Campaign Medal (with two service stars)
Global War on Terrorism Service Medal
Armed Forces Service Medal
Army Service Ribbon
Overseas Service Ribbon (with bronze award numeral 3)
United Nations Medal
NATO Medal for the former Yugoslavia
Polish Army Medal in Gold
Kuwait Liberation Medal (Saudi Arabia)
Kuwait Liberation Medal (Kuwait)

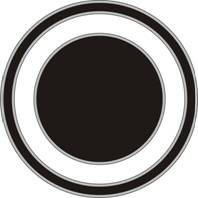
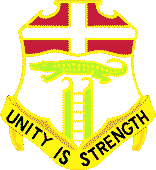
Combat Action Badge
Expert Infantryman Badge
Basic Parachutist Badge
Ranger Tab
Joint Chiefs of Staff Identification Badge
United States Africa Command Badge
I Corps Combat Service Identification Badge
6th US Infantry Regiment Distinctive Unit Insignia
4 Overseas Service Bars.
