= Forward operating site =

Type of United States military facility

A forward operating site (FOS) or forward operating location (FOL) is a U.S. military term for facilities, defined as "a scalable, 'warm' facility that can support sustained operations, but with only a small permanent presence of support or contractor personnel as opposed to a FOB or MOB. A FOS will host occasional rotational forces and many contain pre-positioned equipment." These sites were established as the Pentagon began to address regional threats primarily in Africa and Latin America following its 2004 global posture review.

An FOS is differentiated from a cooperative security location (CSL) with no permanent force or contractor personnel, or a forward operating base (FOB) and main operating base (MOB), with a large force and a well-defended site.

== Locations ==
They include, but are not limited to the following locations:

=== Asia ===
- Paya Lebar Airfield, Singapore

=== Caribbean ===
- Curaçao International Airport, Curaçao, Kingdom of the Netherlands
- Queen Beatrix International Airport, Aruba, Kingdom of the Netherlands

=== Central America ===
- Soto Cano AB, Honduras

=== Europe ===
- RAF Fairford, United Kingdom
- Bulgaria, see List of joint US-Bulgarian military bases
- Mihail Kogălniceanu Air Base, Romania

=== Africa ===
- Camp Lemonnier, Djibouti
- Morocco
- Tunisia

== See also ==
- Loss of Strength Gradient
- Forward operating base (FOB)
- Naval outlying landing field
- Satellite airfield
- List of established military terms
