= Peter Vasely =

Retired American admiral (born 1967)

Peter G. Vasely
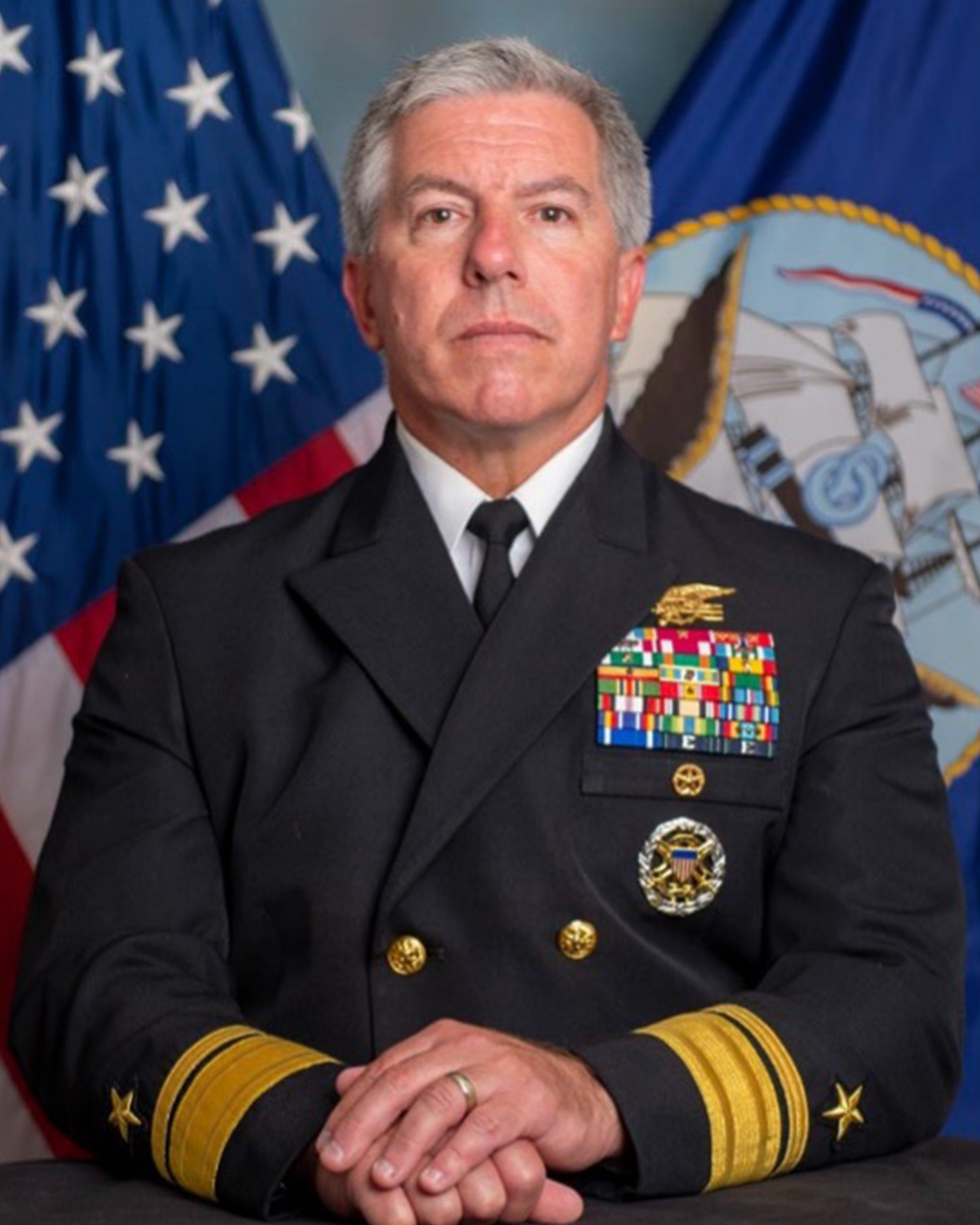
- Official portrait, 2023
- Born: 1967 (age 58–59)
- Military career
- Allegiance: United States
- Branch: United States Navy
- Service years: 1990–2024
- Rank: Rear Admiral
- Commands: U.S. Forces Afghanistan Forward; Special Operations Joint Task Force–Afghanistan; Naval Special Warfare Group 2 Naval Special Warfare Tactical Development Squadron 2
- Conflicts: War in Afghanistan; Iraq War
- Awards: Defense Superior Service Medal (2); Legion of Merit (2); Bronze Star Medal (4)

Peter Gerard Vasely (born 1967) is a retired American rear admiral. He was notably the commander of United States Forces Afghanistan Forward in 2021, during the Taliban offensive that led to the fall of the Islamic Republic of Afghanistan, and oversaw the international evacuation from Kabul.

Vasely was raised in California and graduated from the United States Naval Academy in 1990. He became a Navy SEAL officer and served in SEAL Team One and the Development Group (SEAL Team Six). During that time he was deployed for the War in Afghanistan and the Iraq War. He later served as the director of operations of the Defense Intelligence Agency from 2019 to 2021. After that, in May 2021 he became the commander of Special Operations Joint Task Force–Afghanistan and NATO Special Operations Component Command–Afghanistan. In July 2021 Vasely also became the commander of U.S. Forces Afghanistan Forward.

After the evacuation from Afghanistan, he served as a special assistant to the director of the Navy Staff from November 2021 to June 2022, and last served as the deputy director for future joint force development of the Joint Staff from 2022 to 2024.

== Early life and family ==
Peter Gerard Vasely was born in 1967. Raised in Coronado, California, Vasely graduated from Coronado High School in 1985. He then attended the Northfield Mt. Hermon Prep School, graduating in 1986, before entering the United States Naval Academy.

Vasely is the son of Edward J. Vasely (born 22 February 1925) and Jean Frances (Cahill) Vasely (7 December 1927 – 4 June 2018). His father served in the United States Coast Guard during World War II. Vasely married Deanne Maree Clarke on January 21, 2000 in Escambia County, Florida. They have a son and a daughter.

== Military career ==
Vasely earned a Bachelor of Science degree in general engineering from the Naval Academy in 1990 and received a commission as an ensign in the United States Navy. He volunteered for Basic Underwater Demolition/SEAL training, graduating with BUD/S class 172 in February 1991. His first operational assignment was with SEAL Team One in at Naval Amphibious Base Coronado.

Following SEAL Tactical Training (STT) and completion of six month probationary period, Vasely received the 1130 designator as a Naval Special Warfare Officer, entitled to wear the Special Warfare insignia also known as "SEAL Trident". Vasely served as assistant platoon commander and platoon commander during deployments to Southeast Asia with SEAL Team One. In 1995, Vasely volunteered for assignment to Naval Special Warfare Development Group in Damneck, Virginia, and completed a specialized selection and training course. He then served with the command until 1998, during which he planned, rehearsed and operated during classified operations. Vasely served as executive officer with Special Boat Unit 22 from 1998 to 2000, followed by a tour with Joint Special Operations Command (JSOC) as an operations officer from 2000 to 2002. Vasely returned to Naval Special Warfare Development Group in August 2002 as squadron commander till 2005, completing deployments to Afghanistan during Operation Enduring Freedom. He later received an M.S. degree in joint warfighting and strategic studies from the Joint Advanced Warfighting School.

Vasely's later assignments included as commander of Naval Special Warfare Tactical Development Squadron Two, from 2006 to 2008. In that role he had multiple combat deployments during the Iraq War and the War in Afghanistan. Vasely was the branch chief and operations officer at the Joint Staff/deputy director for special operations (137-DDSO) from 2009 to 2011. As the deputy commanding officer of the Naval Special Warfare Development Group (SEAL Team Six), from 2011 to 2013, he led joint task forces in the Arabian Peninsula and the Horn of Africa region. Vasely was then deputy director for Operations at JSOC, and director of operations at JSOC. As a captain, he served as the commander of Naval Special Warfare Group Two from 2016 to 2018, where he organized, equipped, deployed, and sustained NSW forces in support of theater special operations commands in AFRICOM, EUCOM, SOUTHCOM, and CENTCOM. From 2018 to 2019, Vasely was second-in-command to the deputy commanding general (operations) of U.S. Forces Afghanistan.

=== Command in Afghanistan ===
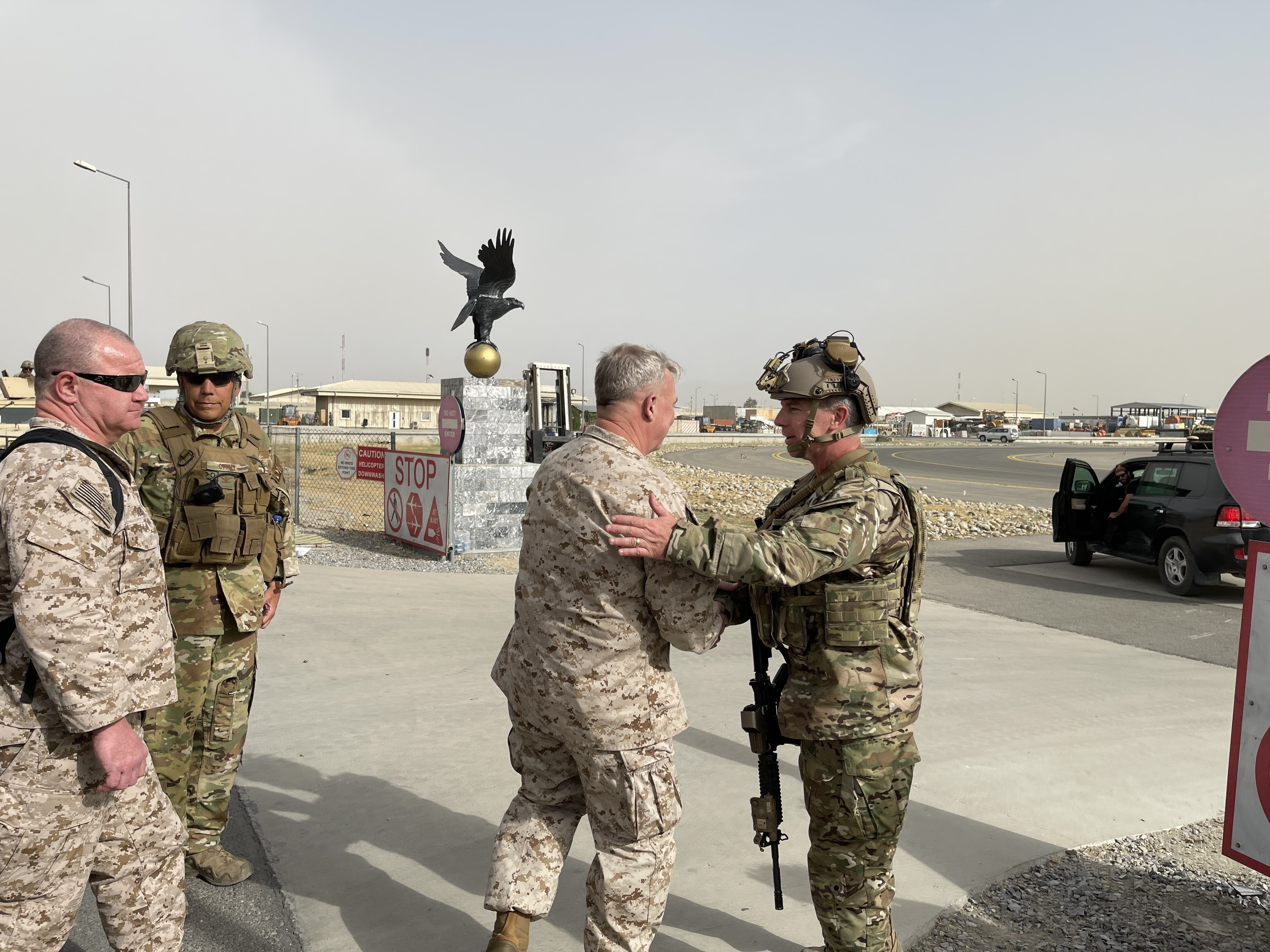
Vasely greeting CENTCOM commander Frank McKenzie Jr. at Hamid Karzai International Airport, Kabul, on 17 August 2021.

Vaseley was later the director of operations of the Defense Intelligence Agency starting in November 2019, before he served as the commander of Special Operations Joint Task Force–Afghanistan and NATO Special Operations Component Command–Afghanistan, from 17 May to 31 August 2021. He was promoted to his current rank on April 1, 2021.

Vasely was assigned to command U.S. Forces Afghanistan Forward in July 2021, when General Austin S. Miller stepped down as commander of U.S. Forces Afghanistan, which had been mostly withdrawn from the country. General Frank McKenzie Jr. of U.S. Central Command presided the rest of the evacuation while Vasely led the less than 1,000 troops still remaining inside Afghanistan. Vasely's new command, Afghanistan Forward, was initially based at the U.S. Embassy in Kabul, before Vasely later went to the Hamid Karzai International Airport.

Vasely was in charge of the August 2021 U.S. and international evacuation at the Hamid Karzai International Airport. During the evacuation he spoke to Taliban commanders almost every day, in order to arrange for U.S. troops and their Afghan allies to reach Kabul's airport. Lt. Gen. Haibatullah Alizai, the last head of the Afghan National Army, told Vasely about his plan to declare martial law and hold Kabul until 2024 using several thousand remaining Afghan troops, but Vasely did not believe it was possible.

Vasely was the commander of U.S. Forces Afghanistan Forward until October. He then served as a special assistant to the Director of the Navy Staff from 4 November 2021 to 3 June 2022. In 2022 he was assigned as deputy director for joint training of the Joint Staff, serving until his retirement in 2024.

== Awards and decorations ==
Vasely's personal awards and decorations include the Defense Superior Service Medal (two awards), Legion of Merit (two awards), Bronze Star Medal with "V" distinguishing device (four awards), Defense Meritorious Service Medal (three awards), the Meritorious Service Medal, Joint Service Commendation Medal (three awards), Navy and Marine Corps Commendation Medal (two awards), Navy and Marine Corps Achievement Medal, Presidential Unit Citation (two awards), and various campaign, unit, and service awards.

Military offices
| Preceded by ??? | Director for Operations of the Defense Intelligence Agency; 202?–2021 | Succeeded by Michelle A. Schmidt |
| Preceded by Marcus S. Evans | Commander of the NATO Special Operations Component Command–Afghanistan and Special Operations Joint Task Force–Afghanistan; 2021 | Commands disestablished |
| Preceded by Austin S. Miller as Commander, U.S. Forces Afghanistan | Commander of United States Forces Afghanistan – Forward; 2021 | Commands disestablished |
| Preceded by Stephen F. Jost | Deputy Director for Joint Training of the Joint Staff; 2022–2024 | Succeeded by Eric J. Anduze |
