= Marcus S. Evans =

U.S. Army general

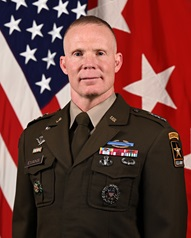
- Official portrait, 2025
- Born: 1970 (age 55–56); Dalton, Georgia, U.S.
- Military career
- Allegiance: United States
- Branch: United States Army
- Service years: 1994–present
- Rank: Lieutenant General
- Commands: 25th Infantry Division; Special Operations Joint Task Force-Afghanistan; 75th Ranger Regiment; 3rd Ranger Battalion
- Conflicts: War in Afghanistan; Iraq War
- Awards: Defense Superior Service Medal (2); Legion of Merit; Bronze Star Medal (5)

Marcus S. Evans (born 1970) is a United States Army lieutenant general who has been the 59th Director of the Army Staff since 2025. He most recently served as commanding general of the 25th Infantry Division from 2023 to 2025, and before that as chief of staff of the United States Special Operations Command from 2021 to 2024. He was also the commander of NATO Special Operations Component Command–Afghanistan and Special Operations Joint Task Force–Afghanistan.

In July 2025, Evans was nominated for promotion to lieutenant general and assignment as director of the Army Staff.

Military offices
Preceded by David M. Hamilton	Deputy Commanding General (Support) of the 3rd Infantry Division (United States); 2018–2019	Succeeded by Larry Q. Burris Jr.
Preceded by Christopher T. Donahue	Deputy Director of Special Operations and Counterterrorism of the Joint Staff; 2019–2020	Succeeded by Jeromy B. Williams
Preceded by Christopher T. Donahue	Commander of the NATO Special Operations Component Command–Afghanistan and Special Operations Joint Task Force–Afghanistan; 2020–2021	Succeeded by Peter Vasely
Preceded by Collin P. Green	Chief of Staff of the United States Special Operations Command; 2021–2023	Succeeded by Milton J. Sands III
Preceded by Joseph A. Ryan	Commanding General of the 25th Infantry Division; 2023–2025	Succeeded by James B. Bartholomees III
Preceded by Laura A. Potter	Director of the Army Staff; 2025–present	Incumbent
