= Anthony Hale =

Anthony Hale may refer to:

- Tony Hale (born 1970), American actor and comedian
- Anthony R. Hale, United States Army general
