= John M. Custer III =

United States Army general

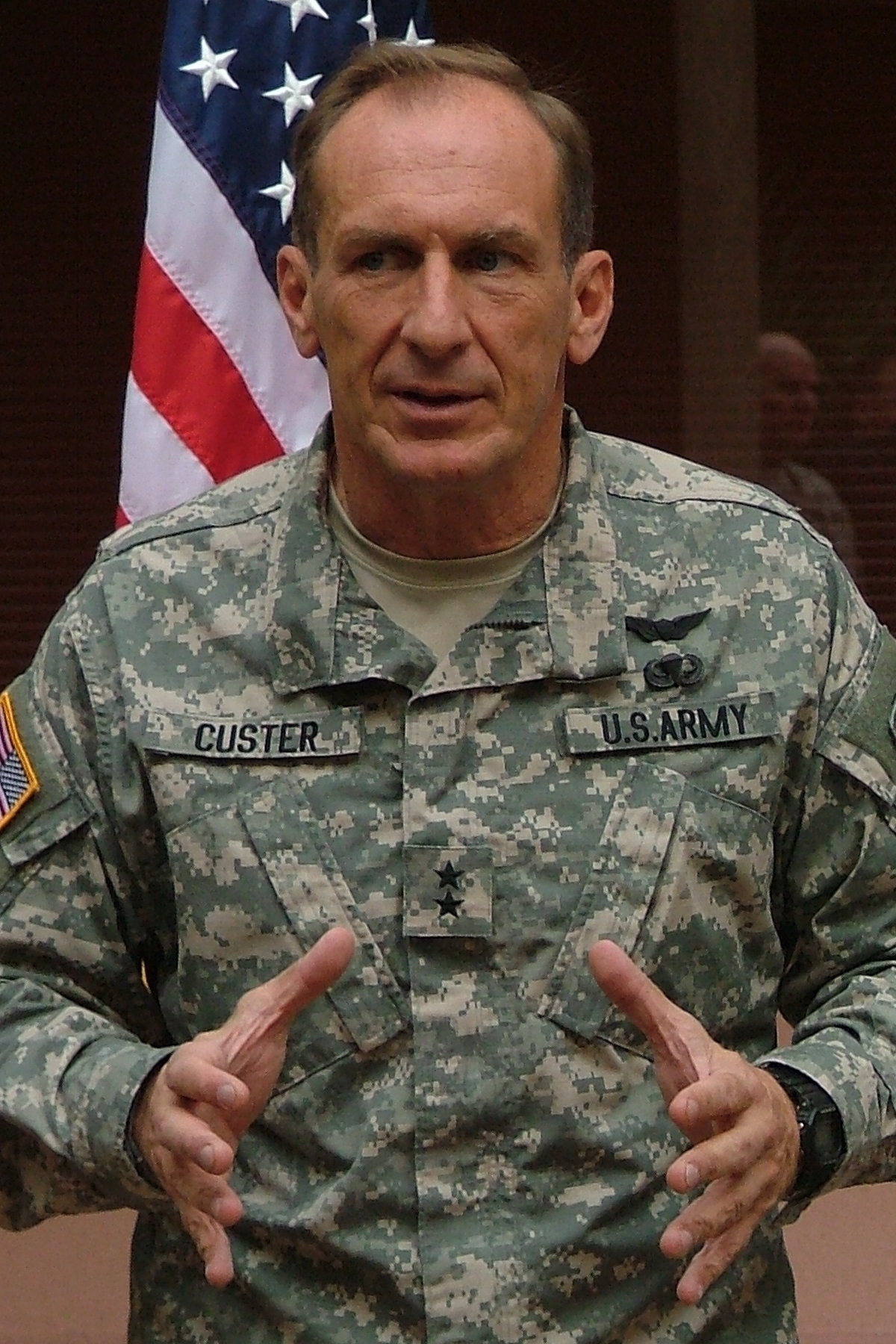
John Custer in 2007

Major General John M. Custer III was a United States Army officer. He was the Commanding General, United States Army Intelligence Center and Fort Huachuca.

== Biography ==
Custer is a native of Pennsylvania and a graduate of the University of Delaware.

In 1978 he was commissioned a second lieutenant in the Military Intelligence Corps. Custer has commanded at every level to include company, battalion and brigade, and served as the primary intelligence staff officer (S2/G2/J2) at battalion, brigade, division, corps and joint command levels. His previous assignments include Joint Chiefs of Staff (J5, Nuclear Forces Analysis) as a space architecture planner, and duty as an intelligence officer and nuclear weapons targeting officer aboard the Supreme Allied Commander Europe (SACEUR) Airborne Command Post (Silk Purse Control Group) Royal Air Force Mildenhall, England. He commanded a surveillance company on the Demilitarized Zone, Republic of Korea, a signals intelligence battalion at the National Security Agency (NSA), Fort Meade, Maryland, and the 201st Military Intelligence Brigade, First US Corps, Fort Lewis, Washington. Custer has served as a company grade assignments officer at Military Intelligence Branch, US Army Military Personnel Center, Alexandria, Virginia, and as assistant commandant, United States Army Intelligence Center and School, Fort Huachuca, Arizona. Custer was married to the former Audrey Schoenfeld and has one daughter. He was assigned as the director of intelligence (J2) Headquarters on Fort Huachuca, Arizona, until departure in 2010. Custer retired in 2011 and worked for EMC2 and DELL.

== Awards ==
Custer's awards include the Defense Superior Service Medal, the Legion of Merit with two Oak Leaf Clusters; Defense Meritorious Service Medal with Oak Leaf Cluster; Meritorious Service Medal with four Oak Leaf Clusters; Humanitarian Service Medal with Oak Leaf Cluster; Ranger Tab and Airborne Badge. His military education includes the Post-Graduate Intelligence Program at the Joint Military Intelligence College and a Master of Science degree in information operations from the National Defense University. He is a graduate of the Defense Language Institute's Russian curriculum, the Command and General Staff College at Fort Leavenworth, Kansas, and the National War College, Fort McNair, Washington, D.C.

== Public comment ==
In a major review of the nation's intelligence community, "Top Secret America," the Washington Post reported in 2010:

When ... Custer was the director of intelligence at U.S. Central Command, he grew angry at how little helpful information came out of the NCTC. In 2007, he visited its director at the time, retired Vice Adm. John Scott Redd, to tell him so. "I told him that after 4½ years, this organization had never produced one shred of information that helped me prosecute three wars!" he said loudly, leaning over the table during an interview.

Two years later, Custer ... still gets red-faced recalling that day, which reminds him of his frustration with Washington's bureaucracy. "Who has the mission of reducing redundancy and ensuring everybody doesn't gravitate to the lowest-hanging fruit?" he said. "Who orchestrates what is produced so that everybody doesn't produce the same thing?"
