= Austin S. Miller =

Retired US Army general (born 1961)

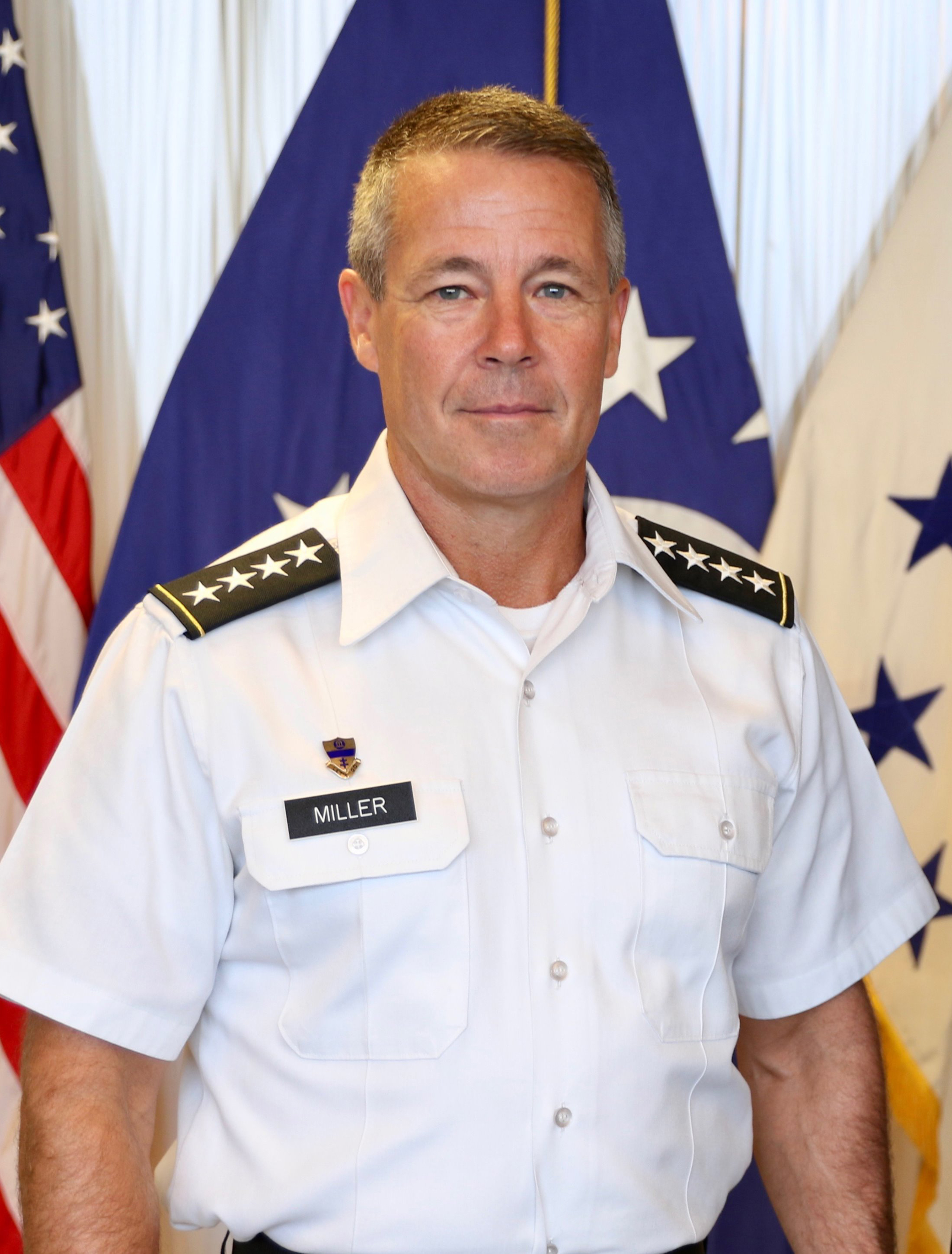
- Miller in 2018
- Born: 15 May 1961 (age 65); Honolulu, Hawaii, U.S.
- Education: United States Military Academy
- Military career
- Allegiance: United States
- Branch: United States Army
- Service years: 1983–2021
- Rank: General
- Nickname: "Scott"
- Commands: Resolute Support Mission, U.S. Forces in Afghanistan; Joint Special Operations Command; United States Army Maneuver Center of Excellence; Special Operations Joint Task Force – Afghanistan; 1st Special Forces Operational Detachment - Delta
- Conflicts: Operation Gothic Serpent: Battle of Mogadishu; Iraq War; War in Afghanistan
- Awards: Defense Distinguished Service Medal; Army Distinguished Service Medal; Silver Star; Defense Superior Service Medal (2); Legion of Merit

Austin Scott Miller (born 15 May 1961) is a retired four-star general in the United States Army and former Delta Force commander who served as the final commander of NATO's Resolute Support Mission and United States Forces – Afghanistan from 2 September 2018 to 12 July 2021. He previously served as the commander of Joint Special Operations Command from 30 March 2016 to August 2018. He participated in numerous combat operations, such as the Battle of Mogadishu in 1993, and, since 2001, the wars in Iraq and Afghanistan. He retired from the Army in December after relinquishing command in July 2021. Miller currently serves on the board of advisors for Striveworks and the board of directors for Workhorse.

== Early life and education ==
Miller was born in Honolulu, Hawaii, on 15 May 1961. He graduated from the United States Military Academy in 1983 and was commissioned as an infantry officer in the United States Army.

== Military career ==
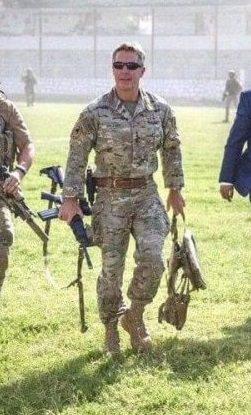
General Austin S. Miller

Miller was commissioned as a second lieutenant in 1983 into the Infantry Branch after graduation from United States Military Academy at West Point. After completing Ranger School where he graduated as the Distinguished Honor Graduate of his class, he was assigned a platoon in 3rd Battalion, 325th Infantry (Airborne), 82nd Airborne Division. Afterward, he was a platoon leader with A Company, 2nd Ranger Battalion, 75th Ranger Regiment from January 1986 to May 1987. He completed Infantry Officer Advanced Course in June 1989. He was assigned to South Korea as a Company Commander with 5th Battalion, 20th Infantry (Mechanized), 2nd Infantry Division, Eighth United States Army. Later, he was an instructor at the Special Operations Division School of the Americas at Fort Benning, Georgia from April 1991 to April 1992.

In 1992, Miller completed a specialized selection course and operator training course for assignment to 1st Special Forces Operational Detachment – Delta (1st SFOD-D), or Delta Force at Fort Bragg, North Carolina, where he held numerous leadership positions including squadron operations officer, troop commander, operational support troop commander, selection and training commander, A Squadron commander, as well as deputy commander and unit commanding officer from 2005 to 2007.

He participated in numerous combat operations during Operation Gothic Serpent in Somalia, Operation Joint Endeavor in Bosnia, Operation Enduring Freedom and Operation Iraqi Freedom. In October 1993, Miller was the ground force commander during the Battle of Mogadishu while Lieutenant Colonel Gary L. Harrell held operational command of C Squadron, 1st SFOD-D. Miller graduated from United States Army Command and General Staff College in June 1997. He is a graduate of the United States Marine Corps War College, 2003 and Joint and Combined Warfighting School.

As a colonel, Miller received an assignment as director of the Interagency Task Force, United States Special Operations Command, MacDill Air Force Base, Florida from August 2007 to June 2008. He was assigned deputy director for Special Operations, J-37, The Joint Staff, Washington, D.C. till 2009. From September 2011 through August 2012, Miller was special assistant to the Director of the Joint Improvised Explosive Device Defeat Organization in Arlington, Virginia.

He was a special assistant to the deputy commanding general, United States Special Operations Command in Washington D.C. from August 2012 through June 2013. From June 2013 to June 2014, Miller was commanding general of the Combined Forces Special Operations Component Command in Afghanistan, or CFSOCC-A, responsible for employment and coordination of special operations forces and assets to achieve NATO and US military objectives. In 2014, he became commanding general of the United States Army Maneuver Center of Excellence at Fort Benning. From 2016 to 2018, Miller served as the commanding general of the Joint Special Operations Command.

=== Commander of U.S. and NATO forces in Afghanistan ===
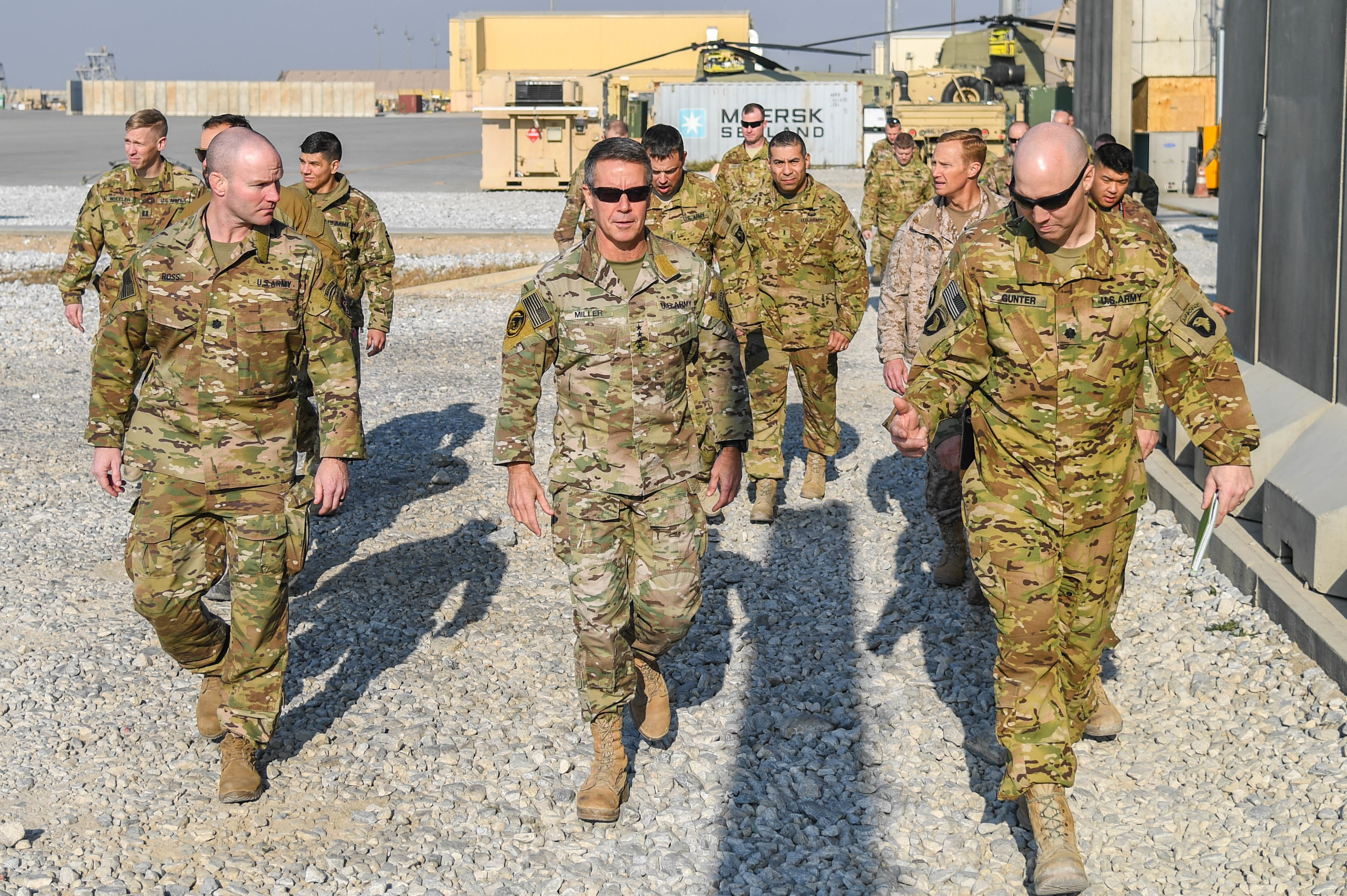
General Miller (center) visiting Combat Aviation Brigade, 101st Airborne Division at Bagram Airfield in Afghanistan on 23 December 2018

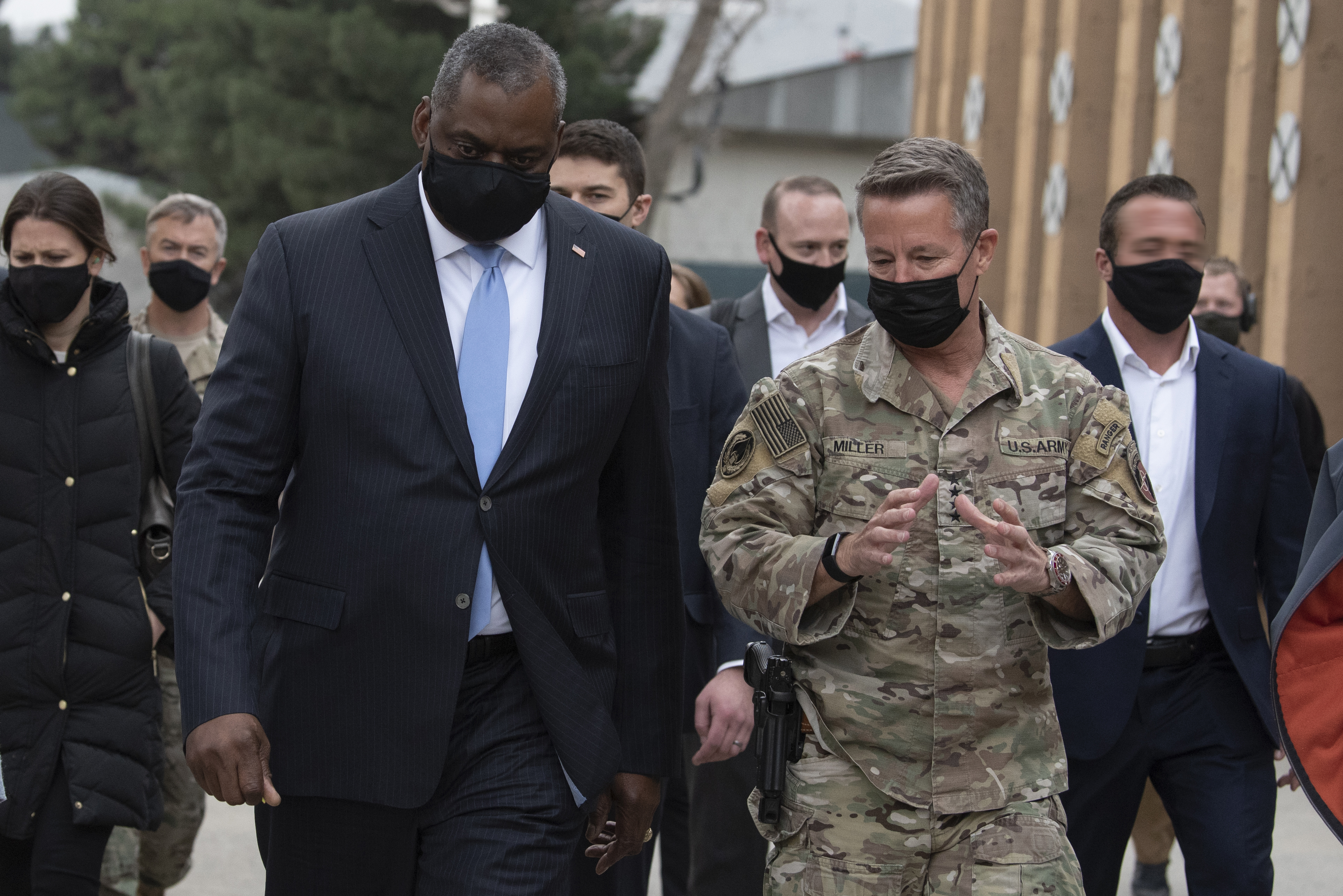
Gen. Miller alongside Secretary of Defense Lloyd Austin in Afghanistan, March 2021.

In 2018, he assumed command of United States Forces — Afghanistan and NATO's Resolute Support mission, after a successful June 2018 visit to the Senate Armed Services Committee.

On 18 October 2018, Miller was in the room at the governor's compound in southern Kandahar when a Taliban gunman fatally shot provincial police chief Abdul Raziq. Miller was not harmed, but drew his sidearm during the shooting, waited until the wounded were attended to, then flew out with the casualties afterward which included Brigadier General Jeffrey Smiley, who was wounded in the attack.

On 1 July 2021, Miller gave an exclusive on-camera interview to ABC, with a helicopter flyover of the Bagram Air Base to emphasize its emptiness.

Miller officially furled the mission flag and marked the symbolic end to Operation Resolute Support on 12 July 2021. After Bagram, the largest U.S. base in Afghanistan, was vacated, parts of the base were looted as the Americans did not inform the Afghan district administrator Darwaish Raufi of their departure. Miller was quoted as saying, "A civil war is certainly a path that can be visualized if this continues on the trajectory it's on right now, that should be of concern to the world." In a short farewell ceremony attended by many senior Afghan officials, Miller pledged that "the people of Afghanistan will be in my heart, and on my mind, for the rest of my life." On 14 July 2021, he met with President Joe Biden who thanked him for his service and his "extraordinary service in Afghanistan."

Miller testified before the Senate Armed Services Committee on 15 September 2021 on the Biden administration's decision to withdraw from Afghanistan, asserting he had recommended not all U.S. forces be immediately withdrawn.

His retirement in the grade of General was officially approved by Congress on 8 December 2021. Post-retirement, General Miller serves as a Senior Fellow for the Combating Terrorism Center at West Point. He also serves as an official ambassador for the Shields and Stripes Foundation, which supports military veterans and first responders.

== Scams using Miller's name and image ==
Miller's name and image are frequently used to set up fake social media accounts to defraud people, especially elderly women in so-called "romance scams." U.S. Forces-Afghanistan has reported almost 900 fake accounts posing as Miller on sites like Twitter, Facebook and Instagram just during the first few months of 2021. The accounts are largely used to trick people out of money and items like gift cards and cellphones, USFOR-A warned. "Gen. Miller does NOT use public accounts on social media. Scammers are using his likeness & photos," USFOR-A spokesman Col. Sonny Leggett said in a tweet. Anyone wishing to report a fake Miller account should contact USFOR-A.

== Dates of rank ==
Rank	Date
Second lieutenant	25 May 1983
First lieutenant	24 November 1984
Captain	1 May 1987
Major	1 December 1994
Lieutenant colonel	1 June 1999
Colonel	1 May 2004
Brigadier general	15 June 2009
Major general	2 June 2012
Lieutenant general	24 March 2016
General	2 September 2018

== Awards and decorations ==
Combat Infantryman Badge with Star (denoting 2nd award)
Master Parachutist Badge
Ranger tab
Military Free Fall Parachutist Badge
Joint Chiefs of Staff Identification Badge
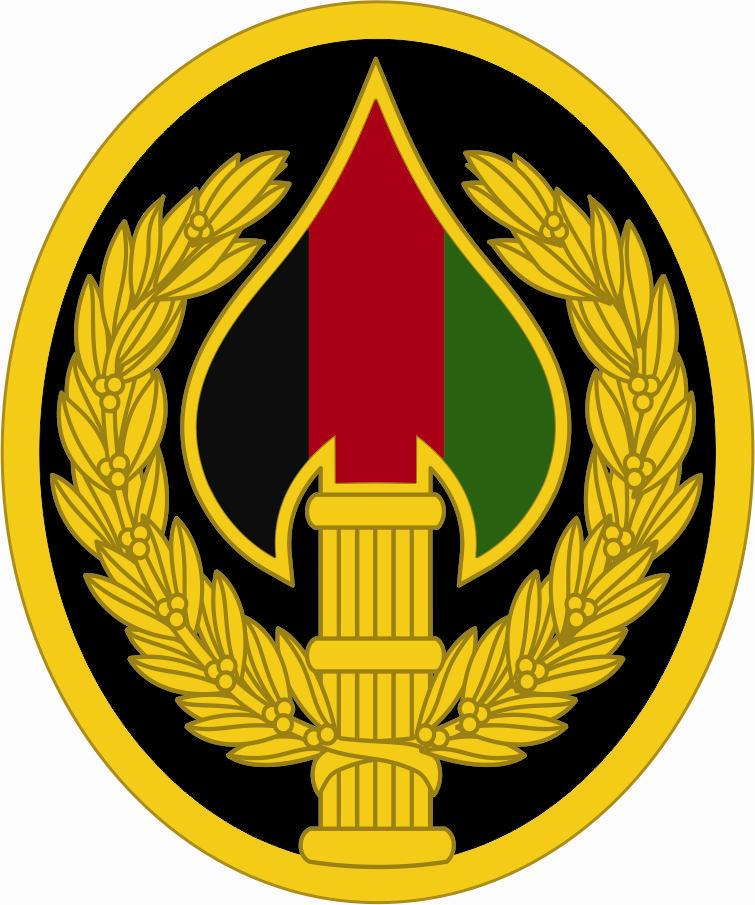
Special Operations Joint Task Force – Afghanistan Combat Service Identification Badge
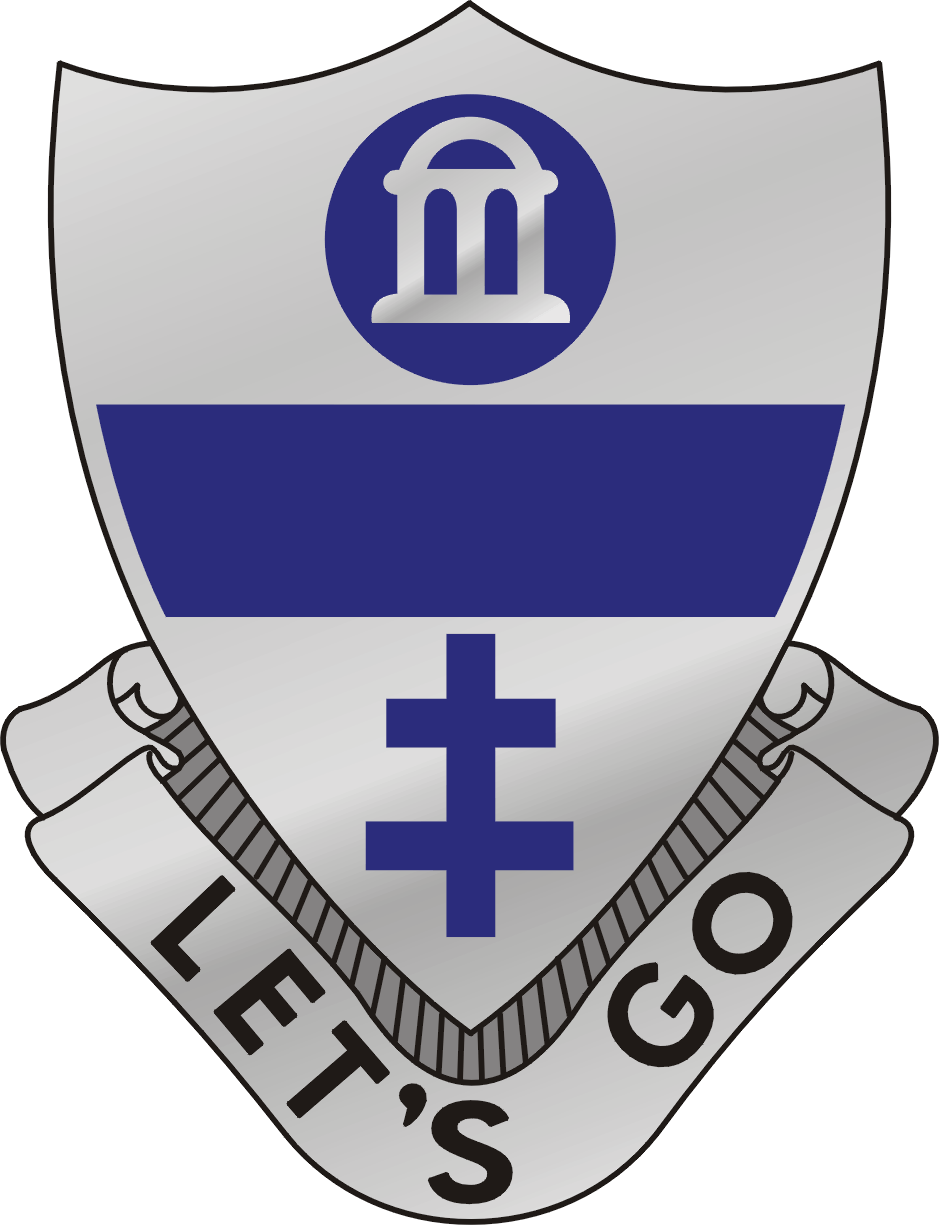
325th Infantry Regiment Distinctive Unit Insignia
16 Overseas Service Bars

Defense Distinguished Service Medal
Army Distinguished Service Medal
Defense Superior Service Medal with one bronze oak leaf cluster
Legion of Merit
Bronze Star
Purple Heart with oak leaf cluster
Defense Meritorious Service Medal with oak leaf cluster
Meritorious Service Medal
Joint Service Commendation Medal
Army Commendation Medal with oak leaf cluster
Joint Service Achievement Medal
Army Achievement Medal
Army Presidential Unit Citation
Valorous Unit Award
Army Superior Unit Award
National Defense Service Medal with one bronze service star
Armed Forces Expeditionary Medal
Afghanistan Campaign Medal (with campaign star)
Iraq Campaign Medal (with three campaign stars)
Global War on Terrorism Expeditionary Medal
Global War on Terrorism Service Medal
Korea Defense Service Medal
Army Service Ribbon
Army Overseas Service Ribbon with bronze award numeral 2
NATO Medal for service with ISAF

Military offices
Preceded by Raymond A. Thomas	Commander, Special Operations Joint Task Force-Afghanistan; 2013–2014	Succeeded by Edward M. Reeder Jr.
Preceded by H.R. McMaster	Commanding General, United States Army Maneuver Center of Excellence; 2014-2016	Succeeded by Eric J. Wesley
Preceded by Raymond A. Thomas	Commander, Joint Special Operations Command; 2016–2018	Succeeded by Scott A. Howell
Preceded by John W. Nicholson Jr.	Commander, NATO Resolute Support Mission; 2018–2021	Command disestablished
Preceded by John W. Nicholson Jr.	Commander, United States Forces Afghanistan; 2018–2021	Succeeded by Peter G. Vasely as Commander, U.S. Forces Afghanistan (Forward)
