= Anthony R. Hale =

American Army Lieutenant General

Lieutenant General Anthony R. Hale
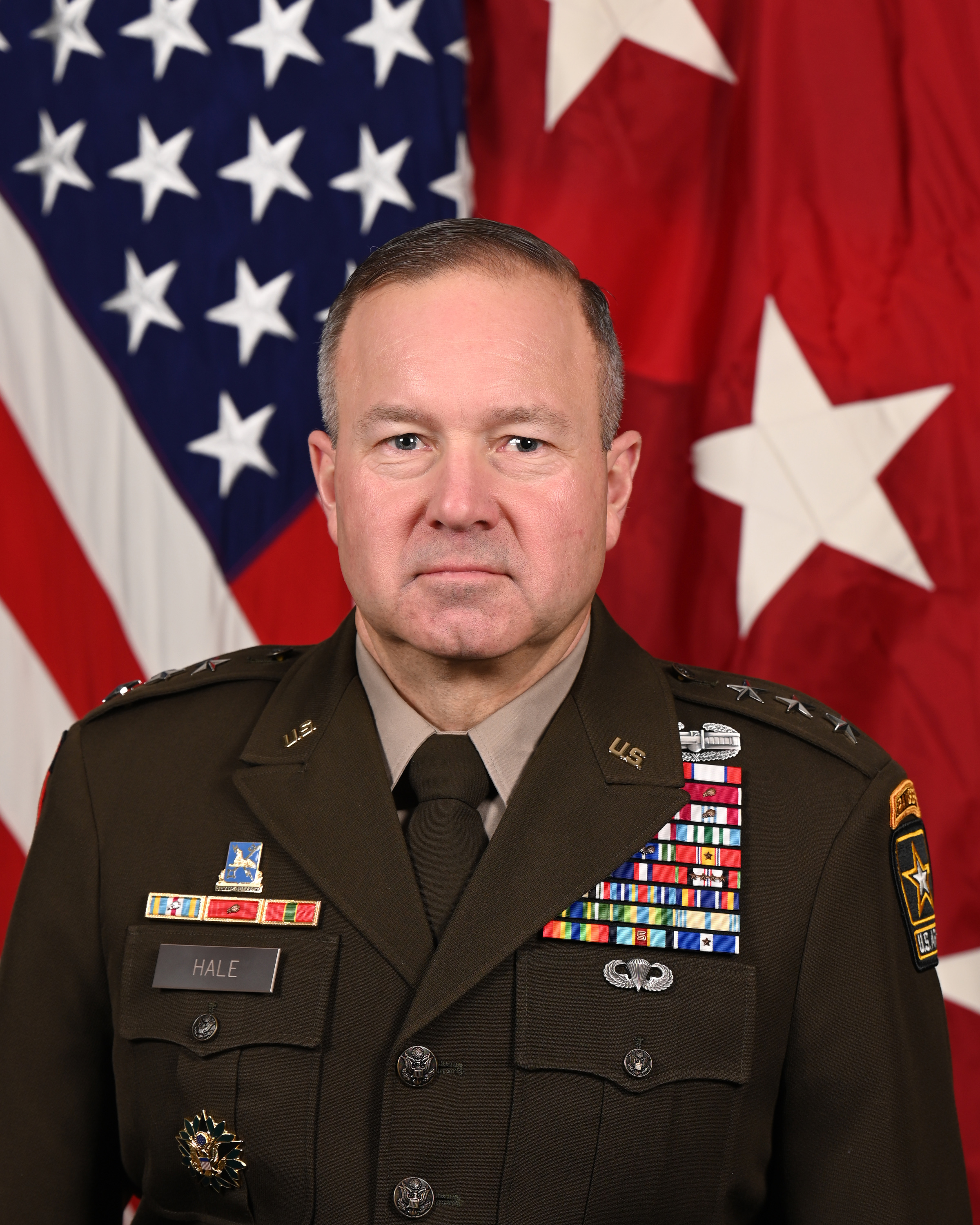
- Official portrait, 2024
- Military career
- Allegiance: United States
- Branch: United States Army
- Service years: 1990–2025
- Rank: Lieutenant General
- Nickname: Tony
- Commands: United States Army Intelligence Center; 704th Military Intelligence Brigade; 519th Military Intelligence Battalion
- Conflicts: War in Afghanistan; Iraq War
- Awards: Army Distinguished Service Medal; Defense Superior Service Medal (3); Legion of Merit (2); Bronze Star Medal (2)

Anthony Reynolds Hale is a retired Lieutenant General who previously served as the Deputy Chief of Staff for Intelligence (G-2) of the United States Army. Prior to that assignment, Hale previously served as the Commanding General of the United States Army Intelligence Center of Excellence and Fort Huachuca from 2020 to 2023. He was promoted to his current rank of lieutenant general on 3 January 2024. Prior to serving as the USAICoE & FH Commanding General, he was the United States Special Operations Command (SOCOM) J-2. He received his officer's commission in 1990 through the ROTC program at North Carolina State University.

== Educational Degrees ==
- Bachelor of Arts Degree in political science from North Carolina State University at Raleigh, NC
- Master of Arts Degree in National Security and Strategic Studies from the Naval War College at Newport, RI

== Military Schools Attended ==
- Military Intelligence Officer Basic & Advanced Courses at Fort Huachuca, AZ
- United States Naval Command & Staff College at Newport, RI
- Senior Service College Fellow at the University of North Carolina at Chapel Hill in Chapel Hill, NC

== Military career ==
=== Operational deployments ===
- Deputy Chief of Staff, Intelligence, Resolute Support Mission, North Atlantic Treaty Organization/Director, J-2, United States Forces-Afghanistan OPERATION FREEDOM'S SENTINEL & RESOLUTE SUPPORT
- Commander, 519th Military Intelligence Battalion (Airborne), OPERATION ENDURING FREEDOM, Afghanistan
- Aide-de-Camp to the Commander, United States Forces-Iraq, OPERATION IRAQI FREEDOM, Iraq
- Exercise and Training Officer, United States Army Office of Military Support, OPERATION ENDURING FREEDOM, Afghanistan
- Assistant Operations Officer, 501st Military Intelligence Battalion, 1st Brigade, 1st Armored Division, OPERATION JOINT ENDEAVOR, Bosnia-Herzegovina

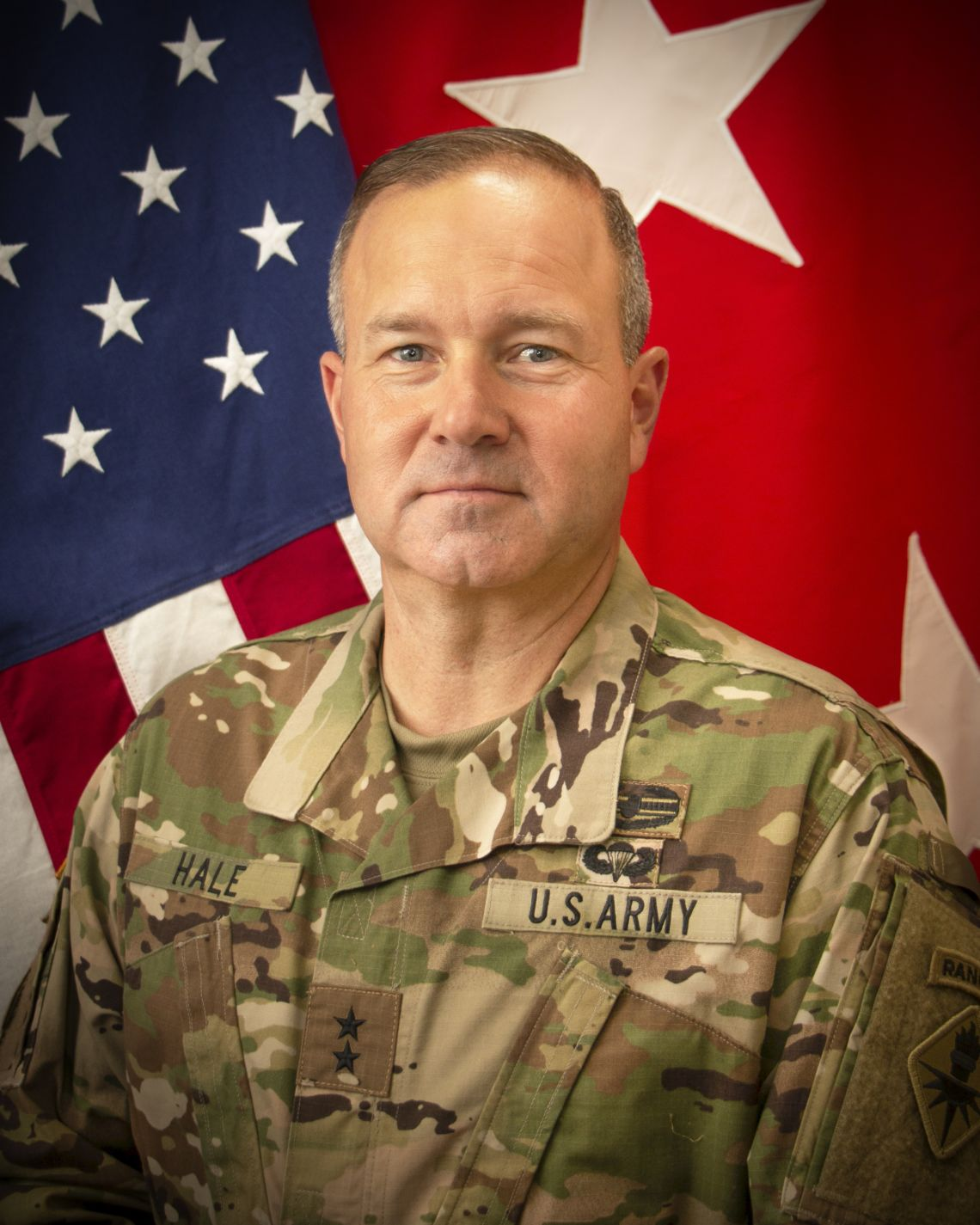
MG Hale OCP Command Photo

== Dates of rank ==
| Rank | Date |
|---|---|
| Second Lieutenant | 12 May 1990 |
| First Lieutenant | 7 March 1993 |
| Captain | 1 April 1995 |
| Major | 1 March 2002 |
| Lieutenant Colonel | 1 June 2007 |
| Colonel | 1 December 2011 |
| Brigadier General | 2 March 2018 |
| Major General | 25 February 2021 |
| Lieutenant General | 3 January 2024 |

== Recognitions and Honors ==
Hale's decorations and badges include the following:

U.S. Military Decorations
| Army Distinguished Service Medal |
| Defense Superior Service Medal with two oak leaf clusters |
| Legion of Merit with oak leaf cluster |
| Bronze Star Medal with one oak leaf cluster |
| Defense Meritorious Service Medal with oak leaf cluster |
| Meritorious Service Medal with two oak leaf clusters |
| Joint Service Commendation Medal |
| Army Commendation Medal with two oak leaf clusters |
| Army Achievement Medal with two oak leaf clusters |
| National Defense Service Medal with one bronze service star |
| Armed Forces Expeditionary Medal |
| Afghanistan Campaign Medal with four campaign stars |
| Iraq Campaign Medal with three campaign stars |
| Global War on Terrorism Expeditionary Medal |
| Global War on Terrorism Service Medal |
| Korea Defense Service Medal |
| Armed Forces Service Medal |
| Armed Forces Reserve Medal |
| Army Service Ribbon |
| Army Overseas Service Ribbon with bronze award numeral 5 |
| NATO Medal for Kosovo |

U.S. Badges, Patches and Tabs
| Combat Action Badge |
| Basic Parachutist Badge |
| Army Staff Identification Badge |
| Ranger tab |
| USASOC Combat Service Identification Badge |
| Army Military Intelligence Corps Distinctive Unit Insignia |

U.S. unit awards
| Joint Meritorious Unit Award (With One Silver Oak Leaf Cluster, indicating a fifth award) |
| Army Meritorious Unit Commendation |
| Army Superior Unit Award |

Military offices
| Preceded by Gary W. Johnston | Deputy Chief of Staff for Intelligence of Resolute Support Mission and Director of Intelligence of United States Forces-Afghanistan; 2019 | Succeeded by Michelle A. Schmidt |
| Preceded by Michelle A. Schmidt | Director of Intelligence of the United States Special Operations Command; 2019–2020 | Succeeded by Nicholas M. Homan |
| Preceded by Laura A. Potter | Commanding General and Commandant of the United States Army Intelligence Center; 2020–2023 | Succeeded by Richard T. Appelhans |
| Preceded by Laura A. Potter | Deputy Chief of Staff for Intelligence of the United States Army; 2024–2025 | Succeeded by Michelle A. Schmidt |
