= Laura Potter =

U.S. Army general

Laura A. Potter
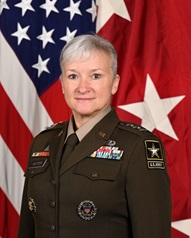
- Military career
- Allegiance: United States
- Branch: United States Army
- Service years: 1989–2025
- Rank: Lieutenant General
- Commands: United States Army Intelligence Center of Excellence; 650th Military Intelligence Group; 743rd Military Intelligence Battalion
- Conflicts: Iraq War; War in Afghanistan
- Awards: Defense Superior Service Medal; Legion of Merit (2); Bronze Star Medal (2)

Laura A. Potter is a retired United States Army lieutenant general who has served as the 58th director of the Army Staff from 5 January 2024 to 28 August 2025. She most recently served as the deputy chief of staff for intelligence (G-2) of the United States Army from 2020 to 2024. Previously, she was the commanding general of the United States Army Intelligence Center of Excellence.

In May 2023, Potter was nominated for reappointment as a lieutenant general with assignment as director of the Army Staff.

Military offices
Preceded by Paul D. Nelson	Director of Intelligence of the United States European Command; 2016–2019	Succeeded by Thomas Hensley
Preceded by Robert P. Walters Jr.	Commanding General and Commandant of the United States Army Intelligence Center and Fort Huachuca; 2019–2020	Succeeded by Anthony R. Hale
Preceded by Scott D. Berrier	Deputy Chief of Staff for Intelligence of the United States Army; 2020–2024	Succeeded by Anthony R. Hale
Preceded by Walter E. Piatt	Director of the Army Staff; 2024–2025	Succeeded by Marcus S. Evans
