= Michelle A. Schmidt =

U.S. Army general

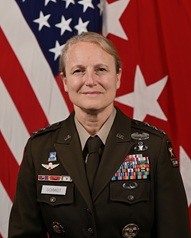
- Official portrait, 2026
- Military career
- Allegiance: United States
- Branch: United States Army
- Service years: 1992-
- Rank: Lieutenant General
- Commands: 7th Infantry Division; Intelligence Brigade, JSOC
- Conflicts: War in Afghanistan; Iraq War; Operation Inherent Resolve; Operation Uphold Democracy
- Awards: Distinguished Service Medal; Defense Superior Service Medal (2); Legion of Merit; Bronze Star Medal (9)

Michelle A. Schmidt is a United States Army lieutenant general who is serving as Deputy Chief of Staff for Intelligence (G-2) at the United States Army Staff. She most recently has served as commanding general of the 7th Infantry Division from September 15, 2023, to October 2025, and as the deputy commanding general of the I Corps from August to September 2023.

== Military career ==
Schmidt attended the United States Military Academy, graduating as a member of the class of 1992. She was commissioned as a military intelligence officer and began her career as a platoon leader in the 2nd Infantry Division in South Korea. She later served as company commander in the 82nd Airborne Division before serving as the intelligence officer for the 504th Parachute Infantry Regiment and later for the entire division.

During the September 11 attacks, Schmidt served as military intern in the office of Deputy Secretary of Defense Paul Wolfowitz. She left the Pentagon for her morning run around 8:00 AM and was on her way back when Flight 77 hit the building. She recounts not seeing the plane hit the building, but seeing the explosion which she initially believed to be a bomb.

She later described the attacks as vital to her decision of staying in the military instead of choosing a different career path, something she had been considering up to that point.

She also served as senior intelligence officer and squadron commander for the 1st Special Operations Detachment-Delta.

Schmidt later became the intelligence brigade commander for Joint Special Operations Command, chief of staff for the 82nd Airborne Division and eventually served as chief of the initiatives group for the Vice Chief of Staff of the Army.

She was promoted to brigadier general on June 2, 2018. Her initial general officer assignment was as Director of Intelligence (J-2) of US Special Operations Command until June 2019.

In June 2019, she assumed the role of deputy commanding general, 10th Mountain Division (Light). She was then assigned as Deputy Chief of Staff for Intelligence of the Resolute Support Mission and Director of Intelligence for United States Forces-Afghanistan from July 2020 to the end of the U.S. involvement in July 2021.

Schmidt was promoted to major general on July 29, 2021, and assigned as Director of Operations for the Defense Intelligence agency until 2022.

She then worked as the director of force development of the United States Army until August 2023. From August to September 2023, she served as deputy commanding general of the I Corps. In September 2023, she assumed command of the 7th Infantry Division, a position she held until October 2025.

Schmidt was promoted to lieutenant general on December 5, 2025, in her current role as Deputy Chief of Staff for Intelligence (G-2) of the United States Army.

She has completed 15 deployments to Iraq and three to Afghanistan, earning her twelve Overseas Service Bars.

== Awards and decorations ==

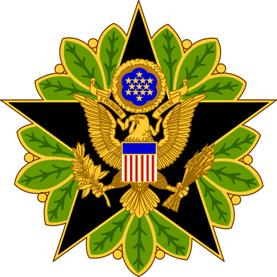
Foreign awards

Unit awards

Combat Service Identification Badge

Badges and insignia
Combat Action Badge
Master Parachutist Badge
Personal decorations
Army Distinguished Service Medal		Defense Superior Service Medal with one bronze oak leaf cluster
Legion of Merit	Bronze Star Medal with one silver and three bronze oak leaf clusters	Defense Meritorious Service Medal
Meritorious Service Medal with four oak leaf clusters	Joint Service Commendation Medal with two oak leaf clusters	Army Commendation Medal with two oak leaf clusters
Joint Service Achievement Medal	Army Achievement Medal with two oak leaf clusters	National Defense Service Medal with one service star
Service and campaign medals
Armed Forces Expeditionary Medal	Afghanistan Campaign Medal with one service star	Iraq Campaign Medal with four service stars
Global War on Terrorism Expeditionary Medal	Global War on Terrorism Service Medal	Korea Defense Service Medal
Humanitarian Service Medal	Army Service Ribbon	Army Overseas Service Ribbon
Identification badges
Army Staff Identification Badge
Office of the Secretary of Defense Identification Badge		
Foreign awards
Canadian Parachutist Badge
Unit awards
Valorous Unit Award with one bronze oak leaf cluster	Meritorious Unit Commendation with two bronze oak leaf clusters	Republic of Korea Presidential Unit Citation
Combat Service Identification Badge
United States Army Special Operations Command

Military offices
Preceded by Gary W. Johnston	Director of Intelligence of the United States Special Operations Command; 201?–2019	Succeeded by Anthony R. Hale
Preceded by Gregory K. Anderson	Deputy Commanding General (Support) of the 10th Mountain Division; 2019–2020	Succeeded by Michael R. Eastman
Preceded by Daniel L. Simpson	Deputy Chief of Staff for Intelligence of Resolute Support Mission and Director of Intelligence of United States Forces-Afghanistan; 2020–2021	Succeeded by ???
Preceded by Peter Vasely	Director for Operations of the Defense Intelligence Agency; 2021–2022	Succeeded by Keith C. Phillips
Preceded by Michael C. McCurry II	Director of Force Development of the United States Army; 2022–2023	Succeeded by Joseph E. Hilbert
Preceded by William A. Ryan III	Deputy Commanding General of I Corps; 2023	Succeeded by Matthew W. McFarlane
Preceded by Stephen G. Smith	Commanding General of the 7th Infantry Division; 2023–2025	Succeeded by Bernard J. Harrington
Preceded by Anthony R. Hale	Deputy Chief of Staff for Intelligence of the United States Army; 2025–present	Incumbent
