= Gary W. Johnston =

US Army general (1964–2022)

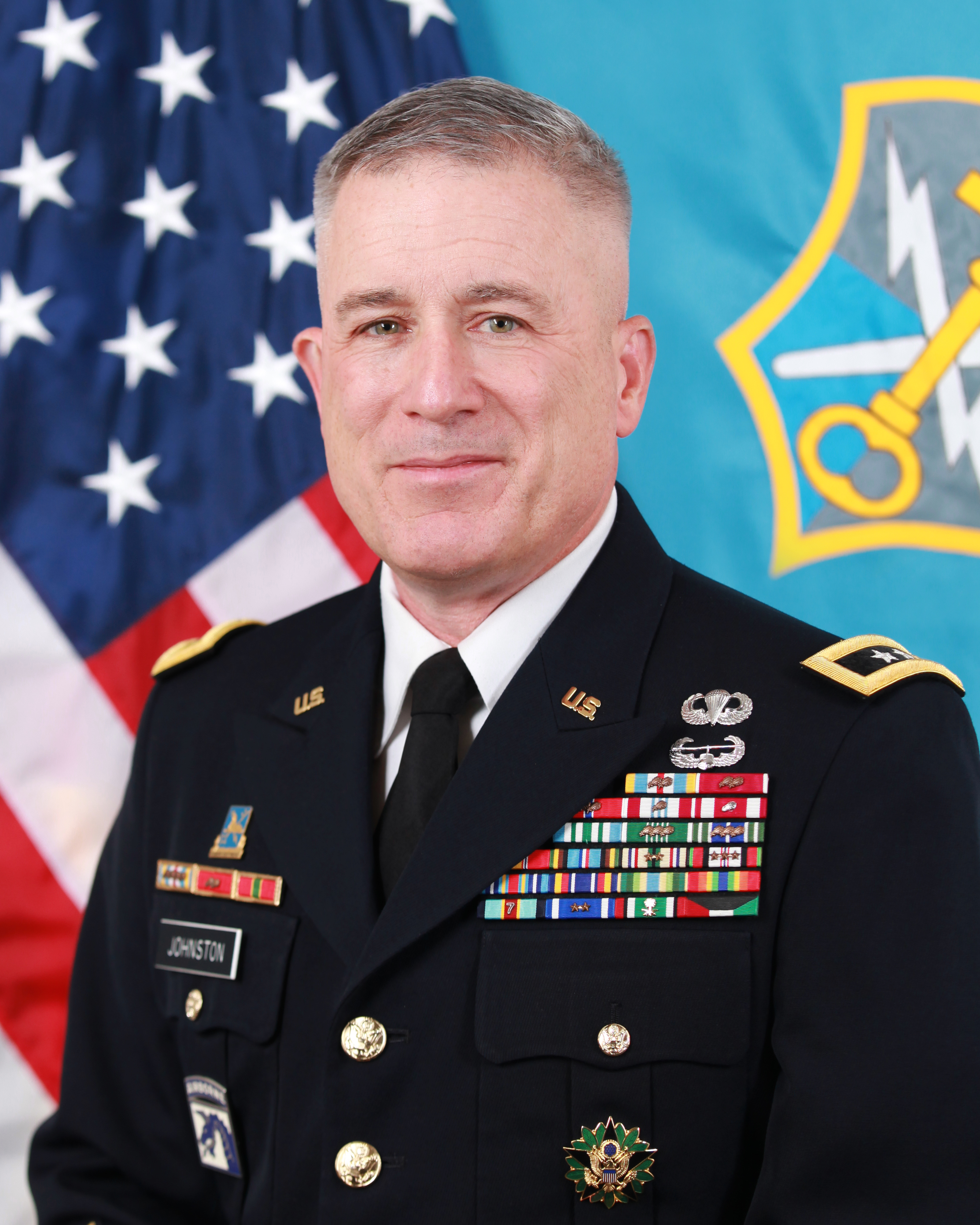
- Johnston in uniform, 2019
- Born: October 21, 1964; Russellville, Arkansas, U.S.
- Died: January 20, 2022 (aged 57); Alexandria, Virginia, U.S.
- Burial place: Arlington National Cemetery
- Education: Arkansas Tech University (BS); Joint Military Intelligence College (MS); United States Army War College; United States Army Command and General Staff College; Joint Forces Staff College
- Spouse: BG Amy E. Hannah
- Children: 3
- Military career
- Allegiance: United States of America
- Branch: United States Army
- Rank: Major General
- Commands: United States Army Intelligence and Security Command; Combined Task Force Viper; Task Force 165
- Awards: Defense Superior Service Medal (3); Legion of Merit (3); Bronze Star Medal (3)

Gary Wayne Johnston (October 21, 1964 – January 20, 2022) was a United States Army major general who last served as the commanding general of the United States Army Intelligence and Security Command (INSCOM) from June 2018 to July 2021. As commander of the direct reporting unit, he served as the overall mission commander for the Army's 17,500 operational intelligence forces and a key source of logistics and support to the United States Intelligence Community. Prior to leading INSCOM, he held various roles in Army intelligence supporting U.S. operations in primarily Southwest Asia.

== Military career ==
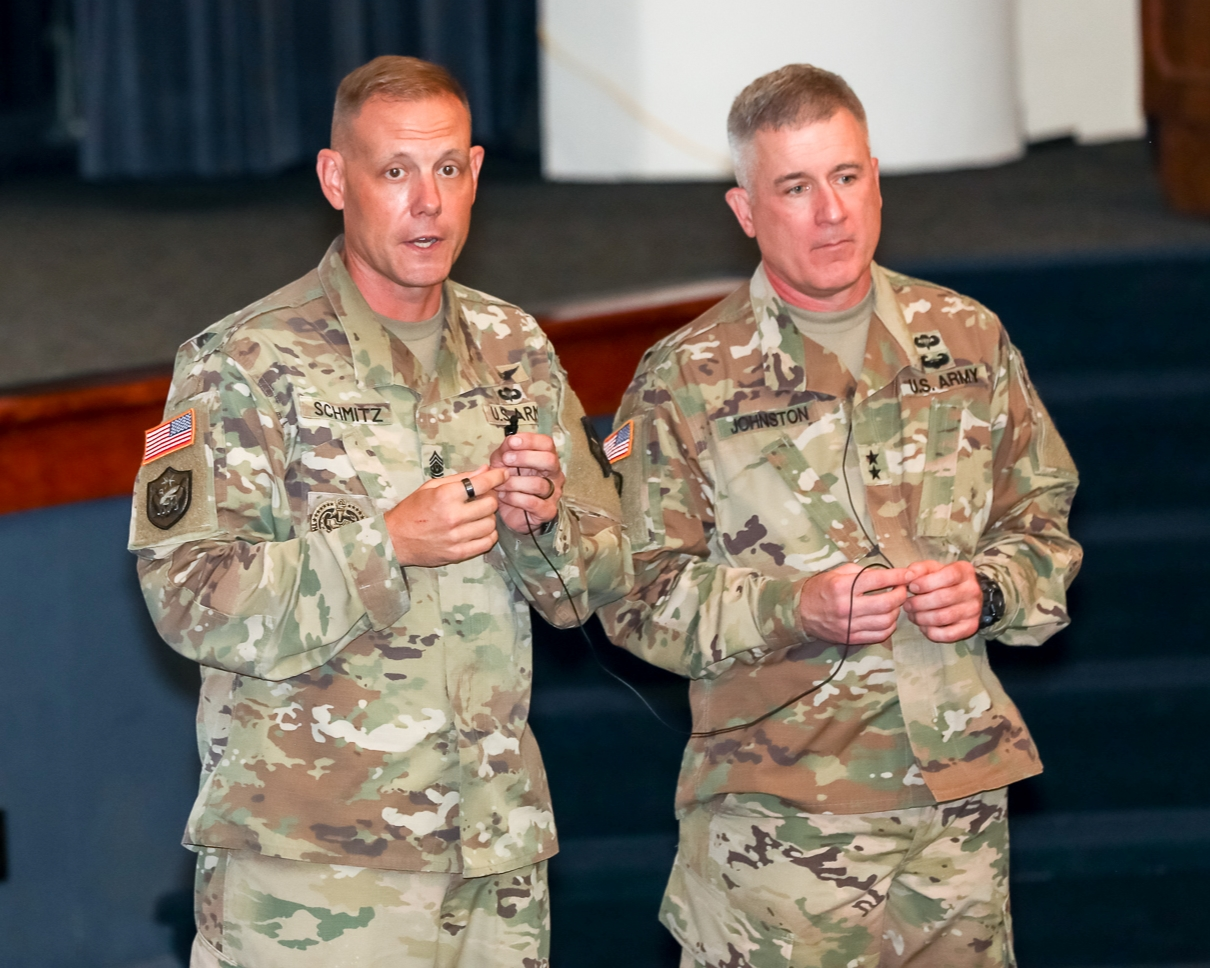
Johnston with CSM Schmitz in 2019.

In his 34-year career in the United States Army, Johnston held command at every level from company to two-star general. He served in outside the contiguous United States in Germany, Hawaii, and Afghanistan.

Johnston's career skewed toward US operations in Southwest Asia. Early in his career, he served in Operation Desert Storm as a squadron intelligence officer in the 3rd Armored Cavalry (1990–1991). From 2005 to 2018, he served four tours in Afghanistan, commanding the 165th MI Battalion as part of Combined Joint Task Force (CJTF) 76, then the 504th Battlefield Surveillance Brigade as part of CJTF 82. He returned to Afghanistan eighteen months later, serving as the deputy J-2 for the International Security Assistance Force (ISAF) Joint Command in Afghanistan (2014).

Returning to the US, Johnston was assigned as G-2 of the XVIII Airborne Corps (2012–2015), before becoming J-2 at U.S. Special Operations Command (USSOCOM) from 2016 to 2017. In late 2017 Johnston deployed to Afghanistan for the last time, dual-hatted as J-2 for U.S. Forces in Afghanistan and the Deputy Chief of Staff, Intelligence for the NATO Resolute Support Mission.

=== Command of INSCOM ===
From June 2018 to July 2021, Johnston moved to Fort Belvoir, Virginia, to lead U.S. Army Intelligence and Security Command (INSCOM), the Army component of the U.S. Intelligence Community and the Central Security Service. Despite the limitations imposed by the COVID-19 pandemic, during his tenure Johnston spearheaded the development of Army Counterintelligence Command and activation of a dedicated military intelligence group for Army Cyber Command. As commander of INSCOM, Johnston also led investigations into the death of his senior enlisted advisor, Command Sergeant Major Eric M. Schmitz, and suicide of clandestine intelligence operative sergeant first class Michael Froede.

Johnston relinquished command in July 2021 and after terminal leave, retired in October 2021.

== Retirement ==
Following his retirement in October 2021, Johnston joined the board of North Carolina–based defense contractor Leyden Solutions.

== Personal life ==
Johnston was born in Russellville, Arkansas, in 1964. He attended Arkansas Tech University, graduating in 1987 and earning a commission into the Army through ROTC.

== Death ==
On January 20, 2022, Johnston killed himself; an Army investigation is underway. He is buried in section 81 of Arlington National Cemetery.

Military offices
Preceded by Robert P. Walters Jr.	Director of Intelligence of the United States Special Operations Command; 2016–2017	Succeeded by Michelle A. Schmidt
Preceded by Robert P. Walters Jr.	Deputy Chief of Staff for Intelligence of the Resolute Support Mission and Director of Intelligence of United States Forces Afghanistan; 2017–2018	Succeeded by Anthony R. Hale
Preceded by Christopher S. Ballard	Commanding General of the United States Army Intelligence and Security Command; 2018–2021	Succeeded by Michele H. Bredenkamp
