= United States Army Intelligence Center =

U.S. Army's school for professional training in military intelligence

Coordinates: 31.5553°N 110.3497°W

United States Army Intelligence Center of Excellence
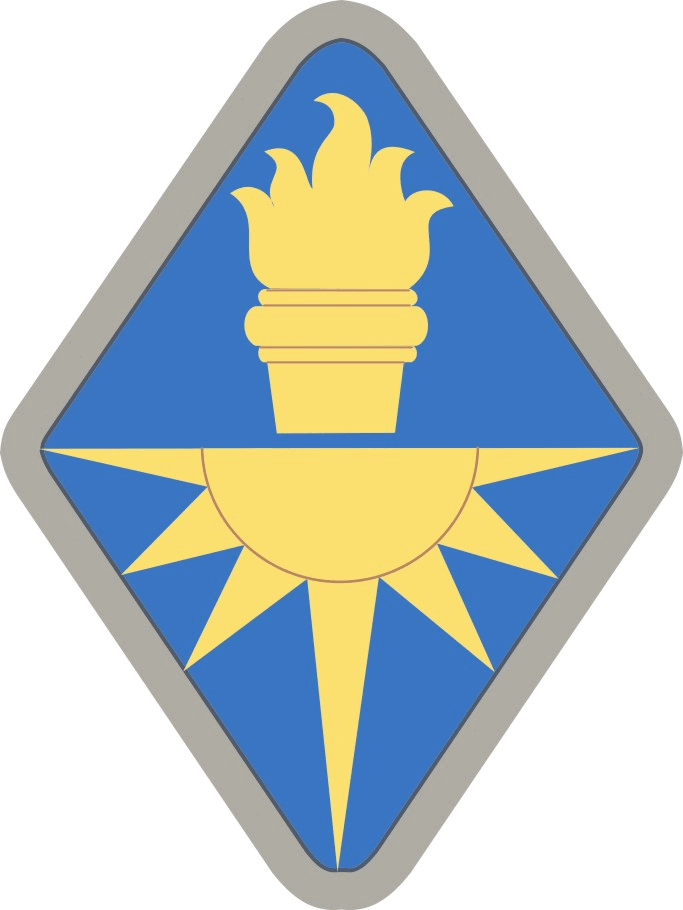
- USAICoE Shoulder sleeve insignia
- Active: 1971–present
- Country: United States
- Branch: United States Army
- Type: Training
- Role: Intelligence training
- Part of: United States Army Combined Arms Command
- Garrison/HQ: Fort Huachuca
- Mottos: "Truth, Vigilance, Victory"; "Always Out Front"
- Colors: Blue and Gold
- March: US Army Military Intelligence Song
- Mascot: Sphinx

Commanders
- Commander: MG Richard T. Appelhans
- Command Sergeant Major: CSM Jesse Townsend

Insignia
- Distinctive unit insignia

The United States Army Intelligence Center of Excellence (USAICoE) is the United States Army's school for professional training of military intelligence personnel. It is a component of United States Army Transformation and Training Command (T2COM).

== History ==
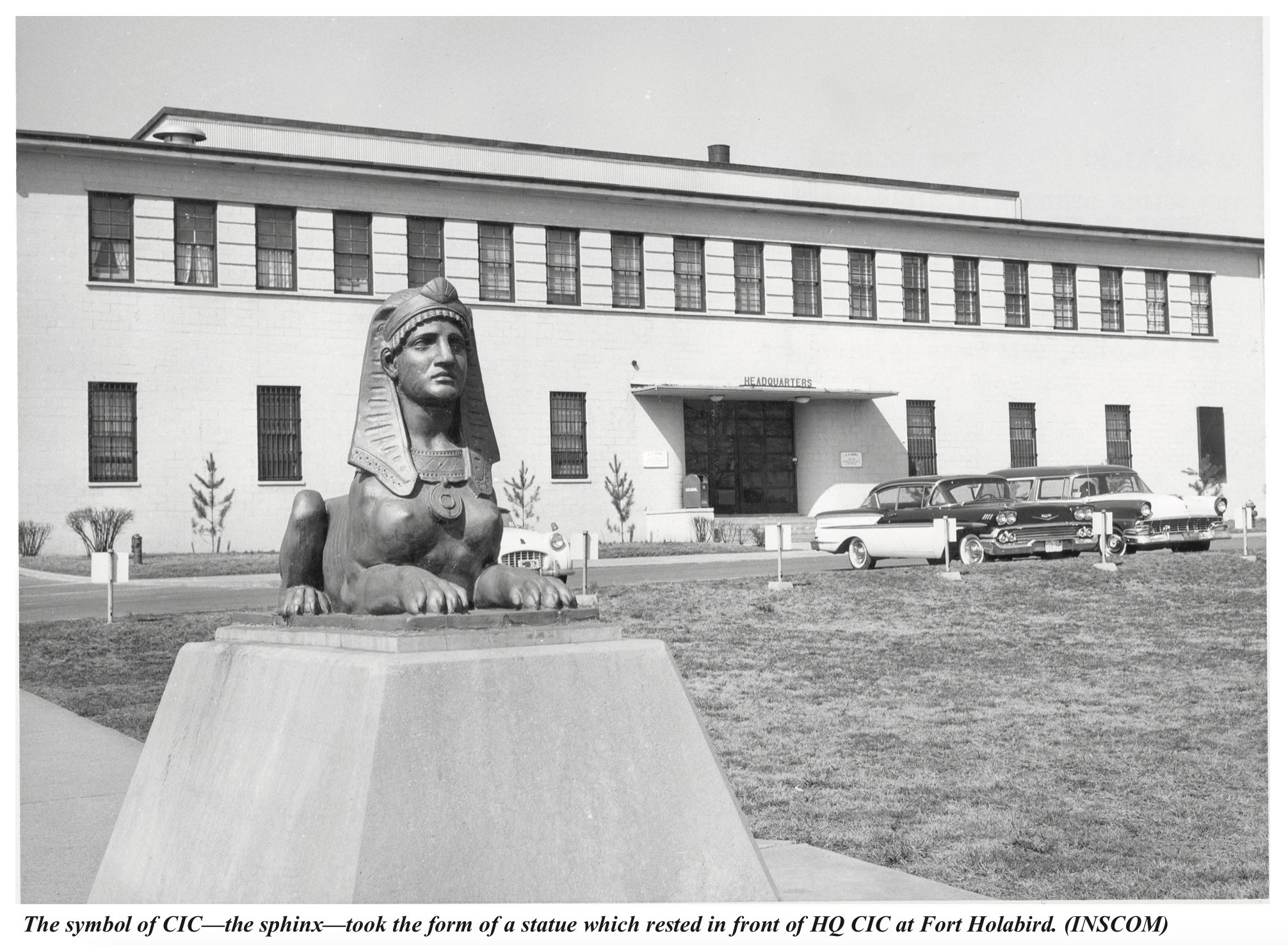

The center was relocated from Ft. Holabird, Maryland to Fort Huachuca, Arizona in 1971. The move involved more than 120 moving vans, a unit train and several aircraft. The initial intelligence training facilities were a World War II hospital complex that had not been occupied in several years.

== Training ==
The school conducts resident courses for enlisted, warrant officer, and commissioned officer personnel, as well as for international military students in military exchange programs. United States Army personnel who train at the school become members of the Military Intelligence Corps. AIT students training to become Systems Maintainers (42 weeks), Intelligence Analysts (16 weeks), Human Intelligence Collectors (19 weeks), Geospatial Intelligence Imagery Analyst (22 weeks), UAS Operators (23 weeks), and Special Agents with United States Army Counterintelligence, all receive training here.

== Military Intelligence Hall of Fame ==
The school also administers the Military Intelligence Hall of Fame.

== List of commanders ==
- MG John M. Custer III, 29 June 2007
- MG Gregg C. Potter, 8 December 2010
- MG Robert P. Ashley, 19 April 2013
- MG Scott D. Berrier, 31 July 2015
- MG Robert P. Walters Jr., 14 July 2017
- MG Laura A. Potter, 19 July 2019
- MG Anthony R. Hale, 12 August 2020
- CSM Chris A. Sampson, 2023

== See also ==
- National Intelligence University
- Mercyhurst University Institute for Intelligence Studies
- Camp Peary
- United States Army Military Intelligence

=== In other countries ===
- Canadian Forces School of Military Intelligence
- Defence College of Intelligence
