= 704th Military Intelligence Brigade =

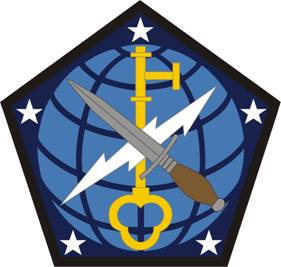
- 704th Military Intelligence Brigade shoulder sleeve insignia
- Active: 1 January 1988–present
- Country: United States
- Allegiance: United States Army Intelligence and Security Command
- Branch: United States Army
- Part of: National Security Agency
- Mottos: Here and Everywhere (official)

Commanders
- Current commander: COL Tissa L. Strouse
- Command Sergeant Major: CSM Lourdes Barragan

Insignia
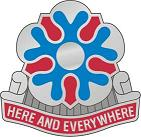
- 704th Military Intelligence Brigade distinctive unit insignia

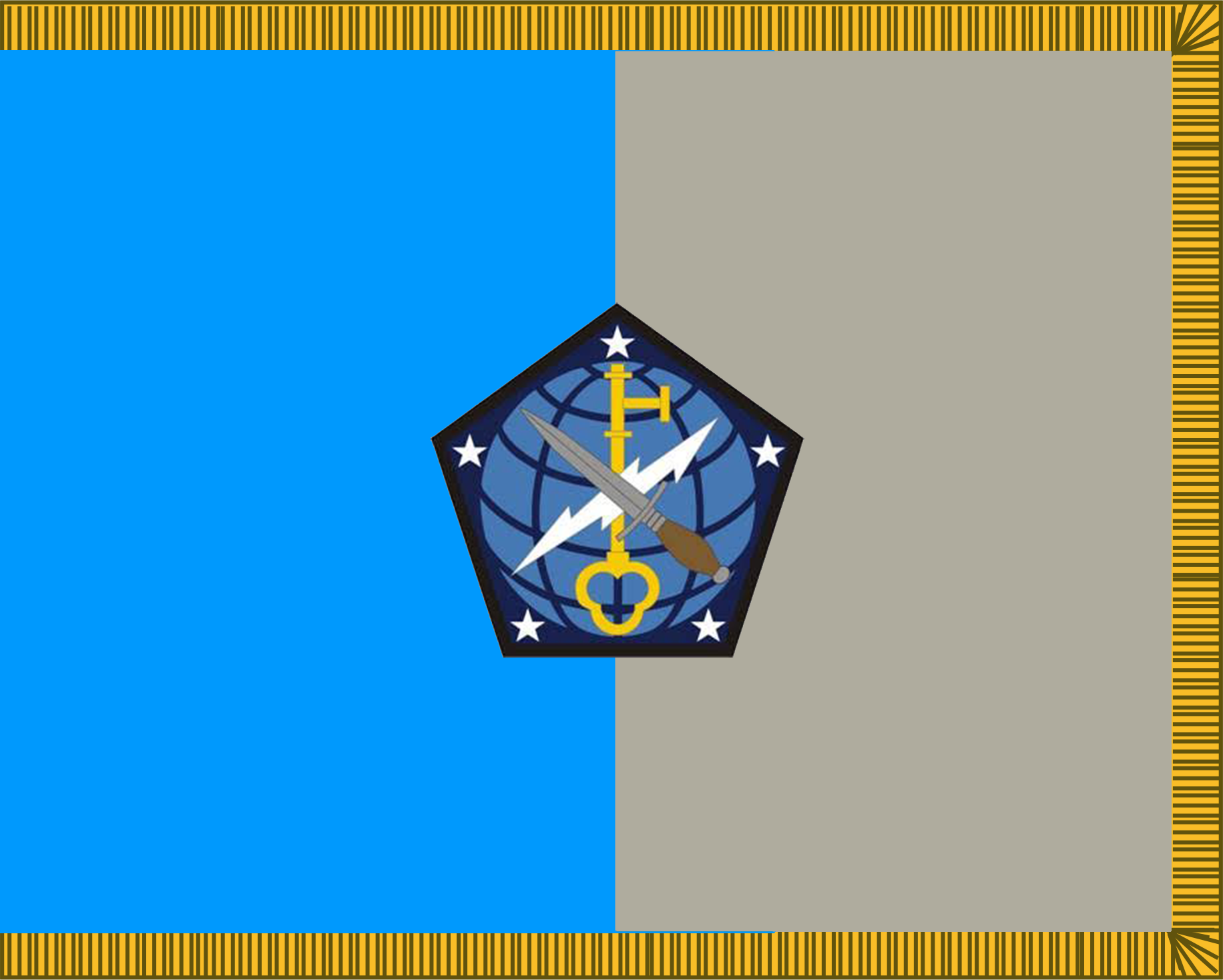
- 704th Military Intelligence Brigade Flag

The 704th Military Intelligence Brigade, a subordinate unit of the U.S. Army Intelligence and Security Command, conducts synchronized full-spectrum signals intelligence, computer network, and information assurance operations directly and through the National Security Agency to satisfy national, joint, combined and Army information requirements.

== Subordinate units ==
- Headquarters and Headquarters Company
- 741st Military Intelligence Battalion
- 742nd Military Intelligence Battalion
- 743rd Military Intelligence Battalion
- United States Army Technical Support Squadron (USATSS)

=== 741st MI Battalion ===
This Battalion is stationed at Fort George G. Meade, Maryland.

The 741st MI Battalion provides soldiers to conduct information superiority operations within the National Security Agency and Central Security Service; linguist support to the National Security Agency, the intelligence community and other U.S. government agencies; and operates the Joint Training Center on behalf of the INSCOM, Air Intelligence Agency and Naval Network Warfare Command.

=== 742nd MI Battalion ===
Also at Fort George G. Meade, the 742nd conducts contributory analysis and reporting through the Army Technical Control and Analysis Element, carries out information operations and supports satellite communications systems.

=== 743rd MI Battalion ===
Located at Buckley Space Force Base, Colorado, the 743rd provides technically qualified “space smart” soldiers for exercises and in support of tactical commanders.

== External links and Sources ==
- Brigade Website
- Brigade Lineage
- US Army Intelligence and Security Command
