= Operation Freedom's Sentinel =

2015–2021 US military operation during the War in Afghanistan

- Part of the war on terror, War in Afghanistan, Resolute Support Mission
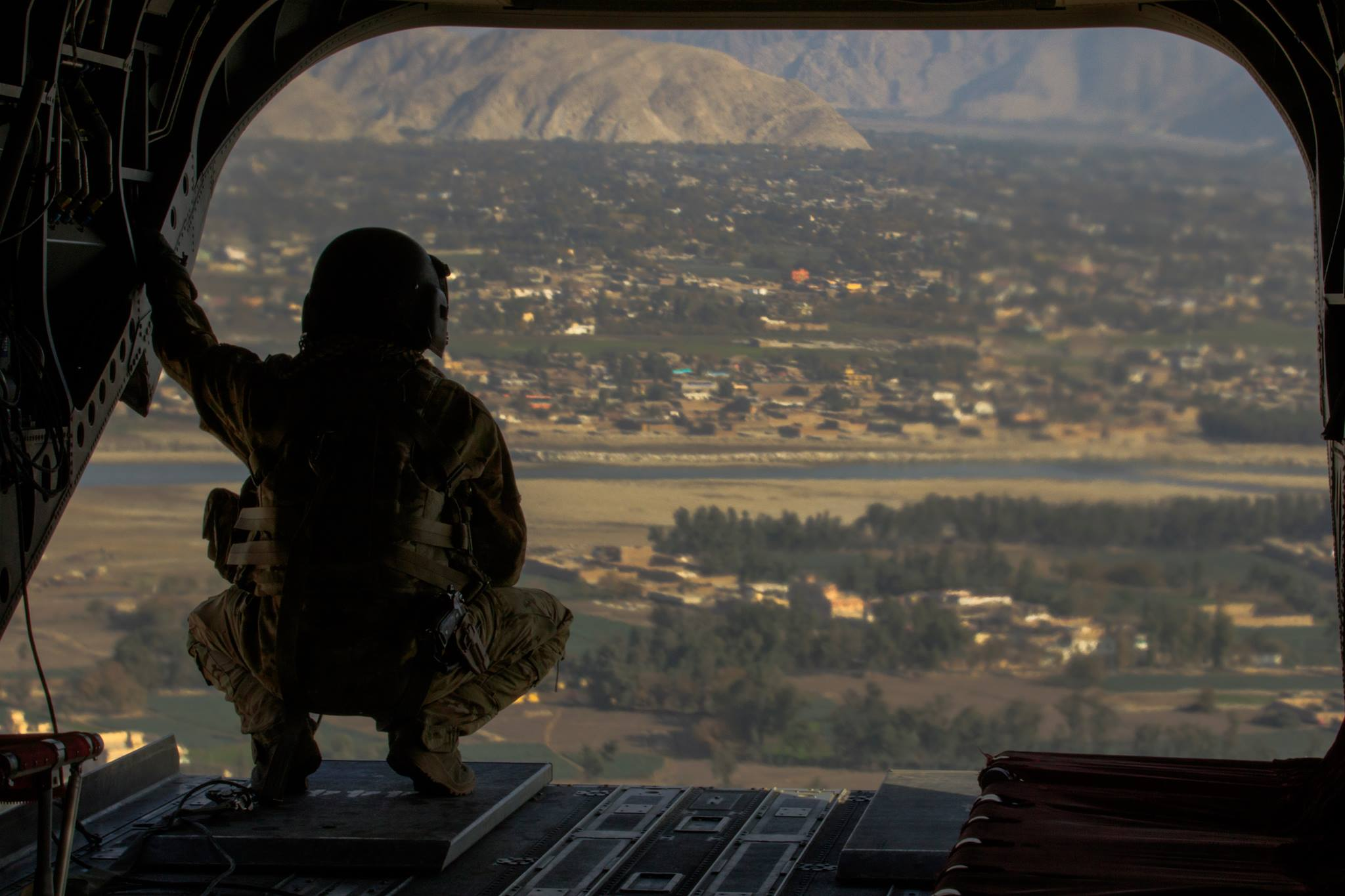
- A U.S. Army crew chief with 17th Cavalry Regiment surveys the area over Jalalabad, Afghanistan.
Date	1 January 2015 – 30 August 2021 (6 years, 7 months and 2 weeks)
Location	Afghanistan
Result	Fall of the Islamic Republic of Afghanistan to the Taliban; Evacuation of US citizens and at-risk Afghans from Kabul

Belligerents
NATO: Resolute Support Mission; Islamic Republic of Afghanistan; United States (Part of Resolute Support Mission); DoD Contractor Personnel	(Afghanistan) Taliban; al-Qaeda; Islamic State: ISIS–K

Commanders and leaders
CIC Joe R. Biden (2021); CIC Donald Trump (2017–2021); CIC Barack H. Obama (2014–2017): United States Central Command: Gen. Kenneth F. McKenzie Jr., USMC (2019–2021); GEN Joseph Votel, USA (2016–19); GEN Lloyd Austin, USA (2015–16); (NATO) Resolute Support Mission: GEN Austin S. Miller, USA (2018–2021); GEN John W. Nicholson Jr., USA (2016-18); GEN John F. Campbell, USA (2015–16); Coalition: RS (2015–2021): (Luxembourg) Henri; (Luxembourg) Xavier Bettel; (Slovenia) Borut Pahor; (Slovenia) Janez Janša; (Slovenia) Marjan Šarec; (Slovenia) Miro Cerar; (New Zealand) Jacinda Ardern; (New Zealand) Bill English; (New Zealand) John Key; (Greece) Katerina Sakellaropoulou; (Greece) Prokopis Pavlopoulos; (Greece) Karolos Papoulias; (Greece) Kyriakos Mitsotakis; (Greece) Alexis Tsipras; (Greece) Antonis Samaras; (Austria) Alexander Van der Bellen; (Austria) Heinz Fischer; (Austria) Sebastian Kurz; (Austria) Brigitte Bierlein; (Austria) Christian Kern; (Austria) Werner Faymann; (Ukraine) Volodymyr Zelenskyy; (Ukraine) Petro Poroshenko; (Ukraine) Denys Shmyhal; (Ukraine) Oleksiy Honcharuk; (Ukraine) Volodymyr Groysman; (Ukraine) Arseniy Yatsenyuk; (Montenegro) Milo Đukanović; (Montenegro) Filip Vujanović; (Montenegro) Zdravko Krivokapić; (Montenegro) Duško Marković; (Latvia) Egils Levits; (Latvia) Raimonds Vējonis; (Latvia) Krišjānis Kariņš; (Latvia) Māris Kučinskis; (Latvia) Laimdota Straujuma; (Estonia) Kersti Kaljulaid; (Estonia) Toomas Hendrik Ilves; (Estonia) Kaja Kallas; (Estonia) Jüri Ratas; (Estonia) Taavi Rõivas; (North Macedonia) Stevo Pendarovski; (North Macedonia) Gjorge Ivanov; (North Macedonia) Zoran Zaev; (North Macedonia) Oliver Spasovski; (North Macedonia) Emil Dimitriev; (North Macedonia) Nikola Gruevski; (Lithuania) Gitanas Nausėda; (Lithuania) Dalia Grybauskaitė; (Lithuania) Ingrida Šimonytė; (Lithuania) Saulius Skvernelis; (Lithuania) Algirdas Butkevičius; (Slovakia) Zuzana Čaputová; (Slovakia) Andrej Kiska; (Slovakia) Eduard Heger; (Slovakia) Igor Matovič; (Slovakia) Peter Pellegrini; (Slovakia) Robert Fico; (Norway) Harald V; (Norway) Erna Solberg; (Finland) Sauli Niinistö; (Spain) Pedro Sánchez; (Spain) Mariano Rajoy; (Bosnia and Herzegovina) Sifet Podžić; (Bosnia and Herzegovina) Marina Pendeš; (Belgium) Sophie Wilmès; (Belgium) Charles Michel; (Hungary) János Áder; (Hungary) Viktor Orbán; (Albania) Ilir Meta; (Albania) Bujar Nishani; (Croatia) Zoran Milanović; (Croatia) Kolinda Grabar-Kitarović; (Azerbaijan) Ilham Aliyev; (Armenia) Nikol Pashinyan; (Armenia) Karen Karapetyan; (Armenia) Hovik Abrahamyan; (Denmark) Mette Frederiksen; (Denmark) Lars Løkke Rasmussen; (Bulgaria) Rumen Radev; (Bulgaria) Rosen Plevneliev; (Netherlands) Mark Rutte; (Portugal) Marcelo Rebelo de Sousa; (Portugal) Aníbal Cavaco Silva; (Australia) Scott Morrison; (Australia) Malcolm Turnbull; (Mongolia) Khaltmaagiin Battulga; (Mongolia) Tsakhiagiin Elbegdorj; (Czech Republic) Miloš Zeman; (Poland) Andrzej Duda; (Turkey) Recep Tayyip Erdoğan; (Romania) Klaus Iohannis; (Romania) Victor Ponta; (Romania) Gabriel Oprea; (Romania) Sorin Cîmpeanu; (Romania) Dacian Cioloș; (Romania) Sorin Grindeanu; (Romania) Mihai Tudose; (Romania) Mihai Fifor; (Romania) Viorica Dăncilă; (Romania) Ludovic Orban; (Romania) Nicolae Ciucă; (Romania) Florin Cîțu; (Georgia (country)) Salome Zourabichvili; (Georgia (country)) Giorgi Margvelashvili; (Georgia (country)) Irakli Garibashvili; (Georgia (country)) Giorgi Kvirikashvili; (Georgia (country)) Mamuka Bakhtadze; (Georgia (country)) Giorgi Gakharia; (Georgia (country)) Maya Tskitishvili; (Italy) Giuseppe Conte; (Italy) Paolo Gentiloni; (Italy) Matteo Renzi; (Germany) Angela Merkel; (United Kingdom) Boris Johnson; (United Kingdom) Theresa May; (United Kingdom) David Cameron; John F. Campbell	(Afghanistan) Hibatullah Akhundzada; (Afghanistan) Akhtar Mansour †; Ayman al-Zawahiri; Abu Ibrahim al-Hashimi al-Qurashi (2019–2021); Abu Bakr al-Baghdadi † (2014–19); Hafiz Saeed Khan † (2015–July 2016); Abdul Haseeb Logari † (2016–April 2017); Abdul Rahman Ghaleb † (April–July 2017); Abu Saad Erhabi † (July 2017–August 2018); Abdullah Orokzai (POW) (April 2019–April 2020); Qari Hekmat †; Mufti Nemat (surrendered); Dawood Ahmad Sofi †; Mohamed Zahran †; Ishfaq Ahmed Sofi †

Strength
Peak strength: Resolute Support Mission: 17,178 troops (in October 2019); Afghan National Defense and Security Forces: 307,947 (on January 28, 2021); DoD Contractor Personnel: 39,609 (1st quarter of 2015)	(Afghanistan) Taliban: 58,000-100,000 (As of February 2021)

Casualties and losses
- See War in Afghanistan for full lists

Operation Freedom's Sentinel (OFS) was the official name used by the U.S. government for the mission succeeding Operation Enduring Freedom (OEF) in continuation of the war in Afghanistan as part of the larger global war on terrorism. Operation Freedom's Sentinel was part of the NATO-led Resolute Support Mission, which began on January 1, 2015. OFS had two components: counterterrorism and working with allies as part of Resolute Support.

There were 16,551 NATO and non-NATO troops in Afghanistan around February 2020. Around June 2020, that number dropped to 15,937. In February 2021, there were 9,592 NATO and non-NATO troops in Afghanistan.

The self-reported strength of the Afghan National Security Forces consisted of more than 300,000 personnel during 2020. These forces surrendered or fled to neighbouring countries during the August phase of the 2021 Taliban offensive, leaving nearly all of the country under Taliban control.

Operation Freedom Sentinel was expected to formally end on August 31, 2021, but was de-facto completed one day earlier on August 30, as the last remaining troops withdrew and was officially terminated by the DoD on October 1, 2021 as it officially initiated its successor, Operation Enduring Sentinel.

== Objectives ==
After thirteen years of Operation Enduring Freedom, the U.S. military and NATO allies shifted focus from major military operations to a smaller role of NATO-led training and assistance. While the bulk of the new mission was under the NATO-led Resolute Support Mission (RS), "a separate 'non-NATO' contingent of U.S. forces will participate in force protection, logistical support and counterterrorism activities."

An October 1, 2015, statement by Gen. John F. Campbell, commander, Resolute Support Mission, U.S. Forces-Afghanistan/ISAF, defined the U.S. military's objectives. "U.S. forces are now carrying out two well-defined missions: a Counter-Terrorism (CT) mission against the remnants of Al-Qaeda and the Resolute Support TAA mission in support of Afghan security forces. Our CT and TAA efforts are concurrent and complementary. While we continue to attack the remnants of Al-Qaeda, we are also building the ANDSF so that they can secure the Afghan people, win the peace, and contribute to stability throughout the region."

When OFS started U.S. troop levels in Afghanistan were at 9,800 troops. General Campbell requested an additional 1,000 troops while NATO troop levels were built up to a force of about 13,500. His request was granted. In 2019, U.S. troop levels were at 14,000 troops in combined support of NATO RS missions and OFS. By January 2021, the U.S. had reduced its force level to 2,500 troops. However, it was later revealed that U.S. has 1000 more troops, which include Special Operations forces, than it disclosed in Afghanistan.

Moreover, as of January 2021, there were still approximately 18,000 military contractors, of which a third were U.S. citizens, in Afghanistan President Biden stated on July 8, 2021, that the war in Afghanistan would officially conclude on August 31, 2021. American airstrikes on Taliban members were projected to continue, but ended with the fall of the Islamic Republic.

== Congressional reports ==
The Lead Inspector General for Overseas Contingency Operations (Lead IG) is responsible for submitting a quarterly report on OFS to Congress. The quarterly report describes activities in support of OFS, as well as the work of the Department of Defense, the Department of State, and the United States Agency for International Development to promote the U.S. Government's policy goals in Afghanistan,

Excerpts from the January 1, 2018 – March 30, 2018 report:

“General John Nicholson Jr., Commander of Resolute Support and Commander of U.S. Forces-Afghanistan (USFOR-A) said this quarter that U.S. and Afghan forces were gaining momentum through the new South Asia strategy, and that the Taliban was shifting to "guerilla tactics and suicide attacks" because it was no longer able to carry out attacks to seize cities or districts. However, suicide attacks and bombings in Kabul and across Afghanistan resulted in hundreds of civilian casualties, and raised concerns among Afghans about whether the government can secure the country.”

“The United States faces multiple challenges in Afghanistan. Previous Lead IG quarterly reports identified several challenges facing Afghanistan and the OFS mission, including preparing to hold safe, credible parliamentary elections, defeating ISIS-K, and pressuring Pakistan to eliminate safe havens. During the quarter, the United States and Afghanistan continued to seek to address these challenges, though with limited progress, as detailed throughout this report.

This quarter, Lead IG agencies also observed the following emerging challenges that complicate the OFS mission and efforts to end the conflict:”

- Stemming the Attacks in Kabul
- Managing Increased Violence in Afghanistan
- Pursuing Peace

== See also ==
Operation Allies Refuge – part of the evacuation from Afghanistan
