= Darryl A. Williams =

US Army general (born 1961)

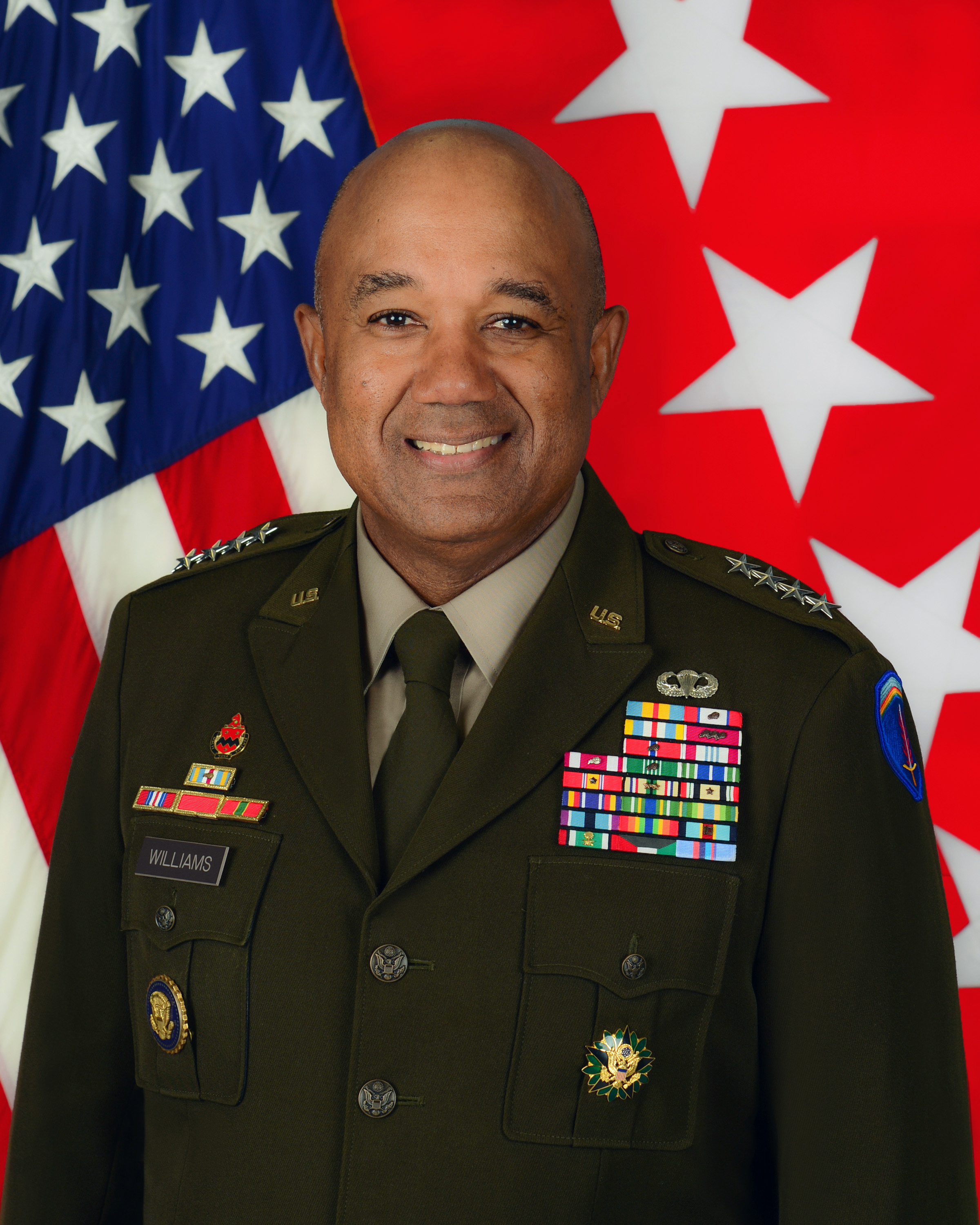
- Williams in 2022

60th Superintendent of the United States Military Academy
- In office 2 July 2018 – 26 June 2022
- President: Donald Trump; Joe Biden
- Preceded by: Robert L. Caslen
- Succeeded by: Steven W. Gilland

Personal details
- Born: 22 June 1961 (age 65) Alexandria, Virginia, U.S.
- Military career
- Education: United States Military Academy (BS); Naval War College (MA); United States Army Command and General Staff College (MMAS)
- Allegiance: United States
- Branch: United States Army
- Service years: 1983–2024
- Rank: General
- Commands: United States Army Europe and Africa; Allied Land Command; United States Military Academy; United States Army Warrior Transition Command; United States Army Africa
- Conflicts: Gulf War; Iraq War
- Awards: Defense Distinguished Service Medal; Army Distinguished Service Medal (2); Defense Superior Service Medal; Legion of Merit (4); Bronze Star Medal (2)
- Darryl A. Williams's voice Darryl A. Williams gives remarks upon becoming the 60th superintendent of West Point; Recorded 2 July 2018

Darryl Anthony Williams (born 22 June 1961) is a retired United States Army general who served as the commanding general of United States Army Europe and Africa and commander of Allied Land Command from 2022 to 2024. He previously served as the 60th Superintendent of the United States Military Academy, the first African-American to hold the position. He served as commander of Allied Land Command as a lieutenant general from 2016 to 2018.

== Early life ==
Williams grew up in Fairfax County, Virginia, and attended Mount Vernon High School playing center for the Majors 1979 state champion basketball team and a defensive end on the football team. Williams graduated in 1979.

== Military career ==
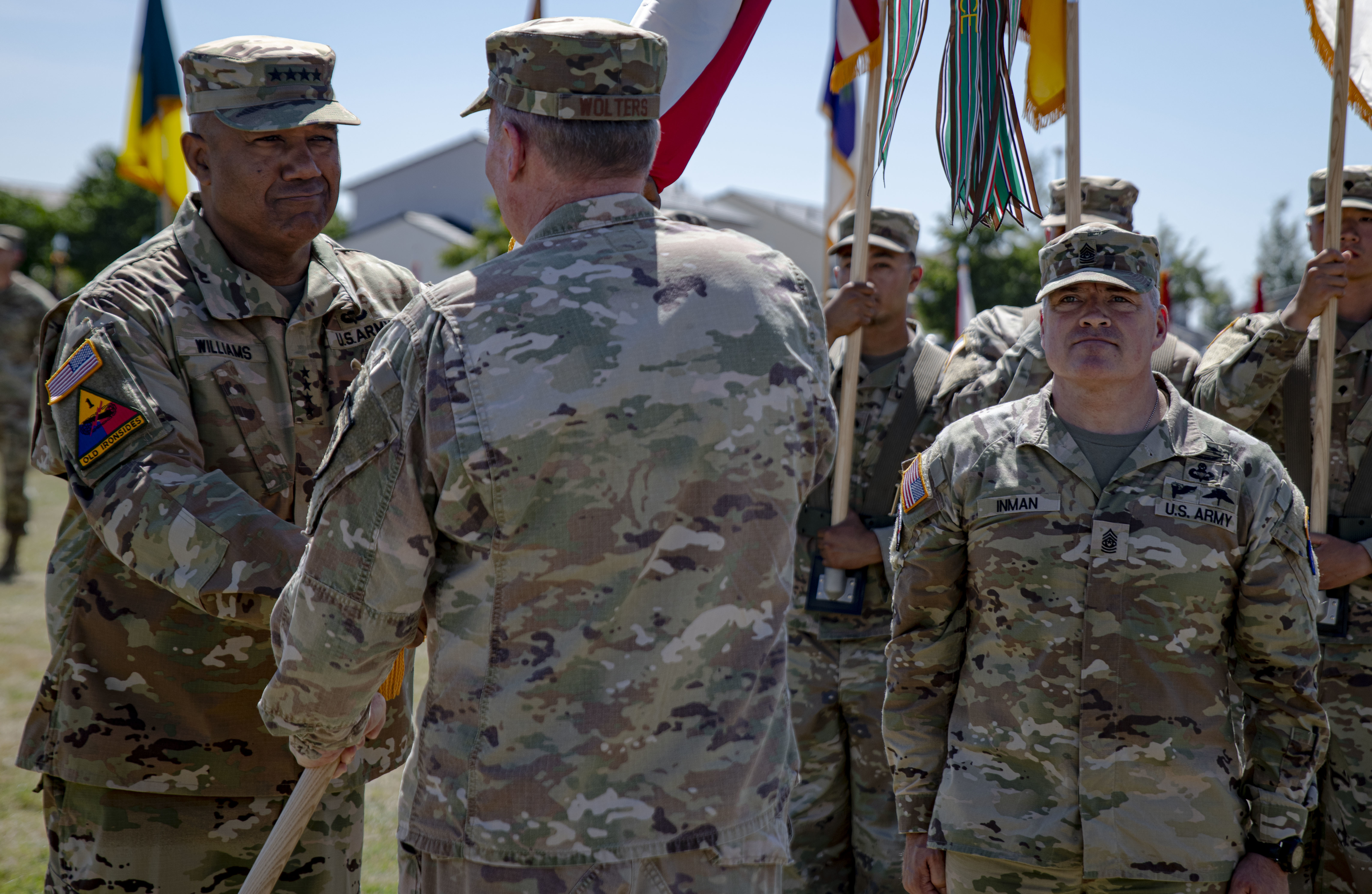
Gen. Williams assumes command as Commanding General, U.S. Army Europe and Africa on 28 June 2022

Williams graduated from the United States Military Academy in December 1983 and was commissioned a second lieutenant of Field Artillery. His first assignment was an executive officer and fire direction officer in Schweinfurt, Germany, with the 3rd Infantry Division. Next, Williams was assigned to XVIII Airborne Corps, deploying to Southwest Asia in support of Operations Desert Shield and Desert Storm. He was then assigned to West Point as a Tactical Officer. Later, Williams served in various command positions in Europe, including commander of United States Army Africa in Vicenza, Italy; deputy chief of staff G3/5/7 of the United States Army in Europe, Wiesbaden, Germany; and commanding general of the United States Army Warrior Transition Command and assistant surgeon general for Warrior Care and Transition.

In 2014, Williams was tapped by President Barack Obama to manage the United States' response to the West African Ebola virus epidemic.

On 24 June 2016, Williams assumed command of NATO Allied Land Command in Turkey.

Williams's military education includes the Field Artillery Officer Basic and Advanced Courses, United States Army Command and General Staff College, School of Advanced Military Studies, and the United States Naval War College. He holds Masters’ degrees in Leadership Development, Military Art and Science, and National Security and Strategic Studies.

In June 2022, Williams was nominated for promotion to general and appointment as Commanding General, U.S. Army Europe and Africa. He replaced Christopher G. Cavoli, who was to take command of the United States European Command, on 28 June 2022. He assumed command of Allied Land Command a second time from Lieutenant General Roger Cloutier on 4 August 2022.

== Awards and decorations ==
Basic Parachutist Badge
Army Staff Identification Badge
Presidential Service Badge
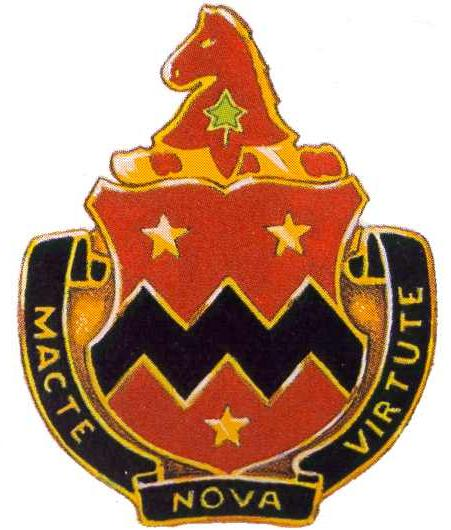
16th Field Artillery Regiment Distinctive Unit Insignia
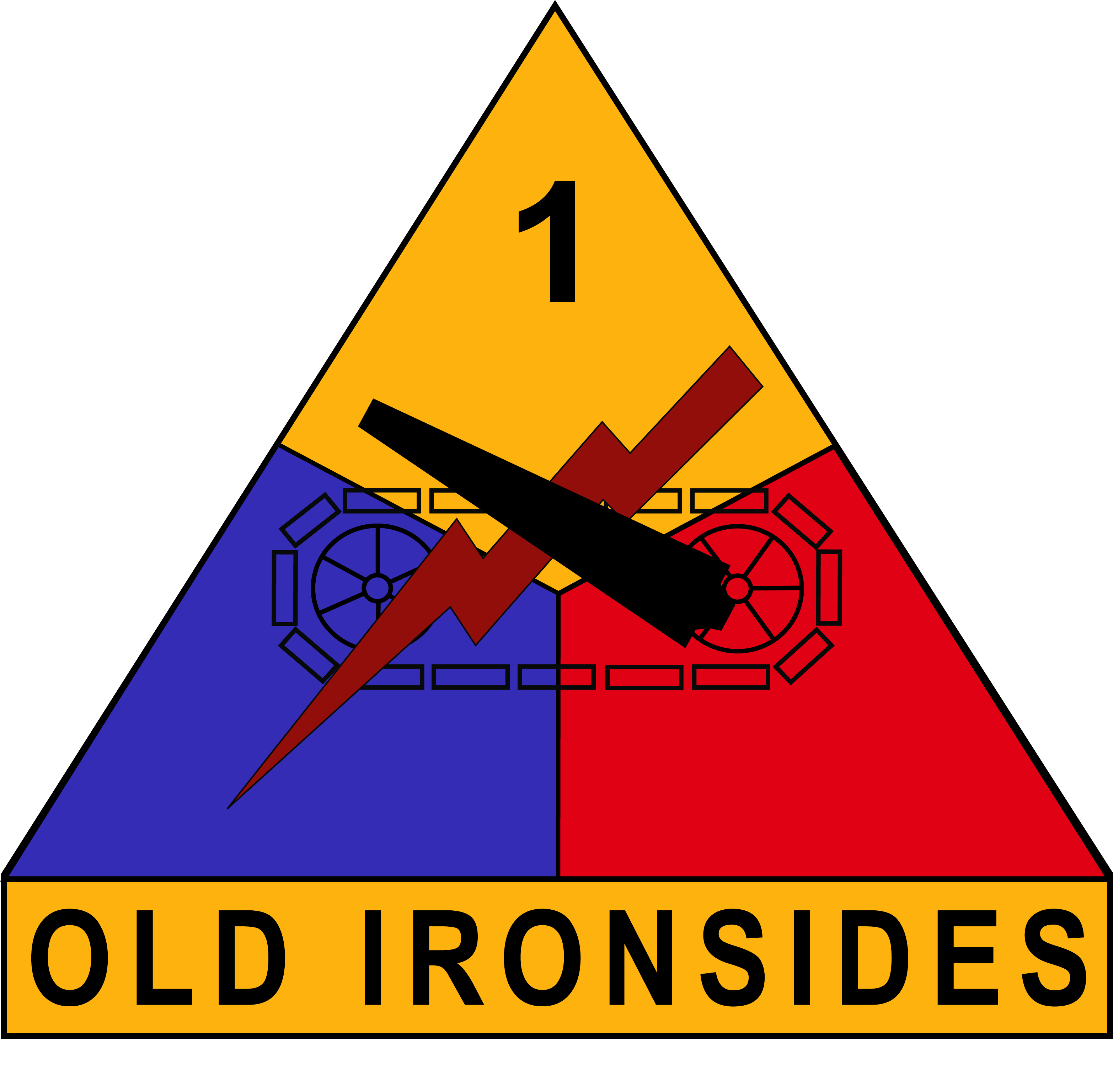
1st Armored Division Shoulder Sleeve Insignia
4 Overseas Service Bars

Defense Distinguished Service Medal
Army Distinguished Service Medal with one bronze oak leaf cluster
Defense Superior Service Medal with oak leaf cluster
Legion of Merit with three oak leaf clusters
Bronze Star Medal with oak leaf cluster
Defense Meritorious Service Medal
Meritorious Service Medal with silver oak leaf cluster
Army Commendation Medal with oak leaf cluster
Army Achievement Medal
Joint Meritorious Unit Award with oak leaf cluster
Valorous Unit Award
Meritorious Unit Commendation
Superior Unit Award
National Defense Service Medal with one bronze service star
Southwest Asia Service Medal with two service stars
Iraq Campaign Medal with service star
Global War on Terrorism Service Medal
Korea Defense Service Medal
Armed Forces Service Medal
Humanitarian Service Medal
Army Service Ribbon
Army Overseas Service Ribbon with bronze award numeral 8
Medal of Honour - Defence General Staff Joint Forces (Italy)
Kuwait Liberation Medal (Saudi Arabia)
Kuwait Liberation Medal (Kuwait)

Military offices
Preceded by Patrick J. Donahue II	Commanding General of United States Army Africa; 2014–2016	Succeeded by Joseph P. Harrington
Preceded by John W. Nicholson Jr.	Commander of Allied Land Command; 2016–2018	Succeeded by Paolo Ruggiero; Acting
Preceded by Robert L. Caslen	60th Superintendent of the United States Military Academy; 2018–2022	Succeeded by Steven W. Gilland
Preceded by Christopher G. Cavoli	Commanding General of United States Army Europe and Africa; 2022–2024	Succeeded by Christopher T. Donahue
Preceded by Roger Cloutier	Commander of Allied Land Command; 2022–2024	Succeeded by Christopher T. Donahue
