= Harry P. Storke =

United States Army general (1905–1985)

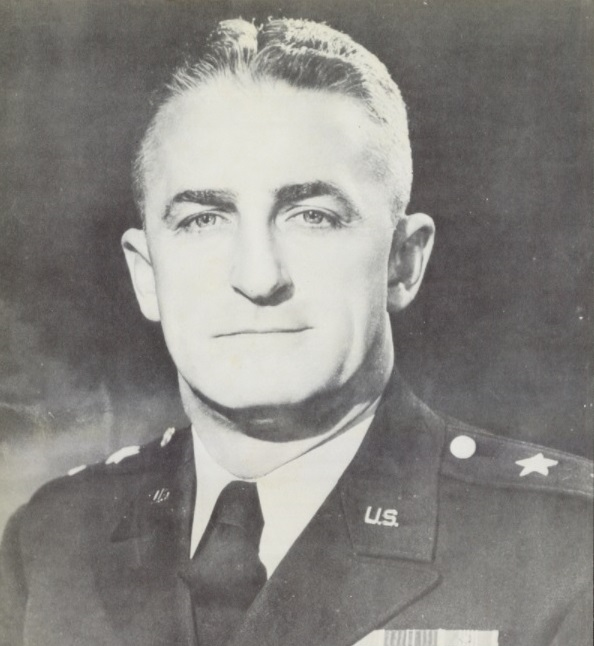
- Storke as a major general in 1959
- Born: 8 March 1905; Baltimore, Maryland, US
- Died: 4 December 1985 (aged 80); Richmond, Virginia, US
- Burial place: Arlington National Cemetery
- Education: United States Military Academy; United States Army Command and General Staff College; National War College
- Spouse(s): Lois Mason Sawyer (m. 1928–1974) Elizabeth Davidson (m. 1975–1985)
- Children: 2
- Military career
- Service: United States Army
- Service years: 1926–1961
- Rank: Lieutenant General
- Service number: 016468
- Unit: US Army Field Artillery Branch
- Commands: Camp Desert Rock; 1st Infantry Division Artillery; 9th Infantry Division; US Army Chief of Information; I Corps; Allied Land Forces South-Eastern Europe
- Wars: World War II; Allied-occupied Austria
- Awards: Army Distinguished Service Medal; Legion of Merit; Bronze Star Medal; Order of the British Empire (Officer); Croix de Guerre (France); Bronze Medal of Military Valor (Italy); Order of the Phoenix (Grand Cross) (Greece)
- Other work: President, Worcester Polytechnic Institute

Harry Purnell Storke (8 March 1905 – 4 December 1985) was a career officer in the United States Army. A veteran of World War II, he served from 1926 to 1961 and attained the rank of lieutenant general. Storke was a recipient of the Army Distinguished Service Medal, Legion of Merit, and Bronze Star Medal, and his commands included the 1st Infantry Division Artillery, 9th Infantry Division, I Corps, and Allied Land Forces South-Eastern Europe. After retiring from the army, Storke served as president of Worcester Polytechnic Institute for eight years.

A native of Baltimore and a 1922 graduate of the McDonogh School, Storke went on to the United States Military Academy at West Point, from which he graduated in 1926. Commissioned as a second lieutenant in the Field Artillery, his initial postings included Artillery units in the US and the Philippines. In the mid to late 1930s, he served as assistant professor of military science for the Reserve Officers' Training Corps at Iowa State University. From the late 1930s to the start of World War II, he was a member of the West Point faculty. During the war, he served in the Mediterranean theatre as a member of the II Corps staff. After the war, he served in Austria as deputy commander for military government of the Vienna Area Command.

Later military assignments Storke completed included commander of Camp Desert Rock, Nevada during the Desert Rock exercises, commander of the 1st Infantry Division Artillery, and commander of Allied Forces Southern Europe. He retired in 1961, and went on to serve as president of Worcester Polytechnic Institute from 1962 to 1969. In retirement, he resided in Williamsburg, Virginia. He died in Richmond, Virginia, on 4 December 1985 and was buried at Arlington National Cemetery.

== Early life ==
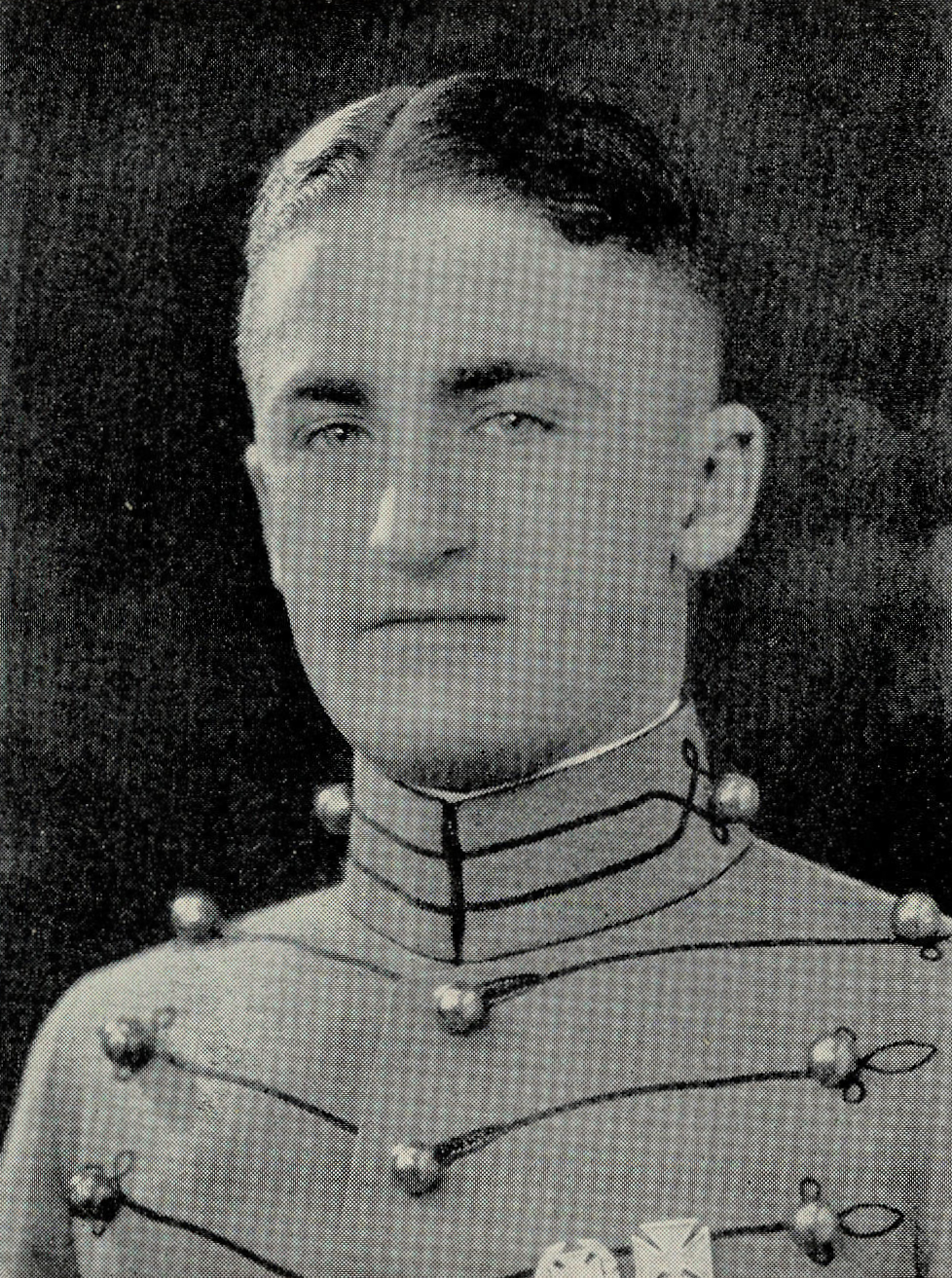
Storke as a Military Academy cadet c. 1926

Storke was born in Baltimore on 8 March 1905, a son of Richard William Storke and Laura Taylor Storke. He was raised and educated in Baltimore and was a 1922 graduate of the McDonogh School. While at McDonogh, he played football, basketball, baseball, and tennis, in addition to being near the top of his class academically. In March 1922, he received an appointment to the United States Military Academy at West Point from US Senator Joseph I. France.

Storke attended West Point from 1922 to 1926 and graduated ranked 99th of 152 and received his commission as a second lieutenant of Field Artillery. Among his classmates who also went on to attain general officer rank were William P. Ennis and Donald Prentice Booth. Among his prominent classmates who did not become generals was John S. Roosma. After graduating he was assigned to 2nd Battalion, 16th Field Artillery Regiment at Fort Bragg, North Carolina.

== Start of career ==
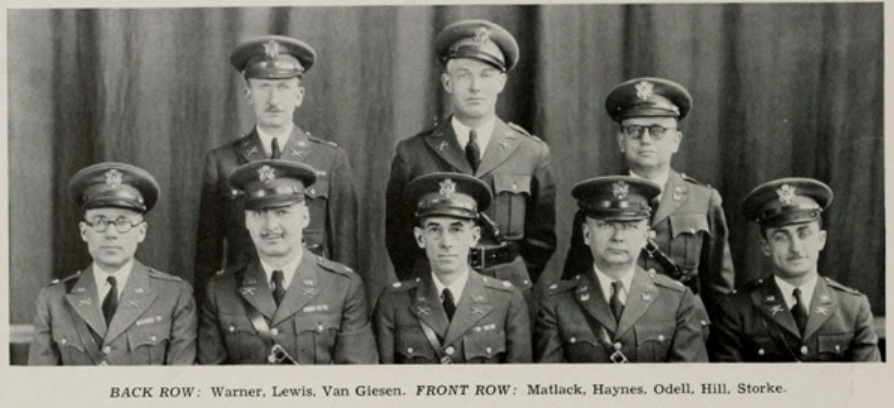
Storke (front row, right) as an Iowa State University ROTC instructor in 1936

From September 1930 to July 1931, Storke was assigned to Fort Sill, Oklahoma as a student in the Field Artillery Officer Basic Course. He was then assigned to the 24th Field Artillery Regiment at Fort Stotsenburg, Philippines, where served until June 1934. Upon returning to the United States, he was assigned as assistant professor of military science and tactics for the Reserve Officers' Training Corps (ROTC) program at Iowa State University, where he remained until June 1938. He received promotion to captain in June 1936.

After his assignment at Iowa State, Storke was assigned to the West Point faculty as an instructor in the English department, where he remained until June 1943. From June 1941 to June 1942 he was secretary of West Point's Association of Graduates, and he was the first editor of Assembly magazine. In 1942, he graduated from the United States Army Command and General Staff College. Storke was promoted to temporary major in January 1941, temporary lieutenant colonel in February 1942, and permanent major in June 1943.

== Continued career ==
In June 1943, Storke was assigned to World War II duty as assistant artillery officer on the staff of II Corps. He took part in combat in the Mediterranean theatre, including the battles of Monte Cassino and Garigliano, the Liberation of Rome, the Gothic Line battles in the Apennine Mountains, and the Battle of Udine. He was promoted to temporary colonel in February 1944. From May to August 1945, he served again as assistant artillery officer on the II Corps staff. From August 1945 to January 1946, Storke was assigned as II Corps' deputy chief of staff.

After the war, Storke took part in Allied-occupied Austria as chief of staff of the Vienna Area Command. From January to July 1946, he was assigned as the Vienna Area Command's deputy commander for military government. From August 1946 to September 1947, Store was assigned as artillery officer on the staff of First U.S. Army at Governors Island, New York. In 1947, his wartime experience led to the award of equivalent credit for attendance at the Armed Forces Staff College. From September 1947 to August 1948, he was First Army's deputy chief of staff for operations (G-3). In July 1948, he received promotion to permanent lieutenant colonel. From September 1948 to June 1949, Storke was a student at the National War College. From June to November 1949, Storke was assigned to duty in the office of the Chairman of the Joint Chiefs of Staff. Beginning in November 1949, he served in Europe as a member of the NATO Standing Working Group, where he helped form the NATO staff and a member of the US Joint Working Team, where he helped organize the United States European Command. He was promoted to colonel in June 1950.

== Later career ==
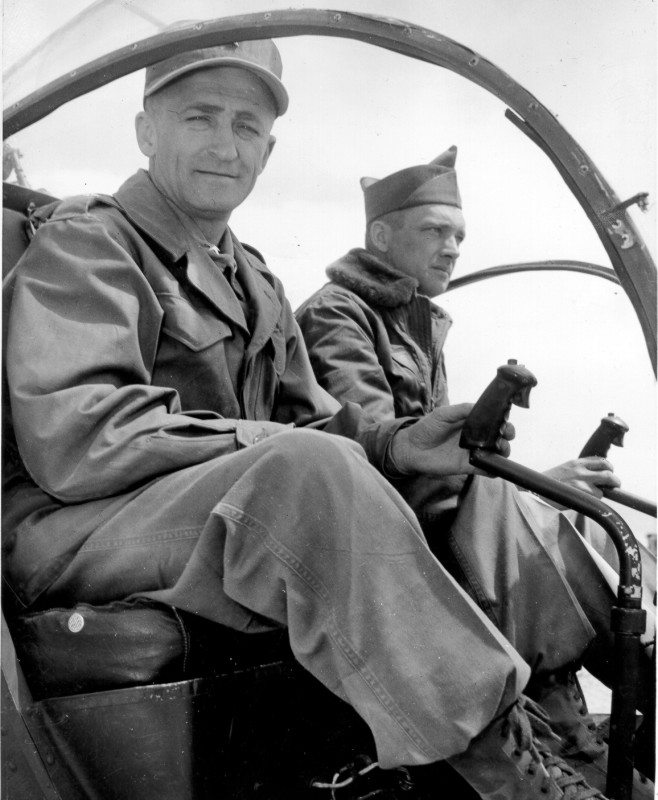
Storke (left) and pilot take off for inspection flight over Camp Desert Rock after nuclear blast in April 1952

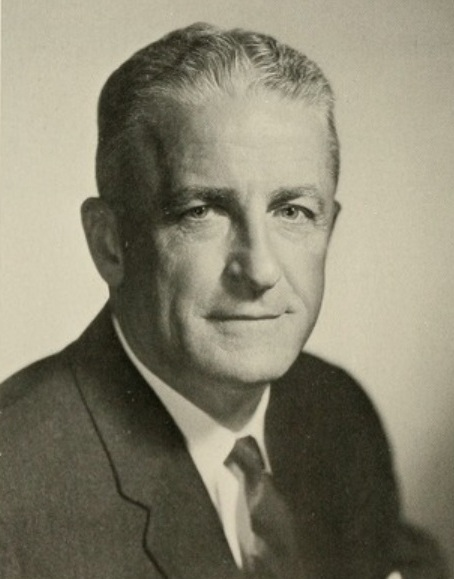
Storke as WPI president in 1969

After promotion to brigadier general in 1952, Storke commanded Camp Desert Rock, Nevada during the Desert Rock exercises that trained the post-atomic bomb army to conduct operations on a nuclear battlefield. He subsequently commanded the 1st Infantry Division Artillery in West Germany. After promotion to major general in 1954, he was assigned as assistant chief of staff for logistics (G-4) on the staff of United States Army Europe. From June 1956 to September 1957, he commanded the 9th Infantry Division. From 1957 to 1959, he served as the army's Chief of Information. From 1959 to 1960, Storke was assigned to South Korea as commander of I Corps. In January 1960, he received promotion to lieutenant general and assignment as commander of Allied Land Forces South-Eastern Europe. Storke served in this position until retiring for disability in August 1961.

After retiring from the army, Storke was appointed president of Worcester Polytechnic Institute, and he served until 1969. His WPI leadership was marked by efforts to modernize its curriculum. Storke's strategy, the WPI Plan, replaced previous academic infrastructure, including the grading system and major degree requirements, with project work and hands on application. In addition, he was president during the university's yearlong centennial observance in 1964 and 1965, which included a capital fund campaign that financed the addition of Goddard Hall, the George C. Gordon Library, Harrington Auditorium, and the Stoddard and Ellsworth-Fuller Residence Centers. During Storke's administration, the student body expanded, which included the admission of women as undergraduates beginning in 1968.

In retirement, Storke resided in Williamsburg, Virginia. He died at the Richmond VA Medical Center in Richmond, Virginia, on 4 December 1985. Storke was buried at Arlington National Cemetery.

== Awards ==
Storke's awards included the Army Distinguished Service Medal, Legion of Merit, Bronze Star Medal, Order of the British Empire (Officer), French Croix de Guerre, Italian Bronze Medal of Military Valor, and Greek Order of the Phoenix (Grand Cross).

In addition to his military awards, in 1962, Storke received the honorary degree of LL.D. from American International College in Springfield, Massachusetts. In 1965, he received an honorary D.Litt. degree from the College of the Holy Cross. Also in 1965, Storke received an honorary Doctor of Engineering degree from Worcester Polytechnic Institute. In 1965, he was made an honorary member of the Alpha Phi Omega fraternity.

=== Army Distinguished Service Medal citation ===
Lieutenant General Harry P. Storke distinguished himself by eminently meritorious conduct in the performance of outstanding to the Government in successive positions of great responsibility during the period July 1953 to August 1961. From July 1953 to August 1960, General Storke served consecutively as Commanding general, 1st Infantry Division Artillery, United States Army Europe; Assistant Chief of Staff, G-4, Headquarters, United States Army Europe; Commanding General, 9th Infantry Division and, concurrently, Commanding General, Fort Carson, Colorado; Chief of Public Information, Office of the Secretary of the Army and concurrently, Chief of Information, Office of the Chief of Staff; and as Commanding General I Corps (Group) in Korea. In each of these key command and staff assignments, General Storke's dynamic leadership, superior professional competence, and thorough knowledge of military tactics, strategy, and administration immeasurably enhanced the overall successful accomplishment of important objectives of vital military, national and international significance. The mature judgment, resourceful leadership and dedicated devotion to duty which he constantly displayed resulted in the prompt and effective resolution of diversified and complex operational problem areas, and made valuable contributions to the development of improved policies to meet the rapid change and advancement of modern military doctrine and technology in the national defense effort. General Storke culminated his brilliant career as Commanding General of the United States Army Element, and concurrently as Commander of Allied land Forces, Southeastern Europe. His skillful diplomacy, imaginative perception and unselfish application to duty insured the smooth and orderly conduct of all activities within the scope of his responsibility, and his staunch determination gained increased stability and materially strengthened the posture of that international command during a period of accentuated global tension. The warm spirit of friendly cooperation and deep sense of responsibility which he manifested consistently gained optimal results, and earned the high regard and admiration of all associated with him. General Storke's distinguished performance of duty throughout this period represents outstanding achievement in the most cherished traditions of the United States Army, and reflects distinct credit upon himself and the military service.

Date: 31 August 1961 Period: July 1953 to August 1961 Organization: Headquarters, Department of the Army

== Works by ==
- "As We Merge" (PDF). The Field Artillery Journal. Washington, DC: U.S. Field Artillery Association. March–April 1947. pp. 114–117.

== Dates of rank ==
- Second Lieutenant, 12 June 1926
- First Lieutenant, 16 January 1932
- Captain, 12 June 1936
- Major (Army of the United States), 31 January 1941
- Lieutenant Colonel (Army of the United States), 10 February 1942
- Major, 12 June 1943
- Colonel (Army of the United States), 10 February 1944
- Lieutenant Colonel, 15 July 1948
- Colonel, 29 June 1950
- Brigadier General (Army of the United States), 1 March 1952
- Brigadier General, 10 October 1954
- Major General, 10 November 1954
- Lieutenant General, 26 January 1960
- Lieutenant General (Retired), 31 August 1961
