= Roger Cloutier =

U.S. Army general

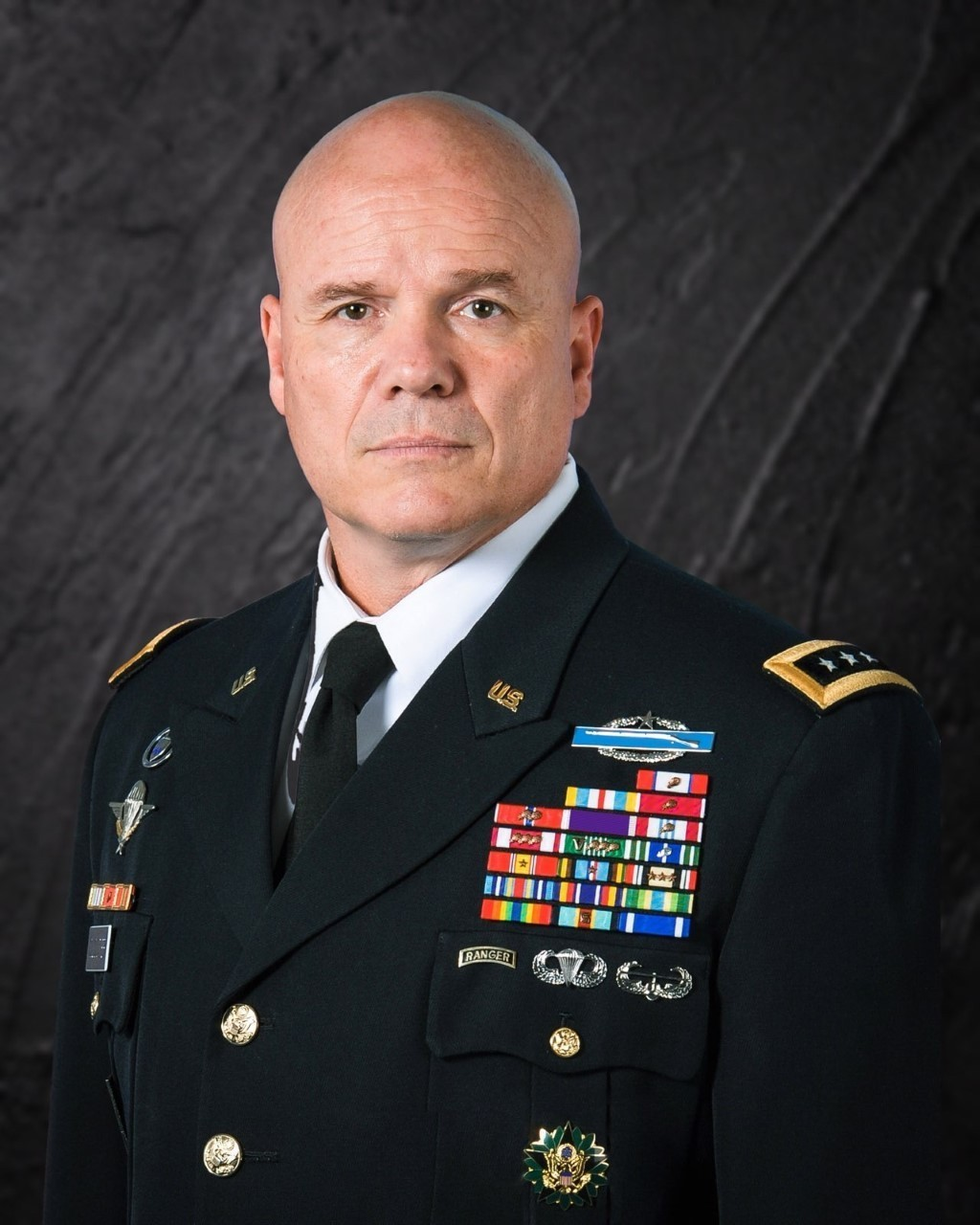
- Born: March 15, 1965 (age 61); Lewiston, Maine, U.S.
- Military career
- Allegiance: United States
- Branch: United States Army
- Service years: 1988–2022
- Rank: Lieutenant General
- Commands: Allied Land Command; United States Army Africa; 1st Brigade, 3rd Infantry Division; 1st Battalion, 30th Infantry Regiment
- Conflicts: Iraq War
- Awards: Defense Distinguished Service Medal; Army Distinguished Service Medal (2); Defense Superior Service Medal (2); Legion of Merit (2); Bronze Star Medal (3)

Roger L. Cloutier Jr. (born March 15, 1965) is a retired United States Army lieutenant general who last served as the Commander of Allied Land Command. Previously, he served as the Commander of the United States Army Africa and the Southern European Task Force. Cloutier graduated from the University of San Diego in 1988 with a bachelor's degree in political science and a masters in international relations. He also served as a Col. at Fort Stewart,GA leading multiple deployments of the 3rd I.D 1BCT to Southern Baghdad,Iraq.

== Rumors of capture ==
In April 2022, unconfirmed sources began circulating that Cloutier had been captured by Russian forces in Mariupol whilst training the Azov Battalion. NATO stated that this information was false. Following the claims a rebuttal was made as an online post via Cloutier's LinkedIn profile.

== Military Awards ==
- Defense Distinguished Medal
- Defense Superior Service Medal with Oak Leaf Cluster
- Legion of Merit with Oak Leaf Cluster
- Bronze Star Medal with two Oak Leaf Clusters
- Defence Meritorious Service Medal
- Meritorious Service Medal with three Oak Leaf Clusters
- Army Commendation Medal with "V" Device
- Army Commendation Medal with three Oak Leaf Clusters
- Army Achievement Medal with five Oak Leaf Clusters

Military offices
Preceded by John M. Murray	Director of Force Management of the United States Army; 2013–2015	Succeeded by Randy A. George
Preceded by Bradley Becker	Commanding General of the United States Army Training Center and Fort Jackson; 2015–2016	Succeeded by John P. Johnson
Preceded by Michael J. Kingsley	Chief of Staff of the United States Africa Command; 2016–2018	Succeeded by Todd B. McCaffrey
Preceded by Eugene J. LeBoeuf; Acting	Commander of the United States Army Africa; 2019–2020	Succeeded by Andrew M. Rohling
Preceded by John C. Thomson III	Commander of the Allied Land Command; 2020–2022	Succeeded by Darryl A. Williams
