= Jez Bennett =

British Army general (born 1968)

Lieutenant General Jeremy Bennett CB CBE
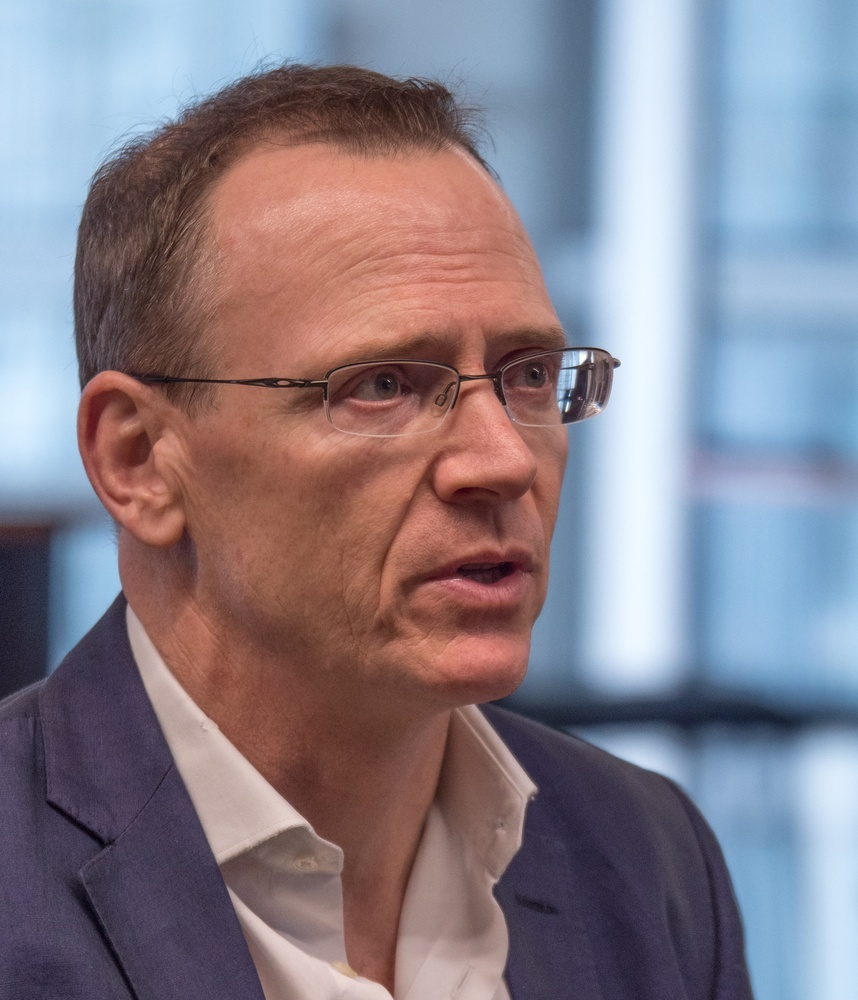
- Bennett in 2019
- Born: October 1968 (age 57); Amersham, Buckinghamshire, England
- Military career
- Allegiance: United Kingdom
- Branch: British Army
- Service years: 1988–present
- Rank: Lieutenant General
- Nickname: Jez Bennett
- Service number: 530856
- Commands: 1st Regiment Royal Horse Artillery; 1st Artillery Brigade
- Conflicts: Bosnian War; Iraq War; War in Afghanistan
- Awards: Companion of the Order of the Bath; Commander of the Order of the British Empire

Lieutenant General Jeremy Matthew James Bennett, CB, CBE (born 1968) is a senior British Army officer, currently serving as Deputy Commander of the Allied Land Command headquartered in İzmir.

== Early life ==
Bennett was born in November 1968 in Amersham, Buckinghamshire. He attended Royal Grammar School, High Wycombe, where he joined the Cadets. He graduated in 1988 and attended the University of Liverpool and the University of Bordeaux to study French.

== Military career ==
Bennett entered into an undergraduate cadetship as a second lieutenant after leaving school, where the British Army would pay for his tuition fees in exchange for mandatory service. In 1991, he was commissioned as a second lieutenant in the Parachute Regiment. He was promoted to lieutenant a year later.

Bennett transferred from the Parachute Regiment to the Royal Horse Artillery in 1993, where he did a tour of the Bosnian War as a forward observation officer.

He was promoted to captain in 1995. After his tour ended, Jez became a platoon commander at Royal Military Academy Sandhurst, training officer cadets. Bennett was promoted to major in 1999. He obtained a master's degree in defence and went to work for the Ministry of Defence in the Resource & Plans department.

In 2005, he went back to serving in the field with the 1st Regiment Royal Horse Artillery. This included a six-month tour in Cyprus under Operation TOSCA, and another six-month tour in Iraq two years later under Operation TELIC X. He was promoted to lieutenant colonel after his tours ended in 2008, and he returned to Sandhurst as a company commander.

He was appointed commanding officer of 1RHA in 2009, where his responsibilities included leading joint 11 Brigade training exercises and the ISTAR Group in Helmand, Afghanistan. He left this position in 2011, being succeeded by Mike Elviss, and was appointed Colonel Army Plans in the Ministry of Defence.

In 2014, Bennett was promoted to brigadier and appointed commander of the 1st Artillery Brigade and Headquarters South West. He left this role in 2016 to join the Ministry of Defence as Head of Capability Plans in the Finance & Military Capability department.

His next appointment was Chief of Staff of the Allied Rapid Reaction Corps, a NATO force, in December 2018, also being promoted to major general. Bennett was then chosen to be colonel commandant of the Royal Artillery, a post which he served between 2019-2022. In August 2019, he became Director of Capability for the British Army.

=== LANDCOM ===
In December 2024, he was made deputy commander of the Allied Land Command, and was promoted to lieutenant general.

He was appointed a Companion of the Order of the Bath (CB) in the 2026 New Year Honours. In July 2026, he became acting commander of Allied Land Command after the early retirement of Chris Donahue. As acting commander, Bennett hosted the Land Corps Commanders' Conference on 10 and 11 September 2026, which involved 30 senior military leaders from the land forces of NATO countries.

Military offices
Preceded by Nicola Zanelli	Deputy Commander of Allied Land Command; 2024–present	Incumbent
Preceded by Chris Donahue	Commander of Allied Land Command; Acting; 2026–present	Incumbent
