= Chris Donahue =

American general (born 1969)

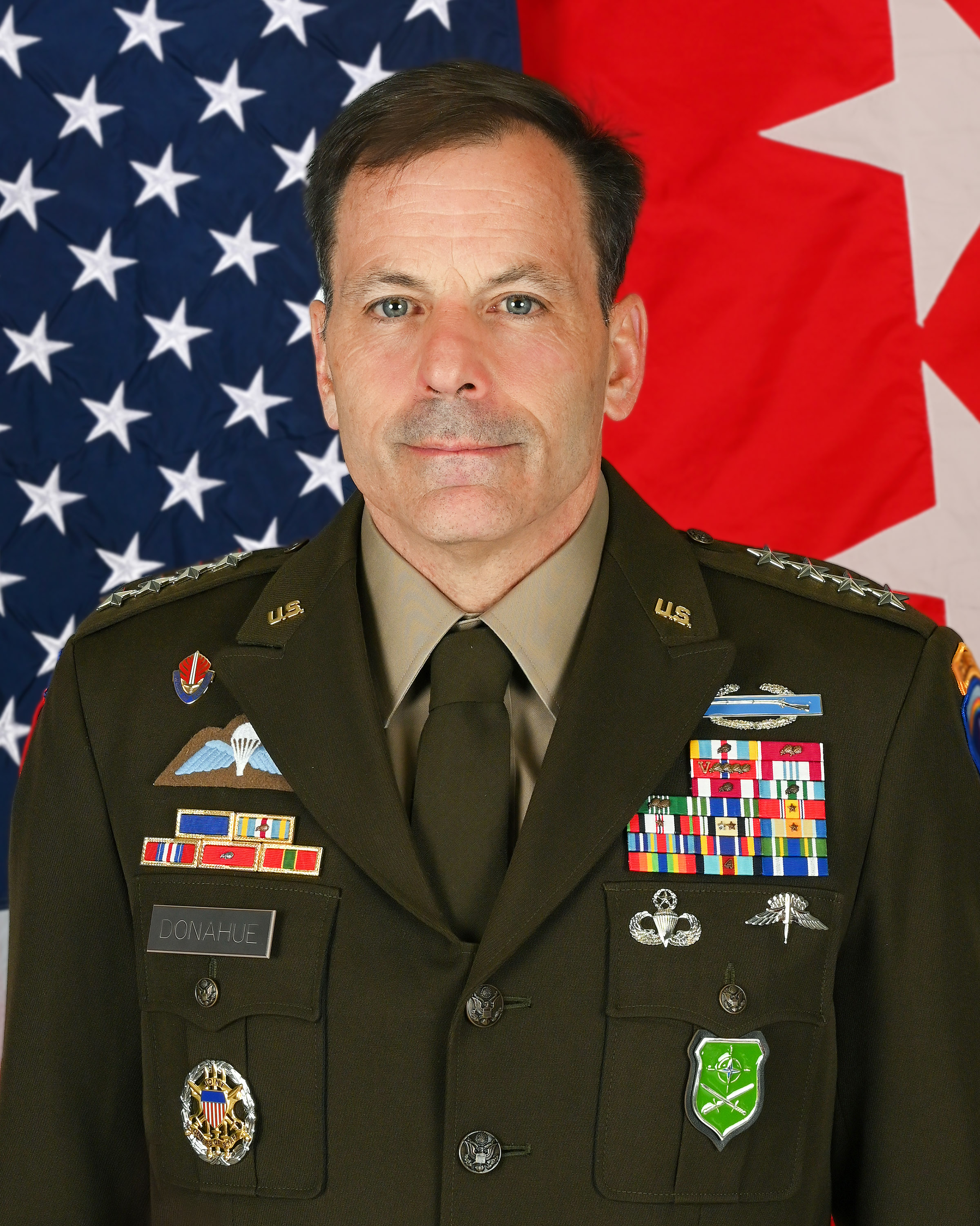
- Official portrait, 2024
- Born: Christopher Todd Donahue; 13 August 1969 (age 57); Chambersburg, Pennsylvania, U.S.
- Education: United States Military Academy; Naval War College
- Military career
- Allegiance: United States
- Branch: United States Army
- Service years: 1992–2026
- Rank: General
- Nickname: "C. D."
- Commands: United States Army Europe and Africa; Allied Land Command; XVIII Airborne Corps; 82nd Airborne Division; NATO Special Operations Component Command–Afghanistan; Delta Force
- Conflicts: War in Afghanistan; Iraq War; War against the Islamic State; Operation Inherent Resolve
- Awards: Defense Superior Service Medal (2); Legion of Merit (3); Bronze Star Medal (5)

Christopher Todd Donahue (born 13 August 1969) is a retired American general who last served as the commanding general of United States Army Europe and Africa and commander of Allied Land Command from 2024 to 2026.

Donahue was born and raised in Pennsylvania. He graduated from the United States Military Academy in 1992. After receiving his commission and serving as an Infantry officer, Donahue went on to spend over two decades in the United States Army Special Operations Command. He became a member of Delta Force in 2002 and later commanded the unit from 2013 to 2015. Donahue was on constant deployments during that time, which included leading Delta Force units in Iraq and Afghanistan, and working with the Central Intelligence Agency on missions in Iraq, Afghanistan, Libya, and Syria. He also served as commandant of the U.S. Army Infantry School in 2017, and as commander of the NATO Special Operations Component Command–Afghanistan from 2019 to 2020. Donahue's awards include two Bronze Stars with valor.

In 2021, while commanding the 82nd Airborne Division, he was in charge of security at the airport in Kabul and was one of the commanders of the international evacuation from Afghanistan. Donahue was the last foreign soldier to leave Afghanistan during the fall of Kabul. After serving as commander of the 82nd Airborne from 2020 to 2022, he was the commanding general of the XVIII Airborne Corps and Fort Bragg from 2022 to 2024. While on a deployment to Europe during the 2022 Russian invasion of Ukraine, he developed a partnership with leaders of the Ukrainian Armed Forces that became critical in the United States and NATO assistance to that country. Donahue had a role in setting up the Security Assistance Group–Ukraine in the fall of 2022, and as commander of Army Europe and Africa, he again oversaw assistance to Ukraine. He was also involved in the creation and development of the NATO Eastern Flank Deterrence Initiative.

== Early life and education ==
Christopher Todd Donahue was born in Pennsylvania, on 13 August 1969, and is a native of Chambersburg. He graduated from Pennsylvania's Chambersburg Area Senior High School, where he had been on the football team, and then attended Wyoming Seminary. In 1988 he began attendance at the United States Military Academy at West Point, New York. He graduated in 1992 and was commissioned as a second lieutenant into the Infantry Branch of the United States Army. He also completed the Infantry Officer Basic and Advanced Courses.

== Early military career ==
His first assignment was as a rifle platoon leader with the 20th Infantry Regiment, 2nd Infantry Division, Eighth Army in South Korea in 1993, followed by service at Fort Polk, Louisiana, with the 509th Infantry Regiment in 1994, and 3rd Ranger Battalion, 75th Ranger Regiment, as a company executive officer from 1994 to 1996. Donahue then received assignment as rifle company commander in the 5th Battalion, 87th Infantry Regiment, 193rd Infantry Brigade in Fort Kobbe, Panama. In 1998 Donahue transferred to 2nd Ranger Battalion, 75th Ranger Regiment, until 2001; as assistant operations officer, rifle company commander, and headquarters company commander. He was then assigned to Washington, D.C., as special assistant to the chairman of the Joint Chiefs of Staff until 2002. In 2002 Donahue volunteered for and completed a specialized selection and operator training course for assignment to the army's 1st Special Forces Operational Detachment – Delta, publicly known as Delta Force, at Fort Bragg, North Carolina. He would serve numerous leadership positions as assistant operations officer, squadron operations officer, squadron executive officer, troop commander, selection and training detachment commander, operations officer, squadron commander, deputy commander and unit commander.

=== 9/11 attacks ===
On the morning of 11 September 2001, Donahue, who was a captain at that time, was on Capitol Hill accompanying Vice Chairman of the Joint Chiefs of Staff General Richard Myers, to whom he was an aide. Myers was scheduled to meet Georgia Senator Max Cleland for a courtesy call before his Senate confirmation hearing to be the next chairman of the Joint Chiefs of Staff. Later-on, Donahue received first-hand intelligence report that a hijacked plane had hit the south tower of the World Trade Center and informed Myers of the hijacking and the current situation. At one point Donahue also lent his cell phone to Myers who used it to call General Ralph Eberhart, the Commander-in-Chief of the North American Aerospace Defense Command, to get further information regarding the situation. Immediately, Donahue and Myers proceeded to The Pentagon. When Myers' Lincoln Town Car had almost arrived at The Pentagon, Donahue informed Myers that he saw smoke arise from The Pentagon and at that point they learned that The Pentagon had also been hit by one of the commercial aircraft that was hijacked that day, later identified to be American Airlines Flight 77. They arrived at The Pentagon a few moments after the plane had hit, and immediately rendezvoused with Secretary of Defense Donald Rumsfeld and Deputy Secretary of Defense Paul Wolfowitz. Myers was designated as Acting-Chairman of the Joint Chiefs of Staff at the time of the attack, because Chairman General Hugh Shelton was en route to Europe for an upcoming NATO summit, and Donahue remained with him throughout the day.

== Senior military career ==
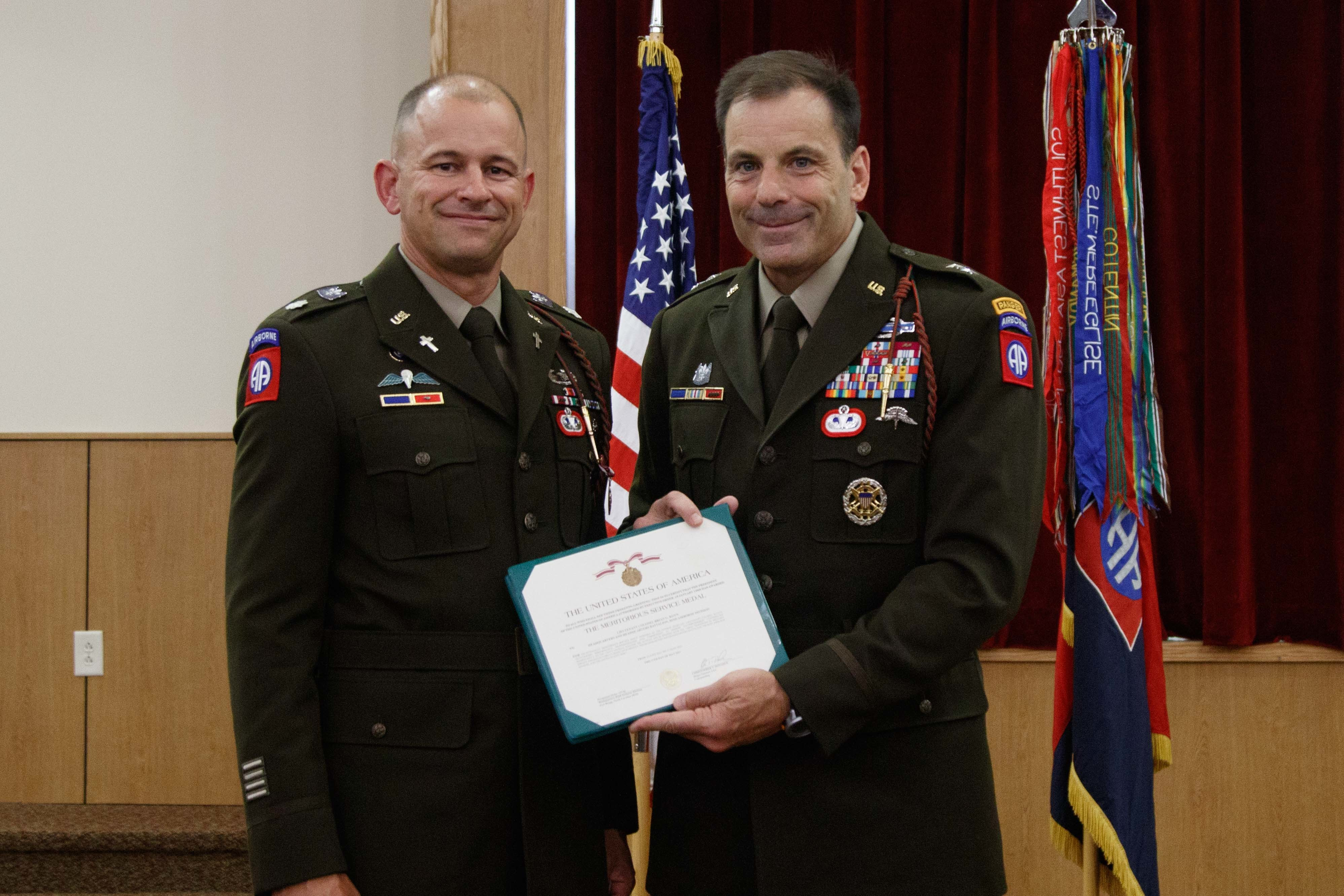
Donahue presents an award to CH (LTC) Brian Koyn for his religious leadership of the 82nd Airborne Division on 8 June 2021.

After his time at The Pentagon, Donahue served in the United States Army Special Operations Command (USASOC) and held commands at levels from a troop to a brigade. He also served as the officer in charge of Delta Force selection around 2009. He had deployments at every rank that he held from captain to major general, which took place during Operation Enduring Freedom, Operation Iraqi Freedom, Operation New Dawn, Operation Freedom's Sentinel, and Operation Inherent Resolve. Donahue worked with the Central Intelligence Agency in Syria, Libya, Iraq and Afghanistan, and spent much of his special operations career in Iraq and Syria. During that time, his commands reportedly included a Delta Force troop during the Iraq War and a Delta Force squadron during the War in Afghanistan. He also directed covert operations in Libya after the fall of Gaddafi, and in Syria, Donahue built a partnership with Kurdish groups during the war against the Islamic State.

Donahue's awards include five Bronze Stars, two of them with the "V" device for valor in combat. He earned a master's degree from the Naval Command and Staff College, Naval War College; and completed an Army War College Fellowship at Harvard University in 2013. After attending Harvard, Colonel Donahue was a brigade commander in USASOC, commanding Delta Force from 2013 to 2015, before becoming the director of operations at Joint Special Operations Command (JSOC). He was later the commandant of the United States Army Infantry School at Fort Benning, from August to October 2017, and was promoted to brigadier general in September. Donahue was deputy commanding general (maneuver) of the 4th Infantry Division at Fort Carson, from October 2017 to May 2018, and was deployed to Europe as part of Operation Atlantic Resolve. Donahue was then deputy director for Special Operations and Counterterrorism, J-37 Joint Staff, from May 2018 to May 2019; and commanding general, NATO Special Operations Component Command/Special Operations Joint Task Force-Afghanistan, Resolute Support Mission, from May 2019 to May 2020. In the latter role, he was deployed to Afghanistan again in support of Operation Freedom's Sentinel.

=== 82nd Airborne Division ===
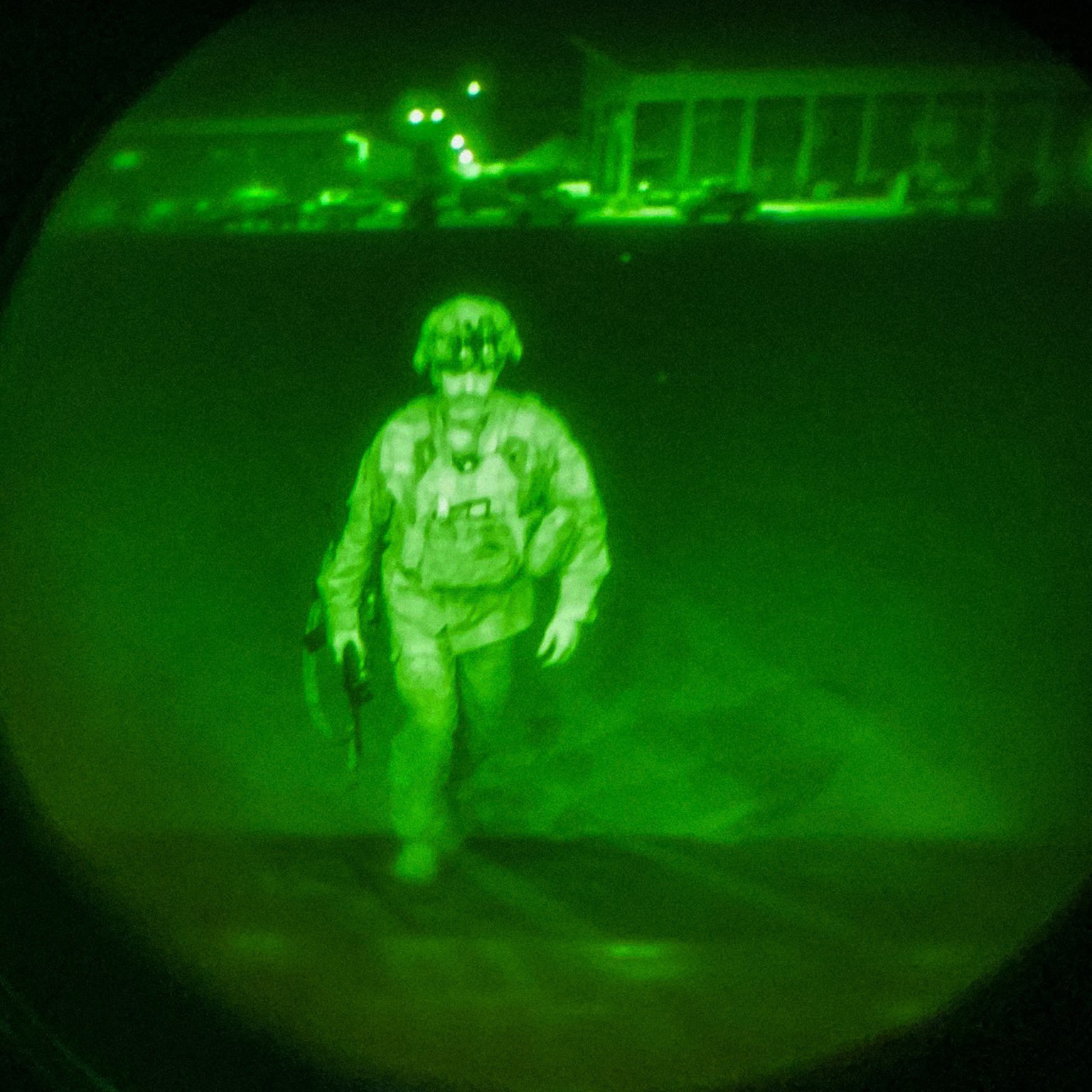
Donahue boards a C-17 cargo plane at the Kabul airport in 2021 as the final international soldier to depart Afghanistan.

Major General Donahue was the Commanding General, 82nd Airborne Division, from July 2020 to March 2022. Donahue was on his fourth deployment to Afghanistan since 2002, and his 18th deployment overall, during the fall of Kabul to the Taliban. He directed security at Hamid Karzai International Airport from 17 August 2021 while Rear Admiral Peter Vasely was in overall command of U.S. forces in the country. Soldiers of the 82nd Airborne held the airport for the final 48 hours of the war in Afghanistan. On 30 August 2021, Donahue became the last foreign soldier to depart, boarding a C-17 transport aircraft that was part of the group of the last five American planes that left the country. Donahue and Vasely had overseen the international evacuation from Kabul of over 122,000 people.

=== XVIII Airborne Corps ===
In February 2022, he was nominated for promotion to lieutenant general and assignment as commanding general of the XVIII Airborne Corps, succeeding Michael Kurilla. In March 2022 Donahue led troops of the XVIII Airborne Corps in southeast Poland in response to the Russian invasion of Ukraine. Shortly after that, he met with senior Ukrainian military commanders to begin their partnership with the United States. This included providing Ukraine with intelligence and armaments. The XVIII Airborne Corps under Donahue was tasked with delivering the armaments and training the Ukrainians on their use by Defense Secretary Lloyd Austin and Chairman of the Joint Chiefs of Staff Mark Milley. He initially worked with Ukrainian Ground Forces commander Oleksandr Syrskyi before working with another Ukrainian general, Mykhailo Zabrodskyi. The partnership that developed between Donahue and Zabrodskyi became critical in the military support from the U.S. and other NATO countries to Ukraine. This took place at the U.S. Army Europe and Africa headquarters in Wiesbaden, Germany, where the U.S. and other NATO military and intelligence officers set up facilities for managing the operation in support of Ukraine. Donahue and NATO Supreme Allied Commander Europe Christopher G. Cavoli advised the Ukrainians throughout the year, including during the Kharkiv and the Kherson counteroffensives.

Towards the end of the year, Donahue and the XVIII Airborne Corps were replaced in this role by Antonio Aguto, who became the head of the Security Assistance Group-Ukraine. Donahue helped establish the group in late 2022, which was created for the purpose of continuing the mission that the XVIII Airborne Corps had done up until then for the long term. In 2023, while back in the United States, Donahue oversaw the renaming of Fort Bragg as Fort Liberty. He deployed the expeditionary headquarters of XVIII Airborne Corps to assist United States Africa Command with evacuating American and other foreign citizens from Sudan during the crisis in that country.

=== Army Europe and Africa ===
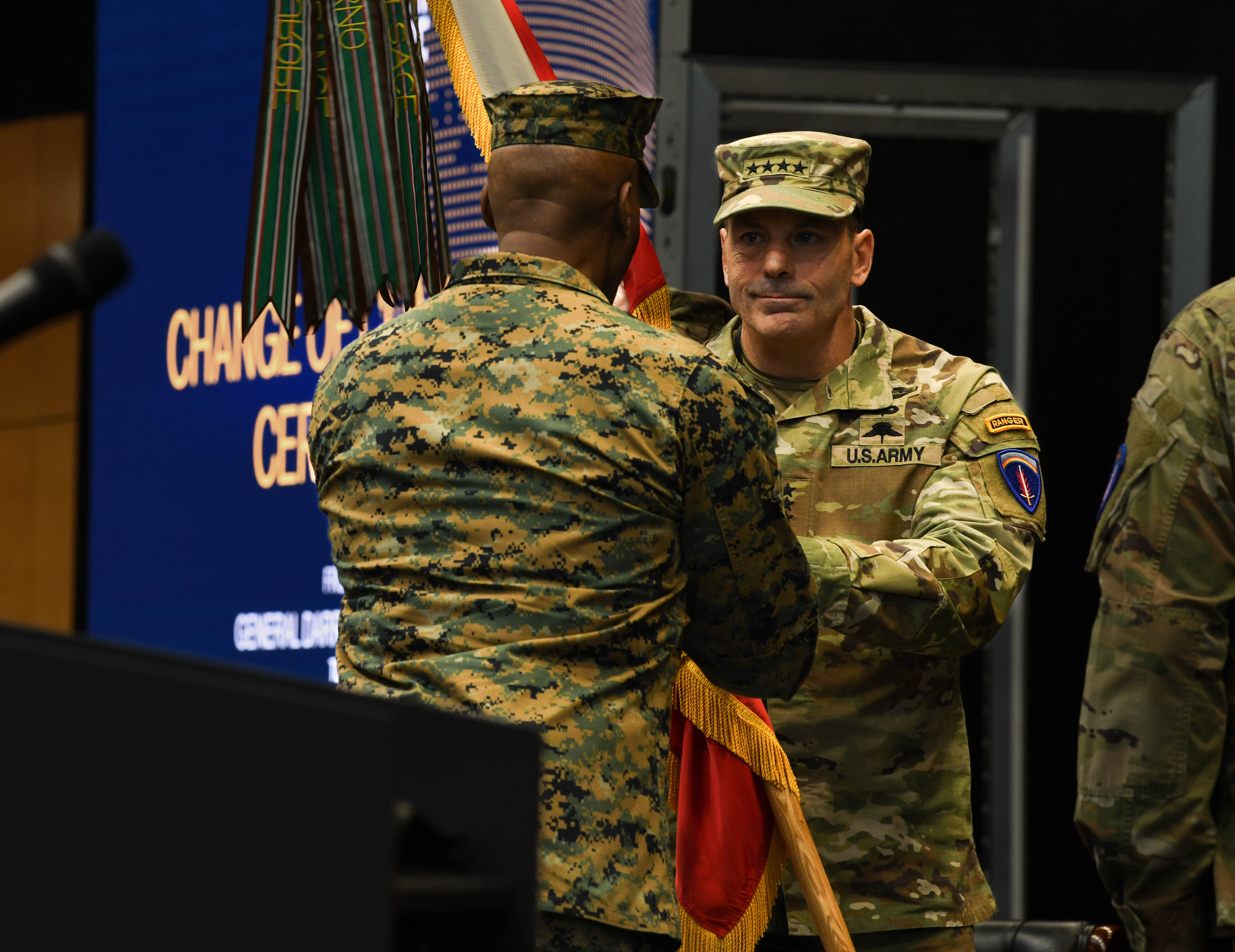
Donahue takes command of U.S. Army Europe-Africa from Darryl A. Williams on 10 December 2024.

In November 2024, Donahue was nominated for promotion to general and assignment as the commanding general of United States Army Europe-Africa and Allied Land Command. The nomination was placed on hold due to senatorial questions regarding his handling of the withdrawal of U.S. forces from Afghanistan in 2021. On 2 December 2024, the hold was lifted, and Donahue was promoted to four-star general. Donahue assumed command from Darryl A. Williams on 10 December 2024. In this position, he returned to the role of overseeing the U.S. assistance to Ukraine, and he visited the country with Cavoli in January 2025.

In June 2025, he said that companies need to test their gear in the Russo-Ukrainian war if they want to get defense contracts. At the LANDEURO Security Conference in July 2025, Donahue announced NATO's establishment of the "Eastern Flank Deterrence Line," relying on common launchers and certain coordination and decision-making systems based on the cloud and artificial intelligence. He said that "the mass and momentum problem that Russia poses to us ... we've developed the capability to make sure that we can stop that mass and momentum problem." He also asserted that the alliance is capable of neutralizing Russia's anti-access/area denial capabilities in the Kaliningrad Oblast.

In November 2025 he was part of a delegation led by U.S. Army Secretary Daniel Driscoll to Ukraine for peace negotiations in the Russo-Ukrainian war. In January 2026, Donahue was interviewed by Fox News host Brian Kilmeade at the U.S. Army base in Wiesbaden, Germany, where he showed Kilmeade how the lessons of the Russo-Ukrainian war are being studied by the Army. On 30 June 2026, Donahue announced that the authority for NATO land operations in Estonia and Latvia has been transferred from Multinational Corps Northeast to the 1 German-Netherlands Corps, in a process that began a year earlier as part of the Eastern Flank Deterrence Initiative.

On 23 June 2026, The Atlantic reported that Donahue would be stepping down soon due to pressure from Defense Secretary Pete Hegseth, despite only being in his post for eighteen months. On 24 June, an Army spokesman confirmed Donahue would relinquish command of U.S. Army Europe and Africa on 2 July, without providing a reason. Donahue had started the retirement process. His roles at U.S. Army Europe and Africa and NATO's Allied Land Command were to be done in an acting capacity by Maj. Gen. Christopher Norrie and British Army Lt. Gen. Jez Bennett, respectively. The change of command ceremony for Army Europe and Africa took place on 2 July, and for Allied Land Command, on 9 July. Donahue retired from the Army on 27 August 2026.

== Awards and decorations ==
U.S. military decorations
Defense Superior Service Medal with one bronze oak leaf cluster
Legion of Merit with two oak leaf clusters
Bronze Star Medal with "V" Device and four oak leaf clusters
Defense Meritorious Service Medal
Meritorious Service Medal with oak leaf cluster
Joint Service Commendation Medal with oak leaf cluster
Army Commendation Medal with two oak leaf clusters
Army Achievement Medal
U.S. Unit Awards
Presidential Unit Citation
Joint Meritorious Unit Award
Meritorious Unit Commendation with four oak leaf clusters
U.S. Service (Campaign) Medals and Service and Training Ribbons
National Defense Service Medal with one bronze service star
Afghanistan Campaign Medal with service star
Iraq Campaign Medal with one silver and one bronze service star
Inherent Resolve Campaign Medal with service star
Global War on Terrorism Expeditionary Medal
Global War on Terrorism Service Medal
Korea Defense Service Medal
Army Service Ribbon
Army Overseas Service Ribbon with bronze award numeral 4
NATO Medal for service with ISAF

Badges
Combat Infantryman Badge
Expert Infantryman Badge
Ranger Tab
Master Parachutist Badge
Military Free Fall Parachutist Badge
Air Assault Badge
Egyptian Parachutist Badge
82nd Airborne Division Distinctive Unit Insignia
Joint Chiefs of Staff Identification Badge
United States Army Special Operations Command Combat Service Identification Badge
14 Overseas Service Bars

== Dates of promotion ==
Rank	Branch	Date
Second lieutenant	Army	1992
Brigadier general	Army	2 September 2017
Major general	Army	2 July 2020
Lieutenant general	Army	11 March 2022
General	Army	10 December 2024

== Personal life ==
He is married to Devon Donahue, and they have five children.

== See also ==
- Boris Gromov, the last Soviet soldier to leave Afghanistan

Military offices
Preceded by James Jarrard	Commander of Delta Force; 2013–2015	Succeeded by Joshua Rudd
Preceded by Albert Elton	Commander of the Special Operations Joint Task Force–Afghanistan and NATO Special Operations Component Command–Afghanistan; 2019–2020	Succeeded by Marcus S. Evans
Preceded by James Mingus	Commanding General of the 82nd Airborne Division; 2020–2022	Succeeded by Christopher LaNeve
Preceded by Michael Kurilla	Commanding General of XVIII Airborne Corps; 2022–2024	Succeeded by Gregory K. Anderson
Preceded by Darryl A. Williams	Commanding General of United States Army Europe and Africa; 2024–2026	Succeeded by Christopher Norrie; Acting
Preceded by Darryl A. Williams	Commander of Allied Land Command; 2024–2026	Succeeded by Jez Bennett; Acting
