= Allied Force Command Madrid =

Former subordinate command of NATO's Allied Joint Force Command Naples

- Coat of arms
- Active: 1999–2013
- Allegiance: North Atlantic Treaty Organization (NATO)
- Part of: Allied Command Operations, Casteau, Belgium
- HQ: Madrid, Spain

Allied Force Command Madrid was a unit with the NATO Military Command Structure responsible for providing Deployable Joint Staff Elements (DJSE) in support of NATO operations worldwide. HQ Allied Force Command Madrid was garrisoned at Pozuelo de Alarcón in Madrid.

== History ==
The command was established as Joint Command Southwest on 30 September 1999. It was subsequently renamed Land Component Command HQ Madrid (CC-LAND HQ MD) and had a staff of 450 soldiers from 16 countries who took part in land operations in the Balkans, Afghanistan and Kosovo. In 2005 it assisted the African Union by training its troops. The last commander, General Cardona Torres, was a Spanish Army officer who took over the command in 2010. In 2010 it adopted the name Allied Force Command Madrid.

It was deactivated on 1 July 2013 and replaced by a new Allied Land Command at İzmir, Turkey.
