= Allied Land Command =

Standing headquarters for NATO land forces

Coordinates: 38.3903°N 27.1422°E

- Coat of arms
- Founded: 1 December 2012
- Type: Operational level command
- Role: Command and control of land forces
- Part of: Allied Command Operations
- Headquarters: General Vecihi Akın Garrison, Şirinyer, İzmir, Turkey
- Website: lc.nato.int

Commanders
- Commander: LTG Jez Bennett (acting); British Army
- Deputy Commander: LTG Jez Bennett; British Army
- Chief of Staff: LTG Muammer Alper; Turkish Land Forces

The Allied Land Command (abbr. LANDCOM), formerly Allied Land Forces South-Eastern Europe (LANDSOUTHEAST), is the standing headquarters for NATO land forces which may be assigned as necessary. The Commander of LANDCOM is the primary land warfare advisor to Supreme Allied Commander Europe (SACEUR) and the Alliance. When directed by SACEUR, it provides the core of the headquarters responsible for the conduct of land operations. The command is based at Şirinyer (Buca), İzmir in Turkey.

== History ==
NATO has had a headquarters at İzmir for decades. Initially, the body there was Allied Land Forces South-Eastern Europe (LANDSOUTHEAST), responsible to Allied Forces Southern Europe at Naples. Under this command, with its headquarters in İzmir assisted by the subordinate Thessaloniki Advanced Command Post, were to be most of the Greek and Turkish armies in case of war. LANDSOUTHEAST was commanded by a United States Army lieutenant general:

- Lieutenant General Willard G. Wyman (1952–54)
- Lieutenant General Paul W. Kendall (1954–55)
- Lieutenant General George Windle Read Jr. (1955–57)
- Lieutenant General Paul D. Harkins (1957–60)
- Lieutenant General Harry P. Storke (1960–61)
- Lieutenant General Frederic J. Brown II (1961–63)

In 1966 the first major change occurred when French military personnel were withdrawn from LANDSOUTHEAST, followed by the Greek withdrawal in 1974. On 30 December 1977, SHAPE and Turkish military authorities announced another change in the command structure of LANDSOUTHEAST, to be effective 1 July 1978. The command billet was to be filled by a Turkish Army four star general with a U.S. Major General as his deputy. On 30 June 1978, General Sam S. Walker handed over the command to General Vecihi Akın, the first Turkish commander. General Akın held command until 30 August 1979.

Construction of a new headquarters facility in Şirinyer, İzmir was completed in March 1994 and LANDSOUTHEAST moved into the facility in April 1994. In July 1994, two German Army officers were assigned to the command for the first time. The headquarters garrison at Şirinyer was named General Vecihi Akın Garrison in March 1996, after the first Turkish LANDSOUTHEAST Commander. Turkish Land Forces General Hüseyin Kıvrıkoğlu commanded LANDSOUTHEAST from c.1993–1996, followed by Hilmi Özkök from 1996 to 1998.

After the end of the Cold War, for a period the NATO command in İzmir became Joint Command Southeast, a joint command responsible for the defence of Turkey. After a major NATO reorganisation, the previous southern air component command, Allied Air Forces Southern Europe (AIRSOUTH), in Italy, was disestablished. In a ceremony held at General Vecihi Akin Garrison, Sirinyer, Izmir, on Wednesday, 11 August 2004, Headquarters Joint Command Southeast (JCSE) was deactivated and Component Command - Air Izmir (CC - Air Izmir) was activated. Thus from August 2004 and 1 June 2013 the new headquarters of NATO's southern air component command, CC-Air-Izmir which became Allied Air Command İzmir, was located at İzmir. The next reorganisation merged the northern and southern air component commands into the single Allied Air Command located at Ramstein Air Base in Germany under a United States Air Force general.

In 2013 the 350-person headquarters took over the responsibilities of Allied Force Command Heidelberg in Germany and Allied Force Command Madrid in Spain, which are being deactivated as part of NATO's transformation.

== Role ==
LANDCOM was created through the North Atlantic Council to ensure the interoperability of NATO land forces, and placed directly under the Supreme Allied Commander Europe to be the leading voice on land issues within the Alliance. It is responsible for providing a deployable land command for a joint operation. LANDCOM will also carry out the planning, conduct and direction of such land operations. What this means is that if a single corps land operation is underway, that corps will probably report to either JFC Brunssum or JFC Naples. If multiple corps are being directed, LANDCOM will direct them for either JFC Brunssum or Naples.

On 26 March 2015, Lieutenant General Ed Davis, Deputy Commander, Allied Land Command, arrived at Headquarters Multinational Corps Northeast (HQ MNC NE) to discuss the ongoing transformation of Multinational Corps Northeast. "The main reason I am here is that Commander LANDCOM has given me the responsibility to lead the evolution of MNC NE and Multinational Division South-East as the two new NATO command organisations which are going to be at the centre of the evolution of the NATO Land Forces," said Lieutenant General Davis.

Romania is leading the process of creating Multinational Division South-East, which will be established in Bucharest, Romania, in 2015–16. The division in Bucharest will be subordinate to the NATO Force Integration Unit also to be established there. The division will reach partial/initial operational capacity in 2016 and Full operational capability (FOC) in 2018.

== List of commanders ==
Since August 2022, the Commanding General, United States Army Europe and Africa has been dual-hatted as Commander, Allied Land Command.

No.	Portrait	Supreme Allied Commander	Took office	Left office	Time in office	Defence branch
1	Frederick B. Hodges III	Lieutenant General; Frederick B. Hodges III (born 1958)	1 December 2012	23 October 2014	1 year, 326 days	United States Army
2	John W. Nicholson Jr.	Lieutenant General; John W. Nicholson Jr. (born 1957)	23 October 2014	24 June 2016	1 year, 245 days	United States Army
3	Darryl A. Williams	Lieutenant General; Darryl A. Williams (born 1961)	24 June 2016	29 June 2018	2 years, 5 days	United States Army
–	Paolo Ruggiero	Lieutenant General; Paolo Ruggiero (born 1957); Acting (Note: as Deputy Commander, Allied Land Command)	29 June 2018	3 August 2018	35 days	Italian Army
4	John C. Thomson III	Lieutenant General; John C. Thomson III	3 August 2018	4 August 2020	2 years, 1 day	United States Army
5	Roger L. Cloutier Jr.	Lieutenant General; Roger L. Cloutier Jr. (born 1965)	4 August 2020	4 August 2022	2 years, 0 days	United States Army
(3)	Darryl A. Williams	General; Darryl A. Williams (born 1961)	4 August 2022	10 December 2024	2 years, 128 days	United States Army
6	Christopher T. Donahue	General; Christopher T. Donahue (born 1969)	10 December 2024	9 July 2026	1 year, 211 days	United States Army
–	Jez Bennett	Lieutenant General; Jez Bennett (born 1968); Acting	9 July 2026	Incumbent	90 days	British Army
