= Paolo Ruggiero =

Italian general

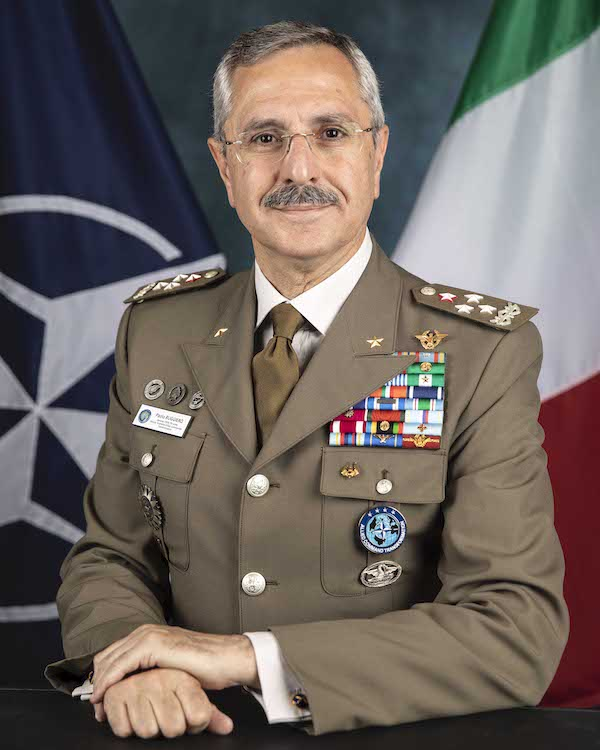
- General Ruggiero, as Deputy Allied Commander Transformation
- Born: 26 September 1957 (age 69); Naples, Italy
- Military career
- Allegiance: Italy
- Branch: Italian Army
- Service years: 1979–2022
- Rank: Lieutenant General special duties
- Units: 108th Field Artillery Battalion "Cosseria"; 132nd Heavy Field Artillery Group "Rovereto"; 1st Field Artillery Battalion “Cacciatori delle Alpi”; 52nd Artillery Regiment "Torino"; Armored Brigade "Ariete"; Army Artillery Command; Army Command for Education, Training and School of Application Studies
- Commands: UNIFIL Task Force "Lebanon" – Sector West; Chief of Staff and Deputy Commander of Resolute Support Mission; Deputy Commander of the NATO Allied Land Command LANDCOM; Deputy Supreme Allied Commander Transformation

Paolo Ruggiero (born 26 September 1957) is a General in the Italian Army who served as Deputy Supreme Allied Commander Transformation of NATO from 19 July 2019 to 7 July 2022, when he was replaced by General Chris Badia of the German Air Force.

== Military career ==
Ruggiero joined the military in the 1970's. He reached the rank of Brigadier General by 2005. He commanded the "Ariete" Armoured Brigade in Pordenone from 2006 to 2008. During this time, he was deployed with his Brigade to Southern Lebanon for Operation UNIFIL II, where as Commander of Sector West he led a multinational unit composed of troops from Italy, France, Ghana, Slovenia, South Korea and Qatar.

In 2009 he was promoted to Major General and appointed as Artillery Commander and Inspector General in Bracciano, from 2010 to 2012

Upon promotion to Lieutenant General in 2014, he was appointed Commander of the Army Command for Education, Training and School of Application Studies in Turin.

In 2015 he was deployed to Afghanistan with the "Resolute Support" Mission where he served first as Chief of Staff and then as Deputy Commander

From January 2016 to February 2019, Ruggiero was appointed Deputy Commander of the NATO Allied Land Command (LANDCOM) in İzmir, Turkey. On 19 July 2019, he was appointed Deputy Supreme Allied Commander Transformation (DSACT) in Norfolk, Virginia, U.S.

During his career, Ruggiero has held several positions in both the Italian Army General Staff (GS) and the Department of Defence. From 1997 to 2000, he was the Assistant Military Attaché at the Italian Embassy in Washington, D.C.

== Awards and decorations ==
Golden Cross of Merit of the Army - ribbon for ordinary uniform

Golden Cross of Merit of the Army
"Kabul (Afghanistan), February – September 2015."
— 13 October 2016

Silver Cross of Merit of the Army - ribbon for ordinary uniform

Silver Cross of Merit of the Army
"Tibnin (Lebanon), October 2007 - May 2008."
— 28 July 2010

=== Foreign decorations ===
Commander of the Legion of Merit (USA) - ribbon for ordinary uniform

Commander of the Legion of Merit (USA)

=== Other decorations ===
UNIFIL Medal "In the Service of Peace" (U.N. Interim Force in Lebanon) - ribbon for ordinary uniform

UNIFIL Medal "In the Service of Peace" (U.N. Interim Force in Lebanon)
