= 1st Infantry Division Artillery (United States) =

Divisional artillery command of the 1st Infantry Division, US Army

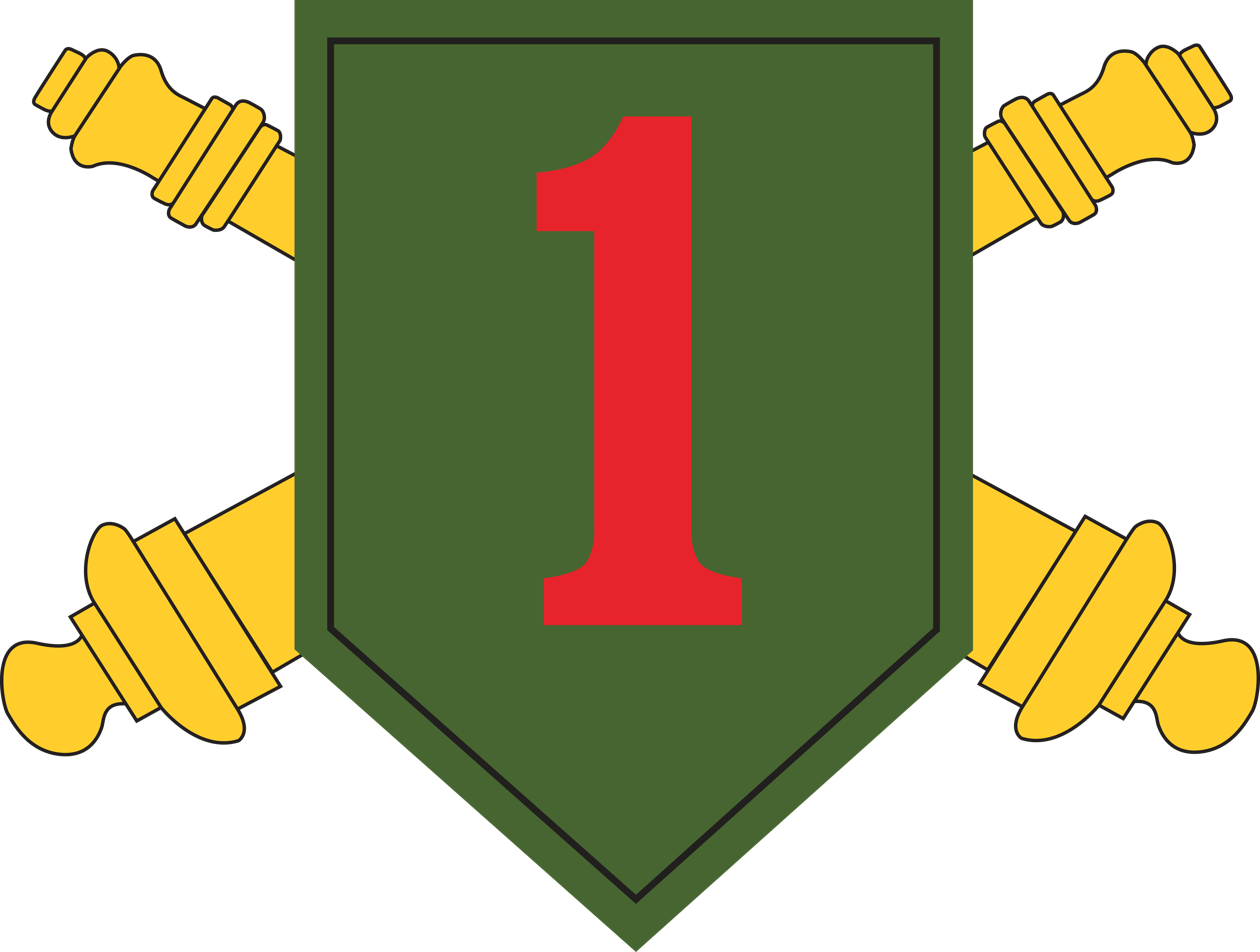
- Distinctive unit insignia
- Active: 1917–1939; 1940–1995; 1996–2005; 2015–present
- Country: United States of America
- Branch: United States Army
- Type: Field artillery
- Role: Division force fires HQ
- Size: Brigade
- Part of: 1st Infantry Division
- Garrison/HQ: Fort Riley, Kansas
- Nickname: "Drumfire"
- Equipment: M109A7 howitzer
- Engagements: World War I World War II; Vietnam War; Operation Desert Storm; Operation Iraqi Freedom

Commanders
- Current commander: COL Patrick Kaine
- Command Sergeant Major: CSM Albert V. Turner
- Notable commanders: MG John Shirley Wood, 1940–41; MG Richard Longo, 2003–05

The 1st Infantry Division Artillery (DIVARTY) is the divisional artillery command and force fires headquarters for the 1st Infantry Division at Fort Riley, Kansas. The DIVARTY has served with the division from 1917 to 1939, 1940–1995, 1996–2005, and reactivated in October 2015. The unit has been stationed at Fort Riley, Kansas, and in Germany, and has seen combat in World War I, World War II, the Vietnam War, Operation Desert Storm, and Operation Iraqi Freedom. The DIVARTY provides a single proponent with the division for standardized fires certification and leader development while exemplifying effective mission command, and supporting the seamless cross-attachment of units with common procedures and a shared understanding of the fires warfighting capabilities.

== History ==
=== World War I ===
- 1st Field Artillery Brigade
  - 5th Field Artillery Regiment (155 mm)
  - 6th Field Artillery Regiment (75 mm)
  - 7th Field Artillery Regiment (75 mm)
  - 1st Trench Mortar Battery

=== Interwar ===
On 7 October 1920, the 1st Field Artillery Brigade organized under the peacetime TO&E, which included two light (75 mm) regiments, and ammunition train of battalion size and a medical detachment. In 1929, the medium (155 mm) regiment returned to the brigade. Due to budgetary constraints, none of the units were manned or equipped to wartime strength. The 1st Division adopted a new peacetime TO&E in preparation for war on 8 January 1940, which included one light field artillery regiment of three battalions and one medium field artillery regiment of two battalions. The 1st Infantry Division reorganized again on 1 November 1940 to a new TO&E, which reorganized the Artillery Brigade into a division artillery command led by a brigadier general with one medium and three light field artillery battalions.

=== World War II ===
- Headquarters and Headquarters Battery, 1st Infantry Division Artillery
  - 5th Field Artillery Battalion (155 mm)
  - 7th Field Artillery Battalion (105 mm)
  - 32nd Field Artillery Battalion (105 mm)
  - 33rd Field Artillery Battalion (105 mm)

=== Vietnam War ===
- Headquarters and Headquarters Battery, 1st Infantry Division Artillery
  - 1st Battalion, 5th Field Artillery (105 mm)
  - 8th Battalion, 6th Artillery Regiment (155 mm)
  - 1st Battalion, 7th Field Artillery Battalion (105 mm)
  - 6th Battalion, 15th Artillery Regiment (105 mm)
  - 2nd Battalion, 33rd Artillery Regiment (105 mm)
  - Battery D, 25th Field Artillery Regiment (Target Acquisition)

=== Cold War and Gulf War ===
- Headquarters and Headquarters Battery, 1st Infantry Division Artillery
  - 1st Battalion, 5th Field Artillery (155 mm)
  - 2nd Battalion, 5th Field Artillery (155 mm)
  - 4th Battalion, 5th Field Artillery (155 mm)
  - Battery B, 6th Field Artillery Regiment (MLRS)
  - Battery D, 25th Field Artillery Regiment (Target Acquisition)

=== Global war on terror ===
- Headquarters and Headquarters Battery, 1st Infantry Division Artillery
  - 1st Battalion, 5th Field Artillery Regiment (155 mm)
  - 1st Battalion, 7th Field Artillery Regiment (155 mm)

== Lineage and honors ==
=== Lineage ===
- Constituted 24 May 1917 in the Regular Army as Headquarters, 1st Field Artillery Brigade, and assigned to the 1st Expeditionary Division
- Partially organized in June 1917 at Washington, D.C.; organization completed in August 1917 in France
- Disbanded 16 October 1939 at Fort Hoyle, Maryland
- Reconstituted 10 September 1940 in the Regular Army as Headquarters and Headquarters Battery, 1st Division Artillery
- Activated 1 October 1940 at Madison Barracks, New York
- Reorganized and redesignated 15 February 1957 as Headquarters and Headquarters Battery, 1st Infantry Division Artillery
- Inactivated 15 November 1995 at Fort Riley, Kansas
- Activated 16 February 1996 in Germany
- Inactivated 15 February 2006 in Germany
- Activated 17 October 2015 at Fort Riley, Kansas

=== Campaign credit ===
Conflict	Streamer	Year(s)
World War I	Montdidier-Noyon	1918
World War I	Aisne-Marne	1918
World War I	Saint-Mihiel	1918
World War I	Meuse-Argonne	1918
World War I	Lorraine 1917	1917
World War I	Lorraine 1918	1918
World War I	Picardy 1918	1918
World War II	Algeria-French Morocco (with arrowhead)	1942
World War II	Tunisia	1942
World War II	Sicily (with arrowhead)	1943
World War II	Normandy (with arrowhead)	1944
World War II	Northern France	1944
World War II	Rhineland	1945
World War II	Ardennes-Alsace	1944–1945
World War II	Central Europe	1945
Vietnam War	Defense	1965
Vietnam War	Counteroffensive	1965–1966
Vietnam War	Counteroffensive, Phase II	1966–1967
Vietnam War	Counteroffensive, Phase III	1967–1968
Vietnam War	Tet Counteroffensive	1968
Vietnam War	Counteroffensive, Phase IV	1968
Vietnam War	Counteroffensive, Phase V	1968
Vietnam War	Counteroffensive, Phase VI	1968–1969
Vietnam War	Tet 69/Counteroffensive	1969
Vietnam War	Summer-Fall 1969	1969
Vietnam War	Winter-Spring 1970	1969–1970
Gulf War	Defense of Saudi Arabia	1990–1991
Gulf War	Liberation and Defense of Kuwait	1991
Gulf War	Ceasefire	1991
War on terror	Global War on Terrorism	2001–present
Operation Iraqi Freedom	Transition of Iraq	2004
Operation Iraqi Freedom	Iraqi Governance	2005

=== Decorations ===
Ribbon	Award	Year	Notes
	Meritorious Unit Commendation (Army)		IRAQ 2004-2005
	French Croix de Guerre, with Palm		KASSERINE
	French Croix de Guerre, with Palm		NORMANDY
	French Croix de Guerre, World War II, Fourragere		
	Belgian Fourragere	1940	
	Cited in the Order of the Day of the Belgian Army		For action at MONS
	Cited in the Order of the Day of the Belgian Army		For action at EUPEN-MALMEDY
	Republic of Vietnam Cross of Gallantry, with Palm	VIETNAM 1968	For service in Vietnam
	Republic of Vietnam Civil Action Unit Citation	VIETNAM 1965–1970	For service in Vietnam

== Distinctive unit insignia ==
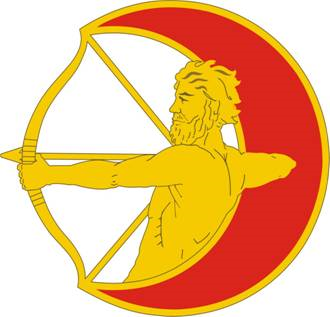

- Description/blazon: A red increscent with the human portion of a centaur issuant with drawn bow and arrow all in gold partially superimposed and between the cusps of the increscent. The insignia is 1 3/32 inches (2.78 cm) in width
- Symbolism: The 1st Field Artillery Brigade had in its organization the 6th and 7th Field Artillery Regiments and the badge consists of a charge from the shield of the coat of arms of the 7th Field Artillery and a portion of the crest of the 6th Field Artillery Regiment, to show the brigade's connection with these units
- Background: The distinctive unit insignia was originally approved for the 1st Field Artillery Brigade on 17 August 1928. It was redesignated for Headquarters and Headquarters Battery, 1st Infantry Division Artillery on 28 December 1954.
