= Quartermaster Center and School =

School and center of the United States Army

Coordinates: 37°14′39.8″N 77°20′47.6″W

U.S. Army Quartermaster Center and School
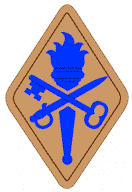
- Quartermaster School SSI
- Active: 1 March 1910 - present
- Country: United States
- Branch: United States Army
- Type: Quartermaster
- Role: School
- Part of: United States Army Combined Arms Command
- Garrison/HQ: Fort Lee, Virginia
- Mottos: Famam Extendimus Factis ("We Spread Our Fame by Our Deeds.")
- Colors: Buff and ultramarine

Commanders
- Quartermaster Commandant: COL Kevin W. Agness
- Command Sergeant Major: CSM Tonya Sims

Insignia
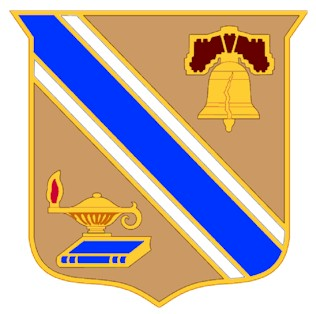
- Quartermaster School DUI

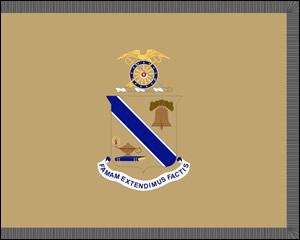
- Quartermaster School flag

The Quartermaster Center and School is a formation of the United States Army's Combined Arms Support Command, and is located at Fort Lee, Virginia. The school is operated by the 23rd Quartermaster Brigade and its assigned units.

== History ==
The school was initiated on 1 March 1910, at the Philadelphia Depot, under Brig. Gen. James B. Aleshire as a school for Quartermaster sergeants at recruit depots. The school was founded ad a response to criticisms that military uniforms were issued that were poorly fitted and sloppy in appearance. The goal of the school was that the sergeants would become the "storekeepers of the Army."

In 1912, the army combined the commissary and pay departments with the Quartermaster Corps resulting in an increase in duties for quartermaster sergeants and the school was no officially called The Quartermaster Corps School.

With the start of World War I, the school began its first ever class for officers.

The school moved to Schuylkill Arsenal in Pennsylvania in 1921 (but some classes continued in Philadelphia until 1925) and a warrant officers class was instituted that same year.

In 1934, the army approved Colonel Francis H. Pope's idea for a Quartermaster Corps Board to look for improvements and make recommendations for the quartermaster corps.

In 1940, with war likely, the War Department ordered the quartermaster school to create a 3-month officers course to replace the current 9-month course in order to speed the training of new officers. What followed were shortened enlisted courses, ROTC cadet classes and officer candidate school (OCS).

During World War II, despite expanding into vacant buildings in the nearby community, the facilities at Schuylkill Arsenal grew overcrowded. On 6 October 1941, the school officially moved to Camp Lee (now Fort Lee) in Virginia. The school was set up on over 500 acres of land from the Department of the Interior that was previously Petersburg National Military Park.

In March of 1942, an additional training site for the school was set up for OCS training at Fort Francis E. Warren in Wyoming.

After Operation Torch, it became obvious to the Quartermaster Corps that newly trained junior officers of the corps would need to be more than just stock keepers and technicians. A new combat portion of training would be needed focusing on tactics, gas defenses and defending against enemy attacks. But pressure to increase the size of the army in 1943 and 1944 meant that officer from OCS and ROTC were not always fully qualified before being sent to their units.

During World War II, Fort Lee was segregated as were all army units at the time. But the war required hundreds of thousands of black men and women to serve and nearly 80 percent served in the services like quartermaster. Black troops trained at Ft. Lee faced discrimination, but would go on to serve in the Red Ball Express, on Ledo Road and burying thousands of American dead.

In 1957, the school opened the Quartermaster Museum with displays of uniforms.

In 1999, the Marine Corps moved their culinary training to Fort Lee and in 2010 both the Navy and Air Force followed.

In 2010, the Air Force's 345th Training Squadron moved from Joint Base San Antonio to Fort Lee. The 345th TRS trains logistics readiness officers and transportation management airmen.

== Insignia ==
The shoulder sleeve insignia (SSI) is a buff (i.e., tan) rounded lozenge, 2 inches by 3 inches with a blue torch with blue flames and a crossed blue key and sword.

The shoulder sleeve insignia was originally approved for the Quartermaster Training Command on 7 November 1956. On 24 November 1975 the insignia was amended to reverse the colors of the insignia.

The distinctive unit insignia (DUI) is a buff shield with a pointed flat top. It is divided by a thick diagonal blue line with white accents. The upper division contains the Liberty Bell and the lower division has the lamp of knowledge upon a closed book. The Liberty Bell is symbolic of the city of Philadelphia, where the Quartermaster Corps School was first established. The lamp of knowledge upon the closed book represents the educational character of the school. At the base of the shield, placed is the motto of the school, "Famam extendimus factis" – "We spread our fame by our deeds."

The distinctive unit insignia was originally approved for the Quartermaster Corps School on 16 December 1929.

== Flag ==
The flag of the U.S. Army Quartermaster Center and School is buff with an ultramarine fringe. The distinctive insignia of the school is centered on the flag.

== Quartermaster commandants / quartermaster generals ==
Rank and name	From	To
COL Kevin W. Agness	June 2025	Incumbent
COL Erin C. Miller	July 2024	June 2025
COL Jin H. Pak	June 2023	May 2024
BG Mike Siegl	June 2022	June 2023
BG Michelle K. Donahue	June 2020	June 2022
BG Douglas M. McBride Jr.	June 2018	June 2020
BG Rodney D. Fogg	June 2016	June 2018
BG Ronald Kirklin	June 2014	June 2016
BG John E. O'Neil IV	August 2012	June 2014
BG Gwen Bingham	November 2010	August 2012
BG Jesse R. Cross	October 2007	November 2010
BG Mark A. Bellini	August 2005	October 2007
BG Scott G. West	May 2003	August 2005
MG Terry E. Juskowiak	July 2001	May 2003
MG Hawthorne L. Proctor	July 1999	July 2001
MG James M. Wright	June 1997	July 1999
MG Henry T. Glisson	June 1996	June 1997
MG Robert K. Guest	August 1993	June 1996
LTG John J. Cusick	July 1991	August 1993
MG Paul J. Vanderploog	July 1989	June 1991
MG William T. McLean	June 1987	July 1989
MG Eugene L. Stillions Jr.	March 1984	June 1987
MG Harry L. Dukes Jr.	July 1981	March 1984
MG Webster Anderson	June 1961	July 1962
MG Andrew T. McNamara	June 1957	June 1961
MG Kester L. Hastings	February 1954	March 1957
MG George A. Horkan	October 1951	January 1954
MG Herman Feldman	March 1949	September 1951
MG Thomas B. Larkin	February 1946	March 1949
LTG Edmund B. Gregory	April 1940	January 1946
MG Henry Gibbins	April 1936	March 1940
MG Louis H. Bash	February 1934	March 1936
MG John L. DeWitt	February 1930	February 1934
MG B. Frank Cheatham	January 1926	January 1930
MG William H. Hart	August 1922	January 1926
MG Harry L. Rogers	July 1918	August 1922
MG Henry G. Sharpe	September 1916	July 1918
MG James B. Aleshire	July 1907	September 1916
BG Charles F. Humphrey	April 1903	July 1907
BG Marshall I. Ludington	February 1898	April 1903
BG George H. Weeks	February 1897	February 1898
BG Charles G. Sawtelle	August 1896	February 1897
BG Richard N. Batchelder	June 1890	July 1896
BG Samuel B. Holabird	July 1883	June 1890
BG Rufus Ingalls	February 1882	July 1883
BG Daniel H. Rucker	February 1882	February 1882
BG Montgomery C. Meigs	May 1861	February 1882
BG Joseph E. Johnston	June 1860	April 1861
BG Thomas S. Jesup	May 1818	June 1860
COL George Gibson	April 1816	April 1818
COL James Mullany	April 1816	April 1818
BG Robert Swartwout	March 1813	June 1816
BG Morgan Lewis	April 1812	March 1813
MG John Wilkins Jr.	June 1796	June 1802
James O'Hara	April 1792	May 1796
Samuel Hodgdon	March 1791	April 1792
COL Timothy Pickering	August 1780	July 1785
MG Nathanael Greene	March 1778	August 1780
MG Thomas Mifflin	October 1776	November 1777
COL Stephen Moylan	June 1776	September 1776
MG Thomas Mifflin	August 1775	May 1776

== 23rd Quartermaster Brigade ==
=== History ===
The 23rd Quartermaster Brigade "The Dragon Brigade" was formed as the 23rd Quartermaster Regiment (Truck) in the Third Corps Area in 1936. I was reorganized as a brigade on 12 February 1987. The brigade currently trains 23,000 students from the army, navy, air force and Marine Corps. This includes the Quartermaster Center and School as well as the NCO Academy.

The brigade runs Advanced Individual Training (AIT), Military Occupational Specialty - Transition (MOS-T) and the Log Warrior and Sustainment Warrior Field Training (SWFTX) exercises.

23rd Quartermaster Brigade
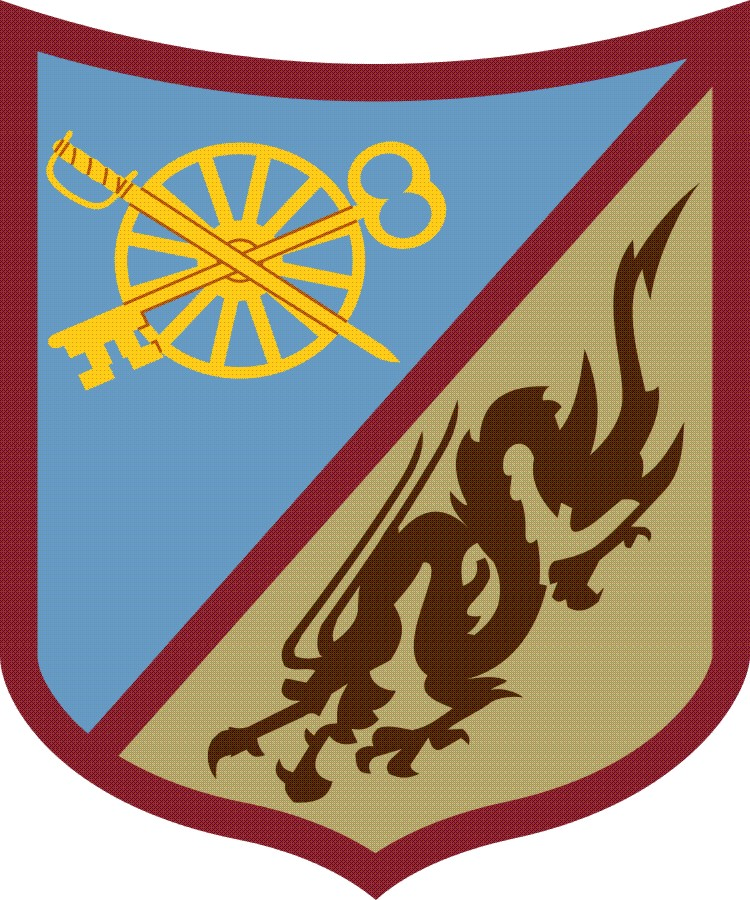
- Shoulder sleeve insignia
- Active: 12 February 1987 - present
- Country: United States
- Branch: United States Army
- Type: Quartermaster
- Size: Brigade
- Part of: Quartermaster Center and School
- Garrison/HQ: Fort Lee, Virginia
- Motto: "The Corps Starts Here"

Commanders
- Current commander: COL David L. Thompson

Insignia
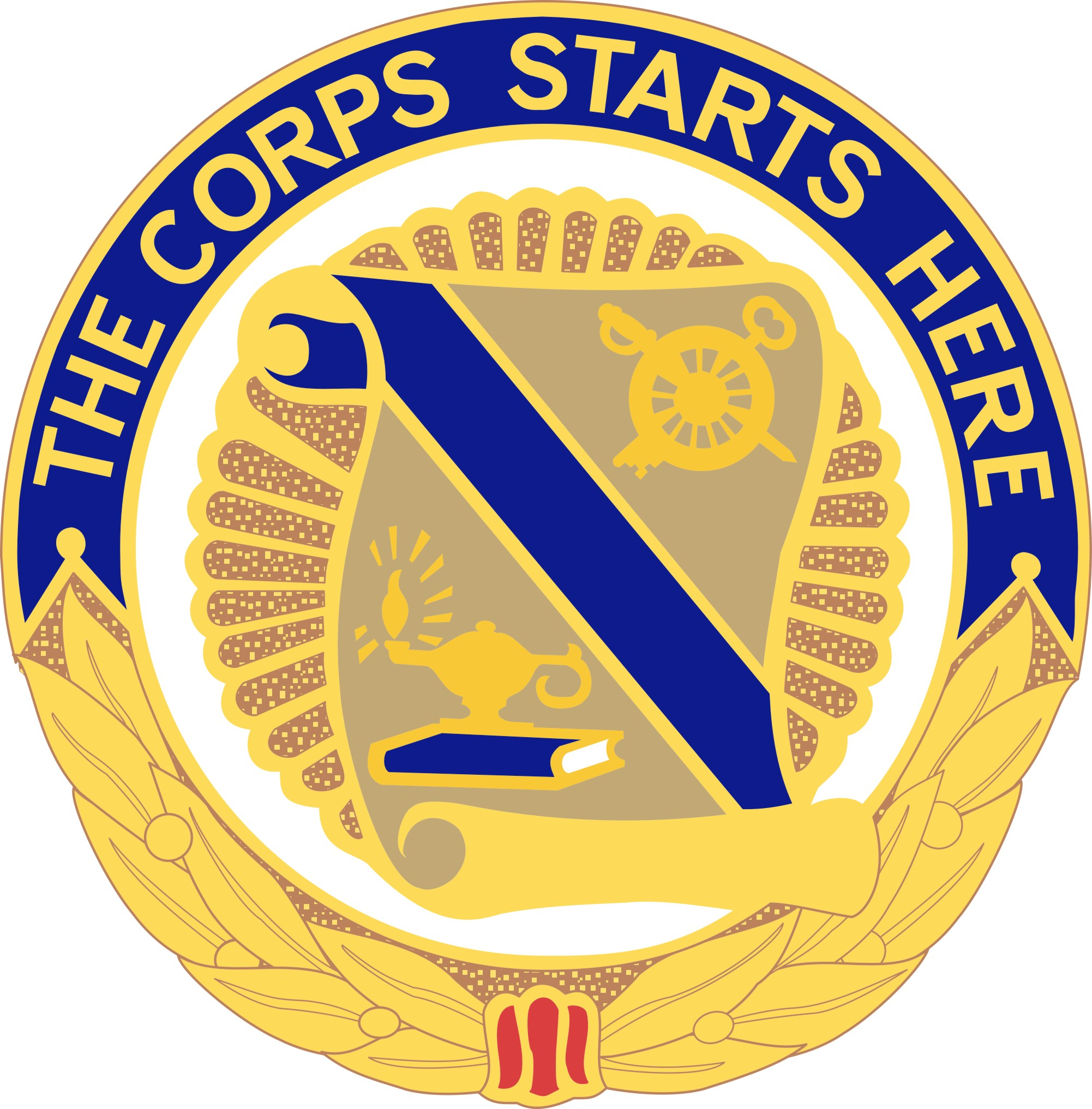
- Distinctive unit insignia

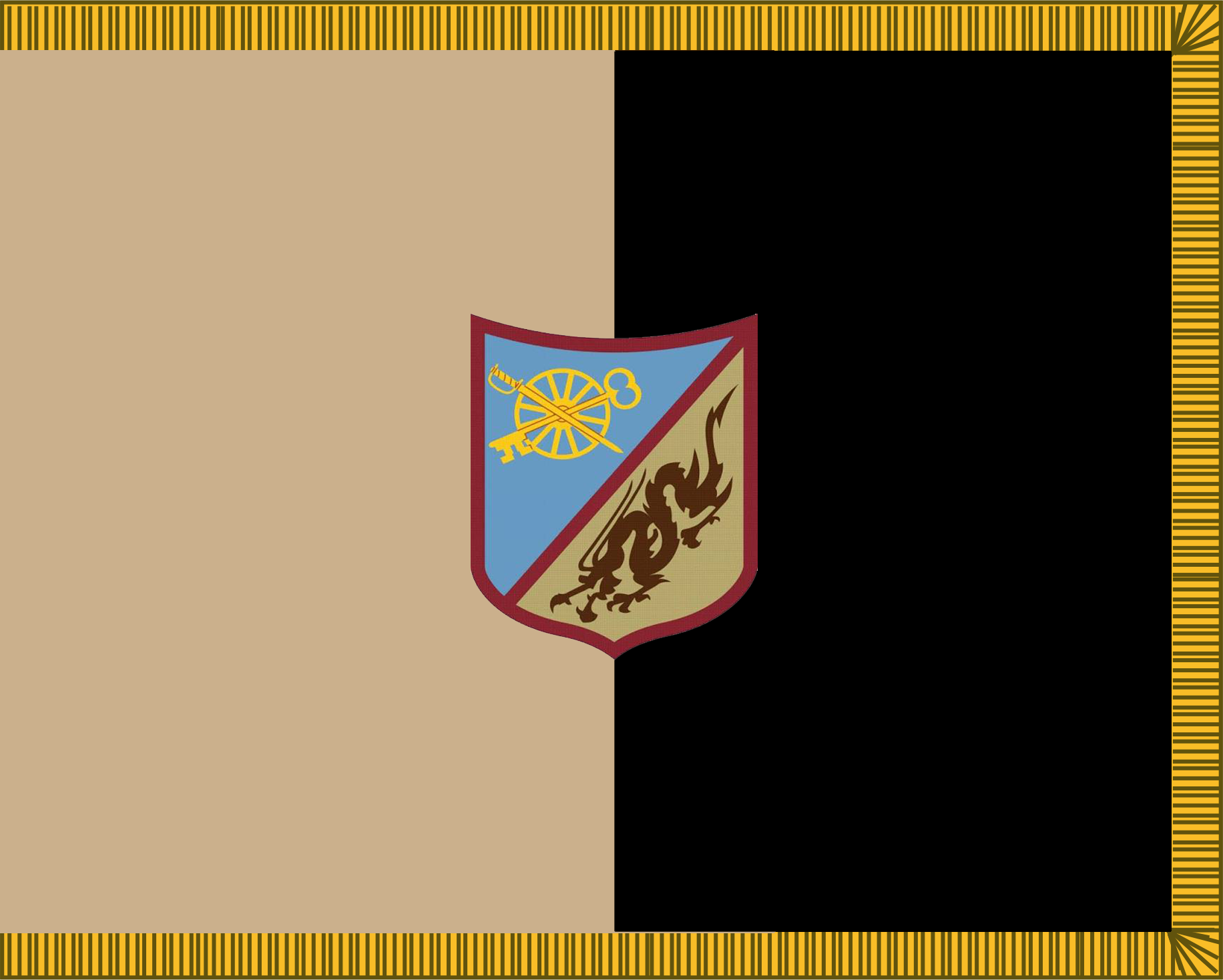
- 23rd Quartermaster Brigade Flag

=== Organization ===
Emblem	Unit name	Structure
	23rd Quartermaster Brigade	Headquarters and headquarters company (HHC), 23rd Quartermaster Brigade; 244th Quartermaster Battalion; Companies A, W, P, G; 262nd Quartermaster Battalion; Companies C (Airborne), J, R, U, V; 266th Quartermaster Battalion; Companies B, T; United States Marine Corps Detachment; United States Air Force Detachment; United States Navy Detachment
