= Quartermaster Hall of Fame =

Coordinates: 37°14′32.7″N 77°20′48.8″W

The Quartermaster Hall of Fame Program is to recognize individuals who have made significant contributions to the Quartermaster Corps. It was established in November 1985 as part of the Quartermaster Regimental honors program. The Hall of Fame in Mifflin Hall at Fort Gregg-Adams, VA was opened on 12 June 1986. New inductees are selected every year, with the ceremony held annually.

== Inductees ==
- Richard Napoleon Batchelder
- John Cusick
- Ann E. Dunwoody
- Carl H. Freeman
- Nathanael Greene
- Edmund B. Gregory
- Terence Hildner
- Rufus Ingalls
- Thomas Jesup
- Montgomery C. Meigs
- Thomas Mifflin
- Timothy Pickering
- Henry Granville Sharpe
- Ralph Siu
- Henry Gene Skeen
- Billy K. Solomon
- Richard Horner Thompson
- Paul J. Vanderploog
- Warren Whitside
- Joseph W. Brundy, III
