= Edmund Gregory =

Edmund Gregory may refer to:

- Edmund Gregory (author) (fl. 1646), English author
- Edmund B. Gregory (1882–1961), U.S. Army general
