= Andrew T. McNamara =

U.S. Army officer

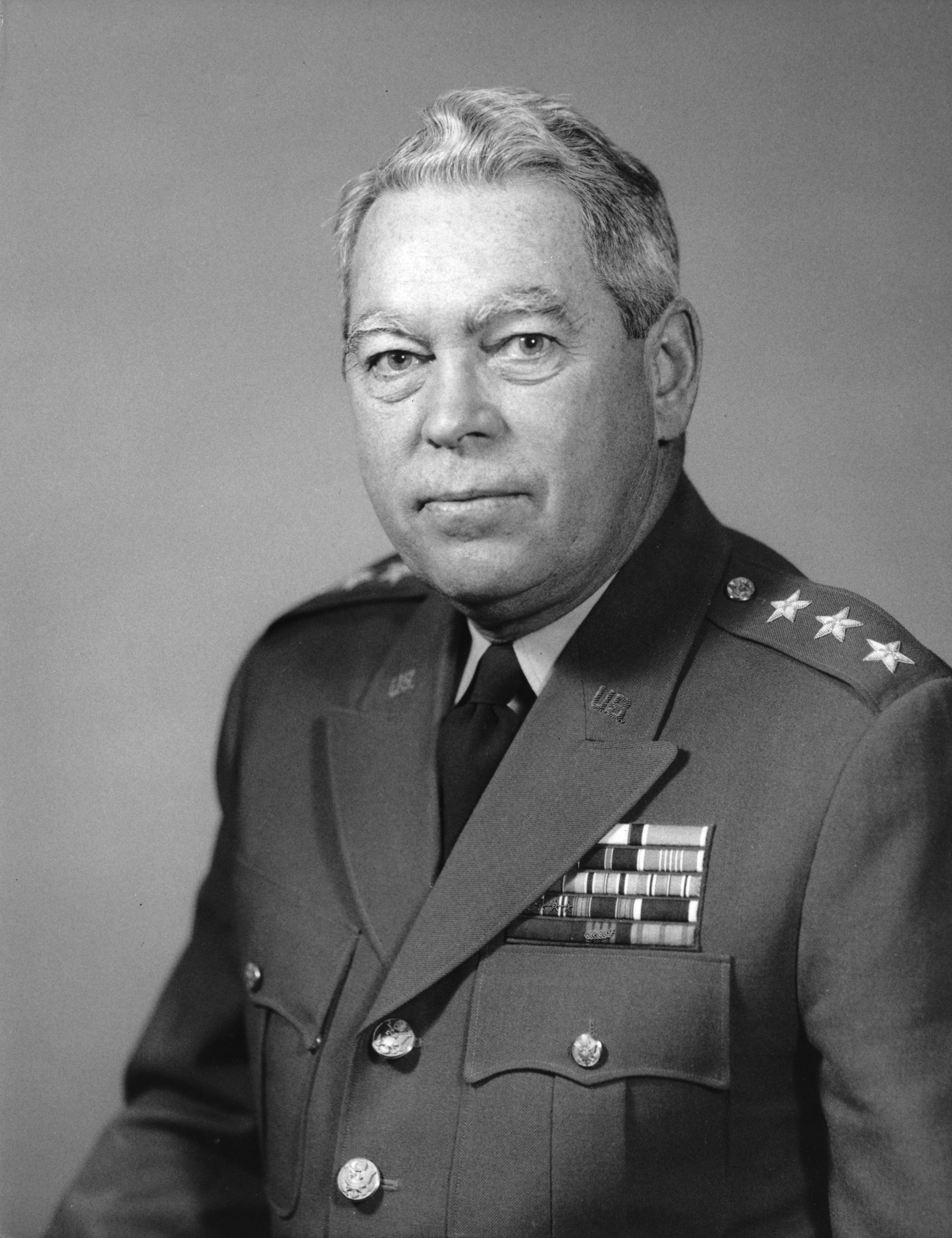
- Born: 14 May 1905; East Providence, Rhode Island, U.S.
- Died: 6 April 2002 (aged 96); Fort Belvoir, Virginia, U. S.
- Burial place: Arlington National Cemetery, Arlington, Virginia, U.S.
- Military career
- Allegiance: United States
- Branch: Infantry (1928–1937); Quartermaster Corps (1937–1961)
- Service years: 1928–1964
- Rank: Lieutenant general
- Service number: O-17324
- Commands: Quartermaster School; Quartermaster General; Defense Supply Agency
- Conflicts: World War II; Algeria–French Morocco; Tunisia; Sicily; Normandy; Northern France; Rhineland; Ardennes-Alsace; Central Europe
- Awards: Legion of Merit; Army Distinguished Service Medal (3); Bronze Star Medal; Croix de Guerre 1939–1945 with Palm (France); Chevalier of the Legion of Honor (France); Ordre de la couronne de chêne (Luxembourg)

Andrew Thomas McNamara Jr. (14 May 1905 – 6 April 2002) was a lieutenant general in the United States Army who served in World War II. He was Quartermaster General from 1957 to 1961, and the first director of the Defense Supply Agency from 1961 to 1964.

A 1928 graduate of the United States Military Academy at West Point, New York, McNamara was commissioned in the infantry but transferred to the Quartermaster Corps in 1937. During World War II he was the deputy quartermaster and then quartermaster of the II Corps, and participated in the campaigns in French North Africa, Tunisia and Sicily. In September 1943, he became the quartermaster of the First Army, serving in that role for the rest of the war in the campaigns in Northwest Europe.

== Early life and career ==
McNamara as a West Point Cadet c. 1928

Andrew Thomas McNamara Jr. was born in East Providence, Rhode Island, on 14 May 1905, one of four children and the only son of a barber. At high school he distinguished himself as an athlete, He entered the United States Military Academy at West Point, New York on 1 July 1924, and graduated on 9 June 1928, ranked 253rd in his class of 261.

McNamara was commissioned as a second lieutenant in the infantry on graduation, and after the usual post-graduation furlough he was assigned to the 28th Infantry Regiment at Madison Barracks, New York, on 9 September. There he met Margaret Catherine Tripp, nicknamed "Pidge" by her brothers. They were married on 12 February 1931. They had two children: Andrew T. McNamara III, who was born in 1935, and William T. McNamara, who was born in 1937. On 17 March 1931 he joined the 25th Infantry Regiment at Schofield Barracks in the Territory of Hawaii. He returned to the United States in April 1933, and went to Alexandria, Louisiana, as a company commander with the Civilian Conservation Corps, a jobs program run by the Army during the Great Depression. He then attended the Infantry School at Fort Benning, Georgia, from 2 September 1933 to 15 June 1934.

On 15 June 1934, McNamara was detailed to the Quartermaster Corps. He attended the Quartermaster Corps Subsistence School in Chicago, Illinois, from 18 August 1934 to 31 mat 1935. While there he was promoted to first lieutenant on 1 October 1934. He was the Subsistence and Sales Commissary and Salvage Officer at Fort McPherson, Georgia from 2 June 1935 to 15 June 1936, and then the Sales Store and Quartermaster Salvage and Inventory Officer at Fort Devens, Massachusetts until 5 September 1939. He transferred to the Quartermaster Corps on 17 August 1937, and was promoted to captain on 9 June 1938. He attended the Quartermaster School in Philadelphia, Pennsylvania, from 5 September 1939 to 1 February 1940 and the School for Bakers and Cooks at Fort Benning from 30 May to 1 July 1940. In between he was assistant quartermaster of the 5th Infantry Division at Fort McClellan, Alabama.

== World War II ==
McNamara was the Assistant Quartermaster at Fort Sam Houston, Texas, from August 1940 to July 1941. He was promoted to major in the Army of the United States on 31 January 1941. He then became the assistant director of Supply and Executive Officer at the new Quartermaster Replacement Training Center at Camp Lee, Virginia, where, with the United States now involved in World War II, he was promoted to lieutenant colonel on 1 March 1942. On 15 June 1942 he joined the headquarters of the II Corps, commanded by Major General Mark W. Clark, as the executive officer of the quartermaster section. Eight days later the headquarters was ordered to move to the Indiantown Gap Military Reservation in Pennsylvania and prepare for overseas movement. On 30 June it departed the New York Port of Embarkation on the SS Monterey, bound for the United Kingdom, where it opened at Tidworth Barracks.

II Corps embarked again in October, this time to participate in Operation Torch, the Allied invasion of French North Africa. Clark left to become the Deputy Commander at Allied Force Headquarters, and he took the II Corps quartermaster, Colonel Thomas H. Ramsey, with him. Clark was succeeded by Major General Lloyd Fredendall, and Ramsey by McNamara, who embarked for North Africa on the SS Letitia on 26 October. During the Battle of Kasserine Pass, the American supply dumps were threatened. All the rations were issued from the railhead, and 190,000 litres (50,000 US gal) of gasoline had to be burned. The main supply dumps around Tebessa lay in the path of the German and Italian advance, and McNamara coordinated the movement of supplies and logistical units to the rear. As a result of the Battle of Kasserine Pass, Fredendall was replaced by Major General George S. Patton. In April 1943 Patton wrote a letter of commendation to McNamara in which he said:

The functioning of the Quartermaster Corps under your direction has been outstandingly superior. You have secured and provided supplies in proper quantities and categories at the place and time needed. I desire to highly commend you, and through you, the officers and men of the Quartermaster Corps for a most superior performance.

That month Patton was succeeded by Major General Omar N. Bradley. For his services in Northwest Africa McNamara was awarded the Legion of Merit. He continued as II Corps quartermaster for the Allied invasion of Sicily in July 1943.

In September 1943, McNamara was one of the II Corps officers that Bradley chose to take with him to form the staff of his new command, the First Army, in the UK. McNamara served as its quartermaster throughout the campaigns in Northwest Europe, the Bronze Star Medal for the Battle of Normandy. During the Battle of the Bulge, the First Army's depots at Spa and Stavelot, which held 12,300 long tons (12,500 t) of fuel, lay directly in the path of the German advance. With Kasserine Pass in mind, McNamara immediately suspended deliveries of fuel to the truckhead at Bütgenbach. He was given a report that the Germans were relying on captured fuel to sustain their offensive, so he sent 600 trucks to the fuel dumps to move their contents back to the railheads. Over the next three days all but (about 11,000,000 litres (3,000,000 US gal) was saved; another 450,000 litres (120,000 US gal) was burned form a roadblock. Only 190,000 litres (50,000 US gal) at St. Vith was abandoned and captured by the Germans. For his services in Northwest Europe, he was awarded the Legion of Merit, the Army Distinguished Service Medal, and the French Croix de Guerre 1939–1945 with Palm. France made him a Chevalier of the Legion of Honor and Luxembourg made him a member of the Ordre de la couronne de chêne.

== Post-war ==
First Army headquarters returned to the United States in June 1945, and in September McNamara became the chief quartermaster at Fort Bragg, North Carolina. In February 1946 he went to Washington, D.C., as the director of the Subsistence Division in the Office of the Quartermaster General. He attended the National War College from 1 July 1947 to 4 August 1948, and was promoted to lieutenant colonel in the Quartermaster Corps on 15 July 1948. He was then assigned to the Operations Division (OPD) of the Army General Staff. In 1950 he became the commandant of the Quartermaster School, which was now at Fort Lee, Virginia. He returned to Washington, D.C., as executive to the Under Secretary of the Army in September 1951. He rejoined the Army General Staff in March 1953, and then moved to the Office of the Deputy Chief of Staff for Logistics (DCSLOG), where he became the chief of the Storage and Distribution Division in September 1954, and the director of Supply Operations in April 1955. In July 1956 he became the Assistant Chief of Staff, G-4, at United States Army Europe.

On 18 April 1957, President Dwight D. Eisenhower nominated McNamara to become Quartermaster General, and he assumed the office on 12 June. In this role he personally presented Eisenhower with 49- and 50-star flags. McNamara was promoted to lieutenant general in September 1961 and assigned as deputy commander of the Eighth Army in Korea, but his service there was brief, as later that month he was recalled to Washington, D.C., by the Secretary of Defense, Robert McNamara (no relation), to serve as the first director of the Defense Supply Agency (DSA) on 1 October 1961. By the time McNamara retired in 1964, DSA was responsible for 1.3 million different items, which made up an inventory valued at $2.2 billion, with an annual procurement of $3 billion. He was awarded an oak leaf cluster to his Distinguished Service Medal for his service in Korea, and a second one for his service as head of the DSA.

== Later life ==
In retirement, McNamara served for as president and secretary of the Defense Supply Association (later renamed the American Logistics Association) for a decade. His hobby was writing children's books. He died at Fort Belvoir, Virginia, on 6 April 2002 and was buried in Arlington National Cemetery with his wife, who died in 1997. On 15 October 1998, the Quartermaster Museum named its new supply gallery in his honor.
