= Paul J. Vanderploog =

United States Army general

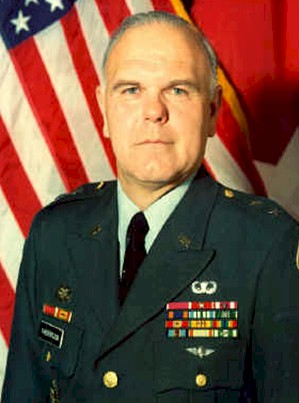
- Major General Paul J. Vanderploog; 41st Quartermaster General of the United States Army
- Born: March 22, 1941 (age 85); Rochester, New York
- Military career
- Allegiance: United States of America
- Branch: United States Army
- Service years: 1963–1996
- Rank: Major General

Major General Paul J. Vanderploog, USA (born March 22, 1941) is a retired American Quartermaster officer who served as the 41st Quartermaster General of the United States Army from 1989 to 1991. He was inducted into the U.S. Army Quartermaster Foundation's Hall of Fame in 2010.

== Early life ==
Major General Venderploog was born in Rochester, New York. In 1963, he was commissioned as a Second Lieutenant and awarded a Bachelor of Science Degree from Syracuse University.

== Military service ==
He served in numerous command and staff positions including command of the Aerial Equipment Support Company, 15th Supply and Service Battalion, 1st Cavalry Division, Republic of Vietnam and as Executive Officer, J4, Military Assistance Command, Vietnam. He next assignment was the Office of the Deputy Chief of Staff for Logistics, Department of the Army. While in this assignment he was selected to serve as a Military Assistant to the Under Secretary of the Army.

His senior command assignments include Director, J-4, United States European Command; Director of Logistics and Security Assistance, J4/7, United States Central Command; Commanding General U.S. Army Quartermaster Center and School; Commanding General, 2nd Support Command; and Commander, Division Support Command, 3rd Infantry Division (United States).

He retired from the Army on June 30, 1996.

== Post-retirement ==
Since retirement, Vanderploog has served as the Director of Water Resource Services Hillsborough County, Florida.

== Education ==
He holds a master's degree in Business Administration from Virginia Commonwealth University. His military education includes the Infantry Officer Basic Course, Quartermaster Officer Advanced Course, the Marine Corps Command and Staff College and the Industrial College of the Armed Forces.

== Decorations and honors ==
- Defense Distinguished Service Medal
- Distinguished Service Medal (U.S. Army)
- Legion of Merit
- Bronze Star Medal with Oak leaf Cluster
- Meritorious Service Medal with Oak Leaf Cluster
- Air Medal
- Joint Service Commendation Medal
- Army Commendation Medal with Oak Leaf Cluster
- Commanders Cross of the Order of Merit of the Federal Republic of Germany
- Parachutist Badge
- Parachute Rigger Badge
- Army Staff Identification Badge

Major General Vanderploog is a distinguished member of the Quartermaster Regiment and was inducted into the U.S. Army Quartermaster Hall of Fame in June 2010.

Military offices
Preceded by William T. McLean	Quartermaster General of the United States Army; 1989–1991	Succeeded by John J. Cusick
