= Quartermaster General of the United States Army =

Commanding officer of the U.S. Army's Quartermaster Corps

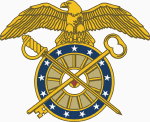
- Incumbent; Col. Kevin W. Agness since July 2, 2024
- Quartermaster Corps
- Abbreviation: QMG
- Seat: Fort Lee, Virginia
- Formation: June 16, 1775 (251 years ago)
- First holder: Maj. Gen. Thomas Mifflin
- Website: Official website

The Quartermaster General of the United States Army serves as the quartermaster general of the United States Army and head of the United States Army Quartermaster Corps.

The Quartermaster General does not command quartermaster units, but is primarily focused on the training, doctrine and professional development of quartermaster soldiers. The Quartermaster General also serves as commandant of the Quartermaster Center and School at Fort Lee, Virginia.

== History ==
The office of the Quartermaster General was established by resolution of the Continental Congress on 16 June 1775, though remained vacant until the appointment of Thomas Mifflin began on 14 August 1775. Perhaps the most notable Quartermaster General was Nathanael Greene, third to serve in the post, from March 1778 to August 1780.

=== 18th century ===
The position of quartermaster general originated in the Continental Army, under order of Congress. Two days after establishing the Army, Congress ordered the creation of both a quartermaster general and a deputy quartermaster general on 16 June 1775. The role served the command of the Continental Army, acting as the primary business liaison, dealing with civilians, operating and repairing supply lines, including roads being traveled while transporting troops, and furnishing all supplies needed to establish camps when troops arrive.

Upon establishment of the position, Congress authorized George Washington to appoint the first quartermaster general. Amongst his aides-de-camp, the experienced Philadelphia merchant Maj. Thomas Mifflin proved to be a prime choice, being reappointed to the position later in 1776.

=== 19th century ===
Fifteen officers held the office of quartermaster general in the United States Army in the nineteenth century. The first, John Wilkins Jr., was a major general. Two colonels, James Mullany and George Gibson, jointly held the office between April 29, 1816, and April 14, 1818. On May 8, 1818, Thomas Jessup became the Quartermaster General, and he remained in the position until 1860. As a combat veteran, Jessup understood the importance of support to front line soldiers and instituted many enduring practices and policies. Because of his reforms, historians often call Jessup the "father of the Quartermaster Corps". From 1860 to the end of the century, the quartermaster general office was held by officers who served in the American Civil War.

Brigadier General Joseph E. Johnston held the position from June 28, 1860, until his resignation on April 22, 1861. Johnston was appointed a full general in the Confederate States Army on August 31, 1861. Adhering to the ideology of states' rights, quartermasters of each Confederate state exercised considerable autonomy from their national quartermaster general. Within their jurisdictions, these Confederate officers exercised powers equivalent to the Union quartermaster general. Georgia quartermaster general Ira Roe Foster is, perhaps, the best example of a Confederate quartermaster exercising considerable power over both production and supply within his state. Brigadier General Montgomery C. Meigs succeeded Johnston on May 15, 1861. Meigs was born in Augusta, Georgia but his family was from Philadelphia and he adhered to the Union during the Civil War. Meigs served throughout the war and retired on February 6, 1882. Contemporaries such as Secretary of State William H. Seward and many historians have given Meigs's work in keeping the Union Army adequately and timely supplied considerable credit for the Union victory.

From February 13, 1882, to February 23, 1882 Daniel H. Rucker was quartermaster general, an appointment intended to honor his many years of military service. At the end of his brief tenure, Rucker retired. Rufus Ingalls, a brevet brigadier general and quartermaster for all Union Army forces during the Siege of Petersburg succeeded Rucker. Ingalls also had a brief tenure in office, serving between February 23, 1883, and July 1, 1883, when he also retired. Samuel B. Holabird, who was chief quartermaster of the Union Department of the Gulf during much of the Civil War, succeeded Ingalls and served from July 1, 1883, to June 16, 1890. Richard Napoleon Batchelder, quartermaster for II Corps of the Union Army and a recipient of the Medal of Honor, succeeded Holabird. He held the office between June 26, 1890, and July 27, 1896.

Another brevet brigadier general who had served as quartermaster for II Corps, Charles G. Sawtelle, succeeded Batchelder. He served between August 19, 1896, and February 16, 1897. George H. Weeks, who served as quartermaster with the III Corps of the Union Army, held the office between February 6, 1897, and his retirement on February 3, 1898.

The last quartermaster general of the 19th century was Marshall I. Ludington, who assumed the office on February 3, 1898, three months before the Spanish–American War. Ludington had served as a division quartermaster for the Army of the Potomac. He was criticized for the general unpreparedness of the U.S. Army for the Spanish–American War but he had inherited the general state of unpreparedness of the army, which had been given meager funds and kept small during the long period of relative peace that followed the Civil War. Ludington succeeded in improving the supply situation of the U.S. Army to an adequate state in a matter of months after the start of the war. He was promoted to major general on April 12, 1903, and retired the next day.

==== Duties at close of century ====
At the close of the 19th century, in an annual report for Congress, the quartermaster general defined his duties as follows.

Under existing laws the Quartermaster's Department, under the direction of the Secretary of War, provides the Army with military stores and supplies requisite for its use, such as clothing and equipage, tents, band instruments, tableware and mess furniture, equipments for post bakeries, fuel, forage, stationery, lumber, straw for bedding for men and animals, all materials for camp, and for shelter for troops and stores, furniture for barracks, such as bunks, benches, chairs, tables, lockers, heating and cooking stoves for use in public barracks and quar ters, tools for mechanics and laborers in the Quartermaster's Department, furniture. Text-books, papers, and equipment for post schools, reading matter for post libraries, wagons, ambulances, carts, saddles, harness, water supply, sewerage, plumbing, illuminating supplies, and heating for all military posts and buildings.

The Department is also charged with the duty of transporting, by land and water, troops, munitions of war, equipments, and all articles of military supplies from the place of purchase to the several armies, garrisons, posts, and recruiting places.

Under act of Congress amending section 1661, Revised Statutes, for arming and equipping the militia, this Department supplies quarter: master stores, clothing, and equipage to the militia of the several States and Territories, and transports the same to said States and Territories. It also furnishes transportation for ordnance and ordnance stores issued by the United States to the militia of the several States and Territo ries. It also transports the property for other Executive Departments on requisitions, payments therefor being made by the respective Depart ments to the carriers upon accounts forwarded through the Quarter master-general's Office for that purpose.

This Department prepares the necessary plans and constructs all buildings at military posts, such as barracks, quarters, storehouses, hospitals, etc., builds wharves, constructs and repairs roads for military purposes, builds all necessary military bridges, provides, by hire or pur chase, grounds for military encampments and buildings; contracts for all horses for cavalry, artillery, and for the Indian scouts, and for such infantry and members of the Hospital Corps in the field campaigns as may be required to be mounted; pays for all incidental expenses of the military service which are not provided by other corps.

=== 20th century ===
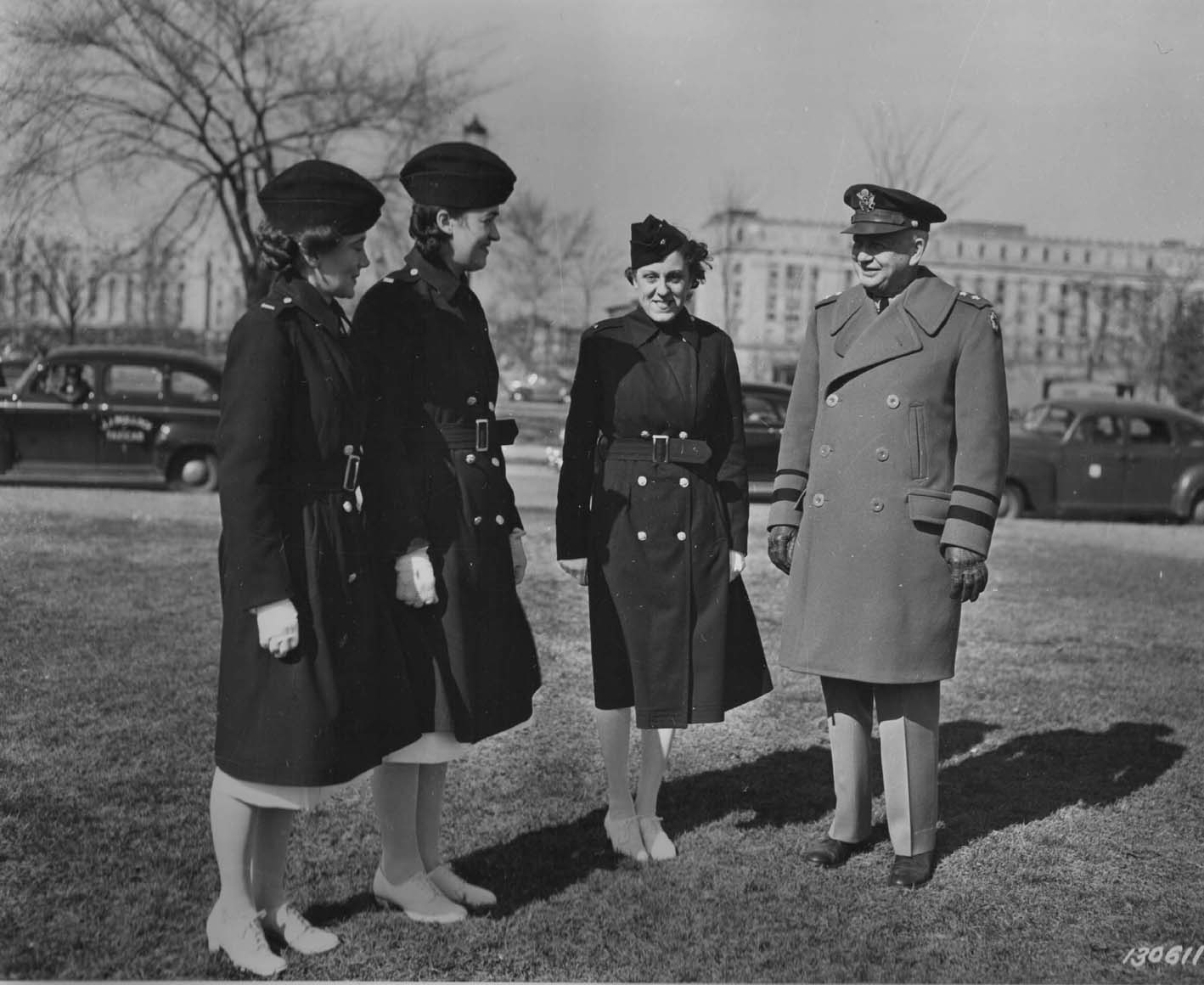
Quartermaster General Maj Gen Gregory discusses Army nurses' clothing with Lt. Alice Montgomery, Lt. Josephine Etz, and Lt. Leophile Bouchard, of Walter Reed Hospital. The quartermaster general is responsible for supplying all branches of the Army.

In 1907 James B. Aleshire was named quartermaster general; he would retire in 1916 with the rank brigadier general. Aleshire was notable for combining the formerly separate Quartermaster, Subsistence and Pay Departments to create the consolidated U.S. Army Quartermaster Corps. He named his classmate and subordinate, Henry Granville Sharpe, the father of consolidation. Sharpe and Aleshire succeeded at eliminating the unwieldy centralized control of the army supply system that had grown up after the end of the American Civil War. In addition to creating administrative departments at his headquarters to manage the day to day operations of the Quartermaster Corps, Aleshire replaced centralized purchasing with a decentralized system that saved time and money by enabling department, division, and unit quartermasters to procure supplies locally.

==== World War I ====
Sharpe succeeded his friend and was named the 24th quartermaster general on September 16, 1916; his term in office was to end on July 21, 1918. His appointment predated the entry of the United States to World War I by seven months. The Quartermaster Corps and the War Department generally were unprepared for World War I. The supply bureaus within the Quartermaster Corps were eager to procure and ship as quickly as possible the enormous quantities of supplies for which they were responsible. However, their uncoordinated procurement due to the Sharpe-Aleshire decentralization resulted in excessive and unbalanced railway shipments that overtaxed port facilities and finally developed into a serious congestion of the railroad system in the winter of 1917–18. By that time shortages in clothing, hospital equipment, and other supplies were causing hardships in Army camps, and it was charged by some that the lack of adequate clothing and shelter was responsible for an epidemic of pneumonia sweeping through the camps. General Sharpe was held responsible by many for a large share of the supply crisis that had developed.

These developments stirred a widespread uneasiness that led to a Congressional hearing on the conduct of the war. In the end the General Staff took complete control of supplies and the Office of the Director of Purchase and Storage in the Purchase, Storage, and Traffic Division was erected on the foundation of the Quartermaster Corps.

On December 15, 1917, a War Council was formed (as distinct from the Council of National Defense) consisting of the Chief of Staff of the United States Army Tasker H. Bliss, the Secretary of War Newton D. Baker, his Assistant and some subordinates amongst whom were Quartermaster General Henry Granville Sharpe and Chief of Ordnance William Crozier. The War Council was to oversee and coordinate all matters of supply and to plan for the more effective use of the military power of the nation. While serving on the Council on 18 December 1917, General Sharpe was required to delegate all his administrative duties to an acting chief Quartermaster designated by the Secretary of War Newton D. Baker to be George Washington Goethals. Baker fired three of the five officers appointed to the War Council on that day.

In June 1918, General Sharpe was relieved from duty with the War Council and assigned to the command of the Southeastern Department. The following month he was appointed a major general in the line of the Army, with rank from July 12 and officially ceased to be Quartermaster General.

==== World War II ====
In 1940 Edmund B. Gregory was appointed as the Army's Quartermaster General, advancing from colonel directly to major general. In 1945 he was promoted to lieutenant general, the first Quartermaster Officer to attain this rank. As Quartermaster General during World War II, he oversaw the development, procurement and distribution of billions of dollars' worth of equipment and supplies. Gregory also supervised the training of thousands of quartermaster soldiers. In addition, he had responsibility for over 900,000 civilian personnel employed by contractors to produce supplies, equipment, ammunition and vehicles for the war effort.

==== Post-war years ====
On July 30, 1999, Major General Hawthorne L. Proctor was named the 46th Quartermaster General. He was the first African-American to hold the position.

=== 21st century ===
Twelve officers held the office of quartermaster general in the United States Army in the twenty-first century.

Major General Hawthorne L. Proctor: Major General Hawthorne L. Proctor served as the 46th Quartermaster General and Commandant of the Quartermaster School at Fort Lee, Virginia from 30 July 1999 to 11 July 2001. Brigadier General Proctor became the first African American Quartermaster Corps General.

Major General Terry E. Juskowiak: Major General Scott G. West served as the 47th Quartermaster General and Commandant of the Quartermaster School at Fort Lee, Virginia from 11 July 2001 to 16 May 2003.

Brigadier General Scott G. West: Brigadier General Scott G. West served as the 48th Quartermaster General and Commandant of the Quartermaster School at Fort Lee, Virginia from 16 May 2003 to 11 August 2005.

Brigadier General Mark A. Bellini: Brigadier General Mark A. Bellini served as the 49th Quartermaster General and Commandant of the Quartermaster School at Fort Lee, Virginia from 11 August 2005 to 26 October 2007.

Brigadier General Jesse R. Cross: Brigadier General Jesse R. Cross served as the 50th Quartermaster General and Commandant of the Quartermaster School at Fort Lee, Virginia from 26 October 2007 to 22 November 2010. Jesse Cross

Brigadier General Gwen Bingham: Brigadier General Gwen Bingham served as the 51st Quartermaster General and Commandant of the Quartermaster School at Fort Lee, Virginia from 22 November 2010 to 30 August 2012. Brigadier General Gwen Bingham became the first female to serve as Quartermaster General and the first female African American Quartermaster Corps General. She assumed command of the Quartermaster Corps from Brigadier General Jesse Cross on November 23, 2010. Bingham was promoted to brigadier general in April 2011. She was promoted to major general in 2013. In 2014 Bingham became the first female officer to serve as Commanding General of the U.S. Army Tank-Automotive and Armaments Life Cycle Management Command, in Warren, Michigan. In 2016, Bingham was promoted to lieutenant general, and became the 14th U.S. Army assistant chief of staff for installation management (ACSIM). Gwen Bingham

Brigadier General John E. O'Neil IV Brigadier General John E. O'Neil IV served as the 52nd Quartermaster General and Commandant of the Quartermaster School at Fort Lee, Virginia from 14 June 2013 to 9 June 2014. He currently serves as the Director for Logistics, Engineering and Security Cooperation (J4), U.S. Pacific Command, Camp H. M. Smith, Hawaii. John E. O'Neil IV

Brigadier General Ronald Kirklin Brigadier General Ronald Kirklin served as the 53rd Quartermaster General and Commandant of the Quartermaster School at Fort Lee, Virginia from 9 June 2014 to 10 June 2016. Ronald Kirklin

Brigadier General Rodney D. Fogg Brigadier General Rodney D. Fogg served as the 54th Quartermaster General and Commandant of the Quartermaster School at Fort Lee, Virginia from 10 June 2016 to 12 June 2018. Fogg served as the Commanding General of the Combined Arms Support Command and Sustainment Center of Excellence, CASCOM, Fort Lee, Virginia. Rodney D. Fogg

Brigadier General Douglas M. McBride: Brigadier General Douglas M. McBride, Jr. served as the 55th Quartermaster General and Commandant of the Quartermaster School at Fort Lee, Virginia from June 2018 to 29 May 2020. McBride was appointed as the interim commander of the US Army Combined Arms Command / Sustainment Center of Excellence on 23 August 2018. Douglas M. McBride Jr.

Brigadier General Michelle K. Donahue: Michelle K. Donahue became the Army's 56th Quartermaster General May 29, 2020 through June 22, 2022. Donahue pinned on the rank of brigadier general during a promotion ceremony June 24 at the Army Women's Museum.

Brigadier General Michael B. Siegl: Brigadier General Michael B. Siegl is the 57th and current United States Army Quartermaster General and Commandant of the United States Army Quartermaster School. Siegl is the first Asian American Quartermaster Corps Commandant and general. Siegl was promoted to brigadier general in September 2022.

== List of Army Quartermasters General ==
No.	Portrait	Name (born–died)	Term of office			Ref.
No.	Portrait	Name (born–died)	Took office	Left office	Time in office	Ref.
1.		MG Thomas Mifflin	August 14, 1775	May 16, 1776	276 days	
2.		COL Stephen Moylan	June 5, 1776	September 27, 1776	114 days	
1.		MG Thomas Mifflin	October 1, 1776	November 17, 1777	1 year, 47 days	
3.		MG Nathanael Greene	March 2, 1778	August 5, 1780	2 years, 156 days	
4.		COL Timothy Pickering	August 5, 1780	July 25, 1785	4 years, 354 days	
5.		Samuel Hodgdon	March 4, 1791	April 19, 1792	1 year, 46 days	
6.		James O'Hara	April 19, 1792	May 1, 1796	4 years, 12 days	
7.		MG John Wilkins, Jr.	June 1, 1796	June 1, 1802	6 years, 0 days	
8.		BG Morgan Lewis	April 3, 1812	March 2, 1813	333 days	
9.		BG Robert Swartwout	March 21, 1813	June 5, 1816	3 years, 76 days	
10.		COL James Mullany	April 29, 1816	April 14, 1818	1 year, 350 days	
11.		COL George Gibson	April 29, 1816	April 14, 1818	1 year, 350 days	
12.		BG Thomas S. Jesup	May 8, 1818	June 10, 1860	42 years, 33 days	
13.		BG Joseph E. Johnston	June 20, 1860	April 22, 1861	306 days	
14.		BG Montgomery C. Meigs	May 15, 1861	August 1, 1863	2 years, 78 days	
Acting		COL Charles Thomas	August 1, 1863	January 9, 1864	161 days	
14.		BG Montgomery C. Meigs	January 9, 1864	February 6, 1882	18 years, 28 days	
15.		BG Daniel H. Rucker	February 13, 1882	February 23, 1882	10 days	
16.		BG Rufus Ingalls	February 23, 1882	July 1, 1883	1 year, 128 days	
17.		BG Samuel B. Holabird	July 1, 1883	June 16, 1890	6 years, 350 days	
18.		BG Richard Batchelder	June 26, 1890	July 27, 1896	6 years, 31 days	
19.		BG Charles G. Sawtelle	August 19, 1896	February 16, 1897	181 days	
20.		BG George H. Weeks	February 16, 1897	February 3, 1898	352 days	
21.		BG Marshall I. Ludington	February 3, 1898	April 12, 1903	5 years, 68 days	
22.		BG Charles F. Humphrey	April 12, 1903	July 1, 1907	4 years, 80 days	
23.		MG James B. Aleshire	July 1, 1907	September 12, 1916	9 years, 73 days	
24.		MG Henry G. Sharpe	September 16, 1916	July 21, 1918	1 year, 308 days	
25.		MG Harry Lovejoy Rogers	July 22, 1918	August 27, 1922	4 years, 36 days	
26.		MG William H. Hart	August 28, 1922	January 2, 1926	3 years, 127 days	
27.		MG B. Frank Cheatham	January 3, 1926	January 17, 1930	4 years, 14 days	
28.		MG John L. DeWitt	February 3, 1930	February 3, 1934	4 years, 0 days	
29.		MG Louis H. Bash	February 3, 1934	March 31, 1936	2 years, 57 days	
30.		MG Henry Gibbins	April 1, 1936	March 31, 1940	3 years, 365 days	
31.		LTG Edmund B. Gregory	April 1, 1940	January 31, 1946	5 years, 305 days	
32.		MG Thomas B. Larkin	February 1, 1946	March 21, 1949	3 years, 48 days	
33.		MG Herman Feldman	March 21, 1949	September 28, 1951	2 years, 191 days	
34.		MG George A. Horkan	September 29, 1951	January 1954	2 years, 3 months	
35.		MG Kester L. Hastings	February 1954	March 1957	3 years, 1 month	
36.		MG Andrew T. McNamara	June 1957	June 11, 1961	4 years	
37.		MG Webster Anderson	June 12, 1961	July 31, 1962	1 year, 49 days	
38.		MG Harry L. Dukes, Jr.	July 15, 1981	March 29, 1984	2 years, 258 days	
39.		MG Eugene L. Stillions, Jr.	March 29, 1984	June 4, 1987	3 years, 67 days	
40.		MG William T. McLean	June 15, 1987	July 14, 1989	2 years, 29 days	
41.		MG Paul J. Vanderploog	July 14, 1989	June 3, 1991	1 year, 324 days	
42.		BG John J. Cusick	July 24, 1991	August 3, 1993	2 years, 10 days	
43.		MG Robert K. Guest	August 3, 1993	June 21, 1996	2 years, 323 days	
44.		MG Henry T. Glisson	June 21, 1996	June 10, 1997	354 days	
45.		MG James M. Wright	June 10, 1997	July 30, 1999	2 years, 50 days	
46.		MG Hawthorne L. Proctor	July 30, 1999	July 11, 2001	1 year, 346 days	
47.		MG Terry E. Juskowiak	July 11, 2001	May 16, 2003	1 year, 309 days	
48.		BG Scott G. West	May 16, 2003	August 11, 2005	2 years, 87 days	
49.		BG Mark A. Bellini	August 11, 2005	October 26, 2007	2 years, 76 days	
50.		BG Jesse R. Cross	October 26, 2007	November 22, 2010	3 years, 27 days	
51.		BG Gwen Bingham	November 22, 2010	August 30, 2012	1 year, 282 days	
52.		BG John E. O'Neil IV	June 14, 2013	June 9, 2014	360 days	
53.		BG Ronald Kirklin	June 9, 2014	June 10, 2016	2 years, 1 day	
54.		BG Rodney D. Fogg	June 10, 2016	June 12, 2018	2 years, 2 days	
55.		BG Douglas M. McBride Jr.	June 12, 2018	May 29, 2020	1 year, 352 days	
56.		BG Michelle K. Donahue	May 29, 2020	June 22, 2022	2 years, 24 days	
57.		BG Michael B. Siegl	June 22, 2022	June 2, 2023	345 days	
58.		COL Jin H. Pak	June 2, 2023	July 12, 2024	1 year, 40 days	
59.		COL Erin C. Miller	July 12, 2024	June 2025	11 months	
59		COL. Kevin W. Agness	June 2025	Incumbent		

== See also ==
- Military supply
- Quartermaster
- Quartermaster Center and School
- Quartermaster Corps (United States Army)
- Quartermaster general
