= General O'Neil =

General O'Neil or O'Neill may refer to:

- Archie E. O'Neil (1905–1986), U.S. Marine Corps brigadier general
- David F. O'Neill (1904–1963), U.S. Marine Corps major general
- Edward J. O'Neill (general) (1902–1979), U.S. Army lieutenant general
- Jack O'Neill fictional U.S. Air Force lieutenant general in Stargate media
- James Hugh O'Neill (1892–1972), U.S. Army brigadier general
- John E. O'Neil IV (fl. 1980s–2020s), U.S. Army brigadier general
- Joseph P. O'Neil (1863–1938), U.S. Army brigadier general
- Malcolm Ross O'Neill (born 1940), U.S. Army lieutenant general
- Mark J. O'Neil (born 1964), U.S. Army major general
- Owen Roe O'Neill (c. 1585–1649), Ulster Army general
- Ralph Ambrose O'Neill (1896–1980), Mexican American Air Force brigadier general
