= Gwen Bingham =

American general (born 1959)

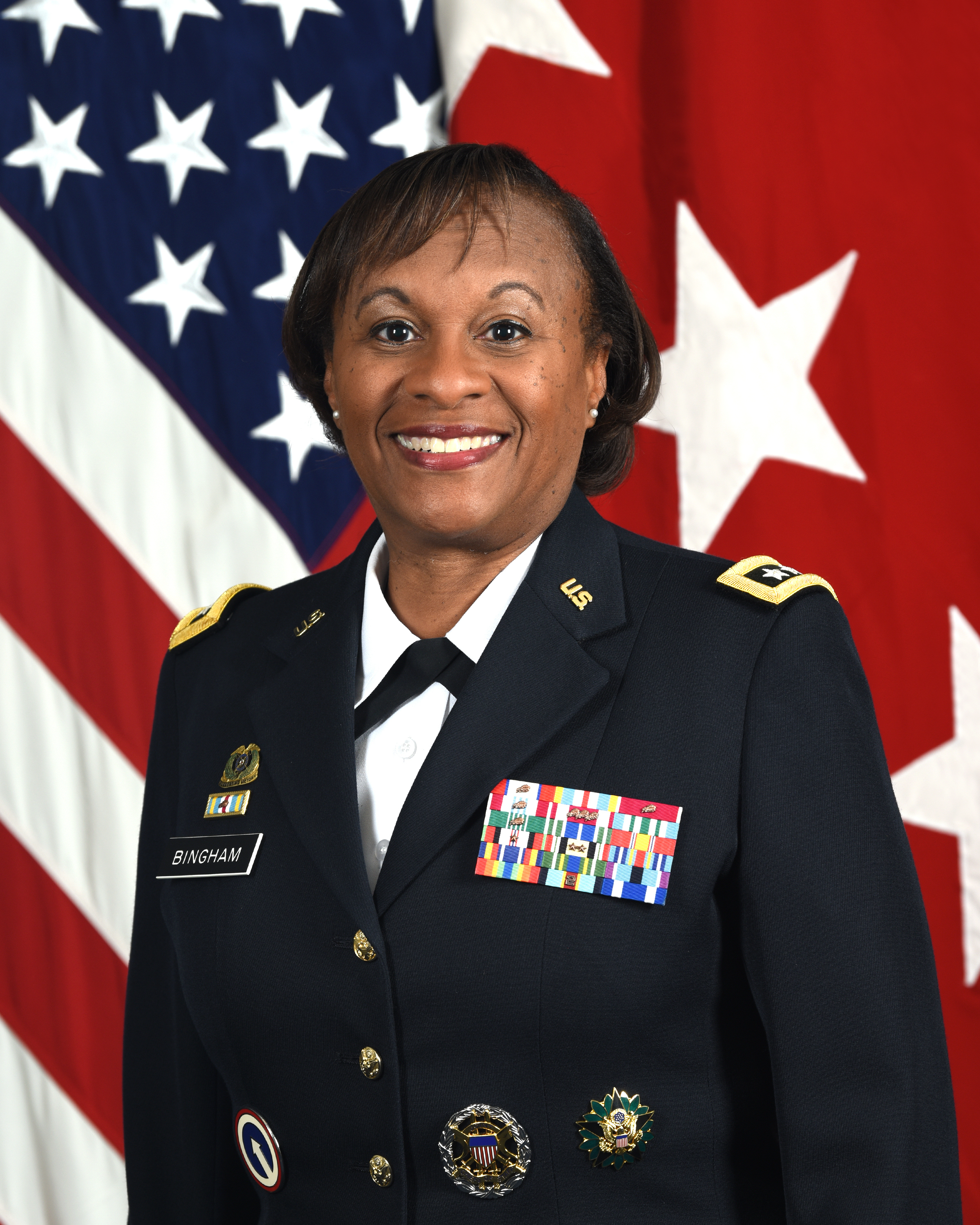
- Born: 1959 (age 66–67); Troy, Alabama, U.S.
- Military career
- Allegiance: United States
- Branch: United States Army
- Service years: 1981–2019
- Rank: Lieutenant General
- Commands: TACOM Life Cycle Management Command; White Sands Missile Range; United States Army Quartermaster School
- Conflicts: War in Afghanistan; Iraq War
- Awards: Army Distinguished Service Medal (2); Defense Superior Service Medal; Legion of Merit (2)

Lieutenant General Gwendolyn Bingham (born 1959) is a retired officer of the United States Army who served as the Assistant Chief of Staff for Installation Management from 2016 to 2019. Bingham previously served as the Commander of the TACOM Life Cycle Management Command headquartered at the Detroit Arsenal in Warren, Michigan, and as the Commanding General, White Sands Missile Range, New Mexico. She was the 51st Quartermaster General of the United States Army and Commandant of the United States Army Quartermaster School at Fort Lee, Virginia – the first female officer to hold these positions.

In March 2020, Bingham was elected to the Owens & Minor, Inc. Board of Directors.

== Education ==
Gwen Bingham is a native of Troy, Alabama. She graduated from the University of Alabama with a Bachelor of Science degree in general business management. She was commissioned a second lieutenant in the Quartermaster Corps as a distinguished military graduate of Army ROTC. She has a Master of Science in Administration from Central Michigan University and a Master of Science in national security strategy and resources from the National Defense University.

Bingham's military schooling includes the Quartermaster Officer Basic and Advanced Courses; the Personnel Management Course; Combined Arms and Services Staff School; Commissary Management Course; Army Command and General Staff College; the Industrial College of the Armed Forces, and the Army Inspector General Course.

== Military career ==
Bingham has served in a myriad of staff and leadership positions throughout her career to include: Platoon Leader and Executive Officer, HQ&A Company, 9th Supply and Transport Battalion, 9th DISCOM, Fort Lewis, Washington; Battalion S1, 2d Forward Support Battalion, 9th DISCOM, Fort Lewis, Washington; Field Services Officer, 1st COSCOM, Fort Bragg, North Carolina; Group S1/Adjutant, 507th Transportation Group, 1st COSCOM, Fort Bragg, North Carolina; OIC, Commissary Central Distribution Center, Defense Commissary Agency (DeCA), Manheim, Germany; Chief, Aviation Supply Branch, 4th Corps Materiel Management Center, Fort Hood, Texas; Battalion S3 and Battalion Executive Officer, 4th Corps Materiel Management Center, Fort Hood, Texas; Chief, Plans Division, ACofS, Materiel, 13th COSCOM, Fort Hood, Texas.

Chief, G3 Plans Division, 13th COSCOM; Deputy Commander, 64th Corps Support Group, 13th COSCOM, Fort Hood, Texas; Executive Officer, ACofS, J1, USFK, Yongsan, Korea; Commander, 266th Quartermaster Battalion, 23d Quartermaster Brigade, Fort Lee, Virginia; Chief, Support Services Office and Deputy Inspector General, Joint Staff, The Pentagon; Commander, United States Army Garrison, Fort Lee, Virginia and Chief of Staff, United States Army Combined Arms Support Command and Sustainment Center of Excellence, Fort Lee, Virginia; Operations Iraqi Freedom and Enduring Freedom as Special Assistant to the Commanding General, 1st Theater Sustainment Command, Camp Arifjan, Kuwait; Kabul, Afghanistan and Kandahar, Afghanistan; Commander, White Sands Missile Range, New Mexico.

Bingham was nominated for promotion to brigadier general on August 27, 2010, and received that rank on April 22, 2011. The President sent her nomination for promotion to major general to Congress on March 20, 2013.

On June 25, 2014, Bingham became the first female commander of the United States Army TACOM Life Cycle Management Command (TACOM LCMC). Bingham retired in 2019.

== Awards and decorations ==
Gwen Bingham's awards and decorations
Army Distinguished Service Medal with oak leaf cluster
Defense Superior Service Medal
Legion of Merit with oak leaf cluster
Defense Meritorious Service Medal with oak leaf cluster
Meritorious Service Medal with three oak leaf clusters
Joint Service Commendation Medal
Army Commendation Medal with oak leaf cluster
Army Achievement Medal
National Defense Service Medal
Afghanistan Campaign Medal
Iraqi Campaign Medal
Global War on Terrorism Expeditionary Medal
Global War on Terrorism Service Medal
Korean Defense Service Medal
Humanitarian Service Medal
Army Service Ribbon
Army Overseas Service Ribbon
NATO Medal

Joint Chiefs of Staff Identification Badge

Bingham was awarded the Distinguished Order of Saint Martin in 2002, and was a Women in Defense Michigan 2014 Excellence in Leadership Award Nominee.

Military offices
Preceded by Jesse Cross	Quartermaster General of the United States Army; 2010–2012	Succeeded by John E. O'Neil IV
