= Ronald Kirklin =

American Brigadier General

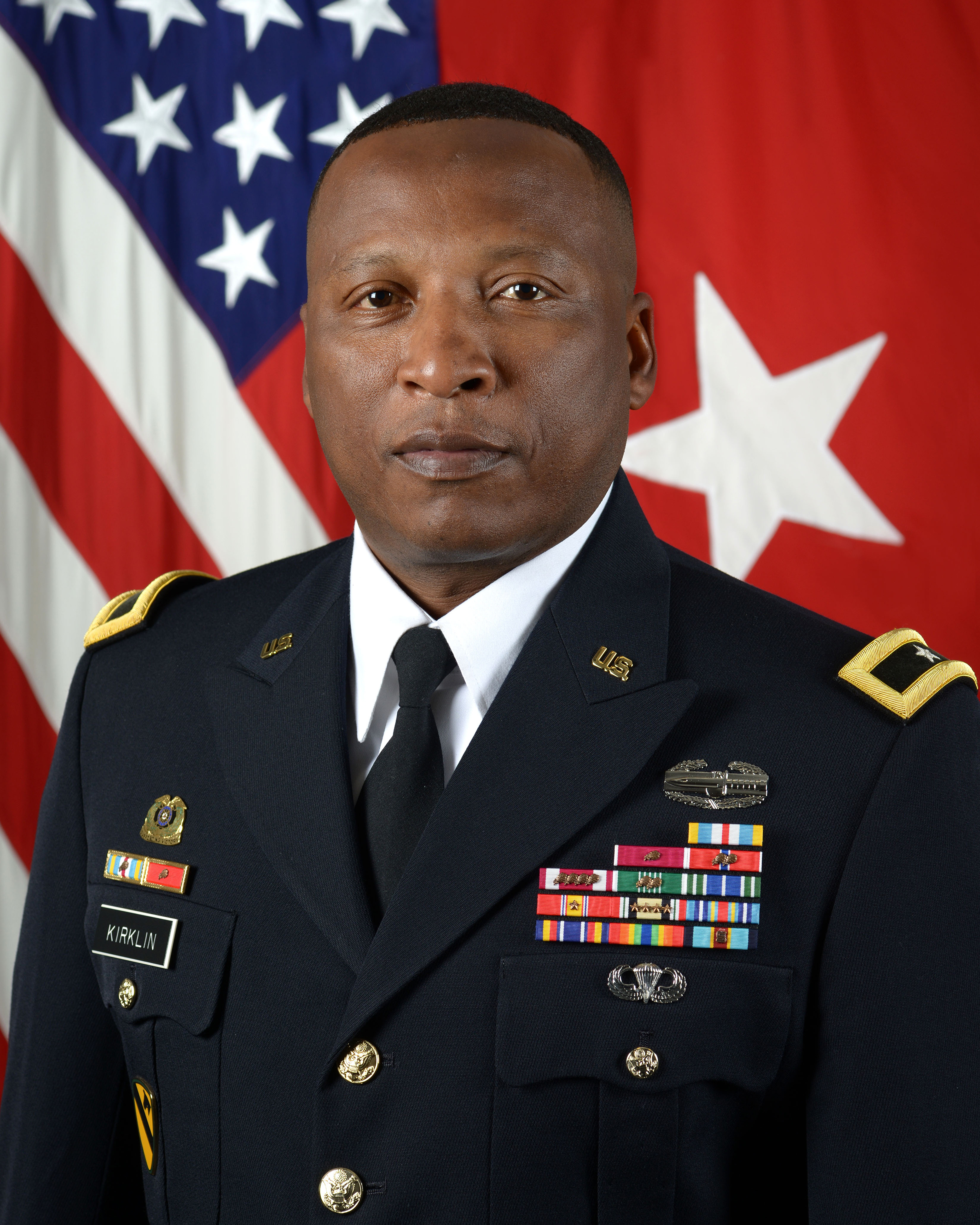
- Military career
- Allegiance: United States
- Branch: United States Army
- Service years: 1988–2016
- Rank: Brigadier General
- Commands: Commandant, United States Army Quartermaster School

Brigadier General Ronald Kirklin is a retired general officer in the United States Army. Kirklin was the 53rd Quartermaster General and Commandant of the Quartermaster School at Fort Lee, Virginia from 2014 to 2016.

== Military education ==
Kirklin, a native of Lexington, Mississippi, graduated from Mississippi Valley State University as a Distinguished Military Graduate. He holds a master's degree in Adult and Continuing Education from Kansas State University and a master's degree in Strategic Studies from the United States Army War College. His military education includes the Quartermaster Officer Basic and Advanced Courses, the Command and General Staff College, and the United States Army War College.

== Military career ==
Kirklin's military service began in the 11th Armored Cavalry Regiment, in Fulda, Germany, where from 1988 to 1991, he served as a Platoon Leader, General Supply Officer, and Squadron S4, Combat Support Squadron. After graduating from the Advanced Course, he was assigned to the 5th Infantry Division, at Fort Polk, Louisiana, from 1992 to 1993, as a Class IX Accountable Officer. From 1993 to 1996, he was assigned to the 124th Main Support Battalion, 2nd Armored Division, at Fort Hood, Texas, as the Supply and Services Officer, Support Operations Officer, and later as the Light Maintenance Company Commander. After completion of Company Command, he served as the Task Force XXI Combat Systems Manager, 4th Infantry Division.

From 1996 to 1999, Kirklin was assigned to Hohenfels, Germany, where he functioned as the Combat Service Support Observer/Controller on the Grizzlies and Timberwolves Maneuver Teams, and later as the Operations Group S4. From 1999 to 2000, he was a student at the Command and General Staff College, at Fort Leavenworth, Kansas. Kirklin was then assigned to the 1st Cavalry Division, at Fort Hood, from 2000 to 2002, where he was the Executive Officer in the 215th Forward Support Battalion, 3rd Brigade Combat Team, 1st Cavalry Division, and 1st Cavalry Division DISCOM S3. His following assignment was as the Course Director, Combined Captains Career Course, at Fort Lee, Virginia, from 2002 to 2004.

In 2004, Kirklin returned to Fort Hood, and was again assigned to the 1st Cavalry Division DISCOM, as Deputy Commander while deployed to Taji, Iraq, during Operation Iraqi Freedom. After re-deployment in March 2005, he assumed Command of the 215th Brigade Support Battalion, 3rd Brigade Combat Team, at Fort Hood, on 14 July 2005. As commander, he deployed the battalion to Operation Iraqi Freedom 2006–08, Diyala Province, Iraq, and then recovered the unit back to Fort Hood.

After relinquishing Battalion Command in March 2008, he attended the US Army War College, at Carlisle Barracks, Pennsylvania. After graduating from the War College in 2009, Kirklin returned to Fort Hood, and assumed command of the 4th Sustainment Brigade on 14 July 2009. He deployed as the 4th Sustainment Brigade to Tallil, Iraq, in support of Operation New Dawn in February 2011. Kirklin redeployed the Brigade from Tallil, Iraq, in December 2011, after serving as the final Sustainment Brigade to close out sustainment and retrograde operations to end Operation New Dawn. In January 2012, Kirklin was assigned to the United States Central Command J4, in Tampa, Florida, as Chief of Current Operations.

Kirklin became the Commandant of the Quartermaster School on 9 June 2014. He was promoted to Brigadier General on 5 December 2014.

== Awards and decorations ==
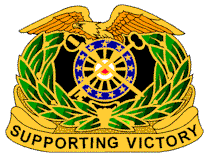
| Combat Action Badge |
| Basic Parachutist Badge |
| 1st Cavalry Division Combat Service Identification Badge |
| U.S. Army Quartermaster Corps Distinctive Unit Insignia |
| 5 Overseas Service Bars |

| Defense Superior Service Medal |
| Legion of Merit with one bronze oak leaf cluster |
| Bronze Star Medal with two oak leaf clusters |
| Meritorious Service Medal with four oak leaf clusters |
| Army Commendation Medal with two oak leaf clusters |
| Army Achievement Medal |
| Joint Meritorious Unit Award with oak leaf cluster |
| Meritorious Unit Commendation with oak leaf cluster |
| National Defense Service Medal with one bronze service star |
| Iraqi Campaign Medal with four service stars |
| Global War on Terrorism Expeditionary Medal |
| Global War on Terrorism Service Medal |
| Army Service Ribbon |
| Army Overseas Service Ribbon with bronze award numeral 5 |

Military offices
| Preceded by Brigadier General John E. O'Neil IV | Quartermaster General of the United States Army; 2014–2016 | Succeeded by Brigadier General Rodney D. Fogg |
