= Douglas M. McBride Jr. =

American Army general (born 1966)

Douglas M. McBride, Jr.
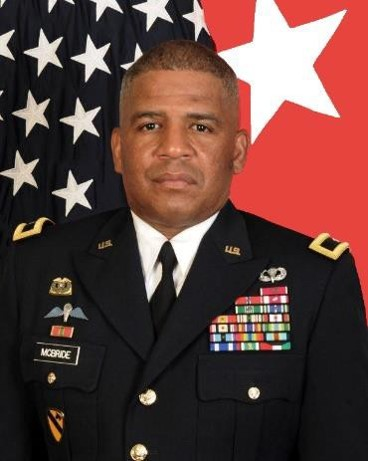
- Brigadier General Douglas M. McBride, Jr.
- Born: 7 March 1966 (age 60)
- Military career
- Allegiance: United States
- Branch: United States Army
- Service years: 1989–2020
- Rank: Brigadier General
- Nickname: Doug
- Awards: Legion of Merit (3); Bronze Star Medal (2)

Brigadier General Douglas M. McBride, Jr. (born 7 March 1966) is a retired general officer in the United States Army who served as the 55th Quartermaster General and Commandant of the Quartermaster School at Fort Lee, Virginia. McBride was appointed as the interim commander of the US Army Combined Arms Command / Sustainment Center of Excellence on 23 August 2018.

== Early life ==
McBride was born in New York City, but was raised in Central Islip, New York. He graduated from Central Islip Senior High School. After earning football and ROTC Scholarships, he received his Bachelor of Science Degree in Business Administration from Northeastern University in Boston, Massachusetts, and was commissioned as a second lieutenant in the Ordnance Corps in 1989.

== Education ==
He is a graduate of the Ordnance Officer Basic and Advanced Courses, the College of Naval Command and Staff where he earned a Master of Arts in National Security and Strategic Studies, and the Air War College where he earned a Master of Arts in Strategic Studies. McBride also earned a Master of Science in Human Resources Management from the University of Central Texas.

== Military career ==
McBride's first assignment was as the Maintenance Platoon Leader of Company C, 27th Main Support Battalion, 1st Cavalry Division, Fort Hood, Texas. He led his platoon into combat during the Gulf War 1990–91. He then served as the Company Direct Support Maintenance Shop Officer, Class IX Technical Supply Officer, and Executive Officer.

Following graduation from the Ordnance Officer Advanced Course and promotion to the rank of captain, he served as Battalion S-1 for the 23rd Support Group at Camp Humphreys, Korea. McBride's next assignment was as the Chief of the 507th Material Management Team, 2nd Corps Support Center (CMMC), 1st Corps Support Command, Fort Bragg, North Carolina. He then took command of the 39th Ordnance Company (Airborne), 7th Transportation Battalion, 507th Corps Support Group. After company command he served as the Ordnance Branch Captain's Assignment Manager, Human Resource Command, Alexandria, Virginia.

Following promotion to the rank of major, and attendance at the Naval Command and Staff College in Newport, Rhode Island, McBride was assigned as the S-4, 2nd Brigade, 25th Infantry Division (Light), Schofield Barracks, Hawaii. He then served as the Support Operations Officer and Battalion Executive Officer in the 725th Main Support Battalion, 25th Infantry Division Support Command. McBride's next assignment was as the Deputy Inspector General, US First Army, Fort Gillem, Georgia.

After promotion to the rank of lieutenant colonel and selection for tactical battalion command, McBride assumed command of the Special Troops Battalion, 3rd Sustainment Brigade, Fort Stewart, Georgia. He deployed his battalion to Iraq, where it served as part of the Surge Campaign during the Iraq War from 2007 to 2009. After battalion command McBride was assigned as the executive officer to the G-4, Army Forces Command, Fort McPherson, Georgia.

Upon graduation from the Air War College, Maxwell Air Force Base, Alabama he returned to Fort Gillem, Georgia, where he served as Assistant Deputy Chief of Staff, G-4, Army Forces Command. McBride then commanded the 593d Sustainment Brigade, Joint Base Lewis-McChord, Washington. He deployed elements of the 593rd to Afghanistan, where he led the CENTCOM Materiel Recovery Element (CMRE). Upon return from deployment he inactivated the Sustainment Brigade and converted it to the 593rd Expeditionary Sustainment Command.

McBride then served as the G-3/5/7 of the Combined Arms Support Command (CASCOM) at Fort Lee, Virginia. His last assignment was as the commanding general of the 13th Sustainment Command (Expeditionary) at Fort Hood, Texas.

McBride retired from the Army in 2020.

== Military courses ==
- Support Operations Course
- Inspector General Course
- Joint Logistics Course
- Joint Personnel Recovery Course

== Awards and decorations ==
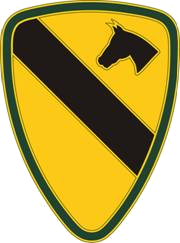
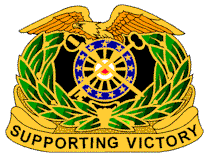
Basic Parachutist Badge
British Parachutist Badge
1st Cavalry Division Combat Service Identification Badge
U.S. Army Quartermaster Corps Distinctive Unit Insignia

Legion of Merit with two bronze oak leaf clusters
Bronze Star Medal with one oak leaf cluster
Meritorious Service Medal with five oak leaf clusters
Army Commendation Medal with one oak leaf cluster
Army Achievement Medal with one oak leaf clusters
Army Superior Unit Award
National Defense Service Medal with one bronze service star
Southwest Asia Service Medal with service star
Iraq Campaign Medal with service star
Afghanistan Campaign Medal with service star
Global War on Terrorism Service Medal
Armed Forces Service Medal
Humanitarian Service Medal with service star
Army Service Ribbon
Army Overseas Service Ribbon with bronze award numeral 4
NATO Medal
Kuwait Liberation Medal (Saudi Arabia)
Kuwait Liberation Medal (Kuwait)

== See also ==
- Military supply
- Quartermaster
- Quartermaster Center and School
- Quartermaster Corps (United States Army)
- Quartermaster general

Military offices
Preceded by Brigadier General Rodney D. Fogg	Quartermaster General of the United States Army; 2018–2020	Succeeded by Colonel Michelle K. Donahue
