= Jesse Cross =

United States Army general

Jesse R. Cross
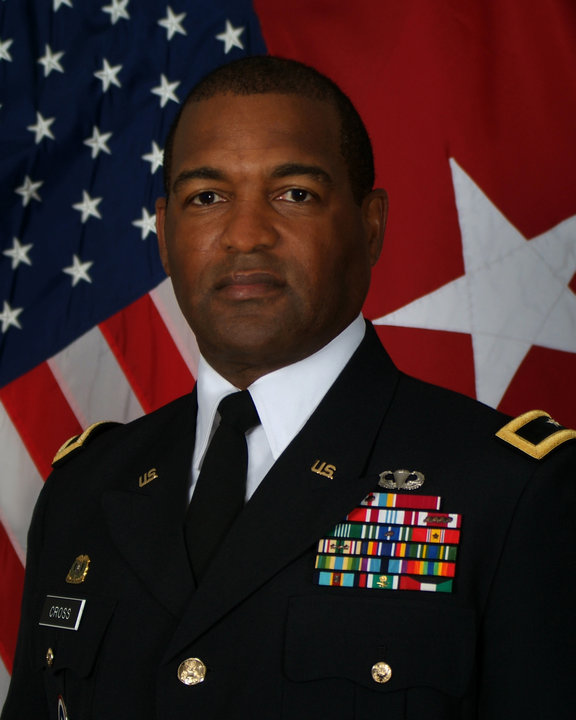
- Brigadier General Jesse Cross; 50th Quartermaster General of the United States Army
- Military career
- Allegiance: USA
- Branch: United States Army
- Service years: 1979 – 2011
- Rank: Brigadier General
- Commands: Commanding General, Combined Arms Support Command / Sustainment Center of Excellence (SCoE); Commanding General, United States Army Quartermaster School
- Awards: Defense Superior Service Medal (2); Legion of Merit; Bronze Star; Defense Meritorious Service Medal; Meritorious Service Medal (5); Army Commendation Medal

Brigadier General Jesse R. Cross, USA was the 50th Quartermaster General of the United States Army and the Commanding General of the U.S. Army Quartermaster School at Fort Lee, Virginia.

== Military career ==
Brigadier General Cross is a graduate of West Texas State University with a Bachelor of Business Administration degree in marketing and holds a Master of Science degree in logistics management from the Florida Institute of Technology. He was commissioned a Second Lieutenant, Quartermaster Corps through ROTC in 1979. He is a graduate of the Quartermaster Basic and Advanced Courses, the Command and General Staff College, and the U.S. Army War College.

Brigadier General Cross’ past assignments include: Platoon Leader, Property Book Officer, and Shop Officer, 225th Maintenance Company, Fort Sill, Oklahoma; Supply Control Officer, 2nd Supply and Transportation Battalion, 2nd Infantry Division, Camp Casey, Korea; Commander, Headquarters and Supply Company, 3rd Support Battalion, 9th Infantry Division, Fort Lewis, Washington; Assistant Professor of Military Science at Texas Tech University, Lubbock, Texas; Supply Management Officer, Materiel Management Center, Fort Hood, Texas; Support Operations Officer and Executive Officer, 3rd Support Battalion, 3rd Infantry Division, Schweinfurt, Germany; Logistics Staff Officer, Directorate of Logistics, U.S. Special Operations Command, MacDill Air Force Base, Florida; Commander, 125th Forward Support Battalion, 1st Armored Division, Fort Riley, Kansas; Senior Forward Support Battalion Observer Controller, Combat Maneuver Training Center, at the Hohenfels Training Area in Hohenfels, Germany; Support Operations Officer, 3D Corps Support Command, Wiesbaden, Germany; Commander, 200th Materiel Management Center, Kaiserslautern, Germany; and Plans Chief, J4, United States Central Command, MacDill Air Force Base, Florida.

Cross was promoted to Brigadier General in a ceremony held at the Defense Supply Center Philadelphia on December 2, 2005. His last assignment was as commander of the Defense Supply Center Philadelphia, Defense Logistics Agency. DSCP annually buys over $12.4 billion worth of food, clothing, textiles, medicines, medical supplies, construction and equipment items for American military personnel and other customers worldwide.

Cross was the 50th Quartermaster General and Commandant of the Quartermaster School at Fort Lee, Virginia relinquishing command on November 22, 2010. He commanded the Combined Arms Support Command / Sustainment Center of Excellence (SCoE) from June 11, 2010, to September 9, 2010.

Brigadier General Cross is married and has four children.

== Awards and decorations ==
Parachutist Badge

Defense Superior Service Medal with oak leaf cluster
Legion of Merit
Bronze Star
Defense Meritorious Service Medal
Meritorious Service Medal with four oak leaf clusters
Army Commendation Medal
Army Achievement Medal with oak leaf cluster
National Defense Service Medal with service star
Southwest Asia Service Medal with three service stars
Global War on Terrorism Service Medal
Korea Defense Service Medal
Armed Forces Service Medal
Humanitarian Service Medal
Army Service Ribbon
Army Overseas Service Ribbon
Kuwait Liberation Medal (Saudi Arabia)
Kuwait Liberation Medal (Kuwait)

Cross was inducted as a Distinguished Member of the Quartermaster Regiment in 2006 and was awarded the Distinguished Order of Saint Martin in 2003.

Military offices
Preceded by Mark A. Bellini	Quartermaster General of the United States Army; 2007–2010	Succeeded by Gwen Bingham
