= Marshall I. Ludington =

US Army Quartermaster General (1839–1919)

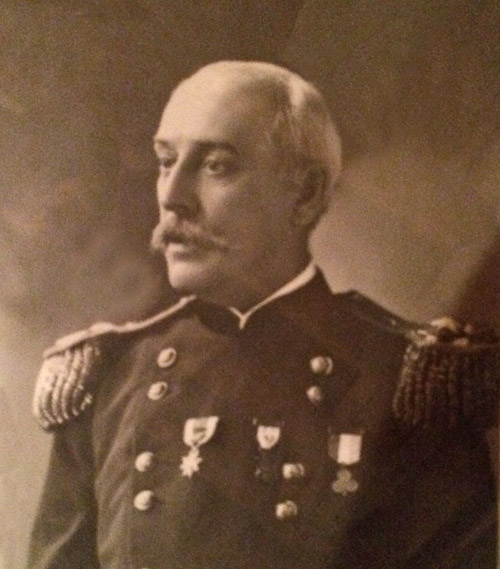
- Ludington as Quartermaster General of the Army, circa 1900
- Born: April 4, 1839; Somerset Township, Somerset County, Pennsylvania, US
- Died: July 26, 1919 (aged 80); Skaneateles, New York, US
- Burial place: Arlington National Cemetery
- Military career
- Allegiance: United States
- Branch: United States Army
- Service years: 1862–1903
- Rank: Major General
- Unit: U.S. Army Quartermaster Corps
- Commands: Philadelphia Quartermaster Depot; San Francisco Quartermaster Depot; New York City Quartermaster Depot; Quartermaster General of the United States Army
- Conflicts: American Civil War; American Indian Wars; Spanish–American War

Marshall Independence Ludington (July 4, 1839 – July 26, 1919) was a career officer in the United States Army. A veteran of the American Civil War, he attained the rank of brigadier general as Quartermaster General of the United States Army during the Spanish–American War. He was promoted to major general on April 12, 1903, and retired the following day.

== Early life ==
Marshall Independence Ludington was born in Somerset Township, Somerset County, Pennsylvania on July 4, 1839, the son of Zalmon Ludington and Lovila (Hagans) Ludington. His middle name derived from the fact that he was born on Independence Day. Ludington was raised in Somerset and Uniontown, and educated in the local schools. In the late 1850s, he was a student at Madison College in Uniontown.

== American Civil War ==
Ludington volunteered for military service during the American Civil War and in 1862 was commissioned in the Union Army as an assistant quartermaster of volunteers with the rank of captain. He was assigned as quartermaster of 2nd Division, II Corps. He served with the Army of the Potomac and took part in the battles of Fredericksburg, Chancellorsville, and Gettysburg. In the fall of 1863 he was assigned as quartermaster of the II Corps' Cavalry Division, and took part in the Battle of the Wilderness and the early stages of the Siege of Petersburg. In July 1864, Ludington was appointed quartermaster of 1st Division, II Corps, a post he retained until the end of the war in 1865. In 1867, he received brevet promotions to major, lieutenant colonel, colonel, and brigadier general of volunteers and lieutenant colonel in the regular army as recognition of the superior service he rendered throughout the war.

== Post-Civil War ==
After the war, Ludington remained in uniform and worked on the staff of the Army's Quartermaster General, where he was responsible for disposing of facilities and equipment that were not needed during the post-war period. He applied for a commission in the regular army and in 1867 was appointed a major in the quartermaster corps and assigned as chief quartermaster of the District of New Mexico, where he served for three years. In 1870, he was assigned to the staff of the Army's Quartermaster General, where he served until 1875. He was then assigned as chief quartermaster of the Department of the Platte, based in Omaha, Nebraska. He served until 1883, and was on extended leave in Europe when he was promoted to lieutenant colonel in March of that year.

After returning to the United States, Ludington served on temporary duty in the Quartermaster General's office until July, then took over as chief quartermaster of the Philadelphia Quartermaster Depot, where he served until 1889. He was then assigned as chief quartermaster of the San Francisco Quartermaster Depot, where he remained until 1890.

Ludington received promotion to colonel in 1890 and was assigned as the Army's Assistant Quartermaster General. In 1894 he was assigned as chief quartermaster of the Department of the Missouri, with headquarters in Chicago. He remained in this assignment until 1897, when he was assigned as chief quartermaster of the New York City Quartermaster Depot and the Department of the East.

== Spanish–American War ==
In February 1898, Ludingtion was promoted to brigadier general and assigned as Quartermaster General of the United States Army, succeeding George H. Weeks. He took charge of the Quartermaster department just 12 days before the sinking of the USS Maine in Havana, which started the Spanish–American War.

Long years of relative calm had left the small peacetime army unprepared for war, so Ludington had to work within War Department constraints to prepare for U.S. troops to fight overseas. Moving proactively, he instructed depot quartermasters to increase manufacturing of weapons and equipment, and to purchase additional material for clothing and tents. As soon as war was declared, the War Department lifted peacetime constraints, enabling Ludington's department to begin supplying and equipping the volunteers who answered the call to service and expanded the regular army.

Though hampered by lack of personnel and handicapped by laws that required detailed cost estimating, record keeping, and other bureaucratic delays, Ludington's department succeeded at obtaining and issuing large quantities of materiel within a short period during the spring and summer of 1898. During the war, Ludington was criticized for difficulties in providing food, clothing, and other supplies, and President William McKinley appointed a commission to investigate the conduct of the war. The commission, headed by General Grenville M. Dodge, identified several areas in which the Army was unprepared before the war, but avoided making anyone a scapegoat. While the Quartermaster department was the subject of specific criticism, the Dodge Commission attributed most of the problems with the war effort to general unpreparedness and a lack of trained officers that resulted from downsizing the Army during the years before the war started.

== Later career ==
In response to the need for garrisons in Cuba, Puerto Rico, and the Philippines, after the war the Army increased in size and took steps to improve readiness and training. Ludington oversaw construction programs to repair and expand barracks, storehouses, and other buildings at posts throughout the United States and its new territorial possessions. In addition, he took steps to develop clothing and equipment suitable for tropical climates. Ludington also developed the Army Transport Service to standardize the movement of troops, equipment, and supplies from the continental United States to its territories and back. In 1901, Ludington undertook an inspection tour of U.S. forces in the Pacific and Asia, which took him to China, Japan, the Philippines, and Hawaii. On April 12, 1903, Ludington was promoted to major general in recognition of the superior service he rendered throughout a career of more than 40 years.

== Retirement and death ==
Ludington retired the day after receiving his promotion to major general, and was succeeded as Quartermaster General by Charles Frederic Humphrey Sr. In retirement, Ludington was a resident of his wife's hometown, Skaneateles, New York. Ludington was a member of several legacy societies and professional military associations, including the General Society of the War of 1812, Military Order of the Loyal Legion of the United States, Society of the Army of the Potomac, and Military Order of Foreign Wars. He was an active member of the II Corps Veterans Association, and was elected its president in 1898.

Ludington died in Skaneateles on July 26, 1919. His funeral took place at St. John's Episcopal Church in Washington, DC. He was buried at Arlington National Cemetery.

== Family ==
In 1871, Ludington married Harriet Marvin, the daughter of William Marvin. They were married until her death in 1910, and had no children.

== Legacy ==
An U.S. military ship, U.S. Army Transport Ludington, was named in Ludington's honor. It was purchased by the Army in 1931, and used through World War II to transport Army supplies and the personal possessions of soldiers who were changing duty stations. USAT Ludington was scrapped in 1947.

== Sources ==
=== Internet ===
- "Brigadier General Marshall I. Ludington, 21st Quartermaster School Commandant, February 1898 – April 1903". Previous Quartermaster Commandants. Ft. Lee, VA: U.S. Army Quartermaster Corps. February 21, 2019.
- "1880 United States Federal Census, Entry for Marshall C. and Harriet Ludington". Ancestry.com. Lehi, UT: Ancestry.com, LLC. 1880.
- "1900 United States Federal Census, Entry for Marshall C. and Harriet Ludington". Ancestry.com. Lehi, UT: Ancestry.com, LLC. 1900.
- Roberts, Stephen S. (January 10, 2010). "Ludington (AK-37)". Quick Links to US Navy Auxiliary Ship Types, 1920–1945. Stephen S. Roberts.

=== Books ===
- The National Cyclopaedia of American Biography. Vol. XVIII. New York: James T. White & Company. 1922. p. 284 – via Google Books.
- Hadden, James (1913). A History of Uniontown: The County Seat of Fayette County, Pennsylvania. Uniontown, PA: J. Hadden. pp. 512–513. ISBN 9780788427480 – via Google Books.

=== Newspapers ===
- "The Second Army Corps: Survivors of a Valiant Command in Annual Meeting". The Evening Star. Washington, DC. January 13, 1898. p. 2 – via Newspapers.com.
- "Soldiers Praised By All In Orient". The Pacific Commercial Advertiser. Honolulu, HI. October 16, 1901. p. 1 – via Newspapers.com.
- "Will Go Up A Grade: Promotion of the Army's Quartermaster General". The Evening Star. Washington, DC. April 7, 1903. p. 2 – via Newspapers.com.
- "Funeral of Mrs. Ludington". The Evening Star. Washington, DC. January 28, 1910. p. 2 – via Newspapers.com.
- "General Ludington, Born July 4, 1839, Dies In Skaneateles". New-York Tribune. New York. July 29, 1919. p. 8 – via Newspapers.com.
- "Gen. Ludington's Funeral". The Washington Star. Washington, DC. July 29, 1919. p. 17 – via Newspapers.com.
- "U.S. Transport Ludington". The Honolulu Advertiser. Honolulu, HI. May 12, 1941. p. 14 – via Newspapers.com.
