= Thomas Jesup =

United States general (1788-1860)

Thomas Sidney Jesup
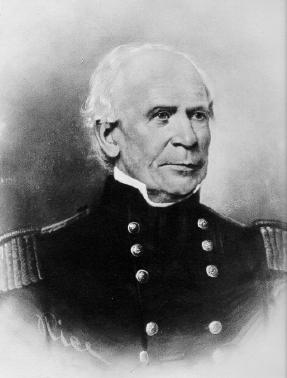
- Brigadier General Thomas Sidney Jesup; 13th quartermaster General of the United States Army

Quartermaster General of the United States Army
- In office May 8, 1818 – June 10, 1860
- President: See list: James Monroe John Quincy Adams Andrew Jackson Martin Van Buren William Henry Harrison John Tyler Zachary Taylor Millard Fillmore Franklin Pierce James Buchanan
- Preceded by: George Gibson
- Succeeded by: Joseph E. Johnston

Personal details
- Born: December 16, 1788 Berkeley County, Virginia (today West Virginia), United States
- Died: June 10, 1860 (aged 71) Washington, D.C., United States
- Resting place: Oak Hill Cemetery, Washington, D.C.

Military service
- Allegiance: United States
- Branch/service: United States Army
- Years of service: 1808–1860
- Rank: Brigadier General; Brevet Major General
- Battles/wars: War of 1812; Battle of Chippawa; Battle of Lundy's Lane (WIA); Second Seminole War; Mexican–American War

Thomas Sidney Jesup (December 16, 1788 – June 10, 1860) was a United States Army officer known as the "Father of the Modern Quartermaster Corps". His 52-year (1808–1860) military career was one of the longest in the history of the United States Army. Jesup is infamous for his direct role in the duplicitous capture of Osceola and Micanopy, two Seminole Nation chiefs.

== Biography ==
Thomas Jesup was born in Berkeley County, Virginia (now West Virginia). He began his military career in 1808, and served in the War of 1812, seeing action in the battles of Chippewa and Lundy's Lane in 1814, where he was wounded. He was aligned with the aggressive expansionism of Andrew Jackson, who became his immediate superior that year, and he was broadly dismissive of civilian control over the military. As of 1816 he was plotting to capture Cuba for the sake of American security.

He was appointed Quartermaster General on May 8, 1818, by President James Monroe.

=== Seminole War and controversy ===
In 1836, while Jesup was still officially Quartermaster General, President Andrew Jackson detached him first to deal with the Creek tribe in Georgia and Alabama, and then to assume command of all U.S. troops in Florida during the Second Seminole War (1835–1842). His capture of Seminole leaders Osceola and Micanopy under a false flag of truce provoked controversy in the United States and abroad. Many newspapers called for an inquiry and his firing but the government supported its general, and at the conclusion of the hostilities, Jesup returned to his official post. He was famously quoted as having declared about the Seminole that "[t]he country can be rid of them only by exterminating them."

=== Further service ===
During the Mexican–American War, Jesup traveled from his headquarters in Washington, D.C., to oversee the supplying of troops in Mexico. He served as Quartermaster General for 42 years, having the second longest continual service in the same position in U.S. military history (George Gibson served as Commissary General of the US Army for 43 years, from 1818 until 1860).

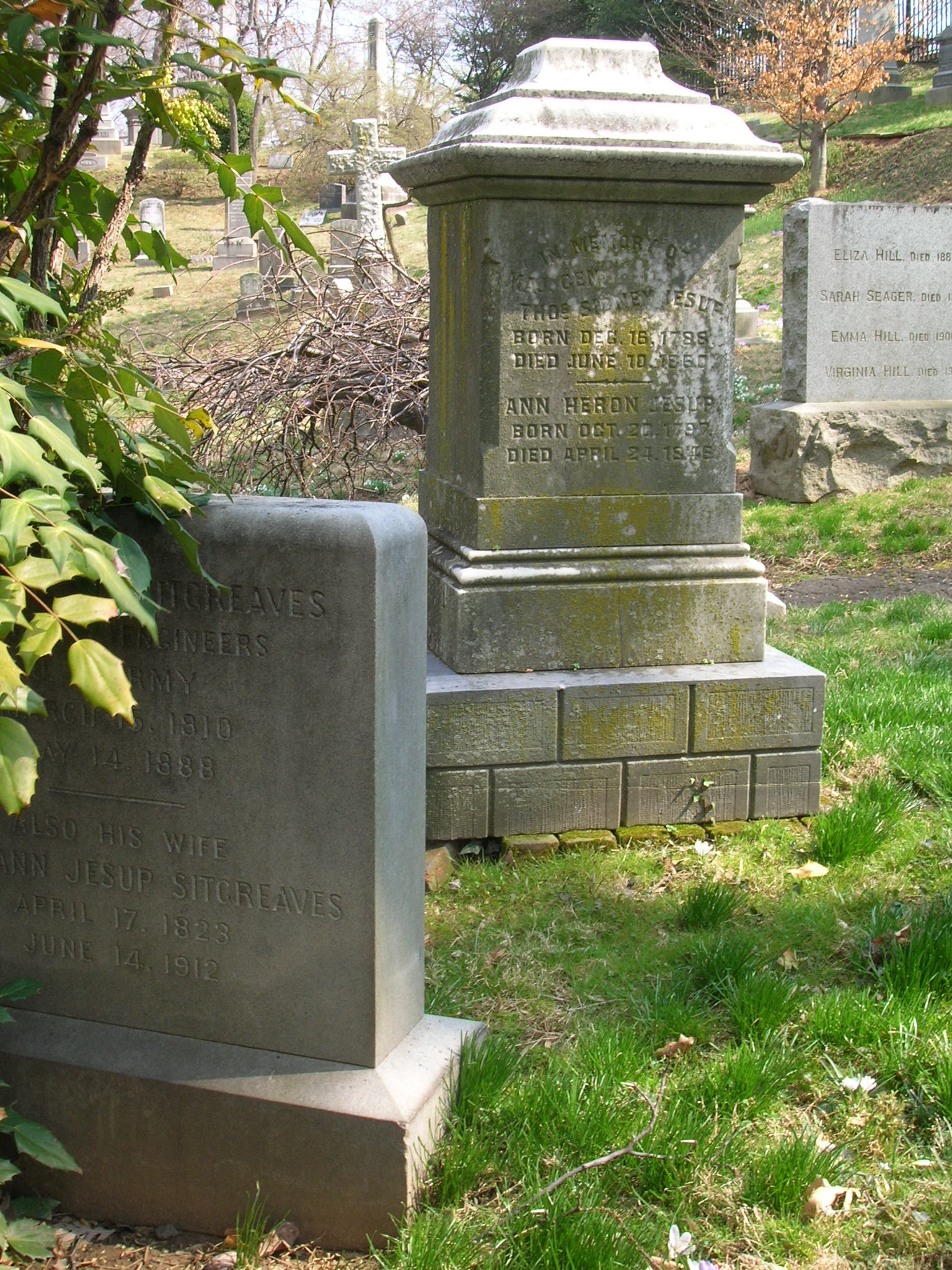
Grave of Jesup (right) at Oak Hill Cemetery

He died in office in Washington, D.C., on June 10, 1860, at age 71. He was buried at Oak Hill Cemetery.

== Dates of rank ==
- 2nd Lieutenant, 7th Infantry – 3 May 1808
- 1st Lieutenant, 7th Infantry – 1 December 1809
- Captain, 7th Infantry – 20 January 1813
- Major, 19th Infantry – 6 April 1813
- Major, 25th Infantry – 18 April 1814
- Brevet Lieutenant Colonel – 5 July 1814
- Brevet Colonel – 25 July 1814
- Major, 1st Infantry – 17 May 1815
- Lieutenant Colonel, 3rd Infantry – 30 April 1817
- Colonel, Assistant Adjutant General – 27 March 1818
- Brigadier General, Quartermaster General – 8 May 1818
- Brevet Major General – 8 May 1828

== Legacy and honors ==
- Jesup, Georgia; Lake Jesup, Florida; and Fort Jesup, Louisiana, were named in his honor.
- 1986, Jesup was inducted into the Quartermaster Hall of Fame.
- Battery Jesup at the Spanish–American War fort, Fort Fremont

Military offices
| Preceded by George Gibson | Quartermaster General of the United States Army; 1818–1860 | Succeeded by Joseph E. Johnston |
