= John E. O'Neil IV =

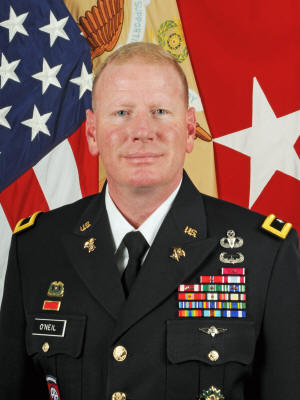
- Brigadier General John E. O'Neil IV
- Military career
- Allegiance: United States of America
- Branch: United States Army
- Service years: 1986–present
- Rank: Brigadier General
- Nickname: Skip
- Commands: Quartermaster General, United States Army Quartermaster School

Brigadier General John E. O'Neil IV is a serving officer in the United States Army who was the 52nd Quartermaster General and commandant of the U.S. Army Quartermaster School at Fort Lee, Virginia, from 2013 to 2014.

O'Neil served as the 52nd Quartermaster General from June 14, 2013, to June 9, 2014. He currently serves as the Director for Logistics, Engineering and Security Cooperation (J4), U.S. Pacific Command, Camp H. M. Smith, Hawaii.

== Awards and decorations ==
- Master Parachutist Badge
- Air Assault Badge
- Parachute Rigger Badge
- Legion of Merit with oak leaf cluster
- Bronze Star Medal with oak leaf cluster
- Defense Meritorious Service Medal
- Meritorious Service Medal with six oak leaf clusters
- Army Commendation Medal with oak leaf cluster
- Army Achievement Medal with two oak leaf clusters
- National Defense Service Medal with bronze service star
- Iraq Campaign Medal with three campaign stars
- Global War on Terrorism Service Medal
- Army Service Ribbon
- Army Overseas Service Ribbon fourth award
- Korea Defense Service Medal
- NATO Medal

Military offices
Preceded by Brigadier General Gwen Bingham	Quartermaster General of the United States Army; 2013–2014	Succeeded by Brigadier General Ronald Kirklin
