= Edmund Gregory (author) =

English author

Edmund Gregory (born c.1616), was an English author.

Gregory was born about 1615, the son of Henry Gregory, rector of, and benefactor to, Sherrington, Wiltshire. He entered Trinity College, Oxford, in 1632, and proceeded B.A. on 5 May 1636. He wrote: An Historical Anatomy of Christian Melancholy, sympathetically set forth, in a threefold state of the soul. With a concluding Meditation on the Fourth Verse of the Ninth Chapter of St. John, London, 1646. To this work is prefixed a portrait of the author in his thirty-first year, engraved by W. Marshall. As he is not depicted in the habit of a clergyman of the church of England, Wood is probably wrong in his conjecture that he was episcopally ordained.

He is not the Edmund Gregory, resident of Cuxham, Oxfordshire, and described as an "esquire", and who died at Walton-on-Thames, Surrey, in 1691; who was a graduate of Merton College, Oxford.
