= U.S. Army Quartermaster Museum =

Military museum in Fort Gregg-Adams, Virginia

United States Army Quartermaster Museum
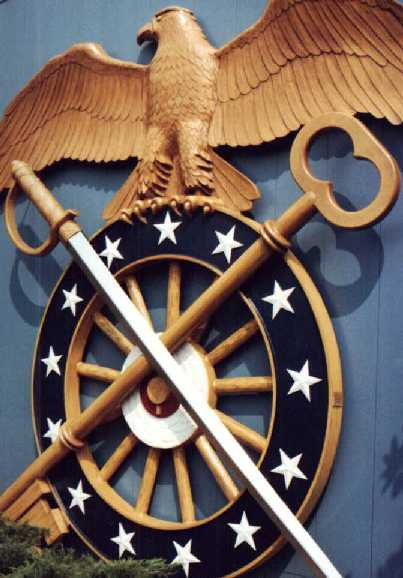
- Quartermaster Branch insignia on the side of the museum
- Established: 1957
- Location: 1201 22nd Street, Bldg. 5218 Fort Lee, Virginia
- Coordinates: 37°14′31″N 77°20′47″W
- Collections: Insignia and flags; Clothing; Equipment and personal items; Weapons; Artwork; Vehicles
- Visitors: 70,000
- Director: Weldon Svoboda
- Website: United States Army Quartermaster Museum

The United States Army Quartermaster Museum, located at Fort Lee, Virginia, is an AAM accredited museum in the Commonwealth of Virginia. The museum's aim is to preserve and exhibit the history of the Quartermaster Corps, which was formed in 1775. Its collection comprises more than 24,000 items. The museum also serves the Quartermaster Center and School as a classroom for the teaching of history, educating more than 16,000 soldiers, non-commissioned officers, warrant officers, and officers a year.

== Museum history ==
The museum's beginnings can be traced back to 1953 when the Quartermaster School at Fort Lee, Virginia organized a collection of reproduction period uniforms for use in the school's courses of instruction on uniform fitting and sizing. In 1954 two World War II vintage buildings were opened to house the uniforms. This popular classroom exhibit was often referred to as the "museum".

The museum was officially established in February 1957, with these uniforms and donations of quartermaster related items forming the core of the collection. Several artifacts came from the major former Quartermaster Depots at Philadelphia; Jeffersonville, Indiana; and the Quartermaster Remount Depot at Front Royal, Virginia.

The 20,000 square foot main museum building was completed in June 1963. Construction was funded by private contributions and loans to the Quartermaster Memorial Corporation (now the Army Quartermaster Foundation, Inc.). After completion the building was donated to the U.S. Government.

The museum building was dedicated in 1976 to honor of Brigadier General John A. Spencer Jr. General Spencer was instrumental in the establishment of the museum. Fund raising efforts by the Army Quartermaster Foundation, Inc., have resulted in several expansions of the original museum building.

In October 1993, the museum added a 100-seat multipurpose auditorium dedicated to Major General Robert M. Littlejohn. Littlejohn was the World War II Quartermaster for the European Theater of Operations and tireless supporter of the museum.

In June 1998 a research and learning center was completed and dedicated to Major General Joseph E. Peklik, the driving force behind fund raising for this expansion effort. The addition houses the museum curator, library, archival storage, conservation laboratory and collection study area.

The most noticeable feature of the exterior of the museum building is the large iconic three-dimensional representation of the Quartermaster branch insignia. Constructed by Lakeshore Markers of Erie, Pennsylvania, it is often used as the background for group photos by visitors and various organizations on Fort Lee.

== Significant artifacts ==
The Quartermaster Museum has several unique, "National Treasures" in its collection. They include:

- General Patton's World War II jeep. The Jeep was assigned to George S. Patton throughout the European Campaign of World War II. Modified to reflect General Patton's unique personality it has among other things, Buell trombone air-horns mounted on hood to announce his arrival.
- General Grant's Civil War saddle. The Grimsley saddle was used by General Grant from the July 1862 to the surrender of Confederate forces at Appomattox Court House in April 1865. The saddle was presented by Grant in 1869 to a former member of his military staff, Colonel A.H. Markland. Markland loaned the saddle to the Smithsonian Institution 1887 where it stayed for more than 70 years. It came to the Quartermaster Museum in 1968. "…perhaps one of the most prized objects in the Army Museum System." General Gordon R. Sullivan, former Chief of Staff of the Army
- General Grant's Civil War wagon. On display is an 1861 Army "Rucker" pattern ambulance that is thought to be used by Grant to transport his baggage during the Petersburg Campaign in the Civil War. After the war it was stored at the Old Soldier's Home and later at the Richmond Quartermaster Depot.
- President Franklin Pierce's saddle. The silver mounted saddle dates from Pierce's military service as a brigade commander in the Mexico-American War in the late 1840s.
- General Eisenhower's office van was used by General Dwight D. Eisenhower during World War II when he served as the Supreme Allied Commander for the European theater of war. The vehicle used as his mobile living quarters and field office is a converted 25 foot, 6 ton semi-trailer. The interior is finished in natural wood paneling and includes a bunk, wardrobe, ice chest as well as shower, sink, and toilet facilities.
- The first 50 star flag signifies Hawaiian statehood and was presented to President Eisenhower in 1960.
- Presidential Flags which were used by Taft, Wilson, Harding, Truman, Eisenhower, and Theodore & Franklin Roosevelt are on display. It is one of the largest collection of presidential flags.

== See also ==
- Military supply
- Quartermaster
- Quartermaster Center and School
- Quartermaster Corps (United States Army)
- Quartermaster general
