= Rodney D. Fogg =

Major General of the United States Army

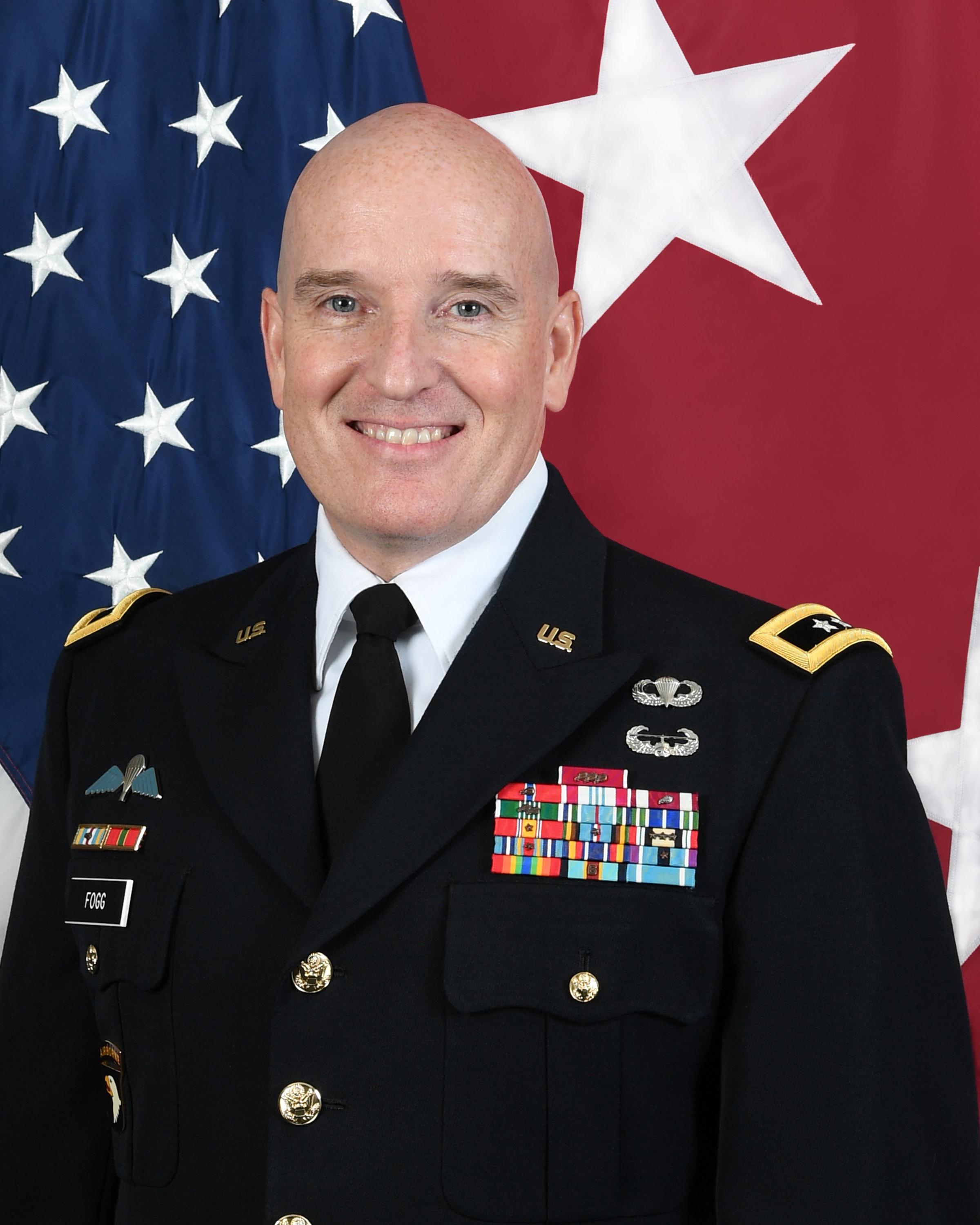
- Official portrait, 2018
- Education: King University
- Military career
- Allegiance: United States
- Branch: United States Army
- Service years: 1987–2022
- Rank: Major General
- Commands: United States Army Combined Arms Support Command; Fort Lee; United States Army Quartermaster School; 13th Sustainment Command (Expeditionary); 49th Quartermaster Group; 17th Combat Sustainment Support Battalion
- Conflicts: Operation Uphold Democracy; Iraq War; Yemen
- Awards: Army Distinguished Service Medal; Legion of Merit (4); Bronze Star Medal (2)

Rodney D. Fogg is a retired United States Army major general who served as the Deputy Chief of Staff for Logistics and Operations of the United States Army Materiel Command from August 2021 until December 2022. Fogg also served as the Commanding General of the United States Army Combined Arms Support Command and Sustainment Center of Excellence at Fort Lee, Virginia from September 2018 to July 2021.

== Education ==
Fogg is a native of Castlewood, Virginia. He received his bachelor's degree from King College in Bristol, Tennessee, and was commissioned a second lieutenant in the Quartermaster Corps from East Tennessee State University in 1987. He is a graduate of the Quartermaster Officer Basic and Advanced Courses, Command and General Staff College and the United States Army War College, holding master's degrees in Logistics Management and Strategic Studies.

== Military career ==
Fogg's first assignment was as Platoon Leader and Battalion S-1 in the 19th Maintenance Battalion in Giessen, West Germany. He was the battalion S-4 and Company Commander of the 102nd Quartermaster Company (POL), 561st Corps Support Battalion in Fort Campbell, Kentucky. During this assignment he deployed to Operation Provide Hope in Somalia and Operation Uphold Democracy in Haiti. Fogg later served as the Logistics Officer for the 3rd Battalion, 160th Special Operations Aviation Regiment (Airborne), at Hunter Army Airfield, Savannah, Georgia.

Fogg served as the Materiel Readiness Officer, 101st Airborne Division Support Command, then Support Operations and Executive Officer, 526th Forward Support Battalion at Fort Campbell, Kentucky, deploying to Operation Iraqi Freedom in 2003. He was an International Logistics Officer, Executive Assistant, and Chief, Logistics Plans at Headquarters, United States Pacific Command in Camp Smith, Hawaii. His battalion command was of the 17th Combat Sustainment Support Battalion at Fort Richardson, Alaska, where he deployed for 15 months in support of Operation Iraqi Freedom (2007–09), and then served as Deputy G-4, United States Army Alaska. Fogg served as the Chief, Company Grade Logistics Branch, Army Human Resources Command in Alexandria, Virginia. He commanded the 49th Quartermaster Group (POL), and then served as the Deputy Chief of Staff for Training and Doctrine (G-3), Combined Arms Support Command (CASCOM) at Fort Lee, Virginia. Later, he served as the Executive Officer to the Commanding General, United States Army Materiel Command in Redstone Arsenal, Alabama.

Fogg's last two assignments were Commanding General of the United States Army Combined Arms Support Command and Sustainment Center of Excellence at Fort Lee, Virginia from September 2018 to July 2021 and the Deputy Chief of Staff for Logistics and Operations, United States Army Materiel Command, Redstone Arsenal, Alabama. His retirement ceremony was held on August 19, 2022 and was officiated by Lieutenant General Flem Walker, who was himself due to retire in September.

Fogg became a Distinguished Member of the Quartermaster Regiment in 2014.

Military offices
Preceded by Ronald Kirklin	Quartermaster General of the United States Army; 2016–2018	Succeeded by Douglas M. McBride Jr.
Preceded by Daniel G. Mitchell	Deputy Chief of Staff for Logistics and Operations of the United States Army Materiel Command; 2018	Succeeded by Christopher O. Mohan
Preceded by Douglas M. McBride Jr. Acting	Commanding General of the United States Army Combined Arms Support Command; 2018–2021	Succeeded by Mark T. Simerly
Preceded by Charles R. Hamilton	Deputy Chief of Staff for Logistics and Operations of the United States Army Materiel Command; 2021–2022	Succeeded by Ronald R. Ragin
