= George Gibson (Commissary General) =

United States Army general

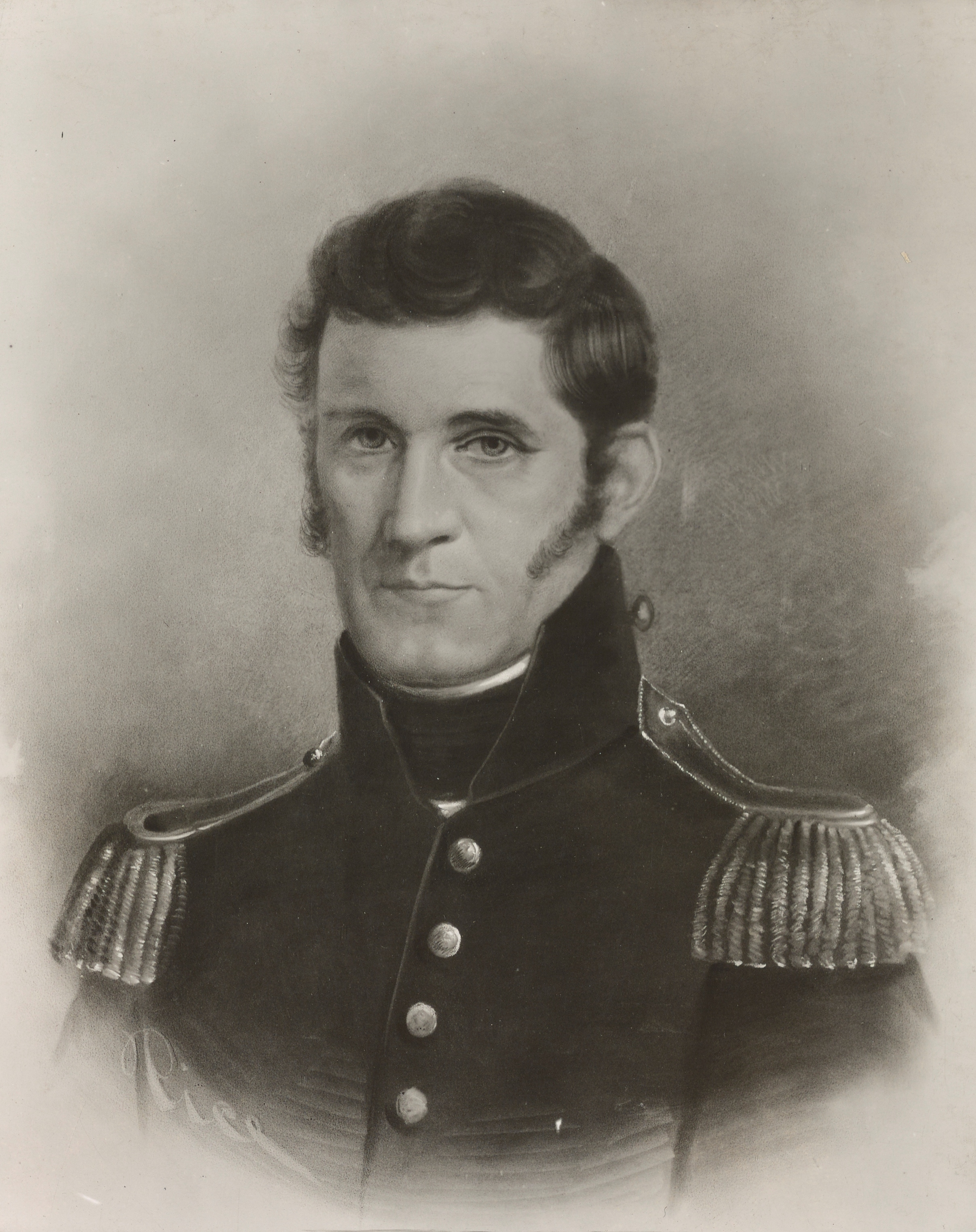
- Born: September 1, 1775; Westover, Pennsylvania
- Died: September 30, 1861 (aged 86); Washington, D.C.
- Burial place: Congressional Cemetery, Washington, D.C
- Relatives: John Bannister Gibson (brother)
- Military career
- Service years: 1808-1861
- Rank: Colonel; Brevet Major General
- Commands: Commissary General of Subsistence
- Conflicts: War of 1812; Battle of Queenston Heights; First Seminole War; Mexican-American War

George Gibson (1775–1861) was the United States Army's first Commissary General of Subsistence, holding the office from 1818 to 1861. He served as an infantry officer during the War of 1812, then briefly as Quartermaster General, before being appointed Commissary General. When he died he was the oldest serving officer in the army.

== Early life ==
Gibson was the son of Colonel George Gibson, commanding officer of the 1st Virginia State Regiment during the Revolutionary War, and later killed in action at the Battle of Wabash 1791 during the Northwest Indian War.

== Military career ==
When the army expanded in 1808, Gibson was commissioned captain from civilian life in the 5th Infantry. He was promoted to major in the 7th Infantry in 1811. During the War of 1812, Gibson was taken prisoner of war at the battle of Queenston Heights in 1812. Later exchanged, he was in 1813 promoted to lieutenant colonel in the 5th Infantry. After the end of the war, the large reduction in army size led to his honorable discharge from his regiment. Gibson was, however, in 1816 appointed one of two Quartermaster Generals with colonel's rank. He served in the First Seminole War under Andrew Jackson who commended him for his achievements. A reorganization of the Department of War created a distinct military organization in charge of army victualling, and in 1818 Gibson became the first Commissary General of Subsistence with colonel's rank; an office he held until the beginning of the Civil War. He died in 1861, 86 years old and the oldest serving officer in the army. Gibson was brevetted brigadier general in 1826, for ten years service in the same grade, and major general in 1848 for meritorious conduct during the Mexican War.

== Private life ==
Gibson was a close friend of General Winfield Scott, going back to the War of 1812, and of President Andrew Jackson going back to the First Seminole War. He never married; celebrating his bachelorhood as president of the Hope Club, a haunt for unmarried officers in Washington.

== Legacy ==
Fort Gibson, Indian Territory, was named after Gibson.
