= Richard Napoleon Batchelder =

US Army general and Medal of Honor recipient (1832–1901)

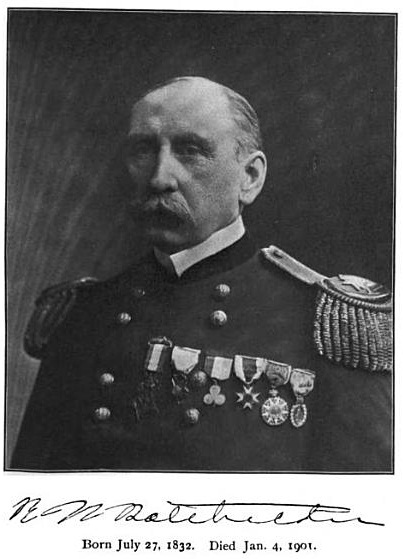
- Brig. Gen. Richard N. Batchelder, Quartermaster General of the United States Army
- Born: July 27, 1832; Laconia, New Hampshire, US
- Died: January 4, 1901 (aged 68); Washington, D.C., US
- Burial place: Arlington National Cemetery
- Military career
- Allegiance: {United States
- Branch: United States Army; Union Army
- Service years: 1861–1896
- Rank: Brigadier general
- Commands: 1st Regiment New Hampshire Volunteer Infantry; Quartermaster of the Army of the Potomac
- Conflicts: American Civil War; Battle of Ball's Bluff; Battle of Fair Oaks; Battle of Antietam; Battle of Chancellorsville; Battle of Gettysburg; Battle of Spotsylvania Court House; Battle of Cold Harbor; Siege of Petersburg; Battle of Appomattox Court House
- Awards: Medal of Honor

Richard Napoleon Batchelder (July 27, 1832 – January 4, 1901) was a United States Army Officer and the 18th Quartermaster General of the United States Army. Brigadier General Batchelder was awarded the Medal of Honor in 1891.

== Early life ==
Richard N. Batchelder was born to Nathan and Peace Batchelder on July 27, 1832, in Laconia, New Hampshire. His father was a state representative, and his mother was the daughter of a prominent pastor. Richard attended the county school system of Manchester. During early adulthood he endeavored in many ventures, one of which was business.

== Military career ==
At the start of the American Civil War he quit private enterprise and enlisted in the Union Army in May 1861. Upon joining the Army, he was commissioned as a first lieutenant, and took duty as regimental quartermaster for the 1st New Hampshire Volunteer Infantry. He was promoted to the rank of captain in August 1861, and became a Divisional Quartermaster in March 1862. He eventually promoted to lieutenant colonel and chief quartermaster of II Corps in January 1863.

During one of his missions in October 1863, the corps' supply units were bombarded by the enemy, and because of his leadership, his unit was able to successfully accomplish the mission without any loss of supplies. This feat would later earn him the Medal of Honor, and he was promoted to colonel with the title of Chief Quartermaster of the Army of the Potomac the next year. Batchelder was mustered out of the volunteer service on June 8, 1865, and was transferred to the Regular Army, reverting to the rank of captain.

On January 13, 1866, President Andrew Johnson nominated Batchelder for appointment to the rank of brevet brigadier general of Volunteers, to rank from March 13, 1865, and the U.S. Senate confirmed the appointment on March 12, 1866. On February 23, 1869, President Andrew Johnson nominated Batchelder for appointment to the grade of brevet brigadier general, U.S. Army (Regular Army), to rank from April 9, 1865, and the U.S. Senate confirmed the appointment on March 3, 1869.

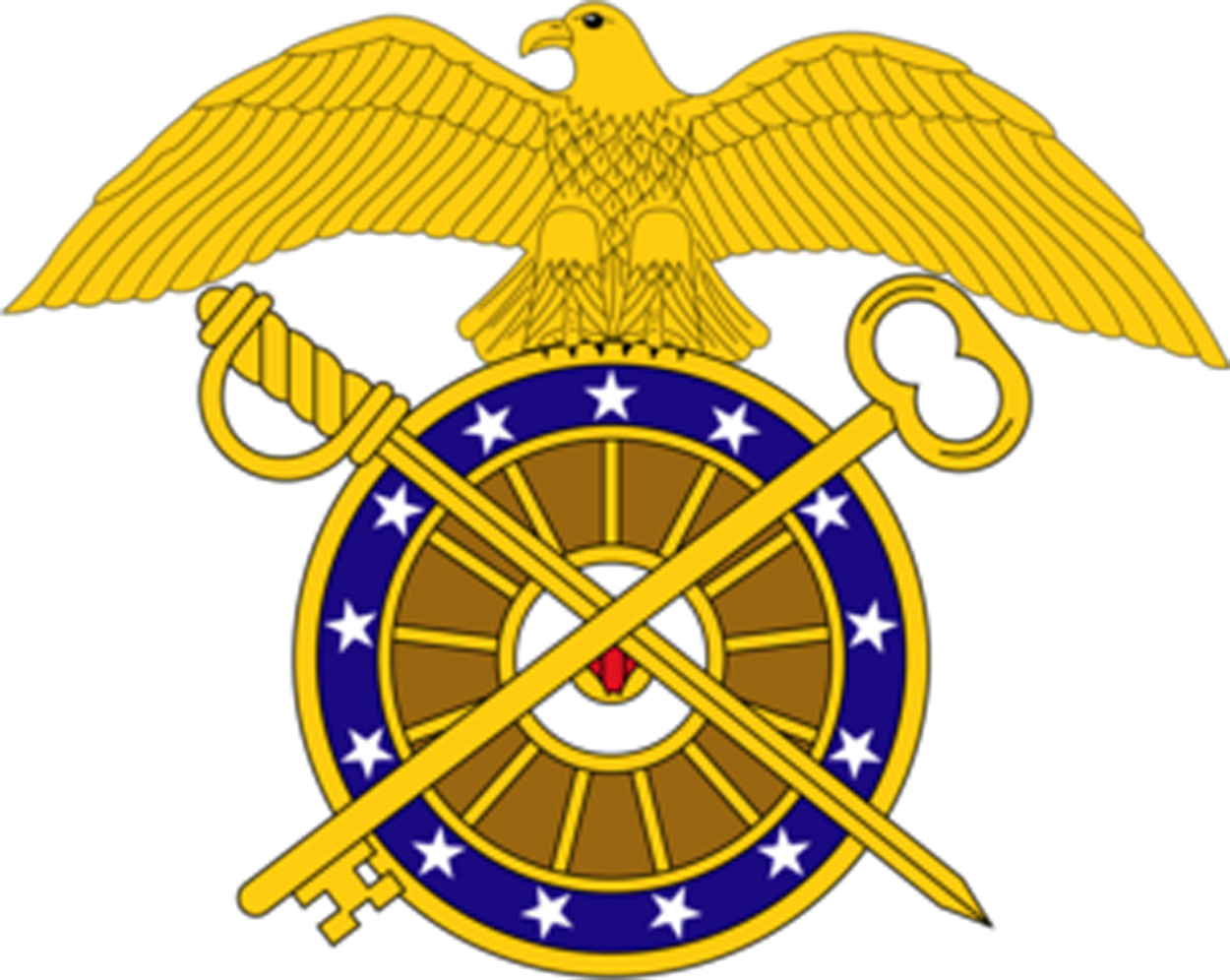

After the Civil War, Batchelder then served at various commands across the country under the quartermaster branch for 25 years before he was promoted to brigadier general on June 26, 1890. With this promotion he was appointed as the 18th Quartermaster General of the United States Army. As Quartermaster General of the Army he was also in charge of the creation of the emblem used to identify the Quartermaster Corps. He retired from the Army on July 27, 1896.

General Batchelder was a member of the Military Order of the Loyal Legion of the United States, the Sons of the Revolution and the Society of Colonial Wars.

== Medal of Honor Citation ==

Rank and Organization: Lieutenant Colonel and Chief Quartermaster, 2d Corps.
Place and Date: Between Catlett and Fairfax Stations, Virginia, 13–15 October 1863.
Entered Service At: Manchester, New Hampshire.
Born: 27 July 1832, Meredith, New Hampshire.
Date of Issue: 20 May 1895.

"The President of the United States in the name of The Congress takes pleasure in presenting the MEDAL OF HONOR to LIEUTENANT COLONEL & CHIEF QUARTERMASTER RICHARD NAPOLEON BATCHELDER UNITED STATES ARMY For service as set forth in the following CITATION:

Being ordered to move his trains by a continuous day-and-night march, and without the usual military escort, armed his teamsters and personally commanded them, successfully fighting against heavy odds and bringing his trains through without the loss of a wagon.

== Dates of rank ==
Rank	Date	Unit	Component
First lieutenant	May 2, 1861	1st New Hampshire Infantry	U.S. Volunteers
Captain	August 1861	Assistant Quartermaster of Volunteers	Volunteers
Lieutenant colonel	January 1863	Chief Quartermaster 2d Corps, Army of the Potomac	Volunteers
Colonel	August 1864	Quartermaster of the Army of the Potomac	Volunteers
Captain	June 1865	Assistant Quartermaster	Regular Army
Major	January 18, 1867	Chief Quartermaster	Regular Army
Lieutenant colonel	March 10, 1882	Deputy Quartermaster-General	Regular Army
Brigadier general	June 26, 1890	Quartermaster General	Regular Army

== Later life ==
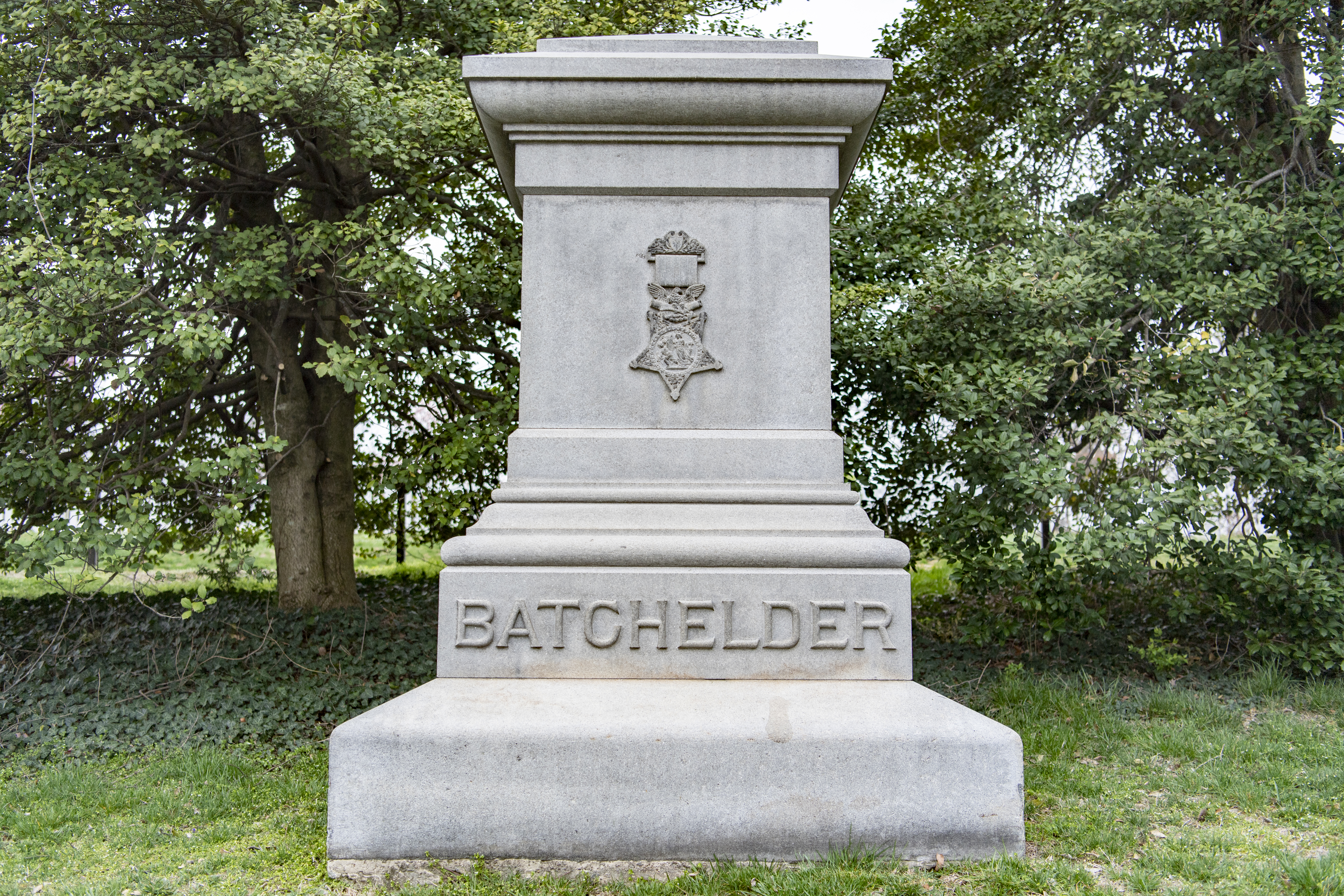
Grave at Arlington National Cemetery

Richard N. Batchelder retired from the U.S. Army on July 27, 1896. He died in Washington, D.C., on January 4, 1901, and was buried at Arlington National Cemetery, in Arlington, Virginia.
