= John Cusick =

United States Army general (born 1942)

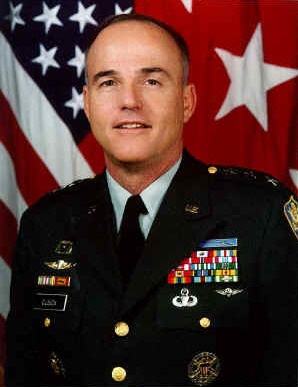
- Born: March 11, 1942 (age 84); Scranton, Pennsylvania, U.S.
- Military career
- Allegiance: United States of America
- Branch: United States Army
- Service years: 1964–1998
- Rank: Lieutenant General
- Unit: Quartermaster Corps
- Conflicts: Vietnam War

Lt. General John Joseph Cusick (born March 11, 1942) is a retired lieutenant general of the United States Army. Cusick served as the 42nd Quartermaster General of the United States Army from July 1991 until August 1993.

Cusick began his military career in May 1964, when he was commissioned as a second lieutenant from the Army ROTC at the University of Scranton. He received a bachelor's degree in American history from the University of Scranton. He also obtained a master's degree in American history from the University of Nebraska–Lincoln and a master's in management from Webster University in Missouri. He retired honorably from the U.S. Army on May 31, 1998.
