= Edmund B. Gregory =

United States Army general

Edmund Bristol Gregory
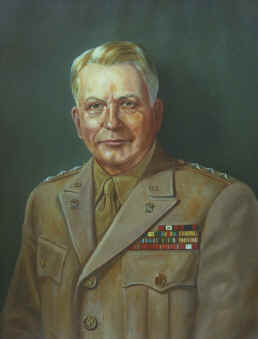
- Lieutenant General Edmund Bristol Gregory; 31st Quartermaster General of the United States Army
- Born: July 4, 1882; Storm Lake, Iowa
- Died: January 26, 1961 (aged 78); Walter Reed Army Medical Center
- Burial place: Arlington National Cemetery
- Military career
- Allegiance: United States of America
- Branch: United States Army
- Service years: 1904–1946
- Rank: Lieutenant General
- Commands: Quartermaster Corps
- Conflicts: World War I World War II
- Awards: Distinguished Service Medal

Edmund Bristol Gregory (July 4, 1882 – January 26, 1961) was a Lieutenant General in the United States Army who served as Quartermaster General during World War II.

== Early life and education ==
Gregory was born at Storm Lake, Iowa, on July 4, 1882.

He graduated from the United States Military Academy at West Point in 1904, and was commissioned a second lieutenant in the Infantry.

== Military career ==
Gregory served with the 14th Infantry Regiment in the Philippines from 1904 to 1905. From 1905 to 1908 he was assigned to Vancouver Barracks in Washington.

He was again assigned to duty in the Philippines, serving from 1908 to 1910, when he was transferred to Fort William Henry Harrison, Montana, where he remained until 1911.

From 1911 to 1912 he was professor of history and English at West Point. He then went to the Philippines for the third time, serving there until 1916.

Gregory served at the General Supply Depot in Jeffersonville, Indiana, from 1917 to 1921 and transferred from the Infantry to Quartermaster in 1920. From 1921 to 1922 he was assistant supply officer at Atlanta, Georgia's General Intermediate Depot.

He served in Shanghai, China, from 1922 to 1924 and was an advisor to the New York National Guard from 1924 to 1927. Gregory was then assigned to the Office of the Quartermaster General in Washington, D.C., where he served from 1928 to 1933, and he received a master's of business administration degree from Harvard University in 1929.

From 1933 to 1936 Gregory was assigned to Headquarters, II Corps and he graduated from the Army War College in 1937.

Gregory served again in the Office of Quartermaster General beginning in 1937, and in 1940 he was appointed as the Army's Quartermaster General, advancing from Colonel directly to Major General. In 1945 he was promoted to Lieutenant General, the first Quartermaster Officer to attain this rank. As Quartermaster General during World War II, he oversaw the development, procurement and distribution of billions of dollars' worth of equipment and supplies. Gregory also supervised the training of thousands of quartermaster soldiers. In addition, he had responsibility for over 900,000 civilian personnel employed by contractors to produce supplies, equipment, ammunition and vehicles for the war effort.

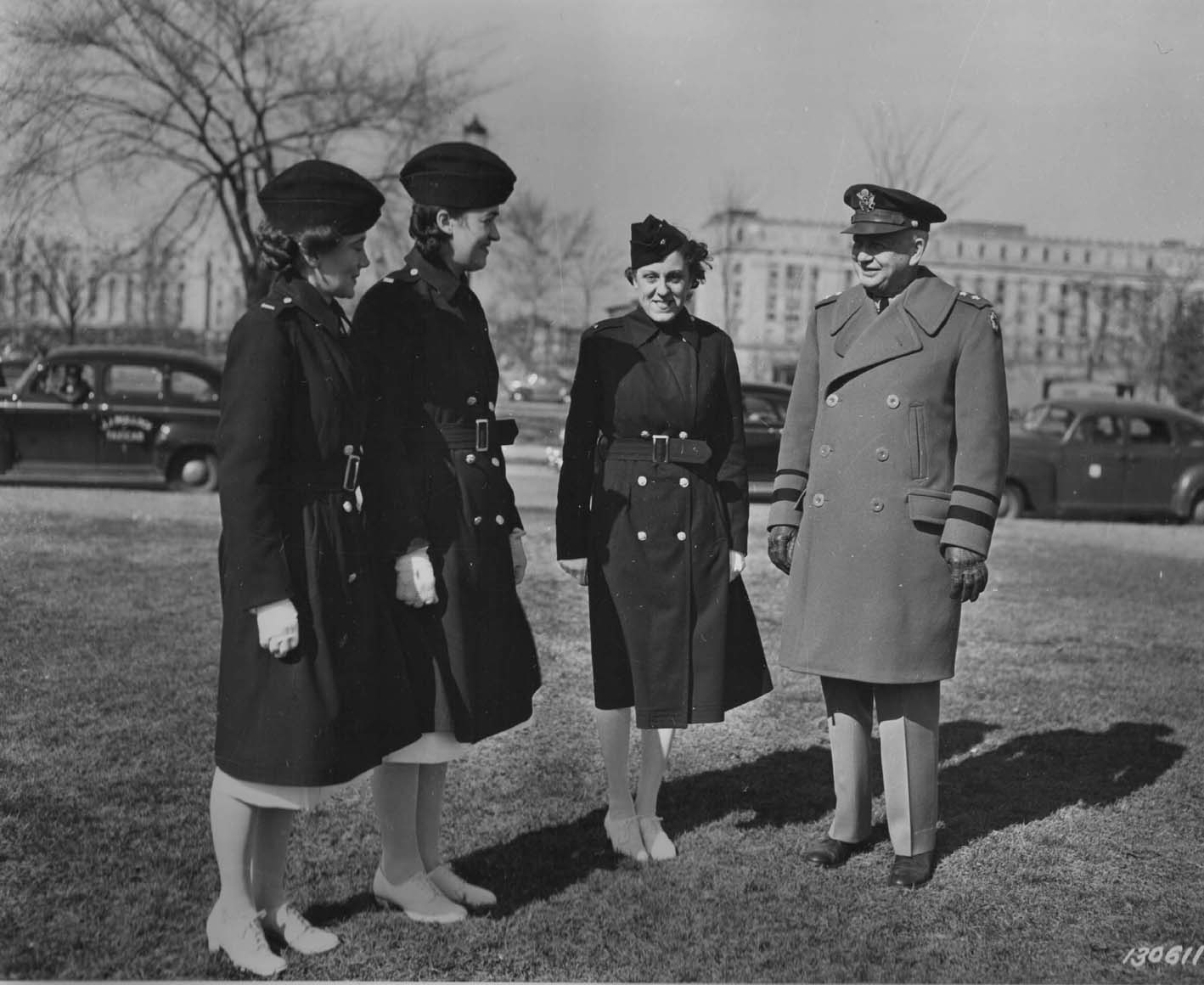
Quartermaster General Maj Gen Gregory discusses Army nurses' clothing with Lt. Alice Montgomery, Lt. Josephine Etz, and Lt. Leophile Bouchard, of Walter Reed Hospital. The Quartermaster General is responsible for supplying all branches of the Army.

After the war he was assigned as Chairman of the War Assets Corporation, responsible for disposing of the surplus of wartime bases, supplies and equipment, where he served until his 1946 retirement.

== Death and legacy ==
General Gregory died at Walter Reed Army Hospital in Washington, D.C., on January 26, 1961, and was buried in Section 2, Lot E 134–2 at Arlington National Cemetery.

His commendations and decorations included two awards of the Distinguished Service Medal, Philippine Campaign Medal, Mexican Border Service Medal, World War I Victory Medal, American Defense Service Medal, American Campaign Medal, European-African-Middle Eastern Campaign Medal, Asiatic-Pacific Campaign Medal, World War II Victory Medal .

General Gregory was one of the first inductees of the Quartermaster Hall of Fame during the hall's 1986 charter year.

== Sources ==
- Biographical Register of the Officers and Graduates of the U.S. Military Academy, George W. Cullum, 1910, page 873
- Army List and Directory, published by the U.S. Army Adjutant General's Office, 1919, page 102
- History of the Fourteenth United States Infantry, from January, 1890 to December, 1908, Lewis Stone Sorley, 1909, page 133
- Newspaper article, Gen. Gibbins Retires March 31: Colonel Edmund B. Gregory, at Present Acting Quartermaster General, Will Succeed Him and be Promoted to the Grade of Major General, New York Times, March 13, 1940
- Newspaper article, The Toughest Job in the Army, Los Angeles Times, October 6, 1940
- Newspaper article, General E.B. Gregory War Assets Corp. Head, Associated Press, published in Hartford Courant, December 23, 1945
- Magazine article, War Wonder For You, Popular Mechanics, February 1945, volume 83, number 2, page 65
- Proceedings of the Conference on Quartermaster Textile Research, published by Inter-society Council for Textile Research, Textile Research Institute, 1946,
- Newspaper article, GI Surplus Priority Bill Signed: Will Help Country, Truman Says, New York Times, May 4, 1946
- Newspaper article, WAA Chief Resigns: Gen. Gregory Will Be Succeeded by Gen. Robert Littlejohn, New York Times, June 30, 1946
- Facts on File Yearbook, 1950, Volume 3, Page 277
- Newspaper article, Gen. Gregory Dead, War Supplies Chief, Is Dead, Chicago Tribune, January 28, 1961
- Newspaper article, Edmund B. Gregory Dies at 78: Wartime Quartermaster General, New York Times, January 28, 1961
- U.S. Army Quartermaster Foundation web site, Quartermaster Hall of Fame page (cached version), http://www.wikiwak.com/texis/wcolz/viewcache.html?q=edmund+gregory&h=258e64bc2d087b52481d44d032e76d5d
- Generals of World War II
