= United States Army Combined Arms Support Command =

U.S. Army command for providing Training and Leader Development

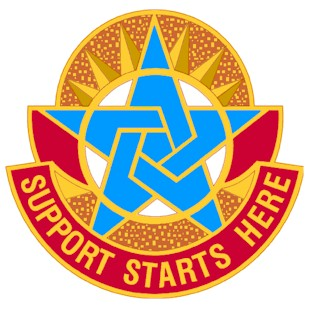
- Distinctive Unit Insignia
- Active: 2 October 1990 – present
- Country: United States
- Branch: United States Army
- Type: Major Subordinate Command
- Role: Training and Leader Development
- Size: Command
- Part of: United States Army Combined Arms Command
- Garrison/HQ: Fort Lee
- Website: Official Website

Commanders
- Current commander: MG Sean P. Davis

The U.S. Army Combined Arms Support Command (CASCOM) is a major subordinate command of the U.S. Army Transformation and Training Command (T2COM) and is located at Fort Lee, Virginia. Subordinate to CASCOM is the Sustainment Center of Excellence (SCoE), which oversees and coordinates the five sustainment branches of the Army (Adjutant General Corps, Finance Corps, Ordnance Corps, Quartermaster Corps, Transportation Corps) and the Army Sustainment University. The commander of CASCOM is dual-hatted as the head of SCoE. The CASCOM commander also serves as the commander of Fort Lee.

== Mission ==
CASCOM provides Training and Leader Development, and develops concepts, doctrine, organizations, lifelong learning, and materiel solutions, to provide sustainment in support of a campaign quality Army with joint and expeditionary capabilities.

CASCOM is responsible for training more than 180,000 students annually through 541 courses taught by the Ordnance, Quartermaster and Transportation schools, Soldier Support Institute and Army Sustainment University.

The establishment of the Sustainment Center of Excellence under CASCOM does not eliminate the duties and responsibilities of CASCOM Headquarters. CASCOM is a major subordinate element of the Training and Doctrine Command which trains and educates Soldiers and Civilians, develop and integrates capabilities, concepts and doctrine, and executes functional proponency to enable the Army's Sustainment Warfighting Function.

== Subordinate commands ==
- U.S. Army Ordnance Corps and School
- U.S. Army Quartermaster Corps and School
- U.S. Army Transportation Corps and School
- U.S. Army Soldier Support Institute
  - United States Army Adjutant General School
  - United States Army Financial Management School
- U.S. Army Sustainment University

== History ==
=== Combat Service Support Group (CSSG) and Personnel and Logistics Support Group (PALSG) 1962-1973 ===
The U.S. Army Combined Arms Support Command (CASCOM) at Fort Lee, Virginia, had its origins in a 1950 Project VISTA study, which, among other recommendations, proposed that the Army set up a separate and independent command to formulate and test new concepts. With the establishment of the Combat Developments Group (CDG) within the Headquarters of the Office of the Chief of Army Field Forces in 1952, the Army began to evaluate the effects of scientific developments on Army doctrine, and also began evaluating development requirements for new weapons. Ten years later, in 1962, the Army activated the 4-star U.S. Army Combat Development Command (CDC) at Fort Belvoir, Virginia with responsibilities for integrating the Army's research and development functions. Additionally, two subordinate organizations were created within the CDC; the Combat Service Support Group (CSSG) at Fort Lee, Virginia, and the Combined Arms Support Group at Fort Leavenworth, Kansas. For the first time, the Army began to integrate the development of tactics, doctrine, and organization with the materiel designed to support them; all part of the effort to functionalize the structure of the support services.

In further support of this reform, separate branch agencies were organized for each of the technical services (Quartermaster, Ordnance, Transportation, Adjutant General, Chaplain, Civil Affairs, Medical Service, and Military Police) and operated as tenants at bases where their respective schools were located. Each one had responsibility for combat development and doctrine for their respective branch. Additionally, within each branch school, separate departments of combat development and doctrinal expertise existed. The Judge Advocate General and Finance Schools were added in 1964, while Civil Affairs was transferred to the Combat Arms Group.

In a 1966 reorganization, the CSSG at Fort Lee assumed responsibility for developing all support elements for the Army in the field. Five CSSG directorates were combined into three: Personnel and Administration; Program and Budget; and Doctrine, Organization, Materiel and Evaluation. The Finance and Adjutant General agencies remained collocated at Fort Benjamin Harrison, IN, with their respective schools and they combined to form the Personnel and Administrative Services Agency, while the Quartermaster and Ordnance Agencies were re-designated the Supply and Maintenance Agencies, respectively. In 1969, the MP agency was transferred to the Combat Support Group. CSSG became the Personnel and Logistics Systems Group (PALSG) in 1971, with few essential changes.

=== The Logistics Center (LOGC) 1973-1990 ===
With the creation of the 4-star U.S. Army Training and Doctrine Command (TRADOC)—a new major Army command—in March 1973, the 4-star Combat Developments Command was disestablished and its subordinate organizations were reorganized. Within TRADOC, three lower level, 2-star major subordinate 'integrating centers' were created: the Logistics Center (which replaced the PALSG at Fort Lee), the Combined Arms Center at Fort Leavenworth, and the Administrative Center at Fort Benjamin Harrison, IN. Materiel development became a cooperative effort with TRADOC as primary combat developer and the Army Materiel Command (AMC) as the primary materiel developer.

The Logistics Center assumed responsibility for the development, testing, integration, and dissemination for logistics concepts, doctrine and systems, the design of management systems, the control of management characteristics as they affected logistical support, the organization of logistics units, the career development of logistics personnel, and the conduct of exercises and command post exercises. Training exercises, such as the Logistics Exercise (LOGEX) would continue to be a major activity at the LOGC over the next two decades. Additionally, in 1975, TRADOC instructed the Logistics Center to establish a mission capability in force restructuring, the importance of which has continued to the present.

In 1983, TRADOC designated the LOGC commander as the TRADOC Deputy Commanding General for Logistics, with the upgrading of the billet to a 3-star rank. With this increased authority, Lieutenant General Robert Bergquist set out to enhance the position of Combat Service Support with TRADOC by promoting the concept of multifunctionalism. This concept became a key part of the new doctrine developed by TRADOC, known as AirLand Battle, and multifunctionalism became an enduring concept of Army sustainment. LOGC began the process by creating Forward Support Battalions which ended the ad hoc practice of assigning forward area support coordinators (FASCOS) to brigade combat teams. The success of this initiative led to the subsequent redesign of logistics support commands and units at the division and echelons-above-division level.

In the early and mid-1980s, the technical service chiefs were 'brought back' in the interest of improved branch direction and 'esprit de corps' within each of the branches. With this re-establishment, each of the chiefs (ex. Quartermaster General, Chief of Ordnance, Chief of Transportation) became the commander of their respective schools and the lead proponent for their branch within the Army. Initially, subordinate to TRADOC, by the early-mid 1990s, these branch chiefs/school commandants would fall under the authority of LOGC and, subsequently, the Combined Arms Support Command.

=== Command Arms Support Command (CASCOM) 1990 – present ===
In 1990, the 'integration center' structure was terminated with the creation of two new subordinate 'umbrella' commands within TRADOC. The Logistics Center at Fort Lee and the Soldier Support Institute (a subordinate organization under the Soldier Support Center at Fort Benjamin Harrison) merged to form the new Combined Arms Support Command on 2 October 1990. The Combined Arms Command (CAC) at Fort Leavenworth replaced the Combined Arms Center. Subsequently. the Soldier Support Center was disestablished and the Soldier Support Institute was moved to Fort Jackson, South Carolina, following closure of Fort Benjamin Harrison due to the 1991 Base Realignment and Closure (BRAC) legislature.

Following Operation Desert Shield/Desert Storm in 1991, the relationship between CASCOM and the Army Materiel Command (AMC) became increasingly important as the Army strove to improve supply chain performance. Some CASCOM commanders went on to become commanders at AMC. In the early 1990s, multi-functional training for Army Captains was advanced by the creation of the Combined Logistics Officers Advanced Course (CLOAC) at the Army's Logistics Management College (ALMC) at Fort Lee, which included company command multifunctional leadership and staff training. The Logistics Captains Career Course at Army Sustainment University is the enduring evolution of this effort.

On 10 October 1994, CASCOM was reorganized. The combat developments, doctrinal concepts, proponency, evaluation and standardization, and training developments functions at the Quartermaster, Ordnance and Transportation branch schools were centralized at CASCOM headquarters. The branch schools were now focused on branch-specific instruction. In addition, CASCOM headquarters was realigned, with three deputy commanding generals (dual-hatted branch chiefs) with responsibility for Combat Developments, Training Development, and Automation.

Due to the 1998 BRAC decision, the Women's Army Corps Museum at Fort McClellan, Alabama closed and moved to its new location as the newly rebranded Army Women's Museum in a much expanded facility in May 2001. The director of this new museum was the Army's first female branch museum director. It joined the Quartermaster Museum which has been operating at Fort Lee since 1954.

By 2004, CASCOM's horizons had been expanded to include Joint, Interagency, and Multifunctional (JIM) concepts. The scope of the Functional Area (FA) 90 (multifunctional logistician) program was expanded and strengthened. The FA90 field will continue to grow and, in 2009, became the Logistics Branch.

The 2005 BRAC legislation brought significant change to CASCOM. A key part of BRAC was the consolidation of sustainment training at Fort Lee. The Ordnance Mechanical Maintenance School (OMMS) at Aberdeen Proving Ground, Maryland, and the Ordnance Munitions and Electronic Maintenance School (OMEMS) at Redstone Arsenal, Alabama, were relocated to Fort Lee, along with the movement of the Army Transportation School from Fort Eustis, Virginia to Fort Lee. The Soldier Support Institute, with the Finance School and Adjutant General School, remained at Fort Jackson, South Carolina. As part of this movement, the Ordnance Museum moved to Fort Lee and was reorganized as the Ordnance Training Support Facility (OD TSF).

Subsequent to BRAC, and the establishment of TRADOC's Center of Excellence model, the Sustainment Center of Excellence (SCoE) was established at CASCOM to oversee and coordinate the functions of the five sustainment branches: Ordnance, Quartermaster, Transportation, Finance, and Adjutant General. The CASCOM commander is dual-hatted as the commander of SCoE. As part of the creation of the SCoE, the Army Logistics Management College (ALMC) became the Army Logistics University (ALU) where professional development training takes place for logistics officers, warrant officers, non-commissioned officers, and civilians. 11 September 2011 signaled the end of the BRAC process.

In July 2021, the CASCOM commander, as the commander of Fort Lee, was tasked to support Operation Allies Refuge, with a goal of helping Afghan evacuees transition to a new life in the United States at the conclusion of the war in Afghanistan. Post leaders assembled a group called "Task Force Eagle," which spent the next four months supporting OAR. The Department of Defense, through U.S. Northern Command, and in support of the Department of State and Department of Homeland Security, provided transportation, temporary housing, medical screening and general support for Afghan evacuees at military facilities across the country.

The CASCOM commander, on 27 April 2023, redesignated Fort Lee as Fort Gregg-Adams after two African American officers Lt. Gen. Arthur J. Gregg and Lt. Col. Charity Adams. The name change was recommended by the Commission on the Naming of Items of the Department of Defense as part of the renaming of military assets which were associated with the Confederate States of America. The naming of Fort Lee is notable as it is the first time since 1900 where a fort has been named after a service member who is still alive.

== Commanders ==
	Name	Term began	Term ended
U.S. Army Combat Service Support Group (CSSG)
1.	Colonel Hubert D. Thomte	1 July 1962	31 March 1964
2.	Major General Kenneth G. Wickham	1 April 1964	31 July 1966^{1}
3.	Brigadier General Arthur L. Friedman	30 September 1966	25 July 1969^{2}
4.	Brigadier General Ross R. Condit	5 November 1969	April 1971
U.S. Army Personnel and Service Support Group (PALSG)
1.	Brigadier General Ross R. Condit Jr.	April 1971	19 December 1971
2.	Brigadier General John H. Boyes	3 January 1973	1 March 1973
U.S. Army Logistics Center (LOGC)
1.	Major General Erwin M. Graham Jr.	1 March 1973	28 July 1977
2.	Major General Homer D. Smith Jr.	28 July 1977	31 July 1979
3.	Major General Oren E. DeHaven	31 July 1979	25 June 1981
4.	Major General William K. Hunzeker	25 June 1981	4 April 1983
5.	Lieutenant General Robert L. Bergsquist	4 April 1983	9 January 1986
6.	Lieutenant General William G.T. Tuttle Jr.	10 January 1986	25 September 1989
7.	Lieutenant General Leon E. Salomon	25 September 1989	2 October 1990
U.S. Army Combined Arms Support Command (CASCOM)
1.	Lieutenant General Leon E. Salomon	2 October 1990	9 January 1992
2.	Lieutenant General Samuel N. Wakefield	9 January 1992	4 July 1994
3.	Major General Thomas W. Robison	6 July 1994	12 July 1996
4.	Major General Robert K. Guest	12 July 1996	14 August 1997
5.	Major General Daniel G. Brown	14 August 1997	15 September 1999
6.	Lieutenant General Billy K. Solomon	15 September 1999	16 August 2002
7.	Major General Terry E. Juskowiak	16 August 2002	2 September 2004
8.	Major General Ann E. Dunwoody	2 September 2004	26 October 2005
9.	Major General Mitchell H. Stevenson	26 October 2005	3 June 2008
10.	Major General James E. Chambers	3 June 2008	11 June, 20103
11.	Major General James L. Hodge	9 September 2010	26 June 2012
12.	Major General Larry D. Wyche	26 June 2012	22 August 2014
13.	Major General Stephen R. Lyons	22 August 2014	7 August 2015
14.	Major General Darrell K. Williams	7 August 2015	30 May 2017
15.	Major General Paul C. Hurley Jr.	30 May 2017	20 August, 20184
16.	Major General Rodney D. Fogg	17 September 2018	9 July 2021
17.	Major General Mark T. Simerly	9 July 2021	14 December 2023
18.	Major General Michelle K. Donahue	14 December 2023	14 November 2025
19.	Major General Sean P. Davis	14 November 2025	Current

1. Colonel Walter S. Schlotzhauer served as interim leader of CSSG from 1 August-29 September 1966 until BG Arthur L. Friedman assumed command on 30 September 1966.
2. Colonel Joseph E. Jenkins served as interim leader of CSSG from 26 July-4 November 1969 until BG Ross R. Condit Jr. assumed command on 5 November 1969
3. BG Jesse R. Cross, the Quartermaster General, was asked to wear two hats during the three-month gap between the departure of MG James E. Chambers and arrival of MG James L. Hodge.
4. BG Douglas M. McBride, the Quartermaster General, was asked to wear two hats during the one-month gap between the departure of MG Paul C. Hurley Jr. and arrival of MG Rodney Fogg.

== Supporting sustainment units ==
To provide a central location for Sustainment unit focused information on training, doctrine, lessons learned and force structure CASCOM has created the Sustainment Unit One Stop portal.

== Insignia ==
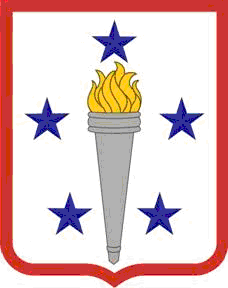
Combined Arms Support Command/Sustainment Center of Excellence

Shoulder Sleeve Insignia. Description: A shield-shaped embroidered item blazoned as follows: Argent, a torch of knowledge enflamed Or, the torch base Argent (Silver Gray), between five mullets Azure; all within a 1/8 inch (0.32 cm) red border. Overall dimensions are 2+3/8 inches (6.0 cm) in width by 3 inches (7.6 cm) in length.

- Symbolism: Red, white, and blue are the national colors. The torch of knowledge symbolizes the training functions of the center to transform service members into proficient logistic leaders and soldiers. Gold/yellow denotes excellence. The five stars represent the five major elements of sustainment – maintenance, supply, transportation, human resources, and financial services.
- Background: The shoulder sleeve insignia was approved effective 1 January 2009, and was worn starting on 1 October 2009.

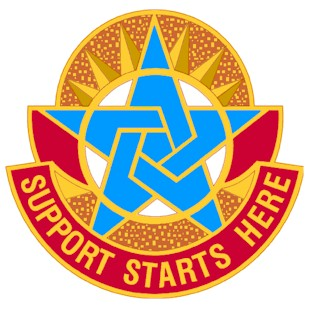
Combined Arms Support Command Distinctive Unit Insignia

Distinctive Unit Insignia. Description: A gold color metal and enamel device 1 1/8 inches (2.9 cm) high overall, on a white disc bordered by a gold ring, a stylized blue five-pointed star overlaid at the tips by the gold ring between, at top, a gold corona of six rays, and below a red scroll inscribed "SUPPORT STARTS HERE" in gold letters.

- Symbolism: The star represents new unit bringing together diverse elements, combining their functions and activities under one authority. It also represents the United States of America. The ring stands for unity and cooperation, the corona denotes achievement and future growth. Blue represents constancy and devotion; red stands for combat and courage. White stands for integrity and, with blue and red, represents the United States. Gold signifies excellence.
- Background: The distinctive unit insignia was approved 15 March 1991.

== Flag ==
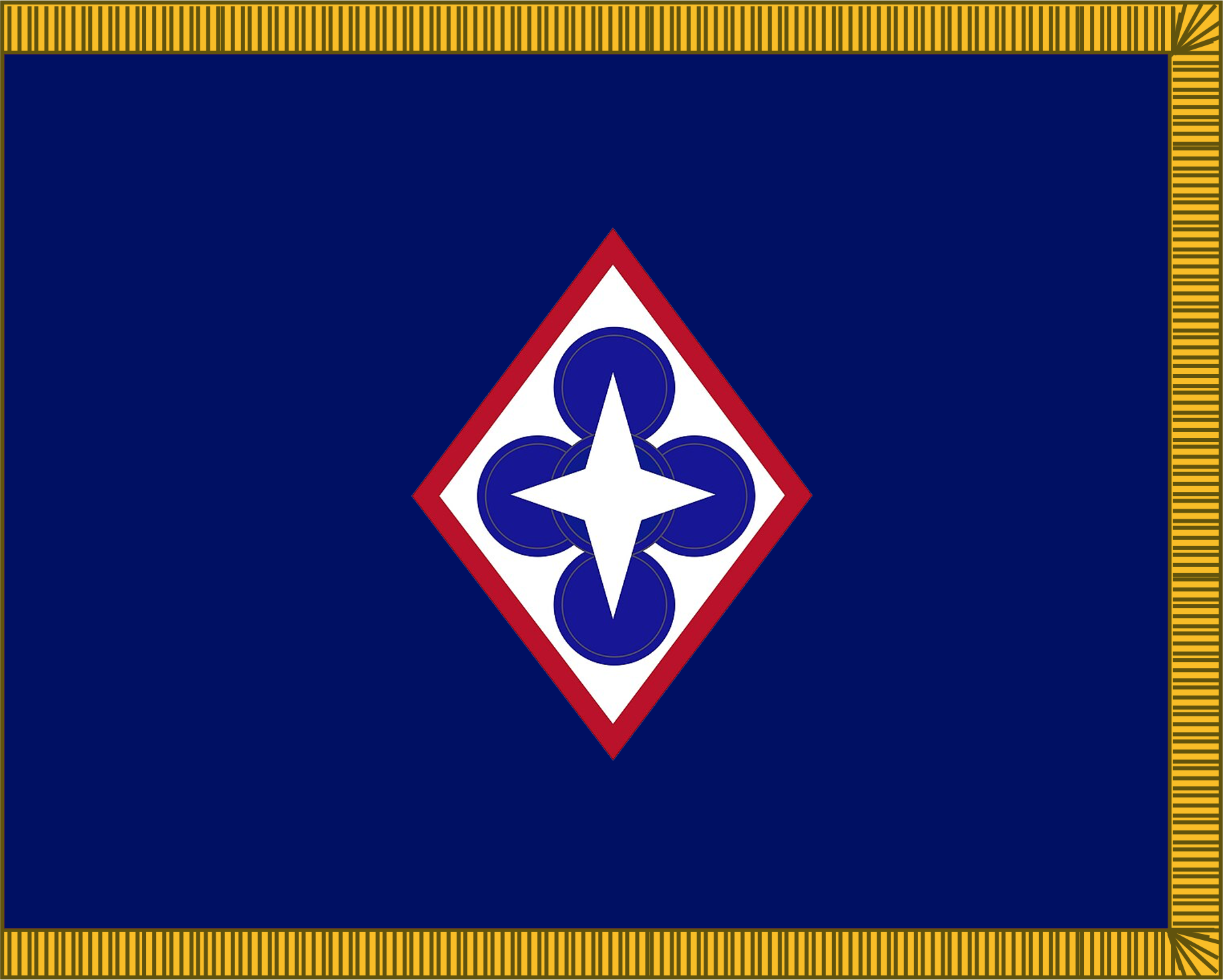
Combined Arms Support Command Flag

The flag for the Combined Arms Support Command and Fort Lee is National flag blue with yellow fringe. The shoulder sleeve insignia is centered on the flag (TIOH drawing 5–1–307).
