= United States Army Training and Doctrine Command =

Major command of the U.S. Army

Training and Doctrine Command
- Shoulder sleeve insignia
- Founded: 1 July 1973
- Disbanded: 2 October 2025
- Country: United States
- Branch: United States Army
- Type: Army command
- Role: Recruit and train
- Garrison/HQ: Fort Eustis
- Website: www.tradoc.army.mil at the Wayback Machine (September 2025) www.army.mil/tradoc at the Wayback Machine (October 2025)

Insignia
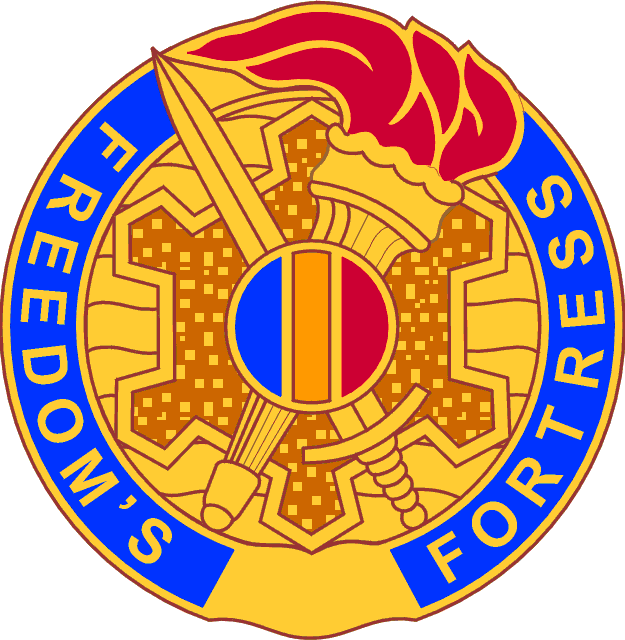
- Distinctive unit insignia

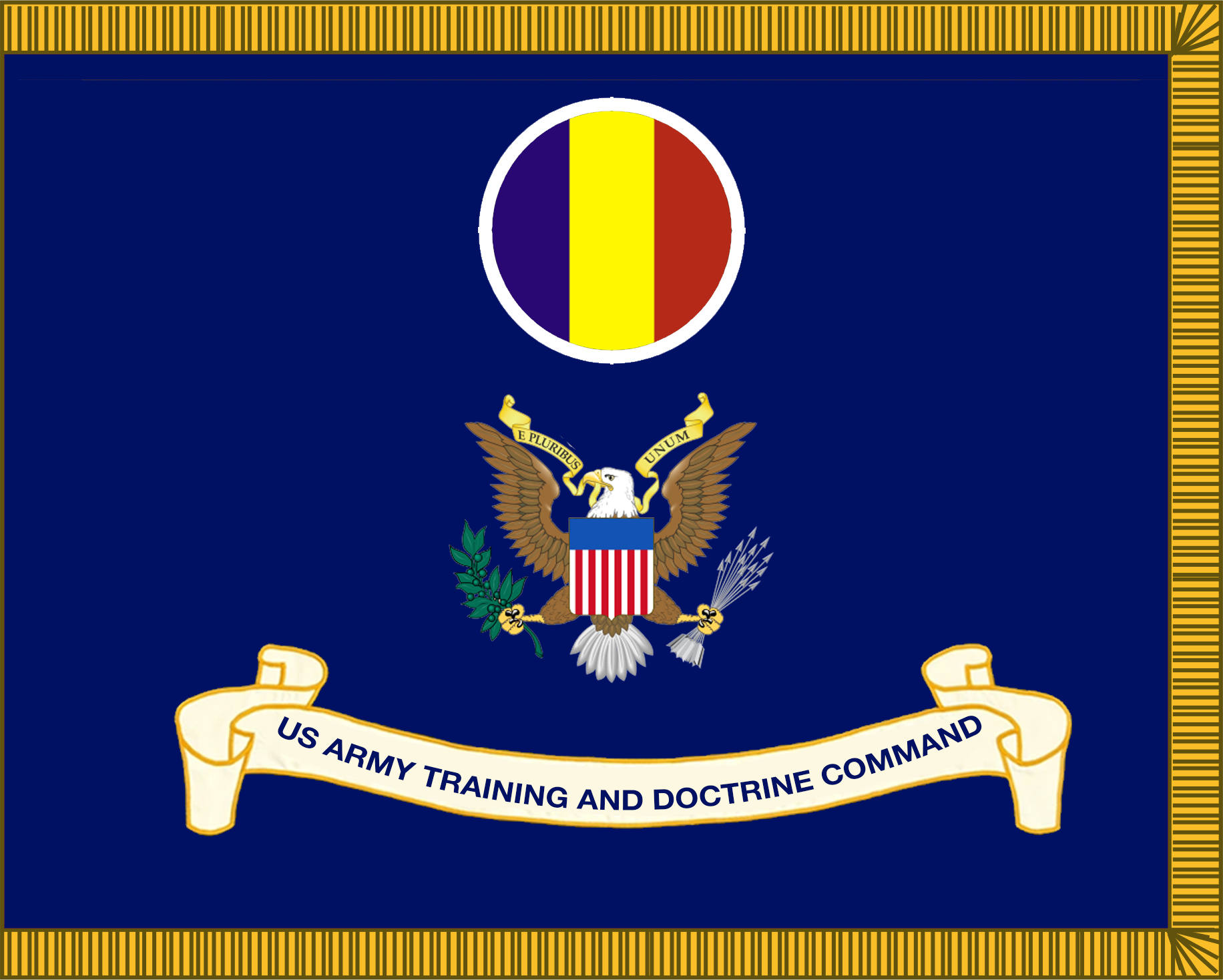
- US Army TRADOC Flag

The United States Army Training and Doctrine Command (TRADOC) was a major command of the United States Army headquartered at Fort Eustis, Virginia. It was active from 1973 to 2025. It was charged with overseeing training of Army forces and the development of operational doctrine. TRADOC operated 37 schools and centers at 27 different locations. TRADOC schools conducted 1,304 courses and 108 language courses. The 1,304 courses included 516,000 seats (resident, on-site and distributed learning) for 443,231 soldiers; 36,145 other-service personnel; 8,314 international soldiers; and 28,310 civilians. It was disestablished on September 26, 2025, and its functions transferred to the U.S. Army Transformation and Training Command (T2COM) in Austin, Texas, on October 2, 2025.

The last commanding general of TRADOC summarized its function as an organization to design, develop, and build the Army. Thus, four major commands of the Army (FORSCOM, AMC, AFC, and TRADOC) shape its present "men and materiel".

== Mission ==
The official mission statement for TRADOC stated:

Training and Doctrine Command develops, educates and trains Soldiers, civilians, and leaders; supports unit training; and designs, builds and integrates a versatile mix of capabilities, formations, and equipment to strengthen the U.S. Army as America's Force of Decisive Action.

== History ==
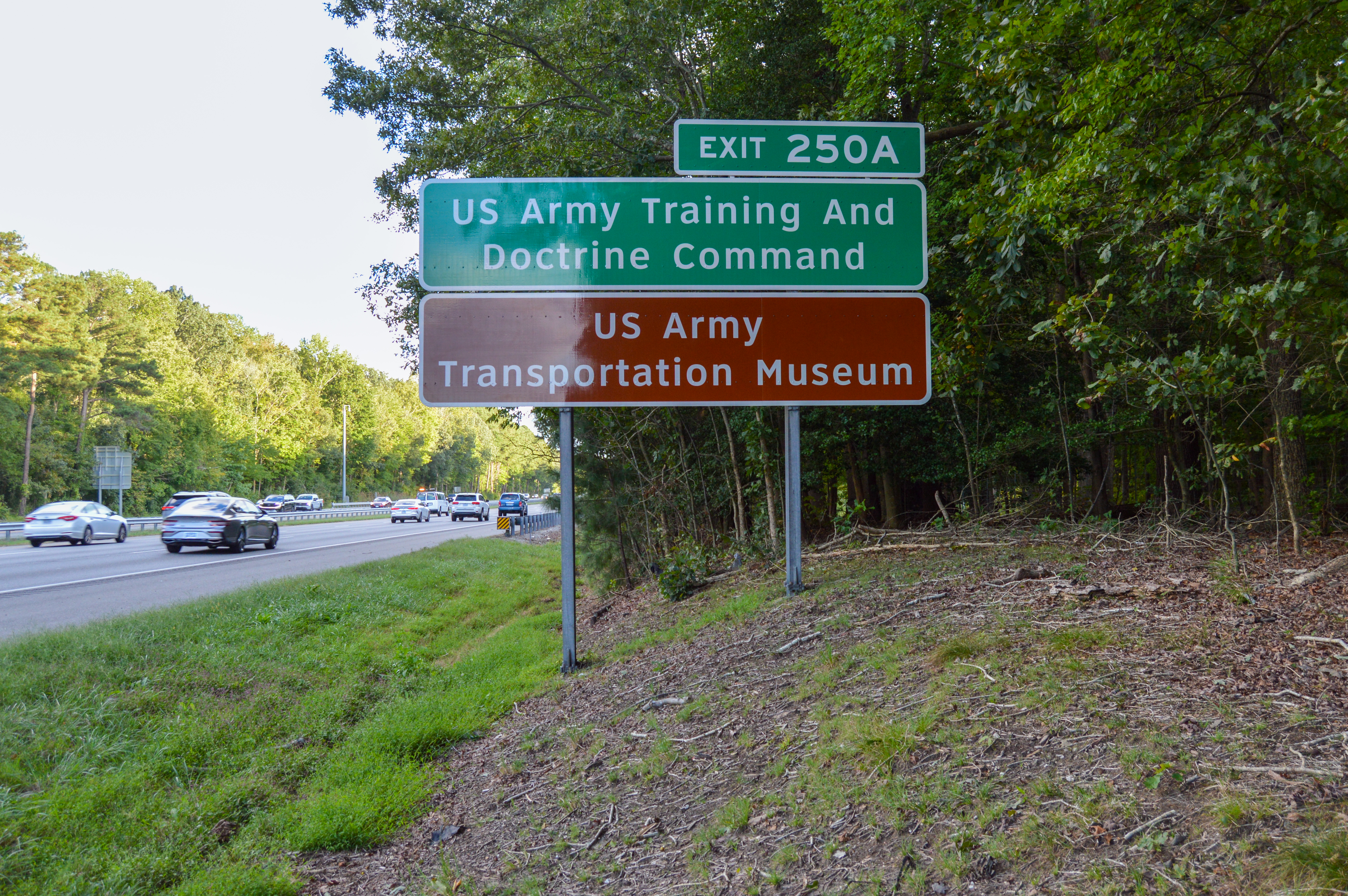
Road sign on Interstate 64 advertising the US Army Training and Doctrine Command and the U.S. Army Transportation Museum.

General Creighton Abrams, Chief of Staff of the US Army, identified that the Army needed to be reoriented and retrained to counter the conventional threat of the Soviets and ordered the establishment of Training and Doctrine Command. TRADOC was established as a major U.S. Army command on 1 July 1973; its first chief was William DePuy.

The new command, along with the United States Army Forces Command, was created from the Continental Army Command (CONARC) located at Fort Monroe, Virginia. That action was the major innovation in the Army's post-Vietnam reorganization, in the face of realization that CONARC's obligations and span of control were too broad for efficient focus. The new organization functionally realigned the major Army commands in the continental United States. CONARC, and Headquarters, U.S. Army Combat Developments Command (CDC), situated at Fort Belvoir, Virginia, were discontinued, with TRADOC and FORSCOM at Fort Belvoir assuming the realigned missions. TRADOC assumed the combat developments mission from CDC, took over the individual training mission formerly the responsibility of CONARC, and assumed command from CONARC of the major Army installations in the United States housing Army training center and Army branch schools.

Joined under TRADOC, the major Army missions of individual training and combat developments each had its own lineage. The individual training responsibility had belonged, during World War II, to Headquarters Army Ground Forces (AGF). In 1946, numbered army areas were established in the U.S. under AGF command. At that time, the AGF moved from Washington, D.C. to Fort Monroe. In March 1948, the AGF was replaced at Fort Monroe with the new Office, Chief of Army Field Forces (OCAFF). OCAFF, however, did not command the training establishment. That function was exercised by Headquarters, Department of the Army through the numbered armies to the corps, division, and Army Training Centers.

In February 1955, HQ Continental Army Command (CONARC) replaced OCAFF, assuming its missions as well as the training missions from DA (the Department of Army). In January, HQ CONARC was redesignated U.S. Continental Army Command.

Combat developments emerged as a formal Army mission in the early 1950s, and OCAFF assumed that role in 1952. In 1955, CONARC assumed the mission. In 1962, the Army Combat Development Command (CDC) was established to bring combat development functions under one roof.

In May 2025, the Army announced it would combine the Training and Doctrine Command with Army Futures Command, forming the "Army Transformation and Training Command". Under the merger, TRADOC headquarters personnel would relocate to Austin, Texas. In July, the Army announced the merger was set for October.

On 26 September 2025, the Training and Doctrine Command was ceremonially deactivated at Fort Eustis, Virginia. On 2 October 2025, TRADOC fully deactivated, in-step with the Transformation and Training Command, or T2COM, activation on 2 October.

== Sub-organizations ==
=== Core function leads ===
- Combined Arms Center (USACAC)
  - Army University
- Center for Initial Military Training
  - Basic Combat Training
    - Fort Benning
    - Fort Jackson
    - Fort Leonard Wood
    - Fort Sill
- Officer Candidate School
- United States Army Center of Military History, except the Institute of Heraldry, which remains within the Office of the Administrative Assistant to the Secretary of the Army (OAA)

=== Centers of excellence ===
- Aviation Center of Excellence (USAACE)
- Cyber Center of Excellence (CCoE)
  - Cyber School
  - Signal School
- Fires Center of Excellence (FCoE)
  - Field Artillery School
  - Air Defense Artillery School
- Intelligence Center of Excellence (USAICoE)
- Maneuver Center of Excellence (MCoE)
  - Armor School
  - Infantry School
- Maneuver Support Center of Excellence (MSCoE)
  - Engineer School
  - Chemical, Biological, Radiological, and Nuclear (CBRN) School
  - Military Police School
- Medical Department Center and School (MEDCoE)
- Mission Command Center of Excellence (MCCoE)
- NCO Leadership Center of Excellence (NCOLCoE)
  - Sergeants Major Academy
  - Fort Bliss NCO Academy
- Sustainment Center of Excellence (SCoE) (Combined Arms Support Command (CASCOM))
  - Adjutant General School
  - Army Sustainment University
    - Logistics Leader College
    - College of Professional and Continuing Education
    - Army Sustainment (professional publication)
    - NCO Academy
      - Transportation
      - Ordnance
      - Quartermaster
  - Financial Management School
  - Ordnance School
  - Quartermaster School
    - Joint Culinary Center of Excellence
  - Soldier Support Institute
  - Transportation School

=== Former ===
- United States Army Capabilities Integration Center
  - Joint Modernization Command

== Commanders ==
The final Commanding General was GEN Gary Brito. The final Command Sergeant Major was CSM Raymond S. Harris.

== See also ==
- John F. Kennedy Special Warfare Center and School
- United States Army Accessions Command - former subordinate command under TRADOC from 2002 to 2011
- Human dimension

U.S. Armed Forces training and education commands

- Marine Corps Training and Education Command
- Naval Education and Training Command
- Air Education and Training Command
- Space Training and Readiness Command
