= Stephen R. Lyons =

US Army general

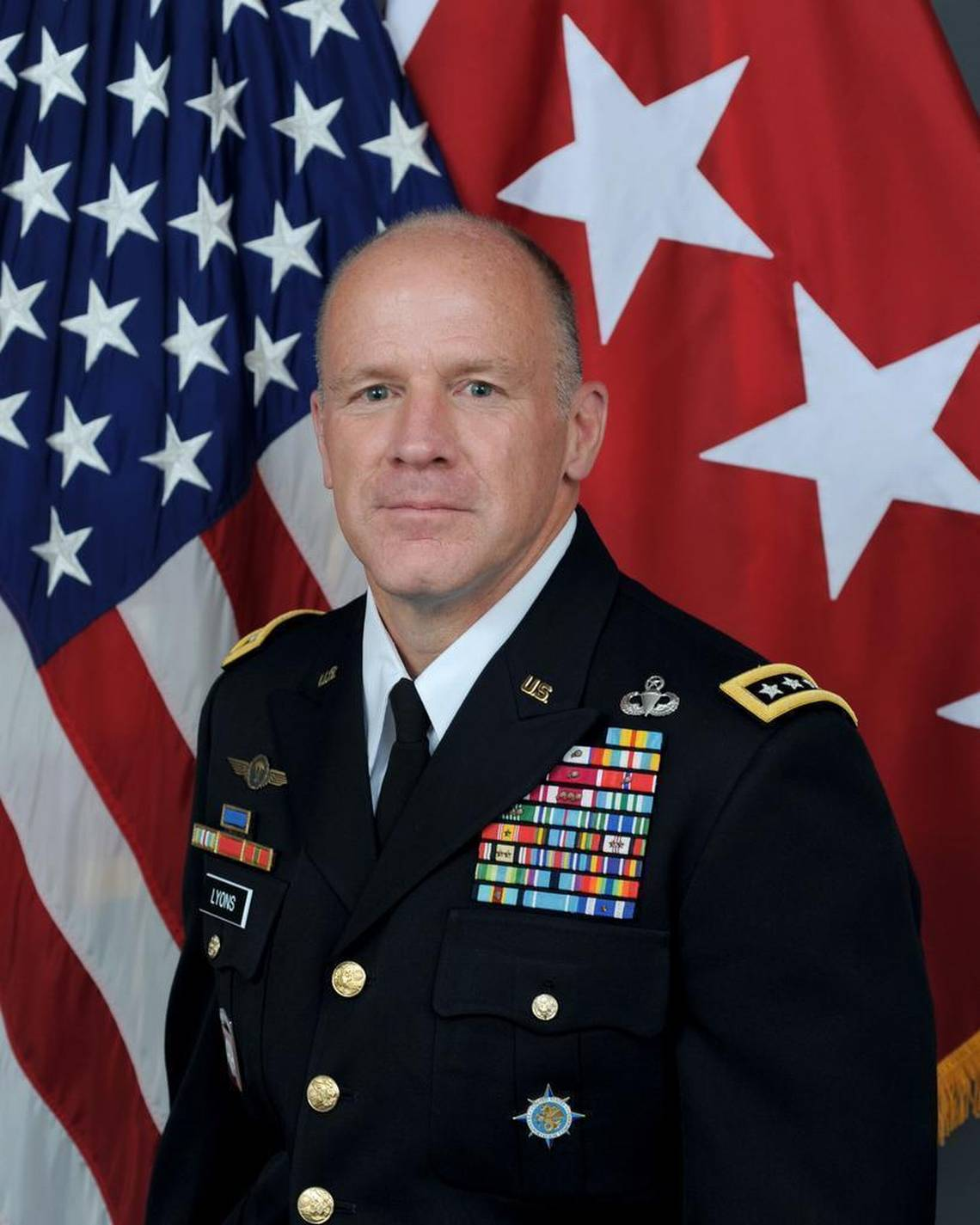
- Official portrait, 2018
- Born: Rensselaer, New York, United States
- Military career
- Allegiance: United States
- Branch: United States Army
- Service years: 1983 – 2021
- Rank: General
- Commands: United States Transportation Command; United States Army Combined Arms Support Command; 8th Theater Sustainment Command; 82nd Sustainment Brigade
- Conflicts: United States invasion of Panama; Iraq War; War in Afghanistan
- Awards: Defense Distinguished Service Medal (2); Army Distinguished Service Medal (2); Defense Superior Service Medal; Legion of Merit (2); Bronze Star Medal (2)

Stephen R. Lyons is a retired four-star general in the United States Army who last served as the 13th commander of the United States Transportation Command from August 2018 to October 2021. He previously served as the commanding general of United States Army Combined Arms Support Command/Sustainment Center of Excellence as well as the senior mission commander for Fort Lee, Virginia, from 2014 to 2015.

== Early life ==
Lyons is a 1979 graduate of the La Salle Institute, an all-male private Catholic college preparatory school in Troy, New York. He later earned an associate's degree in criminal justice from Hudson Valley Community College. In 1983, he graduated from the Rochester Institute of Technology and commissioned through ROTC as a second lieutenant in the Ordnance Corps.

== Military education ==
Lyons received a Master of Science degree in logistics management from the Naval Postgraduate School in 1993 and a Master of Science in national resource strategy from the Industrial College of the Armed Forces in 2005.

== Military career ==
Lyons served as battalion executive officer for the Division Support Command and also as the executive officer and Division Materiel Management Center Chief in the 1st Armored Division in Germany. Lyons was the Plans Officer for the J-4 United States Central Command. His battalion command was with the 703rd Main Support Battalion and he later served as the G-4 of the 3rd Infantry Division. He commanded the 82nd Airborne Division Support Command and later commanded the 82nd Sustainment Brigade. He served as the executive officer to the Commander, United States Army Materiel Command. He has served with the International Security Assistance Force (ISAF) as C/J-4. He was the Director, Logistics Operations, Readiness, Force Integration and Strategy at Headquarters, Department of the Army G-4.

Lyons commanded of the 8th Theater Sustainment Command (TSC) at Schofield Barracks, Hawaii from 2012 to 2014. The 8th TSC is responsible for logistics and sustainment of the army in the Pacific. The command spans 9,000 miles and controls units providing supplies, maintenance, transport, engineer, personnel, and military police from Alaska to Korea.

From August 22, 2014, to August 7, 2015, Lyons commanded the Combined Arms Support Command/Sustainment Center of Excellence at Fort Lee, Virginia.

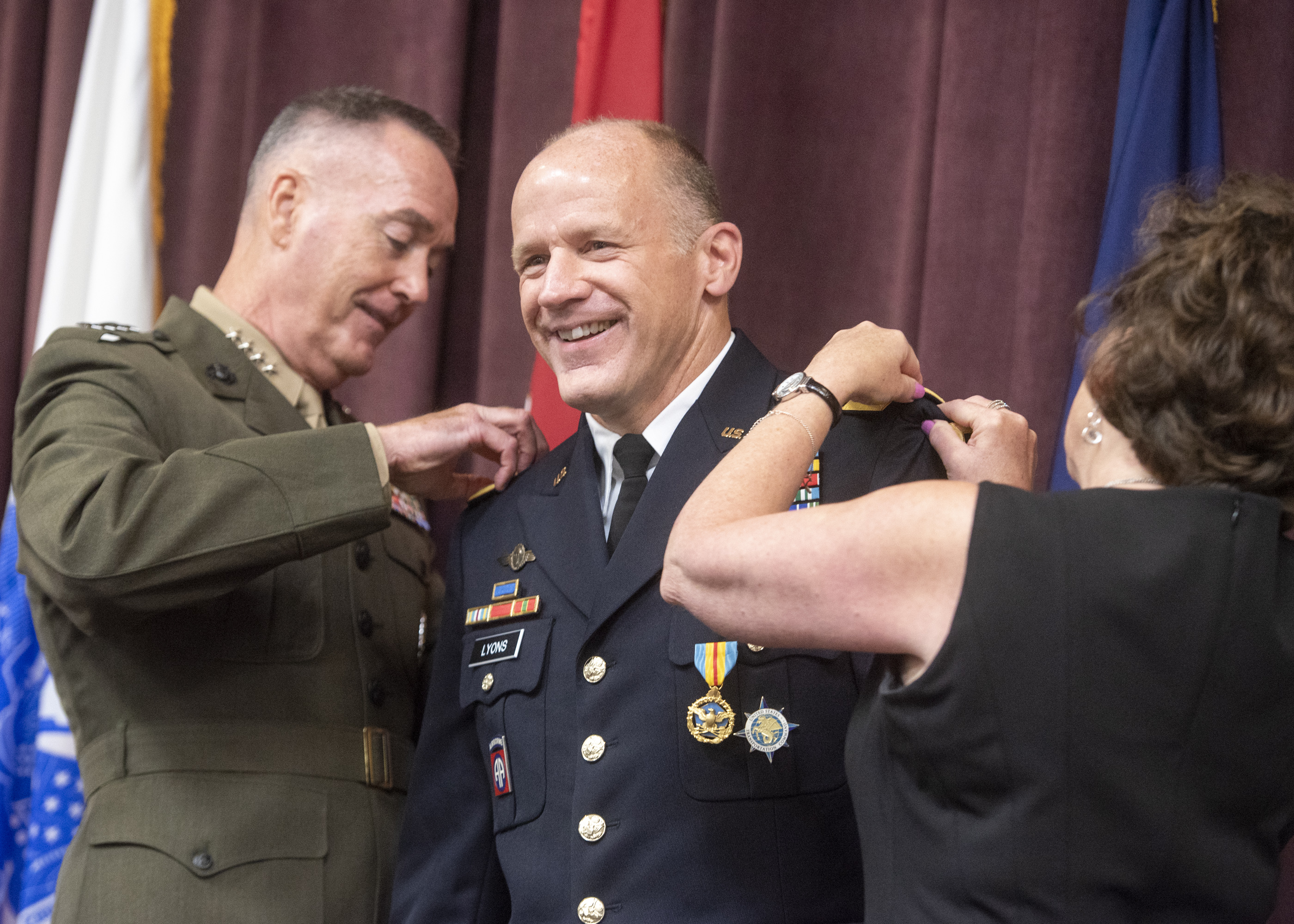
Lyons becoming a 4-star-general

Lyons deployed for two tours to Iraq (2003, 2006–2008) in support of Operation Iraqi Freedom and later to Afghanistan (2009–2011) in support of Operation Enduring Freedom. He was involved in Hurricane Katrina Relief Operations in New Orleans, Louisiana in 2005. He served in 1996 in Bosnia-Herzegovina during Operation Joint Endeavor as part of the Implementation Force (IFOR) and deployed in 1989 for Operation Just Cause in Panama.

After serving as the Deputy Commanding General for United States Transportation Command at Scott Air Force Base, Illinois, Lyons was assigned as the Director for Logistics (J4) on the Joint Staff. In April 2018, Lyons was nominated for promotion to general and assignment as commander of United States Transportation Command. He was confirmed by the United States Senate and took command of United States Transportation Command on August 24, 2018. Lyons is the first ever non-Air Force officer to lead Transportation Command.

His retirement ceremony was held on October 15, 2021, with the retirement effective November 30, 2021.

== Post-military career ==
On May 27, 2022, the White House and the U.S. Department of Transportation announced that Retired General Lyons, would be the new Port and Supply Chain Envoy to the Biden-Harris Administration's Supply Chain Disruptions Task Force, taking over the role from John Porcari. In this role, Lyons is responsible for working with ports, rail, trucking and other private companies across the transportation logistics supply chain to address bottlenecks, speed up the movement of goods, and help lower costs.

== Awards and decorations ==
Master Parachutist Badge
United States Transportation Command Badge
82nd Airborne Division CSIB
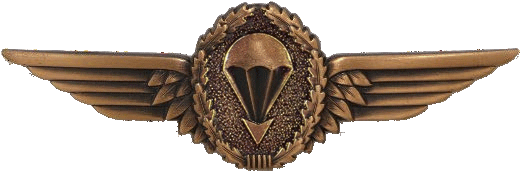
Parachutist Badge (Germany), bronze
7 Overseas Service Bars

Defense Distinguished Service Medal with one bronze oak leaf cluster
Army Distinguished Service Medal with oak leaf cluster
Defense Superior Service Medal
Legion of Merit with oak leaf cluster
Bronze Star Medal with oak leaf cluster
Defense Meritorious Service Medal
Meritorious Service Medal with three oak leaf clusters
Joint Service Commendation Medal
Army Commendation Medal with three oak leaf clusters
Joint Service Achievement Medal
Army Achievement Medal
Army Presidential Unit Citation
Joint Meritorious Unit Award with oak leaf cluster
Meritorious Unit Commendation
Superior Unit Award
National Defense Service Medal with one bronze service star
Armed Forces Expeditionary Medal
Afghanistan Campaign Medal with two service stars
Iraq Campaign Medal with two service stars
Global War on Terrorism Expeditionary Medal
Global War on Terrorism Service Medal
Armed Forces Service Medal
Humanitarian Service Medal
Army Service Ribbon
Army Overseas Service Ribbon with bronze award numeral 4
United Nations Medal
NATO Medal for ISAF with service star

Military offices
Preceded by ???	Deputy Chief of Staff for Logistics of the International Security Assistance Force; 2009–2011	Succeeded by Edward Dorman III
Preceded by ???	Director for Logistics Operations, Readiness, Force Integration and Strategy of the United States Army; 2011–2012	Succeeded by Edward Dorman III
Preceded by Michael J. Terry	Commanding General of the 8th Theater Sustainment Command; 2012–2014	Succeeded by Edward Dorman III
Preceded by Larry D. Wyche	Commanding General of the United States Army Combined Arms Support Command; 2014–2015	Succeeded by Darrell K. Williams
Preceded by William A. Brown	Deputy Commander of the United States Transportation Command; 2015–2017	Succeeded by John J. Broadmeadow
Preceded by William A. Brown	Director for Logistics of the Joint Staff; 2017–2018	Succeeded by Giovanni K. Tuck
Preceded by Darren W. McDew	Commander of the United States Transportation Command; 2018–2021	Succeeded by Jacqueline Van Ovost
