= Mark A. McAlister =

United States Army general

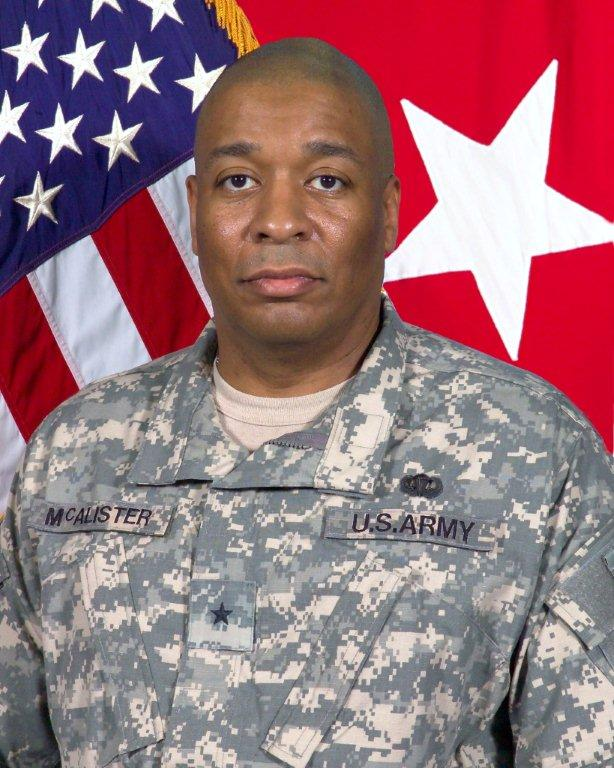
- Brigadier General Mark A. McAlister
- Military career
- Allegiance: United States of America
- Branch: United States Army
- Service years: 1981 - 2014
- Rank: Brigadier General
- Commands: Soldier Support Institute
- Awards: Legion of Merit; Bronze Star Medal

Brigadier General Mark A. McAlister, USA is the former Commanding General of the Soldier Support Institute at Fort Jackson, South Carolina which is responsible for training all of the Army's Human Resource and Financial Management soldiers.

== Education ==
Mark A. McAlister is a 1981 graduate of Hampton Institute with a Bachelor of Science degree in Accounting. He also holds a Master of Business Administration from Indiana University with Finance, Accounting, and Banking majors. His military education includes the Finance Officer Basic and Advanced Courses, Combined Arms and Service Staff School, the United States Army Command and General Staff College, and the Industrial College of the Armed Forces.

== Military career ==
He assumed his current assignment as the Commanding General, U.S. Army Soldier Support Institute on 1 July 2009.

Prior to joining the Soldier Support Institute, Brigadier General McAlister was assigned to the Pentagon as Executive Officer to the Assistant Secretary of the Army (Financial Management and Comptroller) and Chief of Plans, Programs and Budget Integration.

Among his many other assignments, Brigadier General McAlister has served as Commander of the 18th Soldier Support Group (Airborne), Fort Bragg, NC; Chief of the Army's Defense Integrated Military Human Resource System program; Chief of PERSCOM's Finance Branch; Commander of the 8th Finance Battalion, Baumholder, Germany; Executive Officer of the 208th Finance Battalion, Schwetzingen, Germany; S3 for the 266th Finance Command, Heidelberg, Germany; Brigade S1, 175th Theater Finance Command, Korea; Deputy Finance Officer, 82nd Airborne Division; and Chief Disbursing Division, Chief Military Pay, and Commander of the 107th Finance Section, Fort Bragg, North Carolina.

He has also served at the US Army Finance School, as the Executive Officer to the Chief of the Finance Corps/Commandant, Chief of Combat Development, and Chief of Finance Branch Personnel Proponency, Fort Benjamin Harrison, Indiana.

== Deployments ==
- Operation Support Hope in Rwanda
- Task Force Hawk in Albania
- Task Force Falcon in Kosovo
- Operation Iraqi Freedom I and III.

== Decorations and honors ==
- Legion of Merit with two Oak Leaf Cluster
- Bronze Star with one Oak Leaf Cluster
- Meritorious Service Medal with five Oak Leaf Clusters
- Joint Service Commendation Medal
- Army Commendation Medal with three Oak Leaf Clusters
- Army Achievement Medal with three Oak Leaf Clusters
- Department of the Army Staff Identification Badge
- Parachutist Badge
- German basic parachutist badge
