= Army Sustainment University =

U.S. Army's university for training in military logistics and sustainment

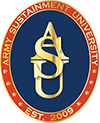
- Active: July 1, 1954 – present
- Country: United States of America
- Branch: United States Army
- Garrison/HQ: Fort Lee, Virginia (Somervell Campus); Fort Jackson, South Carolina (Adams Campus)
- Website: alu.army.mil

Commanders
- Commandant: Col. Steve A. Erickson

The Army Sustainment University (formerly Army Logistics University) is the United States Army's center of sustainment training for Department of Defense military and civilian personnel pursuing Professional Military Education (PME) and other associated training in military logistics and sustainment. The Army Sustainment University (ASU) has two campuses. The Somervell Campus at Fort Gregg-Adams, Virginia, delivers sustainment leader education for Quartermaster, Ordnance, and Transportation Soldiers and civilians. The Adams Campus at Fort Jackson, South Carolina, includes the Soldier Support Institute, which delivers Adjutant General and Financial Management leader education. ASU is a subordinate command to the United States Army Combined Arms Support Command, and is located at Fort Gregg-Adams, Virginia. The current president of Army Sustainment University is Ms. Sydney A. Smith, Senior Executive Service.

== Organization and Structure ==
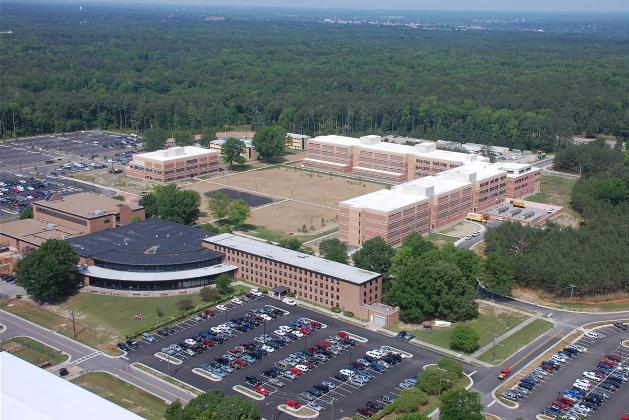
Army Sustainment University

The Somervell Campus of ASU at Fort Gregg-Adams includes three colleges and an academy, all of which offer instruction for military and civilian logistics leaders.

The Logistics Leaders College (LLC) provides Professional Military Education for officers from second lieutenant through colonel. Its programs include the Logistics Basic Officer Leader Course (LOG BOLC) for Quartermaster, Ordnance, and Transportation second lieutenants; the Logistics Captains Career Course (LOGC3); functional courses such as the Support Operations Course; and pre-command courses preparing lieutenant colonels and colonels to lead logistics formations.

The College of Applied Logistics and Operational Studies (CALOS) delivers functional education and training to military and civilian students in joint, multinational, operational, and strategic logistics. It also offers operations research systems analysis (ORSA) education for officers and civilian interns entering that career field, as well as acquisition and contracting training for both acquisition professionals and non-contracting personnel involved in operational contracting support. The Intern Logistics Studies Program (iLog) prepares civilian interns for future leadership roles in Army logistics.

The Technical Logistics College (TLC) conducts Professional Military Education for Quartermaster, Ordnance, and Transportation warrant officers and chief warrant officers at both basic and advanced levels. As technical sustainment specialists, warrant officers receive highly detailed and specialized training.

The Logistics Noncommissioned Officer Academy (LNCOA) provides Professional Military Education for noncommissioned officers in the Quartermaster, Ordnance, and Transportation branches at the staff sergeant and sergeant first class levels, through advanced and senior leader courses. Given that logistics personnel comprise 30–40 percent of the Army’s enlisted force, this training is essential to maintaining effective sustainment operations.

ASU also supports the Army Sustainment Professional Bulletin, a key publication covering past, present, and emerging sustainment trends, initiatives, and operations worldwide. Formerly known as Army Logistician, the bulletin has received multiple Secretary of the Army Editor of the Year awards and recognition for most improved publication, and continues to serve as a valuable resource for sustainment professionals.

== Army Sustainment University Presidents ==
	Name	Term began	Term ended
1.	Colonel Shelley A. Richardson	September 2005	May 2010
2.	Colonel Mark McCormick	July 2010	July 22, 2011
3.	Mr. John E. Hall SES	July 22, 2011	March 21, 2016
4.	Mr. Michael K. Williams SES	March 21, 2016	May 27, 2020
5.	Brigadier General James M. Smith	June 16, 2020	April 30, 2021
6.	Ms. Sydney A. Smith SES	April 30, 2021	Current

- Brigadier General James M. Smith served concurrently as ASU President and as U.S. Army Chief of Transportation following the death of Mr. Michael K. Williams who died while in office as President of ASU.

== History ==
=== Army Logistics Management Center (1954–1987) ===
The origin of ALMC was a 12-week Army Supply Management Course established on 1 July 1954 at Fort Lee, Virginia (now Fort Gregg-Adams). The course was established as a Class II Activity of the Quartermaster General, but with direct control exercised by the Deputy Chief of Staff for Logistics (DCSLOG) at the Department of the Army (DA) level.

On 1 May 1956, the U.S. Army Logistics Management Center (ALMC) was established under the operational control of the Department of the Army Deputy Chief of Staff for Logistics. Shortly thereafter, five new functional courses in management of requirements, procurement, distribution, maintenance, and property disposal were added to the curriculum. In September 1956, the ALMC curriculum expanded again to include correspondence courses and use of accredited instructors in off-campus modes. In September 1958, logistics research and doctrine were added as part of the mission of ALMC.

On 1 August 1962, ALMC was placed under the command of the U.S. Army Materiel Command (AMC). Under AMC, new emphasis was placed on instruction in management of research and development, acquisition management, and on integration of all phases of the life cycle of materiel.

On 21 July 1970, a new four-story brick academic building called Bunker Hall was dedicated on Fort Gregg-Adams (formerly Fort Lee and became the center of ALMC.

In March 1973, the Department of the Army approved establishment of two cooperative degree programs between ALMC and the Florida Institute of Technology. These cooperative programs use the instruction received during military programs to award transfer credit towards a master's degree in logistics.

=== Army Logistics Management College (1987–2009) ===
In August 1987, ALMC was redesignated as the U.S. Army Logistics Management College. ALMC offered courses in logistics leader development, acquisition management, integrated logistics support planning, materiel management, disposal operations management, installation logistics management, environmental management, hazardous materials handling, financial management, decision risk analysis, and quantitative analytical techniques.

On 1 October 1991, ALMC was transferred under the newly established U.S. Army Combined Arms Support Command based at Fort Gregg-Adams (formerly Fort Lee), VA.

In June 1992, ALMC began a program to prepare Captains and First Lieutenants in the Ordnance, Quartermaster, Transportation, Aviation, and Medical branches, to become Company Commanders and staff positions in multifunctional logistics and sustainment battalions. Renamed the Combined Logistics Captains Career Course (CLC3) in March 1999, CLC3 became ALMC's premiere course.

On 1 August 1992, ALMC became an affiliate of the Defense Acquisition University (DAU), a consortium of schools established to raise the level of professionalism in the Department of Defense acquisition workforce.

In September 2002, ALMC received formal accreditation as a non-degree-granting occupational education institution, recognized by the U.S. Department of Education.

ALMC graduated over 30,200 students in Fiscal Year 2002.

In January 2006, the U.S. Army Command and General Staff College (CGSC) established a permanent teaching team at ALMC. The first class of sixty-one students graduated on 19 April 2006.

=== Army Logistics University (2009–2023) ===
On 2 July 2009, Army Logistics Management College became the Army Logistics University with the dedication of ALU's new $100 million university campus.This change was brought by as part of the restructuring of the U.S. Army Training and Doctrine Command's (TRADOC) school system, the concurrent 2005 Base and Realignment (BRAC) decision to move the U.S. Army Ordnance Corps and Transportation Corps to Fort Lee, and the creation of the Sustainment Center of Excellence. The occasion was marked by speeches by Congressman Randy Forbes and Deputy Commanding General of TRADOC, Lieutenant General David Valcourt, who described ALU as the logistics center for the U.S. Army.

In the summer of 2009, on its 40th anniversary, Army Logistician was renamed Army Sustainment Magazine

In 2018, ALU re-organized and combined the three separate Basic Officers Leadership Courses (BOLC) for the Ordnance, Quartermaster, and Transportation Branches into a combined Logistics Basic Officer Leadership Course (LOG BOLC) in the ongoing effort to improve multi-functionality among the officer ranks.

In October 2020, the Logistics Non-Commissioned Officers Academy (LNCOA) was selected to develop Sustainment Common Core education across the Ordnance, Quartermaster, and Transportation Senior Leaders Courses (SLC).

In February 2021, the ALU Board of Directors was established to enable logistics enterprise governance of Logistics Officer, Warrant Officer, Non-commissioned Officer, and Department of the Army civilian cohorts.

From July to December 2021, ALU directly supported Operation Allies Welcome at Fort Gregg-Adams with the reception of Afghan refugees.

=== Army Sustainment University (2023–present) ===
On 1 May 2023, Army Logistics University was renamed Army Sustainment University with campuses at Fort Gregg-Adams, Virginia (Somervell Campus) and Fort Jackson, South Carolina (Adams Campus).

== See also ==
- LOGNet
