= United States Army Adjutant General School =

Adjutant General School
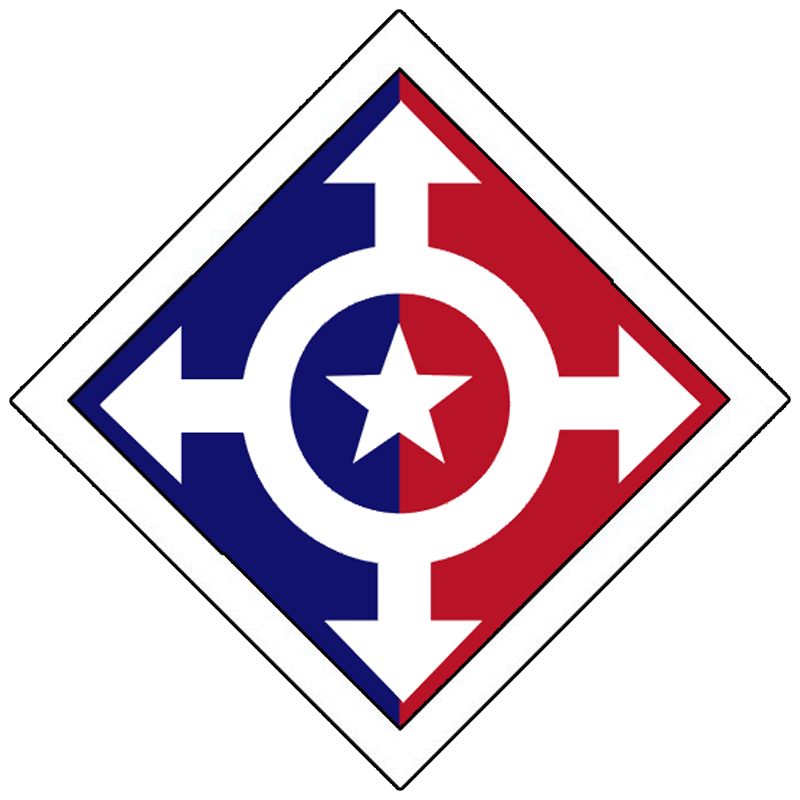
- Adjutant General School SSI
- Active: 1987–present
- Country: United States
- Allegiance: United States Army Transformation and Training Command
- Branch: United States Army
- Type: Administration school
- Role: Adjutant General Corps
- Size: Regiment
- Part of: Sustainment Center of Excellence
- Garrison/HQ: Fort Jackson, South Carolina

Commanders
- Commandant: Col. Chesley D. Thigpen
- Command Sergeant Major: CSM Jasmine Young

Insignia
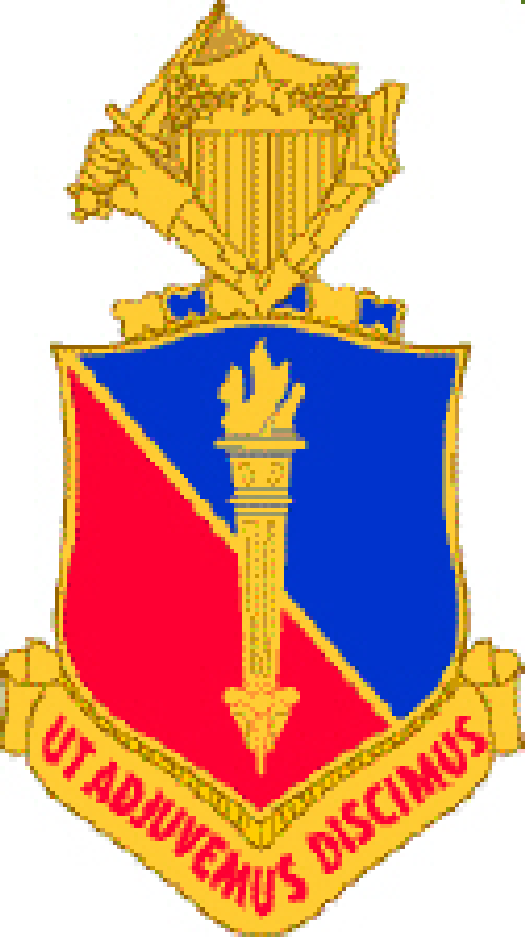
- US Army Adjutant General School DUI

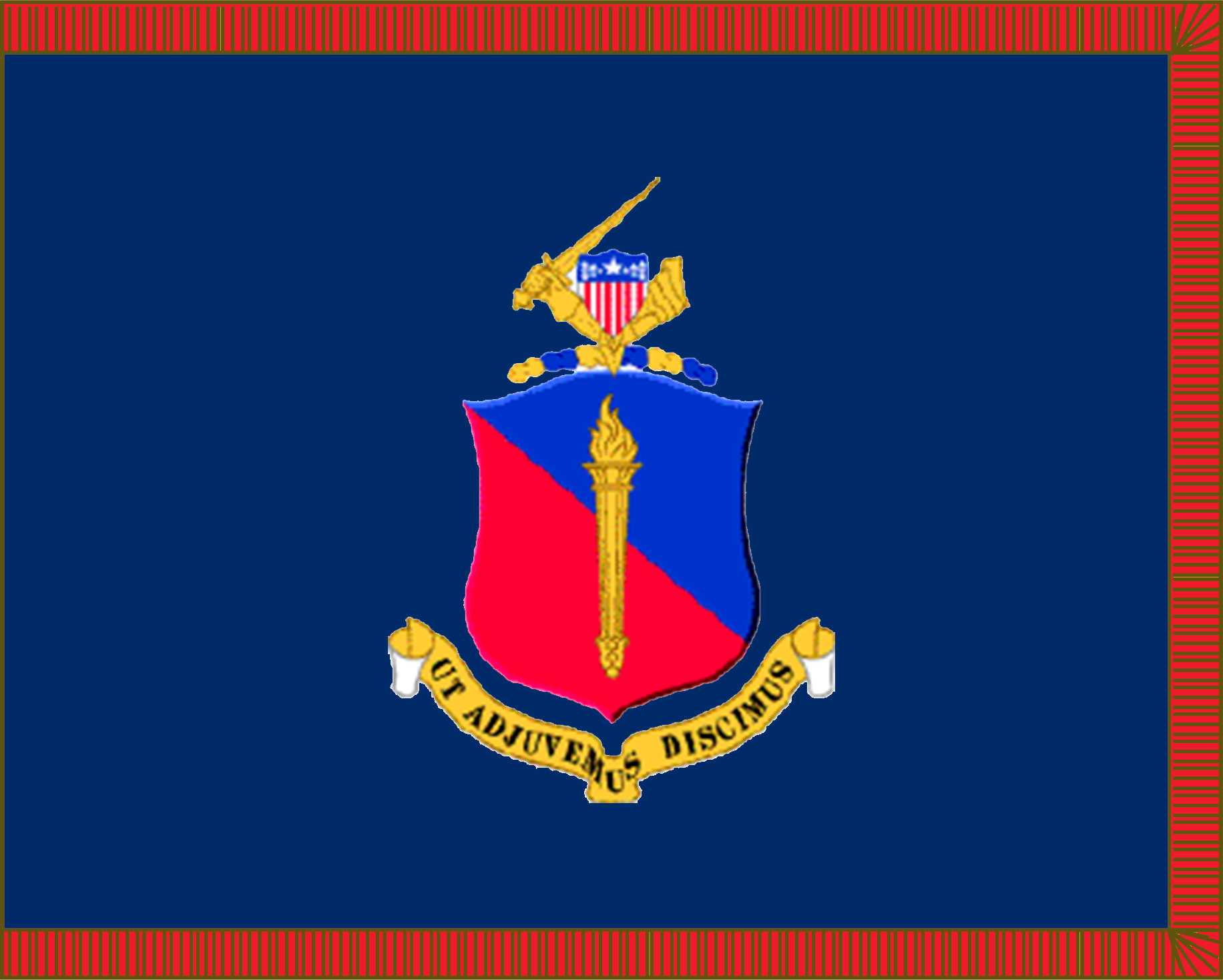
- US Army Adjutant General School Flag (2026).png

The Adjutant General School and the Soldier Support Institute (SSI) are located at Fort Jackson, South Carolina. The school was formerly located at Fort Benjamin Harrison, Indiana, until its closure. These provide training and development of doctrine and organization for Army personnel and administrative operations. Along with the U.S. Army Forces Command (FORSCOM), United States Army Training and Doctrine Command (TRADOC) was created from the Continental Army Command (CONARC) located at Fort Monroe, VA on 1 July 1973. Today, TRADOC is the overseer of training of the Army forces, the development of operational doctrine, and the development and procurement of new weapons systems. The reconstructed Adjutant General Corp Regiment (AG) was created in 1987. The U.S. Army administration and finance specialists are trained at the Adjutant General School located at Fort Jackson. Today's AG Corps serves as human resource (HR) managers for the Army.

The Adjutant General School's mission statement is:

Train and develop agile leaders and Soldiers who provide human resources and music support to the force. Develop human resource (HR) concepts, doctrine, training and organizational designs to support an expeditionary Army in war and in peace.

== AG School ==
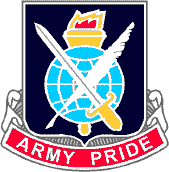
369th AG Battalion distinctive unit insignia

The Adjutant General School (AGS) educates and provides Administrative Specialists for the U.S. Army. The training audience consist of personnel from the Army National Guard (ARNG), U.S. Army Reserves (USAR), and Active Army HR units. Army School of Music (ASOM), Finance School, Postal School, NCO Academy, Recruiting and Retention School are among the structure. Newly assigned officers and enlisted students to the Adjutant General Corps receive their training at Fort Jackson nearby Columbia, South Carolina.

The Adjutant General School at Fort Jackson provides training to develop confident tactically and technically competent Adjutant General Officers who can lead and prepare Soldiers and units for war. The school emphasize Army values, ethics, leadership, readiness, and service to commanders, Soldiers and families. These educators also develop training products for personnel Soldiers, NCOs, and Officers.

The 369th AG Battalion provides the trained, ready and agile Soldiers across the spectrum of Military Occupational Skills (MOS) 27D, 36B, 42A, and 42F completing the Initial Entry Training process. The Battalion consists of four Companies. The CMF 42 Soldiers (Career Management Fields) must have a valid Secret security clearance processed through respective S2’a for their security clearance upon arrival at units.

An example of the Adjutant General assignments can be seen from SSI Collective Training, The Warfighter Training Support Package, Conduct Casualty Operations. At the direction of TRADOC, the AGS developed a concept and road ahead to incorporate gaming with the development of a brigade level HR training database.

Each branch of the Army has Career Management Fields (CMF) with corresponding Military Occupational Specialties (Skills)— MOS. For example, the Infantry Branch has CMF 11 (Infantry) with MOS 11B (Infantryman), 11C (Indirect Fire Infantryman), MOS 11X (Infantry Enlistment Option), and MOS 11Z (Infantry Senior Sergeant). Detailed skill level or training degree (schooling) follows the MOS, as example, 11X4O would be a section leader. According to "The US Army Info Site" run by U.S. Army personnel on a private level, occupational codes is/will be changing in the coming years ().

== AG Personnel Proponent ==
The Adjutant General Personnel Proponent, also referred to as the Proponency/Leader Development Division (PLDD), is a division of the U.S. Army Adjutant General School. It is responsible for the eight personnel proponent systems life-cycle functions (Structure, Acquisition, Distribution, Development, Deployment, Compensation, Sustainment, & Transition) for the Human Resource (HR) field in the following personnel areas: officer branch 42, warrant officer branch 420A and 420C, enlisted Career Management Field (CMF) 42 (MOS 42A, 42F), postal (ASI F4 and F5), CMF 42 Army Bands (MOS 42R, 42S), and DA civilian career fields 50 and 57. PLDD functions and responsibilities are to evaluate, coordinate and develop.

According to their official website, The Proponency/Leader Development Division (PLDD) Reviews, recommends, and coordinates actions related to AR 5–22, AR 600-3, and other DA proponent regulations. PLDD evaluates the AG personnel inventory and recommends adjustments to support authorized positions and force structure changes. The division develops, coordinates, and maintains the Function Review (FR) and the Functional Area Assessment (FAA) programs and develops professional development publications for CMF and branch specialties. From these and other consideration, the division coordinates Manpower Requirements Criteria (MARC) studies/standards with U.S. Army Force Management Support Agency (USAFMSA) and coordinates with other personnel agencies on proponent issues related to force structure, unit deployment, and the life cycle management process.

Today's HR ORGANIZATIONS AND HR STAFF ELEMENTS (Adjutant General) command structure: ASCC G-1/AG, Corps/Division G-1/AG, Brigade S-1 Section, Brigade S-1 Positioning, Battalion S-1 Section, HR Operations Branch (HROB), Performance Indicators Monitored by the HROB, HR Sustainment Center (HRSC), Military Mail Terminal (MMT) Team. (Field Manual No. 1-0, 2010).

== AG history ==
On 16 June 1775, the Continental Congress appointed Horatio Gates, a former British Army officer, as the first Adjutant General to George Washington with the commission of a brigadier general. Historically, he was the second officer to receive a commission in the Continental Army, preceded only by George Washington. With that appointment, the second oldest existing branch of the Army was born.

On 14 December 1872, the Adjutant General's Department adopted the old topographic engineer shield as its own branch insignia. The shield symbolized the Adjutant General's role of speaking "for the commander". Thirteen embossed stars replaced the "T.E." on the upper shield, creating the crest worn by all Adjutant General Corps officers and the U.S. Army Bands. The chief administrative officer is normally subordinated to the unit Chief of Staff, and is known as the G-1.

Adjutant General's Department was established by the Act of 3 March 1813. The department was redesignated the Adjutant General Corps in 1950. The Career Management Fields at the time consist of Public Affairs(46), Administration(71), Chaplain Assistant(56), Personnel(75), Recruiting/Retention(79), Band(02). As earlier mentioned, the reconstructed Adjutant General Corp Regiment (AG) was created in 1987.

The Branch Type Combat Service Support has seen Alphanumeric changes in recent years. In fiscal year 2002 CMF 71D(Legal Specialist) moved to CMF 27D. In fiscal year 2005, Personnel CMF changed from 75 to 42 and about the same time, 75B and 75H merged into a single MOS(42A: Human Resources Specialist). The Band CMF 02A(Band Member) and 02S(Special Band Member) moved to the Personnel CMF also in fiscal year 2005. Administration CMF 71L(Administrative Specialist) was deleted by fiscal year 2008. Administration is no longer a CMF 71 according to the "US Army Info Site."

== See also ==
- List of Adjutant Generals of the U.S. Army.
- United States Army branch insignia.
