= Larry D. Wyche =

United States Army general

Larry Wyche
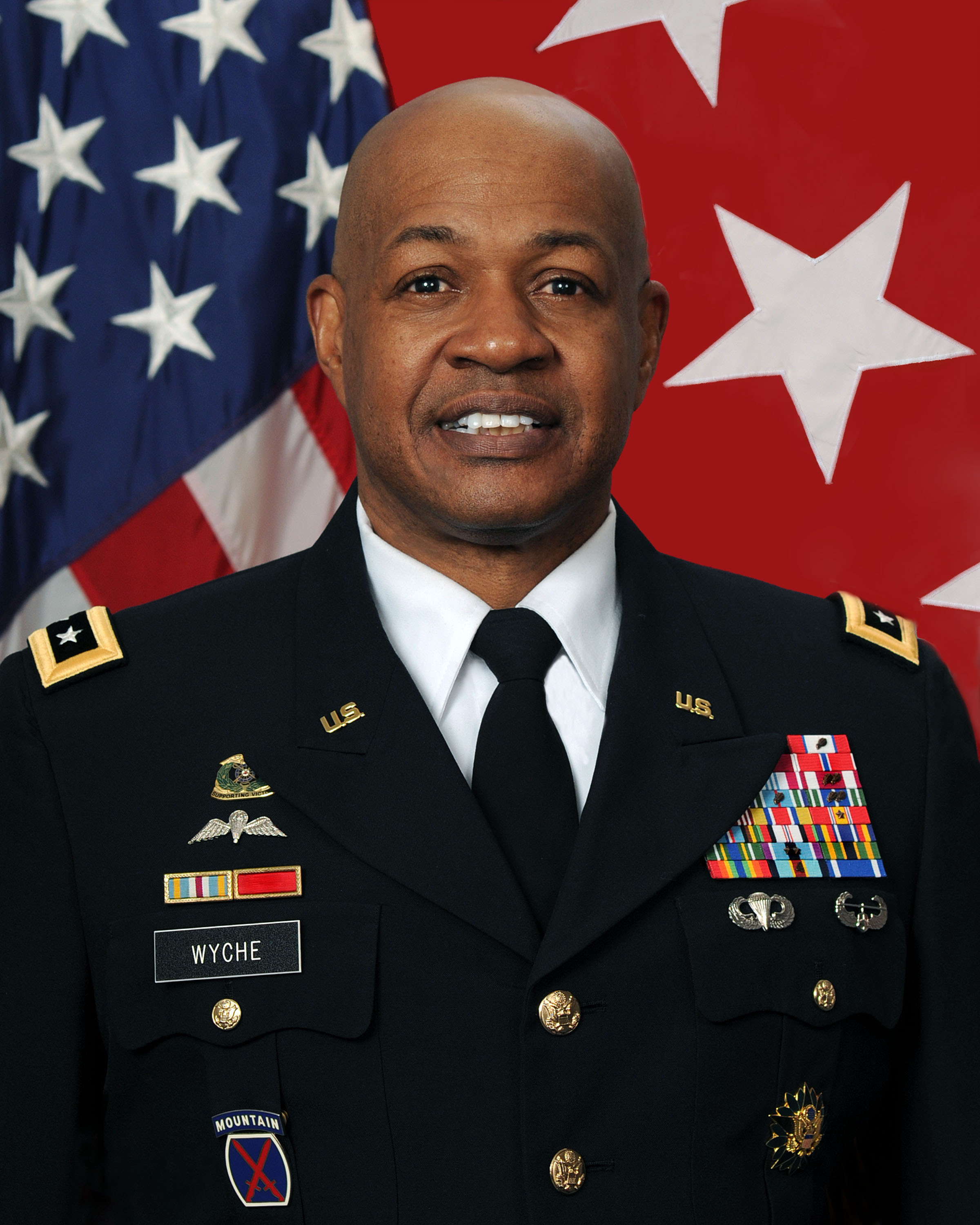
- Lieutenant General Larry Wyche
- Born: 1957 (age 68–69); Emporia, Virginia, U.S.
- Military career
- Allegiance: United States
- Branch: United States Army
- Service years: 1982 - 2017
- Rank: Lieutenant General
- Commands: Combined Arms Support Command; Sustainment Center of Excellence; Joint Munitions Command; 10th Sustainment Brigade; 4th Forward Support Battalion
- Conflicts: Global war on terrorism: Operation Enduring Freedom
- Awards: Distinguished Service Medal (3); Legion of Merit (2); Bronze Star

Larry Wyche (born 1957) is a retired United States Army Lieutenant General. He last served as the deputy commanding general of the U.S. Army Materiel Command. Prior to his last assignment, Wyche served as the Special Assistant to the Commanding General, U.S. Army Training and Doctrine Command. He has also served as commanding general of the Combined Arms Support Command, commanding general of the Sustainment Center of Excellence (SCoE) and Senior Mission Commander for Fort Lee, Virginia.

"We are Warfighter Logisticians and Supporters, prepared to give the shirts off our backs and boots off our feet, to support the fight. We will never say no, as long as there is one gallon of gas to give, or one bullet to give"

== Early life and education ==
Wyche was born and raised on 10 November 1957 in Emporia, VA. He is 1974 graduate of Greensville County High School in Emporia. Wyche received his commission as a Quartermaster officer and his Bachelor of Business Administration (BBA) from Texas A&M University–Corpus Christi in May 1982. He earned a master's degree in Logistics Management from the Florida Institute of Technology, and National Resource Strategy from the Industrial College of the Armed Forces. He is a graduate of the Industrial College of the Armed Forces; Joint Professional Military Education Course; Armed Forces Staff College; Command and General Staff College; and Logistics Executive Development Course.

== Military career ==
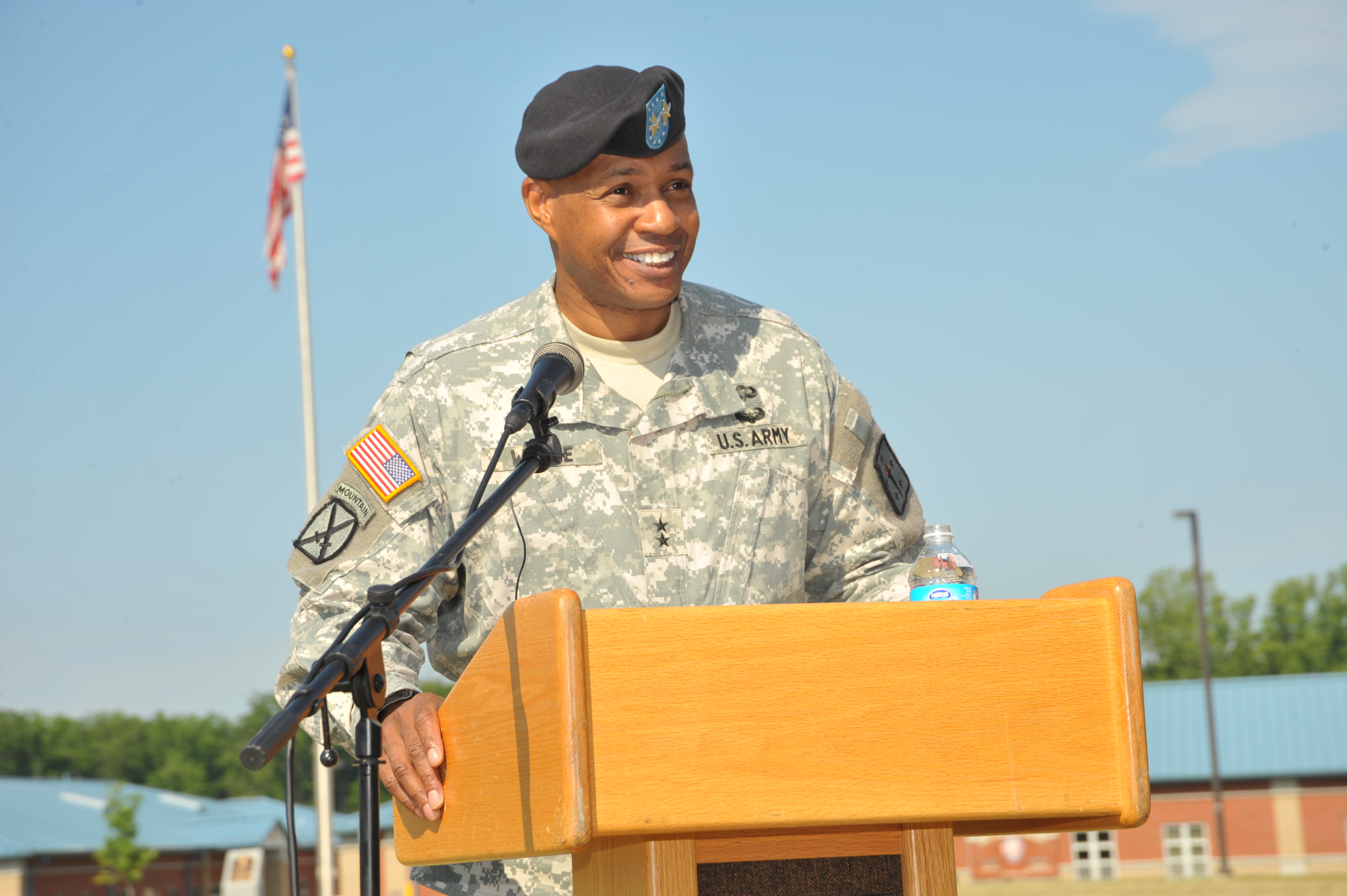
Wyche speaking during a change of command ceremony at the Ordnance Center and School.

Wyche started his career in the enlisted ranks and achieved the rank of Sergeant while serving as a cavalry scout squad leader. Wyche was commissioned as a second lieutenant after graduation from Texas A&M University-Corpus Christi. His initial assignment was in the 267th Quartermaster Company, 240th Quartermaster Battalion, Fort Lee, VA where he served as a platoon leader. Following this assignment and attendance at the Quartermaster Officer Advance Course, he was assigned to Eighth United States Army, Korea where he commanded 114th Quartermaster Company, 2nd Quartermaster Group. Upon completing company command, Wyche attended Florida Institute of Technology where he completed studies for a Master's degree in Logistics Management. He was then assigned to the 5th Infantry Division, Fort Polk, LA where he served in Plans and Operations, and later as Supply and Services Officer, G-4. After a 2-year tour at Fort Polk, Wyche was assigned to the 2nd Armored Division, Fort Hood, TX where he served as the Chief of the Maintenance and Supply Branch, G-4.

After his selection and subsequent completion of the U.S. Army Command and General Staff College, Fort Leavenworth, Kansas, he was assigned as Chief of Readiness, G-4, XVIII Airborne Corps, Fort Bragg, NC during Operation Uphold Democracy, Haiti. Following this assignment Wyche served as the S-3, 46th Corps Support Group and Executive Officer, 189th Corps Support Battalion, 1st Corps Support Command, Fort Bragg, NC. In 1997, Wyche returned to Korea where he served as a Joint Logistics Plans Officer, C-4, United Nations Command/Combined Forces Command/United States Forces Korea. Wyche returned to Fort Hood and commanded the 4th Forward Support Battalion, 4th Infantry Division, Fort Hood, TX.

Following graduation from the Industrial College of the Armed Forces, Fort Lesley J. McNair, Wyche was assigned to the Pentagon to serve as Chief, Initiatives Group, later Chief, Focused Logistics Division, Force Development Directorate, G-8, United States Army, Washington, DC. He was later selected to command the 10th Sustainment Brigade, Fort Drum, NY with duty as Commander, Joint Logistics Command, Combined Joint Task Force-76, Bagram Airfield, Afghanistan OPERATION ENDURING FREEDOM. After brigade command, Wyche returned to the Pentagon to serve as Director for Strategy and Integration, Office of the Deputy Chief of Staff, G-4, Washington, DC.

On 1 August 2008, Wyche took command of the Joint Munitions and Lethality Life Cycle Management Command/Joint Munitions Command, Rock Island, IL. This command includes over 15,000 employees and Soldiers with depots, plants, and arsenals in 17 locations. The organization manages the ammunition manufacturing plants and storage depots that provide ammunition to all military services, other Defense and federal agencies, and allied nations. His next position was Deputy Chief of Staff for Logistics and Operations, United States Army Materiel Command, Redstone Arsenal, AL from August 2010 to June 2012.

On 28 June 2012, Wyche became the Commanding General of the Combined Arms Support Command (CASCOM)/Sustainment Center of Excellence and Fort Lee, VA. CASCOM, as a major subordinate command of the Training and Doctrine Command (TRADOC), trains and educates Soldiers and Civilians, develops and integrates capabilities, concepts and doctrine, and executes functional proponency to enable the Army's Sustainment Warfighting Function.

Wyche relinquished command of CASCOM on 22 August 2014 and was assigned as the Special Assistant to the Commanding General, U.S. Army Training and Doctrine Command, Joint Base Langley–Eustis, VA. His promotion to lieutenant general was approved by the U.S. Senate on 11 December 2014. He received this promotion on 10 April 2015 after the retirement of Lieutenant General Patricia McQuistion, his predecessor as deputy commander of the U.S. Army Materiel Command.

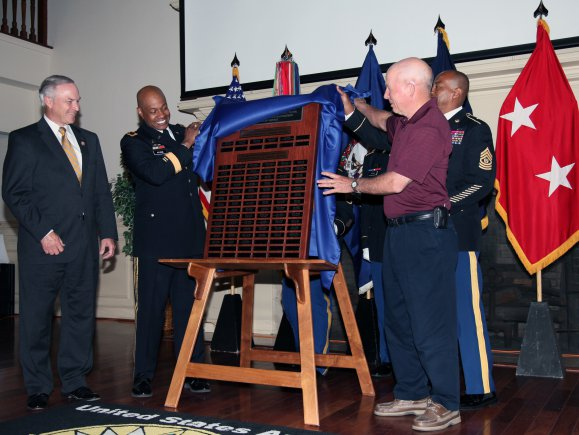
CASCOM recognizes DA Civilians with 40 or more years of service. Congressman Randy Forbes and MG Wyche unveils the commemorative plaque.

=== Dates of rank ===
Promotions
Rank	Date
Lieutenant General	10 April 2015
Major General	3 August 2011
Brigadier General	2 November 2008
Colonel	1 April 2004
Lieutenant Colonel	1 June 1998
Major	1 July 1994
Captain	1 March 1985
First Lieutenant	18 October 1984
Second Lieutenant	26 May 1982

== Awards and decorations ==
Army Staff Identification Badge

Parachutist Badge

Air Assault Badge

Distinguished Service Medal with two oak leaf clusters
Legion of Merit with oak leaf cluster
Bronze Star
Defense Meritorious Service Medal
Meritorious Service Medal with two oak leaf clusters
Army Commendation Medal with three oak leaf clusters
Joint Service Achievement Medal with oak leaf cluster
Army Achievement Medal with oak leaf cluster
Army Reserve Component Achievement Medal
Armed Forces Expeditionary Medal
Global War on Terrorism Service Medal
Afghanistan Campaign Medal
Humanitarian Service Medal
