= Army Sustainment Resource Portal =

US Army logistics website

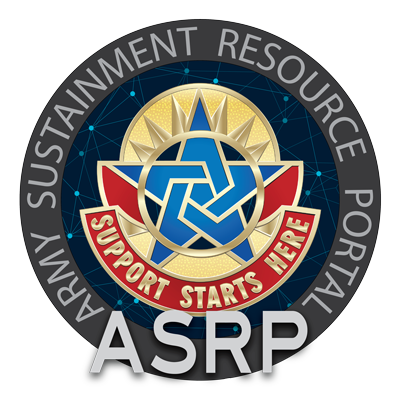
Army Sustainment Resource Portal (ASRP) Insignia

The Army Sustainment Resource Portal (formerly named Sustainment Unit One Stop) is a website that offers links for sustainment resources pertinent to the U.S. Army operational force, which is maintained by the Combined Arms Support Command (CASCOM).

The goal of the Army Sustainment Resource Portal is to provide simple, consolidated and searchable access to the most relevant and authoritative sustainment products for the United States Army, which offers soldiers training and doctrine resources, as well as products, lessons learned, leadership development, operations process, virtual training products, and training focus areas. It also serves to provide access to proponent-specific resources for Quartermaster, Ordnance, Transportation, Financial Management and Human Resources.
