= James L. Hodge =

United States Army general

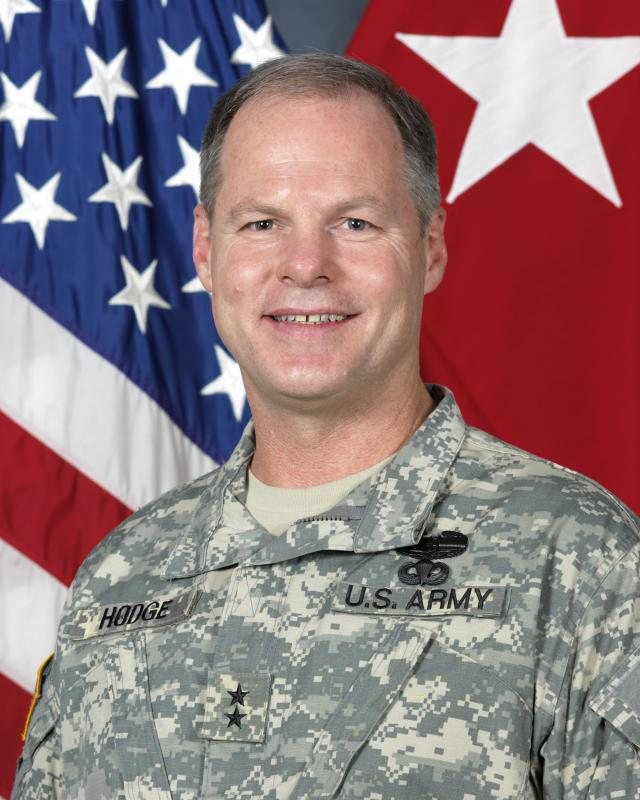
- Major General James L. Hodge
- Military career
- Allegiance: United States
- Branch: United States Army
- Service years: 1978 - 2012
- Rank: Major General
- Commands: Combined Arms Support Command; Sustainment Center of Excellence
- Conflicts: Iraq War
- Awards: Distinguished Service Medal; Legion of Merit; Bronze Star Medal

James L. Hodge, (born c. 1954) is a retired major general in the United States Army and former commanding general, Combined Arms Support Command, Sustainment Center of Excellence (SCoE) and the Senior Mission Commander for Fort Lee, Virginia.

== Education ==
In 1978, Major General Hodge graduated from the United States Military Academy with a Bachelor of Science degree and was commissioned into the Transportation Corps. He was a member of the 1977 Army football team that beat Navy and won the Commander in Chief's Trophy. He holds a Master of Science degree in systems management from the University of Southern California and a Master of Science in strategic studies from the United States Army War College. His military education includes the Transportation Officer Basic and Advanced Courses, the Operational Research and Systems Analysis Military Applications Course, the Army Command and General Staff College, and the Defense Language Institute.

== Military career ==
Major General Hodge has commanded the 100th Transportation Company, Fort Eustis, Virginia; 64th Forward Support Battalion, 4th Infantry Division (Mechanized), Fort Carson, Colorado; Division Support Command, 3rd Infantry Division (Mechanized), Fort Stewart, Georgia, and Operation Iraqi Freedom, Iraq; Army Materiel Command Southwest Asia and G-4, United States Army Central Command, Camp Arifjan, Kuwait; and most recently, Military Surface Deployment and Distribution Command, Scott Air Force Base, Ill. Hodge served as the 3rd Infantry Division Support Command Commander during the initial attack into Iraq and the fall of Baghdad in 2003.

He has also served in a variety of multifunctional logistics assignments to include: Platoon Leader; Instructor, Transportation and Aviation Logistics School, Fort Eustis, Virginia; Personnel Systems Research Analyst and Assignments Officer, U.S. Army Personnel Command, Alexandria, Virginia; Executive Officer and S-4, 99th Forward Support Battalion, 2nd Armored Cavalry Regiment (Light), Fort Lewis, Washington; Transportation Staff Officer, U.S. European Command, Germany; Transportation Corps Representative, the Officer Personnel Management System XXI Task Force, Alexandria, Virginia; Assistant Chief of Staff, G-4, 4th Infantry Division (Mechanized), Fort Hood, Texas; Chief, Logistics Plans Division, U.S. Central Command, MacDill Air Force Base, Florida and Camp As Salayah, Qatar; Executive Officer to the Commanding General, Army Materiel Command, Fort Belvoir, Virginia.

Hodge commanded of the United States Army Combined Arms Support Command (CASCOM) and the Sustainment Center of Excellence (SCoE) from September 9, 2010, to June 26, 2012. Hodge retired from the United States Army on October 1, 2012.

== Awards and decorations ==
Combat Action Badge
Parachutist Badge

Distinguished Service Medal
Legion of Merit with three oak leaf clusters
Bronze Star
Defense Meritorious Service Medal with two oak leaf clusters
Meritorious Service Medal with five oak leaf clusters
Army Commendation Medal with two oak leaf clusters
Army Achievement Medal with oak leaf cluster
National Defense Service Medal with service star
Iraqi Campaign Medal
Global War on Terrorism Expeditionary Medal
Armed Forces Service Medal
Humanitarian Service Medal
Army Service Ribbon
Army Overseas Service Ribbon
