= Darren W. McDew =

USAF General, Commander - Air Mobility Command (Ret)

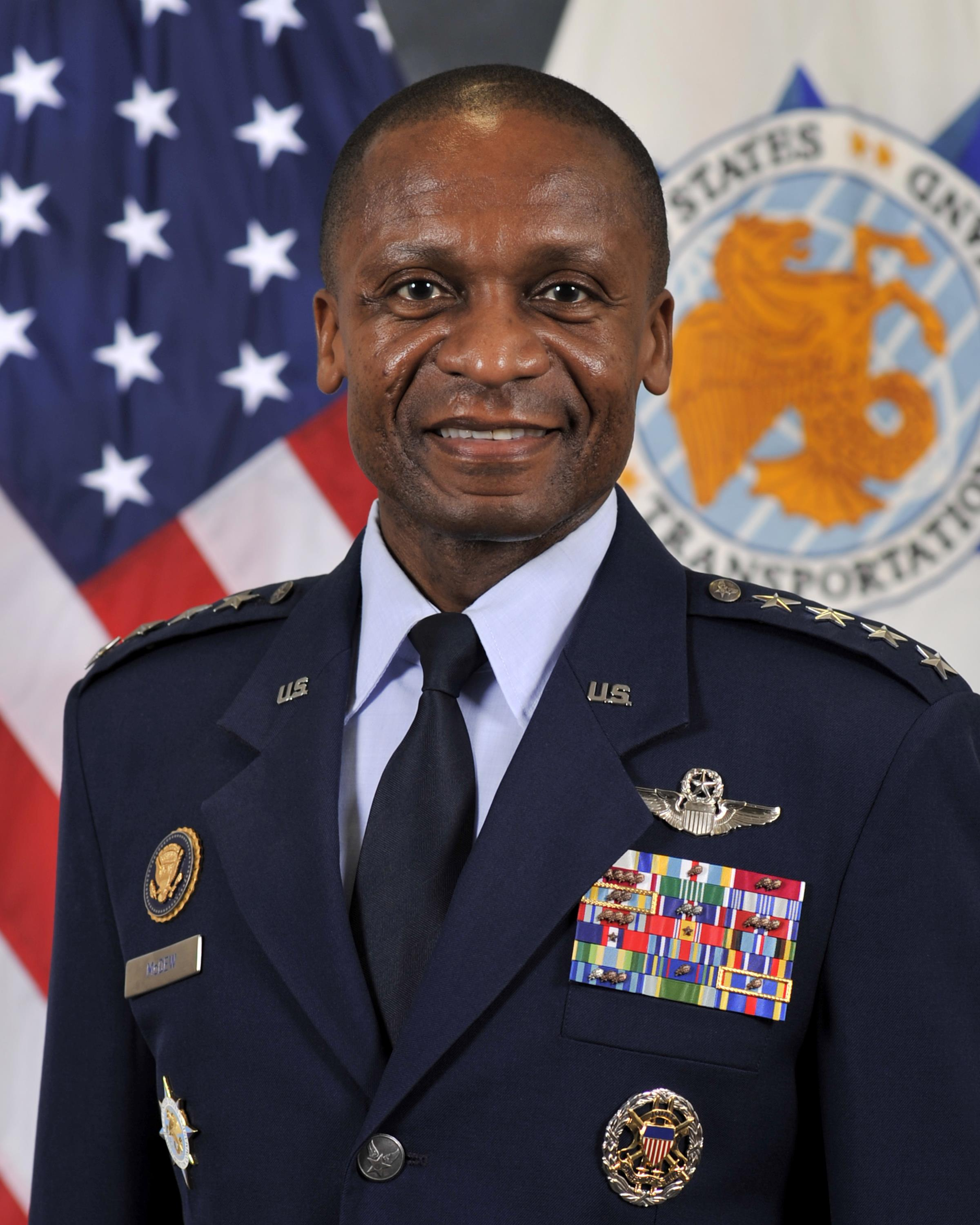
- Born: September 29, 1960 (age 66); Rantoul, Illinois, United States
- Military career
- Allegiance: United States
- Branch: United States Air Force
- Service years: 1982–2018
- Rank: General
- Commands: United States Transportation Command; Air Mobility Command; Eighteenth Air Force; Air Force District of Washington; 43rd Airlift Wing; 375th Airlift Wing; 62nd Operations Group; 14th Airlift Squadron
- Awards: Defense Distinguished Service Medal; Air Force Distinguished Service Medal (2); Defense Superior Service Medal (2); Legion of Merit (3)

Darren Wayne McDew (born September 29, 1960) is a retired United States Air Force general who served as the Commander of United States Transportation Command at Scott Air Force Base, Illinois. His previous senior command positions include Commander of Air Mobility Command as a general and Commander, Eighteenth Air Force (18AF) as a lieutenant general. In March, 2019, soon after General McDew's retirement, United States Secretary of Transportation Elaine Chao named him as Co-Chair of the Special Committee to Review the Federal Aviation Administration's Aircraft Certification Process. According to a letter from Secretary Chao, the Special Committee is "specifically tasked to review the 737 MAX 800 certification process from 2012 to 2017."

McDew is a Command Pilot with over 3,300 hours of flight time. He has flown the T-37B, T-38A, KC-135A/R, C-17A, C-141B, C-9, C-21, C-130E/H, and UH-1N. His personal decorations include the Defense Distinguished Service Medal, Air Force Distinguished Service Medal, the Defense Superior Service Medal, and the Legion of Merit, among others.

McDew married in 1983 to the former Evelyn K. Massenburg. They have a daughter, Keisha, and a son, Keith, an officer in the United States Coast Guard.

== Assignments ==
McDew was born in Rantoul, Illinois in 1960. Upon graduation from Virginia Military Institute in 1982 as the first African American Regimental Commander with a Bachelor of Science degree in Civil Engineering, McDew was commissioned as a second lieutenant in the United States Air Force and, following flight training, began his operational flying career at Loring Air Force Base, Maine. His staff assignments include serving as a member of the Air Force Chief of Staff Operations Group, Air Force aide to the President, chief of the Air Force Senate Liaison Division and the director of Air Force Public Affairs. McDew served as vice director for Strategic Plans and Policy for the Chairman of the Joint Chiefs of Staff. He also served as the commander of Eighteenth Air Force at Scott Air Force Base, and commanded at the squadron, group and wing levels as well as at an Air Force direct reporting unit. He deployed in support of ongoing operations in Central and Southwest Asia as an air expeditionary group commander and later as the director of mobility forces. Prior to his final assignment, McDew was the commander of Air Mobility Command.

In the course of his career McDew completed the following assignments:

1. October 1982 – October 1983, Student, undergraduate pilot training, 82d Flying Training Wing, Williams AFB, AZ
2. October 1983 – March 1984, KC-135 combat crew training, 93rd Bomb Wing, Castle AFB, CA
3. March 1984 – June 1989, Standardization and Evaluation Copilot, Aircraft Commander, Instructor Pilot and Flight commander, 42nd Air Refueling Squadron, Loring AFB, ME
4. July 1989 – June 1992, Combat Crew Training School examiner and Instructor Pilot, Assistant Deputy Wing Inspector and Wing Executive Officer, 93rd Bomb Wing, Castle AFB, CA
5. July 1992 – April 1994, Rated Force Planner, Directorate of Personnel Plans; member, Air Force Chief of Staff Operations Group, Headquarters U.S. Air Force, Washington, D.C.
6. April 1994 – June 1996, Air Force aide to the President (Bill Clinton), White House, Washington, D.C.
7. October 1996 – June 1997, Assistant Operations Officer, 14th Airlift Squadron, Charleston AFB, SC
8. June 1997 – June 1999, Commander, 14th Airlift Squadron, Charleston AFB, SC
9. August 1999 – July 2000, Secretary of Defense Corporate Fellow, Sun Microsystems Inc., Palo Alto, Calif.
10. July 2000 – January 2002, Commander, 62nd Operations Group, McChord AFB, WA. (TDY September 2001 – December 2001, Commander, 60th Air Expeditionary Group, Southwest Asia)
11. January 2002 – July 2003, Commander, 375th Airlift Wing, and Installation Commander, Scott AFB, IL
12. July 2003 – January 2005, Chief, U.S. Air Force Senate Liaison Division, Secretary of the Air Force, Washington, D.C.
13. January 2005 – July 2006, Commander, 43rd Airlift Wing, and Installation Commander, Pope AFB, NC (TDY January 2006 – May 2006, Director of Mobility Forces, Southwest Asia)
14. July 2006 – November 2007, Vice Commander, Eighteenth Air Force, Scott AFB, IL
15. November 2007 – February 2009, Director of Public Affairs, Office of the Secretary of the Air Force, the Pentagon, Washington, D.C.
16. February 2009 – December 2010, Vice Director for Strategic Plans and Policy, Joint Chiefs of Staff, the Pentagon, Washington, D.C.
17. December 2010 – August 2012, Commander, Air Force District of Washington, Andrews AFB, MD
18. August 2012 – May 2014, Commander, Eighteenth Air Force, Scott AFB, IL
19. May 2014 – August 2015, Commander, Air Mobility Command, Scott AFB, IL
20. August 2015 – August 2018, Commander, United States Transportation Command, Scott AFB, IL
21. 1 October 2018 – Retiring

== Effective dates of promotion ==
Promotions
Insignia	Rank	Date
	General	May 5, 2014
	Lieutenant General	August 6, 2012
	Major General	December 9, 2008
	Brigadier General	September 2, 2006
	Colonel	April, 2000
	Lieutenant Colonel	January 1, 1997
	Major	March 1, 1994
	Captain	July 13, 1986
	First Lieutenant	May 15, 1984
	Second Lieutenant	May 15, 1982

== Awards and decorations ==
McDew has been awarded the following decorations and awards:

Badges
Air Force Command Pilot Badge
Joint Chiefs of Staff Badge
United States Transportation Command Badge
Presidential Service Badge

Personal Decorations
Defense Distinguished Service Medal
Air Force Distinguished Service Medal with one bronze oak leaf cluster
Defense Superior Service Medal with one bronze oak leaf cluster
Legion of Merit with two bronze oak leaf clusters
Meritorious Service Medal with four bronze oak leaf clusters
Army Commendation Medal
Air Force Achievement Medal
Joint Meritorious Unit Award with two bronze oak leaf clusters
Air Force Outstanding Unit Award with two silver oak leaf clusters
Air Force Organizational Excellence Award with three bronze oak leaf clusters
Combat Readiness Medal with three bronze oak leaf clusters
National Defense Service Medal with one bronze service star
Armed Forces Expeditionary Medal
Kosovo Campaign Medal with one bronze service star
Global War on Terrorism Expeditionary Medal
Global War on Terrorism Service Medal
Armed Forces Service Medal
Nuclear Deterrence Operations Service Medal with oak leaf cluster
Air Force Expeditionary Service Ribbon with gold frame and one bronze oak leaf cluster
Air Force Longevity Service Award with one silver and three bronze oak leaf clusters
Small Arms Expert Marksmanship Ribbon
Air Force Training Ribbon

Military offices
Preceded by Mark F. Ramsay	Commander of Eighteenth Air Force; 2012–2014	Succeeded by Carlton D. Everhart II
Preceded by Paul J. Selva	Commander of Air Mobility Command; 2014–2015	Succeeded by Carlton D. Everhart II
Preceded by Paul J. Selva	Commander of United States Transportation Command; 2015–2018	Succeeded by Stephen R. Lyons
