= Sustainment Center of Excellence =

Coordinates: 37°14′28″N 77°20′45″W

U.S. Army Sustainment Center of Excellence
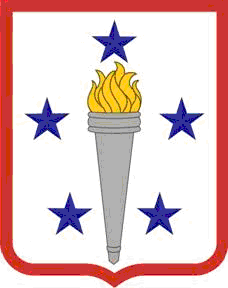
- Country: United States
- Allegiance: United States Army Transformation and Training Command
- Branch: United States Army
- Part of: U.S. Army Combined Arms Support Command
- Garrison/HQ: Fort Lee, Virginia
- Website: https://cascom.army.mil/

Commanders
- Current commander: MG Sean P. Davis

The U.S. Army Sustainment Center of Excellence (SCoE) [pronounced sko or sko-e] is a subordinate organization under the U.S. Army Combined Arms Support Command (CASCOM) at Fort Lee, Virginia. Its mission is to oversee and coordinate the functions of the 5 sustainment branches of the Army (Quartermaster Corps, Ordnance Corps, Transportation Corps, Adjutant General Corps, Finance Corps) and the Army Sustainment University. The CASCOM commander is dual-hatted as the commander of SCoE.

== TRADOC Centers of Excellence ==
TRADOC Centers of Excellence (CoEs) came about as a result of the 2005 Base Realignment and Closure (BRAC) Commission recommendation. According to the U.S. Army Training and Doctrine Command (TRADOC), a CoE is, "a premier organization that creates the highest standards of achievement in an assigned sphere of expertise by generating synergy through effective and efficient combination and integration of functions while reinforcing the unique requirements and capabilities of the branches". There are 10 Army Centers of Excellence subordinate to TRADOC, under which there are 32 Army schools. CoEs with a similar structure to SCoE are Fires CoE (Fort Sill, OK), Maneuver CoE (Fort Benning, GA) and Maneuver Support CoE (Fort Leonard Wood, MO).

== SCoE Headquarters Building ==
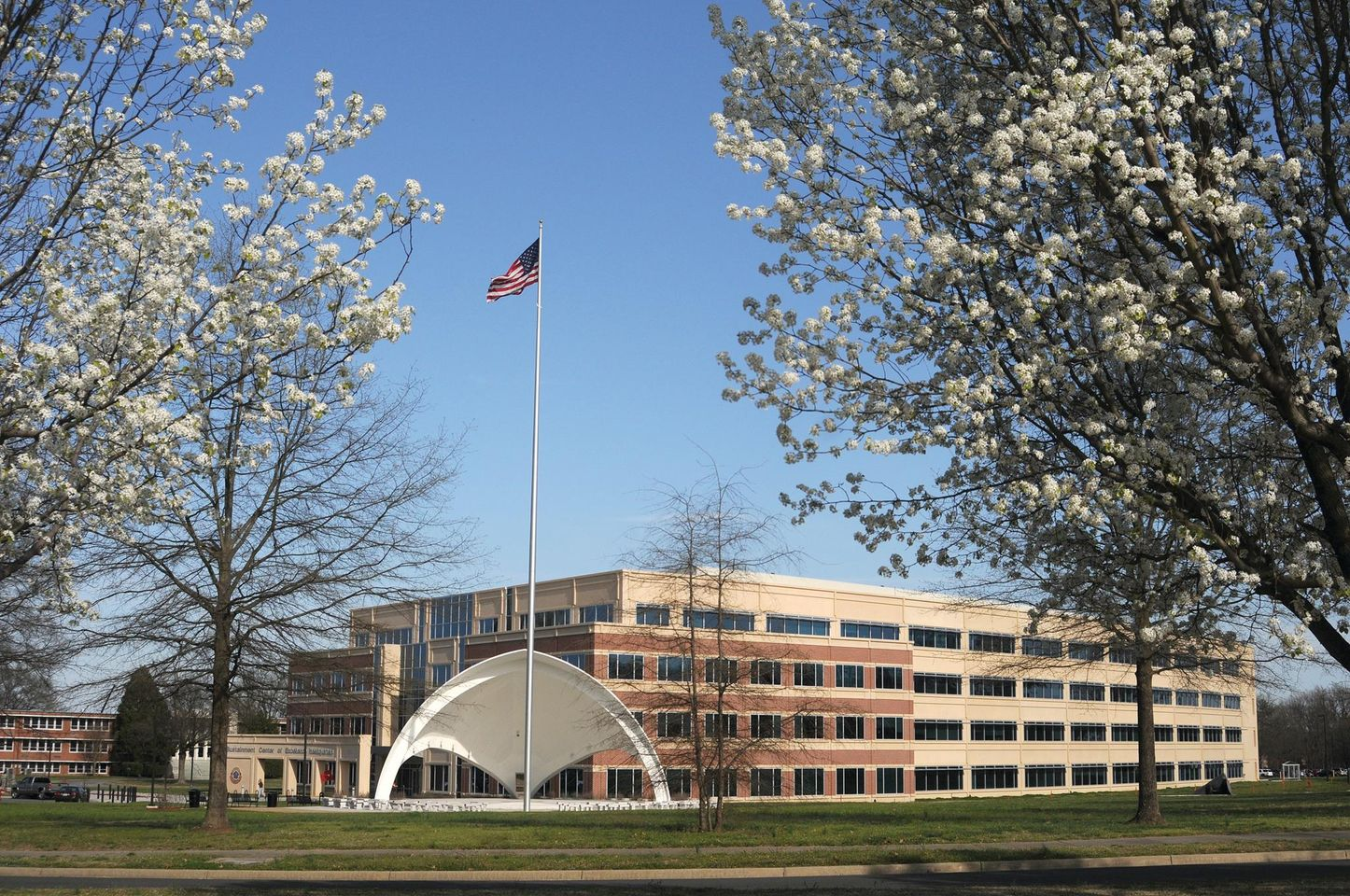
The new Mifflin Hall as the named building for the U.S. Army Sustainment Center of Excellence, circa 2010.

The $50 million SCoE headquarters building, completed in 2009, contains the headquarters for CASCOM, the Quartermaster Corps, the Ordnance Corps, and the Transportation Corps. On July 30, 2010, the SCoE building was dedicated as Mifflin Hall in honor of Major General Thomas Mifflin the first Quartermaster General. At the same time, the former Quartermaster School Headquarters was decommissioned as Mifflin Hall and demolished. As well, as a part of BRAC, the Ordnance Corps relocated from Aberdeen Proving Ground, MD and the Transportation Corps moved from Fort Eustis, VA.

The Finance Corps and Adjutant Generals Corps are headquartered at the U.S. Army Soldier Support Institute at Fort Jackson, South Carolina.

With the consequences of 2005 Base Realignment and Closure and the creation of SCoE, the Army Logistics Management College (ALMC) became the Army Logistics University (renamed Army Sustainment University in 2023) to represent its increased mission of Professional Military Education for Logistics Officers, newly commissioned Second Lieutenants, Warrant Officers, Non-commissioned Officers and Civilians for all the Army sustainment branches. It is located on a separate 36-acre (150,000 m^{2}) campus in a new $136 million building completed in 2009.

== SCoE Nation ==
The Sustainment Center of Excellence was sometimes unofficially referred to as the "SCoE Nation" by its military and civilian members during its early years. Its intended purposes was to create a new tradition that encourages a sense of belonging, of camaraderie and esprit de corps within the organization.

== Subordinate commands ==
- U.S. Army Ordnance Corps and the Ordnance School
- U.S. Army Quartermaster Corps and the Quartermaster School
- U.S. Army Transportation Corps and the Transportation School
- U.S. Army Soldier Support Institute Fort Jackson, South Carolina
  - U.S. Army Adjutant General Corps and Adjutant General School
  - U.S. Army Finance Corps and Financial Management School
- U.S. Army Sustainment University

== Commanders ==
- Major General James E. Chambers from 2008 to 11 June 2010
- Brigadier General Jesse Cross from 11 June 2010 to 9 September 2010
- Major General James L. Hodge from 9 September 2010 to 26 June 2012
- Major General Larry D. Wyche from 26 June 2012 to 22 August 2014
- Major General Stephen R. Lyons from 22 August 2014 to 7 August 2015
- Major General Darrell K. Williams from 7 August 2015 to 31 May 2017
- Major General Paul C. Hurley, Jr. from 31 May 2017 to 23 August 2018
- Brigadier General Douglas M. McBride Jr. interim commander 23 August 2018 to 17 September 2018
- Major General Rodney D. Fogg from 17 September 2018 to 9 July 2021
- Major General Mark T. Simerly from 9 July 2021 to 14 December 2023
- Major General Michelle K. Donahue from 14 December 2023 to 14 November 2025
- Major General Sean P. Davis from 14 November 2025 to present

== Insignia ==
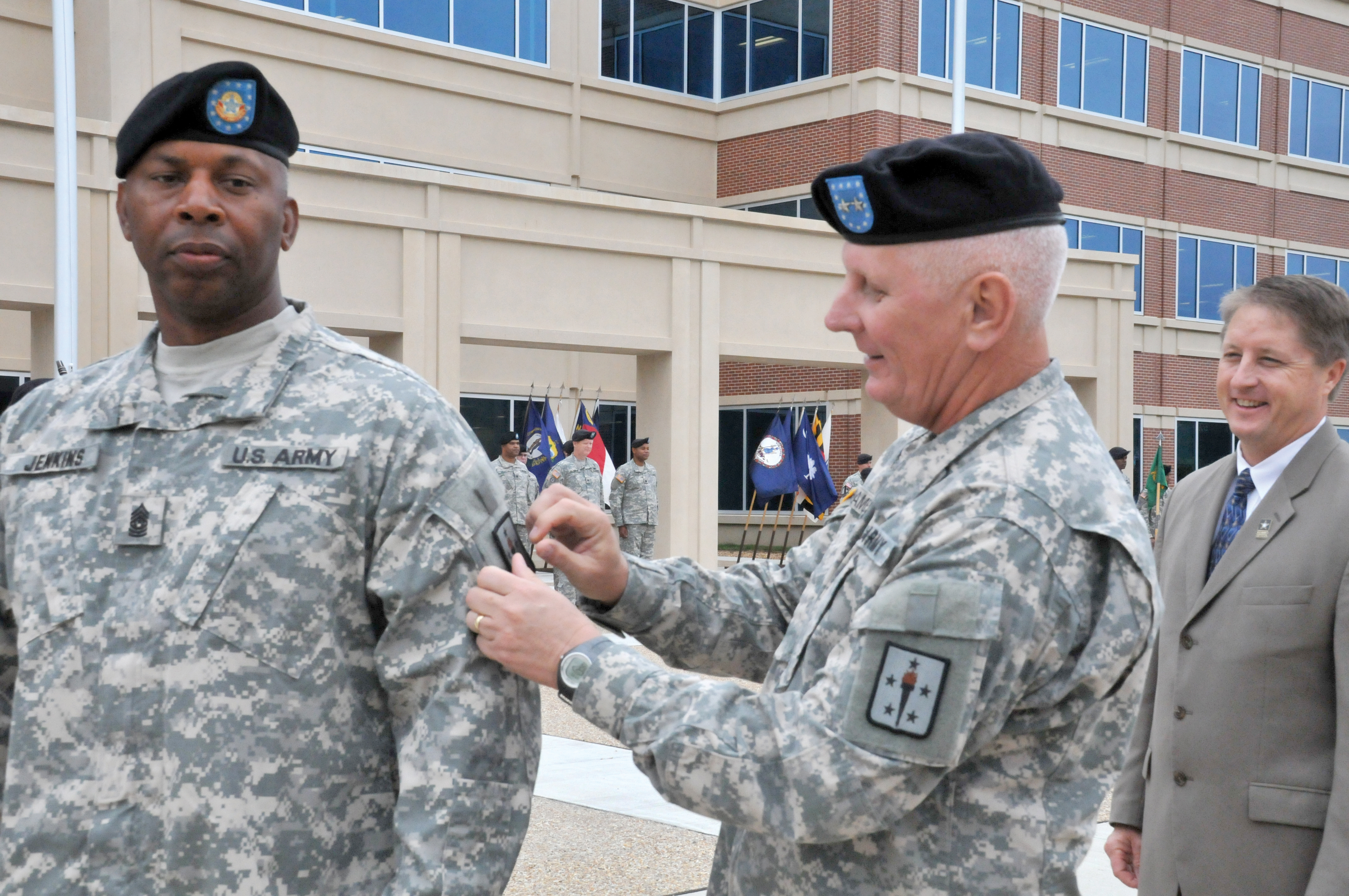
On Sept. 25, 2009, Maj. Gen. James E. Chamber, Combined Arms Support Command, SCoE and Fort Lee (renamed Fort Gregg-Adams) Commanding General, and Command Sgt. Maj. C.C. Jenkins, CASCOM, SCoE Command Sergeant Major, replaced their former CASCOM shoulder sleeve insignia patches for the newly designed insignia inclusive of all sustainment elements in the Army.

Shoulder Sleeve Insignia. Description: A shield-shaped embroidered item blazoned as follows: Argent, a torch of knowledge enflamed Or, the torch base Argent (Silver Gray), between five mullets Azure; all within a 1/8 inch (0.32 cm) red border. Overall dimensions are 2 3/8 inches (6.0 cm) in width by 3 inches (7.6 cm) in length.

Symbolism: Red, white, and blue are the national colors. The torch of knowledge symbolizes the training functions of the center to transform service members into proficient logistic leaders and soldiers. Gold/yellow denotes excellence. The five stars represent the five major elements of sustainment – maintenance, supply, transportation, human resources, and financial services.

The shoulder sleeve insignia was approved effective 1 January 2009, and was worn starting on 1 October 2009.
