= Darrell K. Williams =

American Army general, university president

Darrell Williams
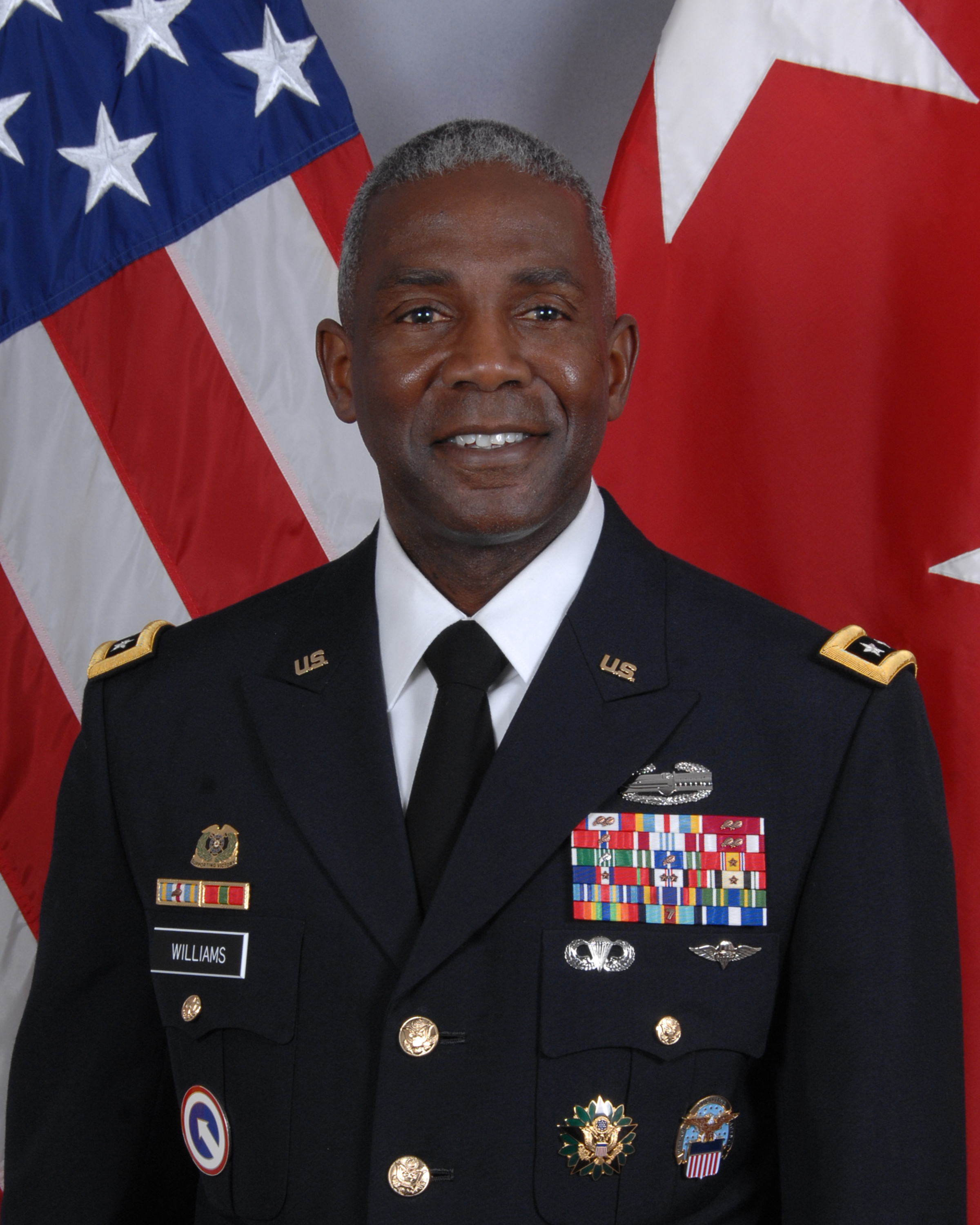

President of Hampton University
- Incumbent
- Assumed office July 1, 2022
- Preceded by: William R. Harvey

Personal details
- Born: West Palm Beach, Florida, U.S.
- Education: Hampton University (BA); United States Army Command and General Staff College (MMAS); National War College (MS); Pennsylvania State University, University Park (MBA)

Military service
- Allegiance: United States
- Branch/service: United States Army
- Years of service: 1983–2020
- Rank: Lieutenant General
- Commands: Defense Logistics Agency; 1st Theater Sustainment Command; Army Combined Arms Support Command

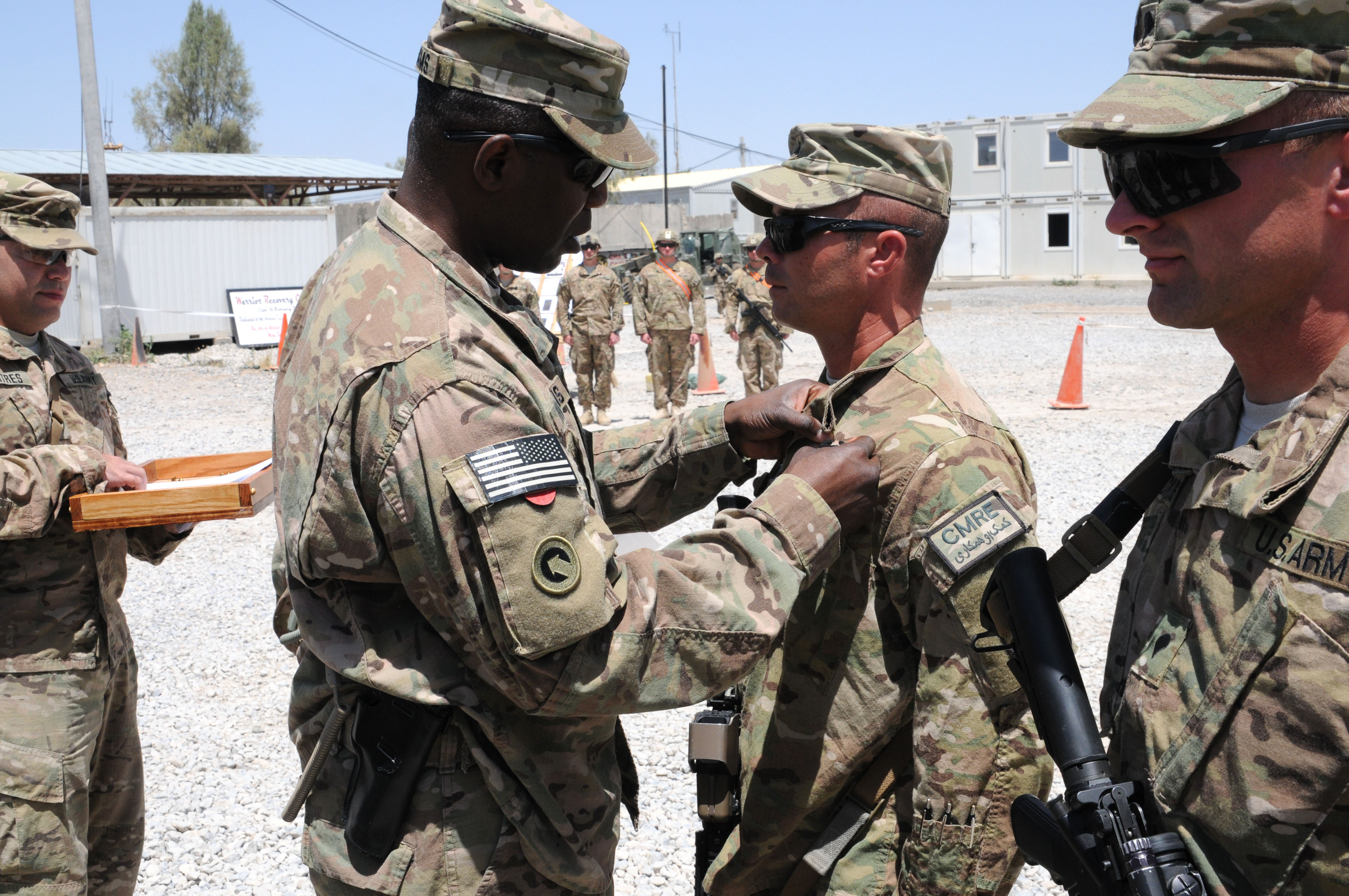
Major General Williams bestows a medal

Darrell Keith Williams is an American lieutenant general who has served as president of Hampton University since 2022. He previously served as a general officer in the United States Army directing the Defense Logistics Agency until July 8, 2020. He also headed the Combined Arms Support Command and Sustainment Center of Excellence and was the senior mission commander at Fort Gregg-Adams in Virginia.

Williams is the founding chair of the Mary S. Peake Fellowship, a one-year program for next-generation leaders helping local businesses grow, named in honor of Mary S. Peake.

== Early life ==
A native of West Palm Beach, Florida, Williams was commissioned into the Army Quartermaster Corps at Hampton Institute, Hampton, Virginia in 1983. He was a Distinguished Military Graduate and also earned a Bachelor of Arts degree in Psychology. He also became a member of Gamma Iota chapter of Alpha Phi Alpha fraternity.

== Education ==
His post graduate education includes: Master's degree in Military Arts and Sciences from the School of Advanced Military Studies of the United States Army Command and General Staff College, Fort Leavenworth, Kansas; Master's degree in National Security and Strategic Studies (Distinguished Graduate) from the National War College, Fort McNair, Washington D.C.; and master's degree in Business Management (Logistics) from the Pennsylvania State University, State College, PA in 1991.

== Military career ==
Williams has commanded logistics units at the company, battalion, brigade, and enterprise levels and has served in key staff positions at the tactical, operational/joint and strategic levels. His prior assignments include: Deputy Chief of Staff, U.S. Army Materiel Command (AMC), Redstone Arsenal, Alabama; Commander, Defense Logistics Agency (DLA) Land and Maritime in Columbus, Ohio; Director of Logistics, Engineering and Security Assistance, J-4, Headquarters, United States Pacific Command (USPACOM), Hawaii; Executive Officer to the Army Deputy Chief of Staff, G-4 (Army G-4); Brigade Commander, 3d Sustainment Brigade, Fort Stewart, Georgia; and Deputy C-4, Coalition Forces Land Component Command (CFLCC), Camp Arifjan, Kuwait during Operations Enduring (OEF), Iraqi Freedom (OIF).

Williams previously commanded the 1st Sustainment Command (Theater) where he was responsible for providing theater sustainment to Army forces and elements of the Joint Force throughout the U.S. Central Command (USCENTCOM) Area of Responsibility, to include Afghanistan and Iraq, under the mission command of U.S. Army Central (USARCENT).

== Awards and decorations ==
Combat Action Badge
Basic Parachutist Badge
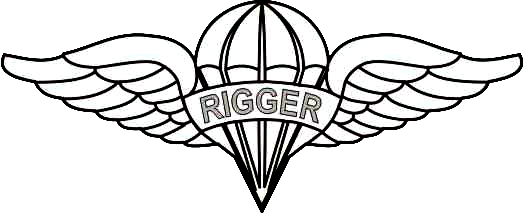
Parachute Rigger Badge
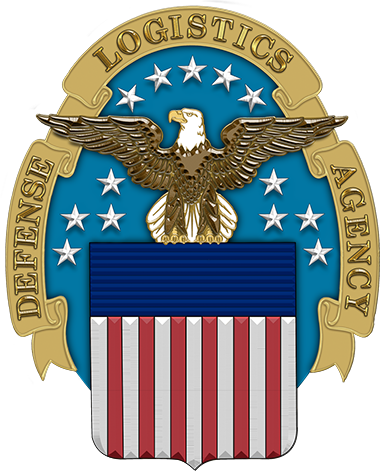
Defense Logistics Agency Badge
Army Staff Identification Badge
1st Sustainment Command (Theater) Combat Service Identification Badge
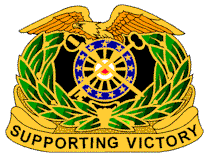
Quartermaster Corps Distinctive Unit Insignia
5 Overseas Service Bars

Army Distinguished Service Medal with two bronze oak leaf clusters
Defense Superior Service Medal
Legion of Merit with two oak leaf clusters
Bronze Star Medal with oak leaf cluster
Defense Meritorious Service Medal
Meritorious Service Medal with two oak leaf clusters
Army Commendation Medal with silver oak leaf cluster
Army Achievement Medal with oak leaf cluster
Joint Meritorious Unit Award with oak leaf cluster
Superior Unit Award
National Defense Service Medal with one bronze service star
Kosovo Campaign Medal with service star
Afghanistan Campaign Medal with two service stars
Iraq Campaign Medal with service star
Global War on Terrorism Expeditionary Medal
Global War on Terrorism Service Medal
Korea Defense Service Medal
Army Service Ribbon
Army Overseas Service Ribbon with bronze award numeral 7
NATO Medal for Kosovo
