= Human Dimension =

U.S. army initiative

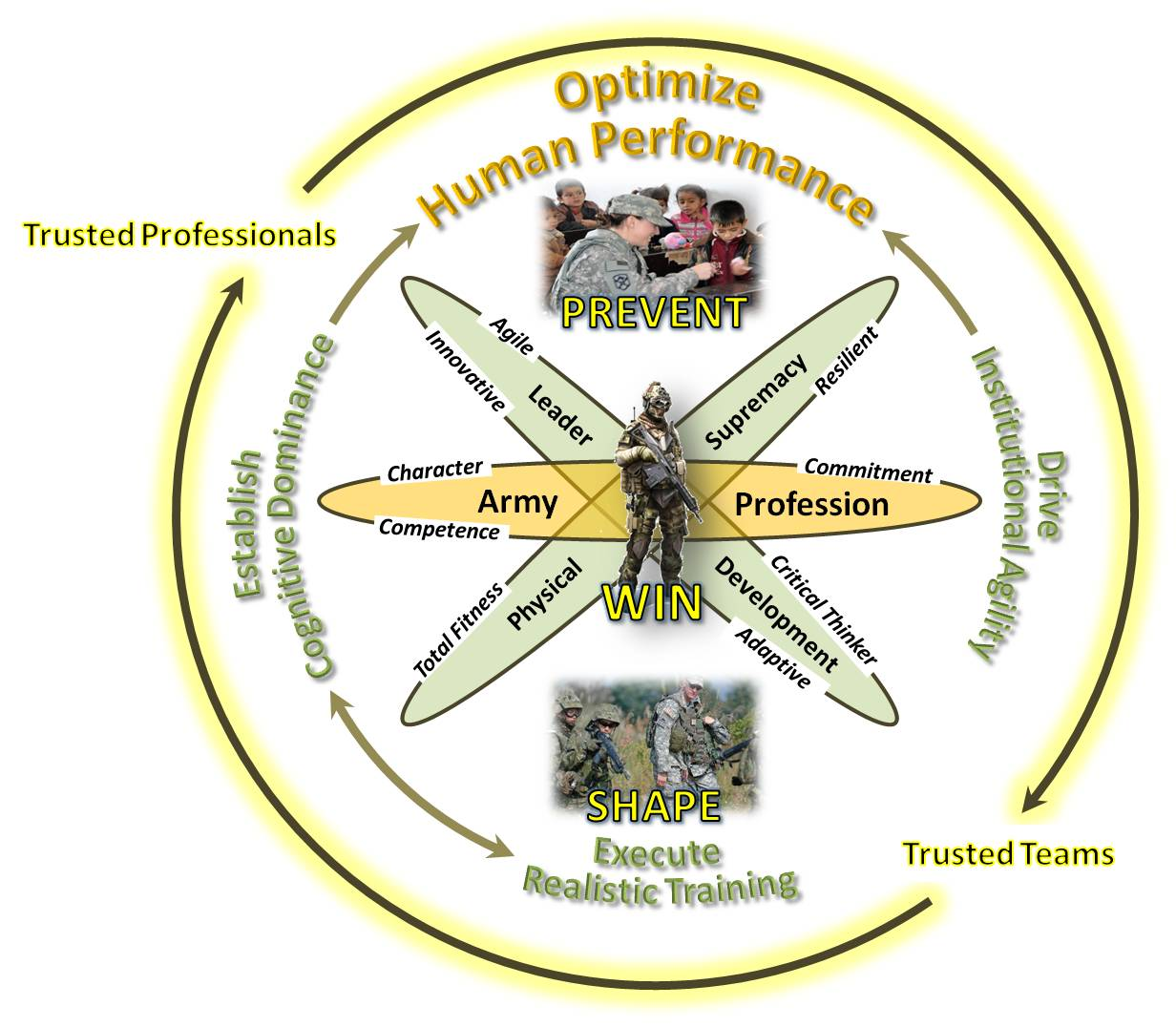

Human Dimension is a U.S. army framework to improve the cognitive, physical, and social components of military personnel
