= United States Army Financial Management School =

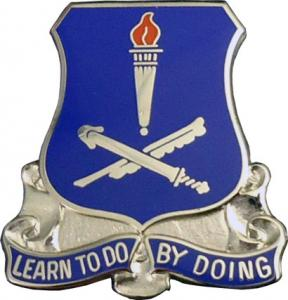
- Motto: Learn To Do By Doing
- Established: 1947

The United States Army Financial Management School is in Fort Jackson, South Carolina. Its mission is to provide the United States Army with military and civilian leaders trained in financial management, and develop complementary concepts, doctrine, and organization for financial management in support of American armed forces. Students take classes and train in subjects such as advanced accounting, financial analysis, accounts payable and disbursing operations, and auditing. While training, soldiers must still participate in physical training and testing.

== History ==
The Second Continental Congress appointed a Paymaster General of the Army on 16 June 1775, thereby creating a Pay Department consisting of finance soldiers that disbursed pay throughout the Continental Army. The Pay Department became a part of the Quartermaster Corps in 1912. In 1920 the U.S. Army Finance Corps became a separate army branch and at this point it became responsible for more than monthly pay as it took on all auditing and budgeting for the entire War Department.

In 2019, the name of the school was changed from Financial Management to Finance and Controller.

== Legislation ==
US Code Title 10 § 3022. Financial Management establishes: (a) The Secretary of the Army shall provide that the Assistant Secretary of the Army for Financial Management shall direct and manage financial management activities and operations of the Department of the Army, including ensuring that financial management systems of the Department of the Army comply with subsection (b). The authority of the Assistant Secretary for such direction and management shall include the authority to— (1) supervise and direct the preparation of budget estimates of the Department of the Army and otherwise carry out, with respect to the Department of the Army, the functions specified for the Under Secretary of Defense (Comptroller) in section 135 (c) of this title; (2) approve and supervise any project to design or enhance a financial management system for the Department of the Army; and (3) approve the establishment and supervise the operation of any asset management system of the Department of the Army, including— (A) systems for cash management, credit management, and debt collection; and (B) systems for the accounting for the quantity, location, and cost of property and inventory.
