= Soldier Support Institute =

U.S. Army organization

Coordinates: 34.0192°N 80.9237°W

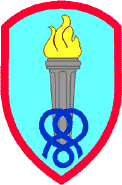
- Active: 1973-present
- Country: United States
- Branch: United States Army
- Part of: Sustainment Center of Excellence
- Garrison/HQ: Fort Jackson (South Carolina)

Commanders
- Current commander: Col. Joel Holmstrom
- Command Sergeant Major: CSM Monty Drummond

Insignia
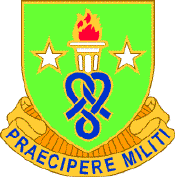
- Soldier Support Institute Distinctive Unit Insignia

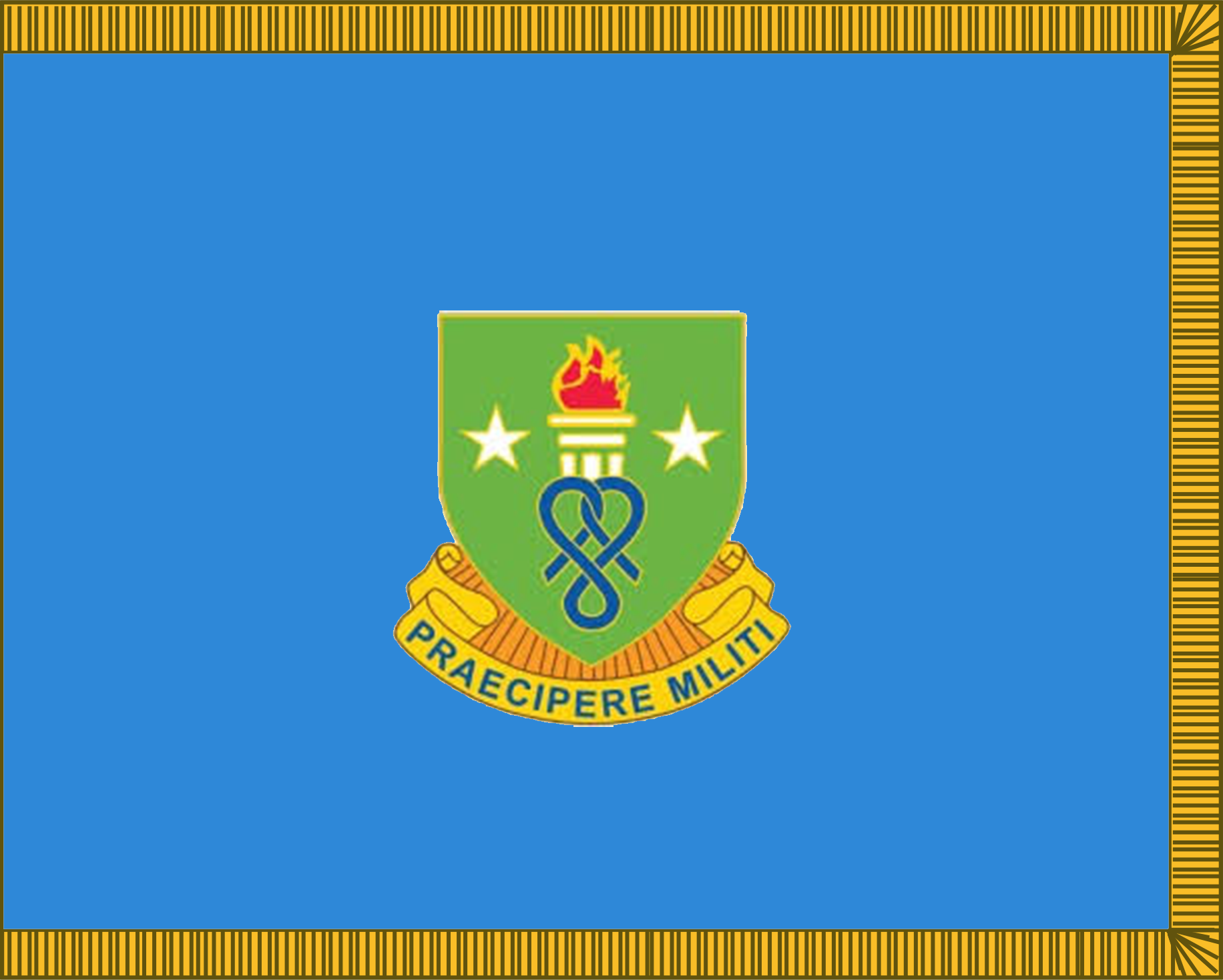
- Soldier Support Institute Flag

The Soldier Support Institute (SSI) at Fort Jackson, South Carolina, is a U.S. Army organization and major subordinate command of the Combined Arms Support Command and part of the Sustainment Center of Excellence (SCoE). It is also part of the United States Army Transformation and Training Command (T2COM).

== Mission ==
Train and educate soldiers and civilians in Financial Management, Human Resources Support, Music Support, Postal Operations, and Recruiting and Retention; develop complementary concepts, doctrine, organizations, and materiel to strengthen an all volunteer U.S. Army as America's force of decisive action.

== SSI organizations ==
The SSI consists of three major schools: Adjutant General, Financial Management, and the Recruiting and Retention Schools. It also includes the Noncommissioned Officer Academy, the 369th Adjutant General Battalion, and the Training Support Battalion.

The Adjutant General and Financial Management Schools are "home" to their respective Army branches, the Adjutant General's Corps and the Finance Corps. The two branch schools offer the Basic Officer Leadership Course for newly commissioned lieutenants and the Captain's Career Course for first lieutenants and captains in their third or fourth year of commissioned service. The School Commandants are the proponents for their branches and oversee the development of Doctrine, Organizations, Training, Leader Development, Materiel, and Personnel within their corps (Active and Reserve Components). The Soldier Support Institute's Concepts Development & Integration Directorate and Training Development Directorate assist the Commandants with these tasks. Both schools frequently assemble Mobile Training Teams (MTTs) to go to specific geographical regions to train soldiers.

The Adjutant General School also includes the Bands Program, and The Army School of Music (see United States Armed Forces School of Music) currently located at Joint Expeditionary Base Little Creek-Fort Story (JEBLCFS,) Virginia. The Interservice Postal School is also an element of the Adjutant General School which trains enlisted Soldiers and noncommissioned officers from all of America's military services in modern postal operations. The Adjutant General School also conducts Basic Warrant Officer and Advanced Warrant Officer courses within human resources management.

The Noncommissioned Officer Academy (NCOA) is located in Mabry Hall. The NCOA provides enlisted leadership training for Soldiers holding military occupational specialties in the human resource management, financial management, recruiting and retention, and religious support areas of Army operations.

The 369th Adjutant General Battalion conducts Advanced Individual Training (AIT) for the Army's Human Resources Specialists and Financial Management Technicians.

The Training Support Battalion consists of all Soldiers assigned to the SSI (except the 369th and NCO Academy). This organization also runs the Warrior Training Area which hosts the culminating exercise for all schools (except RRS) to apply classroom learning in a simulated operational environment. The Training Support Battalion also includes the International Student Office, which oversees the attendance of International Students to courses offered on Fort Jackson.

== Insignia ==
=== Shoulder sleeve insignia ===
Description – On a light blue shield arched convexly at top and edged with a 1/8 inch scarlet border, 3 inches in height overall, a gray torch inflamed yellow and surmounted in base with a dark blue cord intertwined as a heneage knot.

Symbolism – The torch is used to symbolize scholarship and leadership. The heneage knot is representative of the multiple training missions. Silver gray and golden yellow are the colors of the Finance Corps. Blue and scarlet are colors of the Adjutant General Corps. Light blue is the color used to represent Defense organizations and indicates the mission of the organization in training for all military services.

Background – The shoulder sleeve insignia was originally approved for the U.S. Army Administrative Schools Center on 10 January 1973. It was redesignated for the U.S. Army Administration Center on 10 December 1974; redesignated for the U.S. Army Soldier Support Center on 4 November 1980; and authorized for the U.S. Army Soldier Support Institute on 1 October 1994.

=== Distinctive unit insignia ===
Description – A gold-color, metal-and-enamel device 1 1/8 inches (3 cm) in height overall, consisting of a green-enamel shield bearing at center between two white-enamel, five-pointed stars, a white-enamel torch with flame of gold-and-scarlet enamel, and in front of the lower half of the torch a blue-enamel heneage knot with a small loop in base; below the shield a gold scroll bearing in blue-enamel letters, "PRAECIPERE MILITI" ("Teaching the Soldier").

Symbolism – The green background represents the green of the countryside near Fort Benjamin Harrison, Indiana, the original location of the organization. The torch and heneage knot are adapted from the shoulder-sleeve insignia of the original unit's parent organization at the time the insignia was adopted, the U.S. Army Administrative Schools Center. Gold and silver represent the enduring value of the knowledge imparted by the schools that comprise the institute. The two white stars are symbolic of guidance and leadership. The Latin motto means instructing or "Teaching the Soldier".

Background – The distinctive unit insignia was originally approved for the U.S. Army Institute of Administration (a subordinate element of the U.S. Army Administrative Schools Center) on 23 July 1973. It was redesignated for the U.S. Army Soldier Support Center effective on 3 June 1980, and redesignated for the U.S. Army Soldier Support Institute effective 1 October 1994.

=== Flag ===
Description – The organizational flag for the Soldier Support Institute is Teal Blue with a yellow fringe. The Soldier Support Institute device is centered on the flag.
