= Corps Support Group =

Unit in the United States Army

An America corps support marine talking to a South Korean supply officer

A Corps Support Group (CSG) was a brigade-sized unit in the United States Army. A CSG differs from a Division Support Command (DISCOM) in that it is a corps, not a divisional, asset. Doctrinally, a CSG serves corps units, not division units, but in practice CSGs typically have a close working relationship with a particular division especially in garrison. A CSG's subordinate units also may be parceled out to different commands in theater, thus their wartime organization will normally significantly differ from their garrison organization.

Typically, a CSG and its subordinate units would only deploy as far forward as the Division Support Area. A typical CSG would include a Headquarters Company and a varying number of Corps Support Battalions (CSBs) which may or may not be from the same Fort as the headquarters. The CSG was normally responsible for reinforcing the logistics units of a Division while primarily supporting the non-divisional units such as Corps Artillery, Corps Military Police, and other higher echelon units.

The US Army reorganized many CSGs into Sustainment Brigades while Corps Support Battalions are becoming Combat Sustainment Support Battalions (CSSBs). Three of the Corps Support Groups are stationed at Fort Liberty, NC as part of the XVIII Airborne Corps.

In certain circumstances, Area Support Groups may carry out the same functions:

The 300th Area Support Group, 13th Corps Support Command and the 122nd Corps Support Group, 1st Corps Support Command conducted a transfer of authority ceremony Dec. 19 on the grounds of the Ziggurat of Ur. The 300th ASG, a Reserve unit from Fort Lee, Va. was mobilized and deployed December 15, 2003 for Operation Iraqi Freedom. During their tenure they provided direct support supply, transportation, and maintenance support to three U.S. divisions, a multi-national division, an armored cavalry division and a Marine expeditionary unit.

On 7 September 2008, the 300th Area Support Group cased its colors in a ceremony in Mifflin Hall at Fort Lee (Virginia) as part of its inactivation. The 300th ASG was organized in November 1971. It traces its history many years before to the 5435th Quartermaster Training Brigade. It served as a multi-functional headquarters for units conducting support exercises, training, and operations. Elements were deployed with the I-FOR NATO peacekeeping force in Bosnia-Herzegovina in 1996. Soldiers from this unit volunteered to deploy for Operation Desert Storm in 1991, and the entire unit deployed in January 2004 to Iraq.

There are also a large number of Regional Support Groups, for example the 42nd Regional Support Group and the 206th Regional Support Group of the Reserve Engineer Command.

== List of Corps Support Groups ==
Unit	Component	Supported Unit	Location	Notes
7th Corps Support Group	Active Army	VII Corps	Crailsheim, Germany	
16th Support Group	Active Army	V Corps	Hanau, Germany	Now the 16th Sustainment Brigade
24th Corps Support Group	Active Army		Fort Stewart	
30th Corps Support Group	NC ARNG		Durham, North Carolina	
40th Corps Support Group	CA ARNG		Long Beach, California	
43rd Corps Support Group	Active Army		Fort Carson	43rd Sustainment Brigade from 2015.
45th Corps Support Group	Active Army		Schofield Barracks	
46th Corps Support Group	Active Army	XVIII Airborne Corps	Fort Bragg	
64th Corps Support Group	Active Army	III Corps	Fort Hood	
67th Support Group	National Guard	-	Lincoln, Neb.	2003-2008, now the 67th Maneuver Enhancement Brigade
101st Corps Support Group	Active Army	XVIII Airborne Corps	Fort Campbell	
122nd Corps Support Group (122nd CSG)	National Guard - Alabama		Selma, Alabama	Served in Iraq 2005
159th Corps Support Group	National Guard - Montana		Helena, Montana	
164th Corps Support Group	Army Reserve		Mesa, Arizona	
167th Corps Support Group	Army Reserve		Londonderry, New Hampshire	Lineage at
171st Corps Support Group	Army Reserve		Garner, North Carolina	
172nd Corps Support Group	Army Reserve		Broken Arrow, Oklahoma	
363rd Corps Support Group	Army Reserve		San Marcos, Texas	
371st Corps Support Group	National Guard - Ohio		Kettering, Ohio	Became 371st Sustainment Brigade
501st Support Group	Active Army		Republic of Korea	Became 501st Sustainment Brigade, 2006
507th Corps Support Group	Active Army	XVIII Airborne Corps	Fort Bragg	
561st Corps Support Group (561st CSG)	Army Reserve		Omaha, Nebraska	
593rd Corps Support Group	Active Army	I Corps	Fort Lewis	
917th Corps Support Group (917th CSG)	Army Reserve		Belton, Missouri	
