= 13th Armored Corps Sustainment Command =

Modular sustainment command of the III Armored Corps, US Army

- 13th ACSC shoulder sleeve insignia
- Active: 1965 – present
- Country: United States
- Branch: United States Army
- Type: Corps Sustainment Command
- Size: 6,000 Soldiers
- Part of: III Armored Corps
- Garrison/HQ: Fort Hood
- Nickname: "Lucky 13th"
- Motto: Service to the Soldier
- Engagements: Operation Iraqi Freedom; *Transition of Iraq; *Iraqi Governance; *National Resolution; Iraqi Surge; Iraqi Sovereignty; Operation Enduring Freedom
- Decorations: Superior Unit Award

Commanders
- Current commander: COL LaHavie J. Brunson
- Colonel of the Regiment: MG (RET) Rodney D. Fogg
- Notable commanders: Johnnie E. Wilson; Billy K. Solomon; Terence Hildner

Insignia
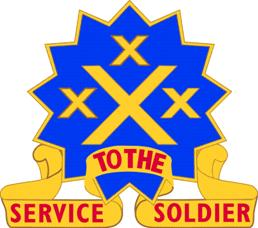
- Distinctive unit insignia

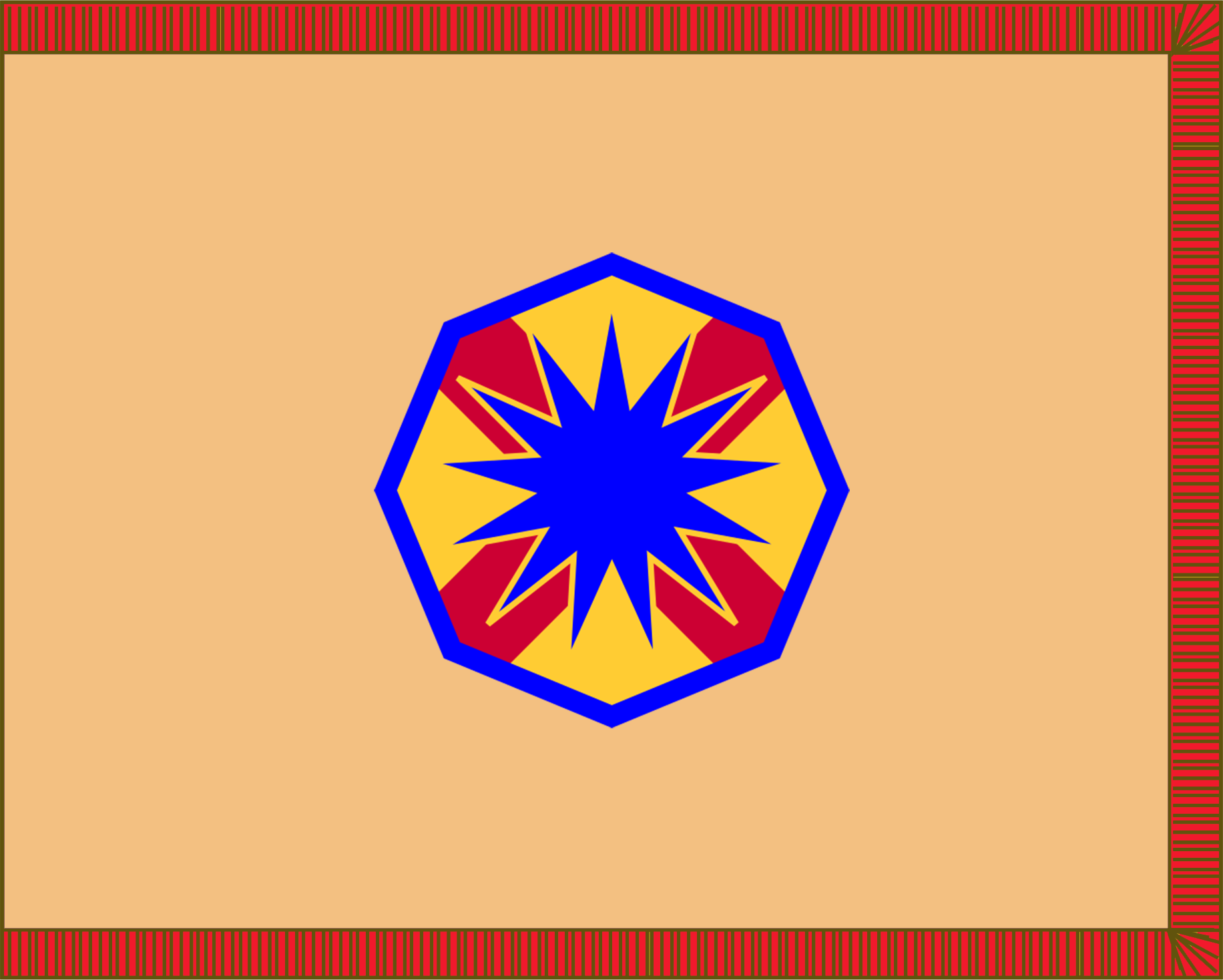
- 13th Sustainment Command Flag

The 13th Armored Corps Sustainment Command (13 ACSC)—the "Lucky 13th"—is a U.S. Army modular sustainment command which serves as a forward presence for expeditionary operations for a theater, or in support of a regional combatant commander. Corps Sustainment Commands (CSC), such as the 13th, synchronize distribution of supplies and services within their operational areas and provides distribution oversight. Formed at Fort Hood, Texas when the 1st Logistics Command deployed to Vietnam, the organization then known as the 13th Support Brigade was initially responsible for the training of technical services units to assume combat service support missions in Southeast Asia.

As the Army redefined the missions of its logistics forces in response to building towards a 16-division Army, it was designated a corps support command (COSCOM). In 1992, the 13th COSCOM deployed to Somalia as part of Operation Restore Hope where for the first time a COSCOM was given the mission to provide theater-level support in a major U.S. operation. The 13th ACSC has deployed to Iraq, Afghanistan, and Kuwait, and served as the logistics command for hurricane relief efforts in support of the American people after hurricanes Hurricane Katrina and Hurricane Rita devastated the Gulf Coast.

== History ==
The 13th Armored Corps Sustainment Command was constituted on 11 August 1965 in the Regular Army, and activated 24 September 1965 at Fort Hood, Texas as the 13th Support Brigade. The 13th Support Brigade was formed as the nation's involvement in Vietnam increased, and was tasked with the training of technical services units to assume combat service support missions in Southeast Asia. With reorganization from the "technical service" concept to the "combat service to the Army" concept, functional training of units was decentralized in the Continental Army Command to post, camp and station level.

The command continued to evolve due to increased missions and changing roles. Along with similar units, it was redesignated as 13th Corps Support Command (COSCOM) on 21 June 1975, and then the 13th Support Command (Corps) on 16 October 1980. As part of Army Transformation, it was reflagged to its current configuration as the 13th Sustainment Command (Expeditionary) during a formal ceremony on 23 February 2006.

=== Earthquake Relief, Nicaragua 1972 ===
Soldiers of the 13th ACSC first deployed as the 13th Support Brigade in response to the Managua earthquake, where its soldiers served at Camp Christine, Managua, Nicaragua, assisting in disaster relief from 23 December 1972 to 19 January 1973. Units of the 13th deployed in Nicaragua included:

- 21st Evacuation Hospital
- 255th Medical Detachment
- 528th Transportation Company (-)

=== Gulf War 1990-1991 ===
Though the headquarters did not deploy to Desert Shield and Desert Storm, units from the 13th COSCOM began to deploy in the fall of 1990 to Saudi Arabia to provide combat support and combat service support during the Gulf War. During Operation Desert Calm and Operation Provide Comfort, soldiers of the 13th ESC deployed to the Persian Gulf area. In 1992, 13th COSCOM soldiers deployed to Cuba to aid Haitian refugees during Operation Safe Harbor, and later assisted victims of Hurricane Andrew in Florida. 13th ESC soldiers led the way as III Corps units deployed to Kuwait to train and ensure the peace in support of Operation Intrinsic Action.

=== Somalia 1990s ===
In 1992, the United States Central Command established the Unified Task Force Somalia (UNITAF) in light of the worsening situation in Somalia. The command was called to deploy forces. 13th COSCOM Commander Brig. Gen. Billy K. Solomon deployed along with a portion of the 13th COSCOM headquarters to Mogadishu to serve as the nucleus of Joint Task Force Support Command, the first time where a COSCOM was given the mission to provide theater-level support. Soldiers of the Lucky 13th returned in May 1993.

Their major units included:

593rd Corps Support Group (Fort Lewis)
36th Engineer Group (Fort Benning)
7th Transportation Group (Fort Eustis)
62nd Medical Group (Fort Lewis)

=== Kuwait and humanitarian operations ===
From October through December 1994, 13th COSCOM soldiers provided multifunctional logistical support to Army forces supporting Operation Vigilant Warrior in Kuwait. Units of the 13th COSCOM conducted humanitarian and/or peacekeeping missions in Cuba as part of Operation Sea Signal V, Haiti Operation Uphold Democracy, Joint Task Force Bravo in Honduras, Operation Strong Support, and were a part of Stabilization Force (SFOR) 6 in Bosnia and Herzegovina. The 13th COSCOM also deployed their engineers to Thule Air Base, Greenland, for additional support missions.

Soldiers from the command have assisted in removing snow in Massachusetts, aiding flood victims in Louisiana, processing refugees in Arkansas, fighting forest fires in Montana, assisting earthquake victims in Mexico or helping flood victims in Curio, Texas.

Following the attacks on the World Trade Center and The Pentagon, elements of the 13th COSCOM supported Operation Enduring Freedom in Afghanistan.

=== Iraq War (U.S. phase 2003-2010) ===
The Iraq War again saw 13th COSCOM units deployed, including 64th Corps Support Group, directly supporting the 4th Infantry Division. Elements of the 49th Movement Control Battalion have been continuously deployed in the region since 1997 and remain a critical node supporting all U.S. and coalition forces.

13th COSCOM first deployed a medical evacuation headquarters and an air evacuation company on 12 February 2003, to Kuwait. Those units were to reposition forces as required to support the president's global war on terrorism. Eventually, the 13th COSCOM deployed both of its local Brigades in support of Operation Iraqi Freedom while the headquarters and separate units supported the families at Fort Hood, Texas.

In August 2003 deployment notification came for the soldiers of the 13th COSCOM headquarters to participate in the ongoing operations in Iraq. In preparation for its first major deployment since Somalia, the 13th COSCOM colors were cased in a deployment and retreat ceremony held on the afternoon of 18 December 2004, at Sadowski Field on Fort Hood.

==== OIF II Rotation ====
Campaign: Transition of Iraq - 2 May 2003 to 28 June 2004 Campaign: Iraqi Governance - 29 June 2004 to 15 December 2005

On 31 January 2004, the 13th COSCOM completed a transfer of authority with the 3rd Corps Support Command (COSCOM) at Logistics Support Area (LSA) Anaconda in Balad, Iraq, and assumed responsibility to provide logistics support to Combined Joint Task Force 7 in Iraq, later redesignated as the Multi-National Corps Iraq (MNC-I).

Major units serving with the 13th COSCOM for OIF II were:

- Corps Distribution Command (Provisional)
- 172nd Corps Support Group (Broken Arrow, Oklahoma)
- 1st Brigade, 82nd Airborne Division(-) (January–April 2004) (Fort Bragg, North Carolina)
- 81st BCT(-) (April–December 2004) (WAARNG)
- 593rd Corps Support Group (Fort Lewis, Washington)
- 167th Corps Support Group (Londonderry, New Hampshire)
- 300th Area Support Group, Army Reserve (Fort Lee (Virginia))
- 362nd Military Police Detachment (Ashley, Pennsylvania)
- 2632nd AEFTC Air Force transportation company(Joint Air force command of vehicle ops 2t1x1)

On 12 December 2004, the 13th COSCOM transferred authority to the 1st Corps Support Command. During its time at LSA Anaconda, the 13th COSCOM processed 2,000 tons of mail; averaged over 200 convoys a day for a total of 62,000 convoys involving 750,000 vehicles; and was responsible for quality of life improvements for the joint forces. The 13th COSCOM uncased its colors, signifying its return home and the end of its mission, at Fort Hood, Texas, on 21 January 2005.

==== OIF 06-08 Rotation ====
Campaign: National Resolution - 16 December 2005 to 9 January 2007 Campaign: Iraqi Surge – 10 January 2007 to 31 December 2008

The 13th, under its new designation as a sustainment command (expeditionary) deployed once again to Logistics Support Area Anaconda in August, 2006. The command provided logistics oversight for the entire Iraq theater, and assumed command and control of seven subordinate brigades, which included:

- 1st Brigade Combat Team, 34th Infantry Division
- 593rd Sustainment Brigade
- 82nd Sustainment Brigade
- 15th Sustainment Brigade
- 45th Sustainment Brigade
- 164th Corps Support Group
- 657th Area Support Group
- 81st HBCT
- 4th Sustainment Brigade
- 507th Corps Support Group

During OIF 06–08, the 13th ESC provided key logistical support to the Iraq War troop surge of 2007, and facilitated the movement and training of the additional 20,000 troops through Camp Buehring, Kuwait. The 13th ESC redeployed to Fort Hood in August, 2007, and quickly started training and preparations for their deployment in support of OIF 09–11.

==== OIF 09-11 Rotation ====
Campaign: Iraqi Sovereignty – 1 January 2009 to 31 August 2010

The command headquarters again deployed to the former LSA Anaconda, now under Air Force control under the redesignation of Joint Base Balad on 17 July 2009, and assumed the mission for theater logistics on 7 August. The 13th ESC was faced with the largest movement of American forces and military equipment in more than 40 years to facilitate a responsible withdrawal from the Iraq theater of operation. Over the course of a year-long deployment, the 13th ESC brought more than $1 billion worth of equipment back into the U.S. Army supply system.

During an average day for the 13th ESC in OIF 09–11, they issued 96,000 cases of bottled water, 1.6 million US gallons (6,100 m^{3}) of fuel, and delivered 137 tons of mail.

Some of the major accomplishments of the 13th ESC during OIF 09-11 included: signing a $31 million contract with a local Iraqi company to conduct container repair, opening the first Iraqi bank on Joint Base Balad, partnering with the Iraqi transportation network to get American trucks off the road, and Operation Clean Sweep, a comprehensive effort to reduce excess throughout the entire area of operation.

Six soldiers in the command were killed in OIF 09-11: PFC Taylor Marks, SGT Earl Werner, SPC Paul Andersen, SPC Joseph Gallegos, SGT William Spencer and MAJ Ronald Culver.

- 15th Sustainment Brigade - TX
- 36th Sustainment Brigade - Texas Army National Guard
- 256th Infantry Brigade Combat Team - Louisiana Army National Guard
- 278th Armored Cavalry Regiment - TN
- 155 Heavy Brigade Combat Team - Mississippi
- 41st Infantry Brigade Combat Team - Oregon Army Nation Guard
- 321st Sustainment Brigade - Louisiana
- 287th Sustainment Brigade - Kansas
- 304th Sustainment Brigade - California
- 96th Sustainment Brigade - Utah
- 90th Sustainment Brigade - Arkansas
- 3rd Sustainment Brigade - Georgia
- 10th Sustainment Brigade - New York
- 16th Sustainment Brigade - Germany
- 224th Sustainment Brigade - California

=== Hurricane Katrina ===
Deep in the process of deploying and redeploying 13th COSCOM units, key elements of 13th COSCOM supported Joint Task Force Katrina/Rita hurricane relief efforts in the summer of 2005. 13th COSCOM provided 100 million rations, collected human remains with dignity, executed emergency engineering operations, transported, distributed and stored over one billion dollars in humanitarian relief from both non-governmental and federal sources from across the nation.

Numbering nearly 1,000 soldiers at the height of operations, the command and staff of the 13th COSCOM formed Logistics Task Force Lonestar, composed of several different units from the support command. Soldiers representing transportation companies, medical and engineer units, maintenance groups and others worked to bring stability back to the storm-ravaged city of New Orleans and, after Hurricane Rita came ashore, close to Lake Charles, La.

With a humanitarian support mission for the people of New Orleans, the task force performed logistical missions from purifying water to providing engineer support to help clean up the streets in support of the Federal Emergency Management Agency and Joint Task Force Katrina. Working in sometimes difficult conditions, the task force was able to accomplish many tasks during their deployment including offering remedies to supply flow issues and establishing a donation distribution warehouse.

- HHC, 13th COSCOM
- Special Troops Battalion
- 49th Transportation Battalion
- 4th Corps Material Management Center

=== Afghanistan 2011-2012 ===
In December 2011, the 13th ESC command group and portions of the headquarters company deployed to Afghanistan as augmentees to the NATO Training Mission - Afghanistan. Upon arrival, deployed members of the unit integrated into the Deputy Command of Support Operations and served both in the headquarters of the directorate at Camp Eggers in Kabul, as well as in all five regional support commands across the country, conducting logistics training and mentoring of Afghan partners. On 4 February 2012, BG Terence Hildner, Commander 13th ESC died of natural causes in Afghanistan.

=== Kuwait 2014 ===
In December 2014, the 13th ESC headquarters deployed to Camp Arifjan, Kuwait, to assume the role as the Operational Command Post for the 1st Theater Sustainment Command, with the mission to provide Theater Sustainment Mission Command to Army, Joint, and Multinational Forces in the USCENTCOM Area of Responsibility, enabling Unified Land Operations and Theater Security Cooperation. The 13th ESC supported Operations Inherent Resolve (Iraq), Freedom Sentinel (Afghanistan), Spartan Shield (Kuwait), provided logistics and sustainment support and oversight to the Multinational Forces and Observer mission - Task Force Sinai, supported USCENTCOM forward elements in Jordan, and worked in cooperation with Combined Joint Interagency Task Force - Syria (CJIATF-S) to provide support to moderate Syrian opposition forces in the fight against the Islamic State of Iraq and Syria.

=== Operation Spartan Shield ===
Redesignated as the 13th Armored Corps Sustainment Command (ACSC), the ACSC Headquarters deployed in August 2023 in support of Operation Spartan Shield. The unit redeployed to Fort Hood, Texas, in May 2024.

== Current Activities ==
At Fort Hood, the 13th ACSC remains always ready to deploy with no notice/short notice to support efforts around the world. Currently the 13th has the following missions:

- Providing command and control of all assigned and attached units.
- Providing Combat Service Support to Fort Hood units through:
- Direct Support Maintenance to non-divisional units
- General Support maintenance and back up direct support maintenance to the 1st Cavalry Division
- Support to additional installation activities and functions, as directed.

=== LSOC-West ===
Leveraging Sustainment Organizations in CONUS West duties involve coordination with all Sustainment Brigades, Support Brigades, and Army Field Support Brigades in the Continental United States, West of the Mississippi river.

These brigades are:

- 1st Sustainment Brigade – Fort Riley, Kansas
- 4th Sustainment Brigade – Fort Carson, Colorado
- 15th Sustainment Brigade – Fort Bliss, Texas
- 36th Sustainment Brigade – Texas National Guard
- 43rd Sustainment Brigade – Fort Carson, Colorado
- 593rd Sustainment Brigade – Joint Base Lewis-McChord
- 916th Support Brigade – Fort Irwin, California
- 404th Army Field Support Brigade – Joint Base Lewis-McChord
- 407th Army Field Support Brigade – Fort Hood, Texas

=== Current leadership ===
- Commanding General COL LaHavie J. Brunson
- Command Sergeant Major CSM Amador Aguillen Jr.

=== Organization ===
Currently, the 13th ACSC is Fort Hood's third largest unit with a local strength of almost 6,000 Soldiers. It is composed of three battalions:

- 15th Corps Finance Battalion
- 49th Transportation Battalion (Movement Control)
- 61st Quartermaster Battalion

== Insignia ==
The distinctive unit insignia was originally approved for the 13th Support Brigade on 25 August 1966. It was redesignated for the 13th Corps Support Command and amended to revise the symbolism effective 21 June 1975. The insignia was redesignated for the 13th Support Command on 17 October 1980. It was redesignated for the 13th Corps Support Command on 10 August 1989. The insignia was redesignated for the 13th Sustainment Command on 7 March 2006.

=== Description/Blazon ===
A gold color metal and enamel insignia 1 1/8 inches (2.9 cm) in height overall consisting of a blue star of thirteen points, one point up, bearing a gold saltire between three smaller gold saltires, all above a gold scroll, the middle section surmounting the star, inscribed "SERVICE TO THE SOLDIER" in red letters.

=== Symbolism ===
The star of thirteen points refers to the unit's numerical designation. The central saltire stands for the command and the three smaller saltires for the Corps which it supports. The colors gold (for buff), red and blue are used in the flags of combat service support units. They refer to the supply and service, maintenance, transportation and other support functions of the command.

== Shoulder Sleeve Insignia (Patch) ==
The shoulder sleeve insignia was originally approved for the 13th Support Brigade on 11 August 1966. It was redesignated for the 13th Corps Support Command and amended to revise the symbolism effective 21 June 1975. The insignia was redesignated for the 13th Support Command on 17 October 1980. It was redesignated for the 13th Corps Support Command on 10 August 1989. The insignia was redesignated for the 13th Sustainment Command on 7 March 2006.

=== Description/Blazon ===
On a yellow octagon with a 1/8 inch (0.32 cm) blue border 2 1/2 inches (6.4 cm) in height overall, a scarlet saltire throughout surmounted by a blue star of thirteen points fimbriated in yellow.

=== Symbolism ===
The octagon reinforced by the saltire refers to the unit's mission of supporting the combat, combat support and combat service support organizations of the Corps. The star symbolizes the many far reaching missions of the command, and having thirteen points, the star also alludes to its numerical designation. The octagon is a symbol of regeneration; it alludes to the combat service support functions of the unit as consistently renewing the strength and vigor of the Corps.

Yellow (substituted for Quartermaster buff) alludes to the supply and service functions of the command. Scarlet (substituted for Ordnance crimson and Transportation brick red) alludes to the maintenance and transportation functions of the command. The blue represents other support rendered by the command. This combination identifies the colors which are used in the flags of combat service support organizations.

== Previous leaders ==
=== Former commanders ===
1. COL Orval Q. Matteson
2. COL Paul F. Roberts
3. COL Thomas E. Wesson
4. COL Chris W. Stevens
5. COL (MG) William T. McLean
6. COL Donald C. Poorman
7. COL (MG) Leo A. Brooks Sr.
8. COL Tipton
9. COL (BG) William Fedorochko
10. COL (GEN) Johnnie E. Wilson
11. COL Brown
12. COL Stirling
13. BG (LTG) Billy K. Solomon (Jan 1992 - Jun 1993)
14. BG (LTG) Charles S. Mahan Jr. (Jun 1993 - Jun 1995)
15. BG Thomas R. Dickinson (Jun 1995 - Jun 1997)
16. BG (LTG) Richard A. Hack (Jun 1997 - Jun 1999)
17. BG (MG) Jeanette K. Edmunds (Jun 1999 - Jul 2001)
18. BG (MG) William M. Lenaers (Jul 2001 - Jul 2003)
19. BG (MG) James E. Chambers (Jul 2003 - Jun 2005)
20. BG (MG) Michael J. Terry (Jun 2005 - Sep 2007)
21. BG Paul L. Wentz (Sep 2007 - Aug 2010)
22. BG Terence Hildner (Aug 2010 - died 3 Feb 2012)
23. BG (MG) Clark W. LeMasters Jr. (Apr 2012 - Jul 2014)
24. BG (MG) Rodney D. Fogg (Jul 2014 - Jun 2016)
25. BG Douglas M. McBride Jr. (Jun 2016 - May 2018)
26. BG (MG) Darren L. Werner (May 2018 - Jun 2020)
27. BG (MG) Ronald R. Ragin (Jun 2020 - Jul 2022)
28. BG (MG) Sean P. Davis (Jul 2022 - Jul 2024)
29. BG Sean P. Kelly (Jul 2024 - Jun 2025)

=== Former sergeants major ===
1. SGM Joseph Cocharan
2. SGM John Mitchell
3. SGM Paul Quesenberry
4. CSM Thomas J. Carruthers
5. CSM George W. Layne
6. CSM Louis Robison
7. CSM Donald Horn
8. CSM Joseph R. Bufford Jr.
9. CSM Robert Sullivan
10. CSM Pollan
11. CSM Emmett Maylone
12. CSM Donald W. Tucker
13. CSM Joshua Hooper
14. CSM Timothy O. Bowers
15. CSM Daniel K. Elder
16. CSM Terry Fountain
17. CSM Mark D. Joseph
18. CSM Terry Parham
19. CSM Terry Burton
20. CSM Marco A. Torres
21. CSM Cheryl N. Greene
22. CSM Todd M. Garner
23. CSM James A. LaFratta
