= Terence Hildner =

United States Army brigadier general (1962-2010)

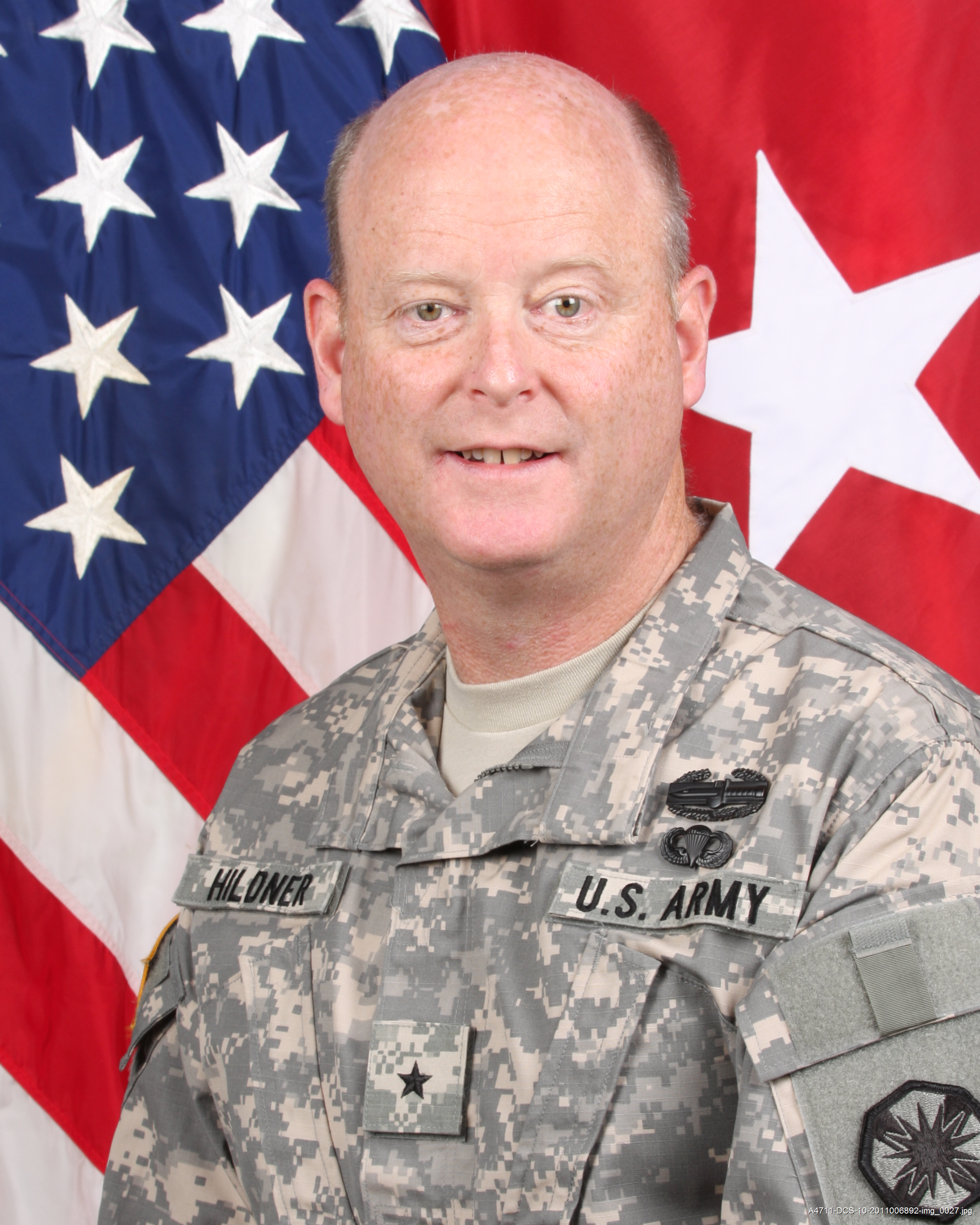
- Brigadier General Terence J. Hildner
- Born: February 20, 1962; New Haven, Connecticut
- Died: February 3, 2012 (aged 49); Kabul, Afghanistan †
- Burial place: Arlington National Cemetery
- Military career
- Allegiance: United States of America
- Branch: United States Army
- Service years: 1984–2012
- Rank: Brigadier General
- Commands: 23rd Quartermaster Brigade; 13th Sustainment Command (Expeditionary)
- Conflicts: Gulf War; Iraq War; War in Afghanistan
- Awards: Legion of Merit; Bronze Star (3); Defense Meritorious Service Medal; Army Meritorious Service Medal (4); Joint Service Commendation Medal; Army Commendation Medal (5); Army Achievement Medal (2)

Brigadier General Terence John Hildner (February 20, 1962 – February 3, 2012) was a United States Army General Officer who served as commander of the 13th Sustainment Command (Expeditionary) from 2010 until his death in 2012. He is the second highest-ranking American officer to die while serving in the war in Afghanistan.

== Military career ==
Hildner graduated from the University of Notre Dame in 1984. He was commissioned as an Armor officer and his first assignment was with the 3rd Armored Cavalry Regiment at Fort Bliss, Texas. In 1988 he joined the 2nd Armored Cavalry Regiment in the Federal Republic of Germany where he served as the Regimental Training Officer and later took command of a ground cavalry troop.

During his company command, Hildner deployed his troop to Saudi Arabia and was part of the U.S. VII Corps' attack into Kuwait and Iraq during Operation Desert Storm. His unit also conducted the last U.S. patrol along the East-West German border before the unification of Germany in 1990.

Later Hildner served in several assignments at Fort Hood, Texas, to include 2nd Armored Division comptroller and aide-de-camp to the commanding general 4th Infantry Division. Following his branch transfer to the Quartermaster Corps, he graduated from the U.S. Army Command and General Staff College in 1997.

Hildner served in a variety of staff positions, to include battalion executive officer of the 296th Forward Support Battalion, supply & services chief for I Corps G4 at Fort Lewis, Washington, and J4 for the Department of Defense's counterdrug task force (JTF-6). As a lieutenant colonel, Hildner assumed command of the 13th Corps Support Command's Special Troops Battalion at Fort Hood, TX. The battalion deployed twice during his nearly two years of command. The first was to Iraq as part of Operation Iraqi Freedom where the battalion served in the capacity of a Combat Sustainment Support Battalion, providing general logistical support to units located around Joint Base Balad as well as the Abu Ghraib prison complex. The second deployment was as part of Logistical Task Force Lone Star, providing both military and humanitarian support operations to the victims of Hurricane Katrina.

In 2007, Hildner authored a paper titled Interagency Reform: Changing Organizational Culture Through Education and Assignment as part of his master of strategic studies degree program.

Hildner commanded the 23rd Quartermaster Brigade at Fort Lee, VA from July 2007 to July 2009, training more than 20,000 Quartermaster Soldiers annually. From 2009 to 2010 he served as the G3/Director of Training & Doctrine for the Combined Arms Support Command (CASCOM).

On August 19, 2010, he assumed command of the 13th Sustainment Command, and subsequently deployed to Afghanistan from his headquarters at Fort Hood in Texas.

Hildner died February 3, 2012, in Kabul, Afghanistan, of apparent natural causes, and is the second highest-ranking American to die in the Afghan war.

Hildner's funeral was held on February 29, 2012, at the Memorial Chapel on Joint Base Myer–Henderson Hall, Virginia. The Army's Chief of Chaplain's Major General Donald L. Rutherford presided over the Catholic Mass and the Chief of Staff of the Army, General Raymond T. Odierno and many other senior military officers attended the service. Hildner was buried in Section 60 of Arlington National Cemetery with full military honors provided by Charlie Company, 3d U.S. Infantry Regiment (The Old Guard).

== Awards and decorations ==
Combat Action Badge
Parachutist Badge

Legion of Merit
Bronze Star Medal with two oak leaf clusters
Defense Meritorious Service Medal
Army Meritorious Service Medal with three oak leaf clusters
Joint Service Commendation Medal
Army Commendation Medal with four oak leaf clusters
Army Achievement Medal with oak leaf cluster
Valorous Unit Award
National Defense Service Medal with service star
Southwest Asia Service Medal with three service stars
Global War on Terrorism Expeditionary Medal
Global War on Terrorism Service Medal
Humanitarian Service Medal
Army Service Ribbon
Overseas Service Ribbon
Kuwait Liberation Medal (Saudi Arabia)
Kuwait Liberation Medal (Kuwait)

=== Other honors ===
- 2006 Recipient of the Military Distinguished Order of Saint Martin (Army Quartermaster Corps).
- 2011 Inducted as a Distinguished Member of the Quartermaster Regiment.
- 2012 Inducted into the Quartermaster Hall of Fame.
