= Billy K. Solomon =

United States Army general

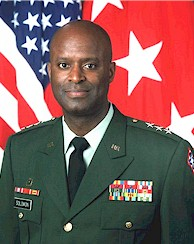
- Lieutenant General Billy K. Solomon
- Born: November 16, 1944 (age 82); Fairfield, Texas, US
- Military career
- Allegiance: United states
- Branch: United States Army
- Service years: 1966 – 2002
- Rank: Lieutenant General
- Commands: Combined Arms Support Command
- Conflicts: Vietnam War
- Awards: Distinguished Service Medal (U.S. Army) with Oak Leaf Cluster; Legion of Merit with 2 Oak Leaf Clusters; Bronze Star Medal with Oak Leaf Cluster

Billy King Solomon (born November 16, 1944) is a retired Quartermaster officer, U.S. Army Lieutenant General and former Commander of the Combined Arms Support Command at Fort Lee, Virginia.

== Early life ==
Lieutenant General Solomon was born in Oakwood, Texas. In 1966, he graduated from Prairie View A&M University with a BS Degree in Agriculture, and was commissioned a Second Lieutenant in the Quartermaster Corps through the Reserve Officer Training Corps Program. He later went on to receive an MS Degree from the Florida Institute of Technology in contracting and acquisition management.

== Military career ==
Other key assignments held during his career included: Director, Logistics and Security Assistance, J4/J7, US Central Command, MacDill Air Force Base, Florida; Chief of Staff, US Army Materiel Command, Alexandria, Virginia; Assistant Chief of Staff, J4/C4/G4, US Forces Korea/United Nations Command/Combined Forces Command/Eighth US Army, Korea; Commander, 13th Corps Support Command, III Corps, Fort Hood, Texas; Commander, Joint Logistics Task Force, United Nations Operations, Somalia; and Commander, Division Support Command, 5th Infantry Division (United States) (Mechanized), Fort Polk, Louisiana.

Lieutenant General Solomon also served in a number of important key developmental assignments, which includes Platoon Leader and S-3 Officer, 266th Supply and Service Battalion, US Army, Vietnam; Assistant G-4, 2nd Armored Division (United States), Fort Hood, Texas; S-3 Officer, Logistics Support Activity, US Army, Vietnam; Commander, Headquarters Company, 88th Supply and Service Battalion, US Army, Vietnam; Supply and Logistics Officer with the 109th and 902nd Military Intelligence Groups, Fort Meade, Maryland; Chief Logistics Officer, US Army Communications Command Agency, Canal Zone, Fort Clayton, Panama; Personnel Management Officer, US Army Military Personnel Center, Alexandria, Virginia; Protocol Officer, Office of the Chief of Staff, Army, Washington, DC; Commander, 498th Support Battalion, 2nd Armored Division (Forward), US Army Europe and Seventh Army, Germany; and Chief, Quartermaster/Chemical Branch, later Chief, Combat Service Support Division, Enlisted Personnel Management Directorate, US Army Personnel Command, Alexandria, Virginia.

Lieutenant General Solomon retired on September 30, 2002, culminating 36 years of distinguished military Service as the Commanding General, US Army Combined Arms Support Command and Fort Lee, Fort Lee, Virginia.

His military education includes the Quartermaster Officers Basic and Advanced Courses, Armed Forces Staff College, Logistics Executive Development Course, and Industrial College of the Armed Forces.

== Decorations and honors ==
- Defense Distinguished Service Medal with Oak Leaf Cluster
- Distinguished Service Medal (U.S. Army) with Oak Leaf Cluster
- Defense Superior Service Medal
- Legion of Merit with 2 Oak Leaf Clusters
- Bronze Star Medal with Oak Leaf Cluster
- Meritorious Service Medal with 3 Oak Leaf Clusters
- Army Commendation Medal with Oak Leaf Cluster
- Army Achievement Medal.

Lieutenant General Solomon is a Distinguished Member of the Quartermaster Regiment, a recipient of the Distinguished Order of Saint Martin and a member of the Quartermaster Hall of Fame.

== Personal ==
Solomon is the son of Quincy Lee Solomon and Jeweline Ricks Solomon. He had three sisters.

Solomon is married to Cathyrn Solomon. They moved to Gainesville, Virginia, after his retirement.
