= 43rd Sustainment Brigade =

4th Infantry Division Sustainment Brigade
- Current shoulder sleeve insignia
- Founded: 1966
- Country: United States
- Branch: United States Army
- Role: Command & control of support & sustainment units
- Size: Brigade
- Part of: 4th Infantry Division
- Garrison/HQ: Fort Carson
- Nickname: Rough Riders
- Motto: Provide With Pride
- Colors: Red & Buff
- Mascot: "Liberty" the White Buffalo
- Anniversaries: 25 March 1966, Unit Activation Day; 7 July 2015, Unit Inactivation
- Decorations: Meritorious Unit Commendation "Southwest Asia"; Joint Meritorious Unit Award (Operation Sea Signal); Coast Guard Meritorious Unit Commendation (Operation Sea Signal); Joint Meritorious Unit Award (OIF/OEF)
- Battle honours: Operation Desert Shield; Operation Desert Storm; Operation Restore Hope; Operation Iraqi Freedom; Operation Enduring Freedom

Commanders
- Brigade Commander: Colonel James Geoffrey Kent
- Notable commanders: Colonel John Howard; Colonel Edward M. Daly; Colonel Anthony K Whitson

Insignia
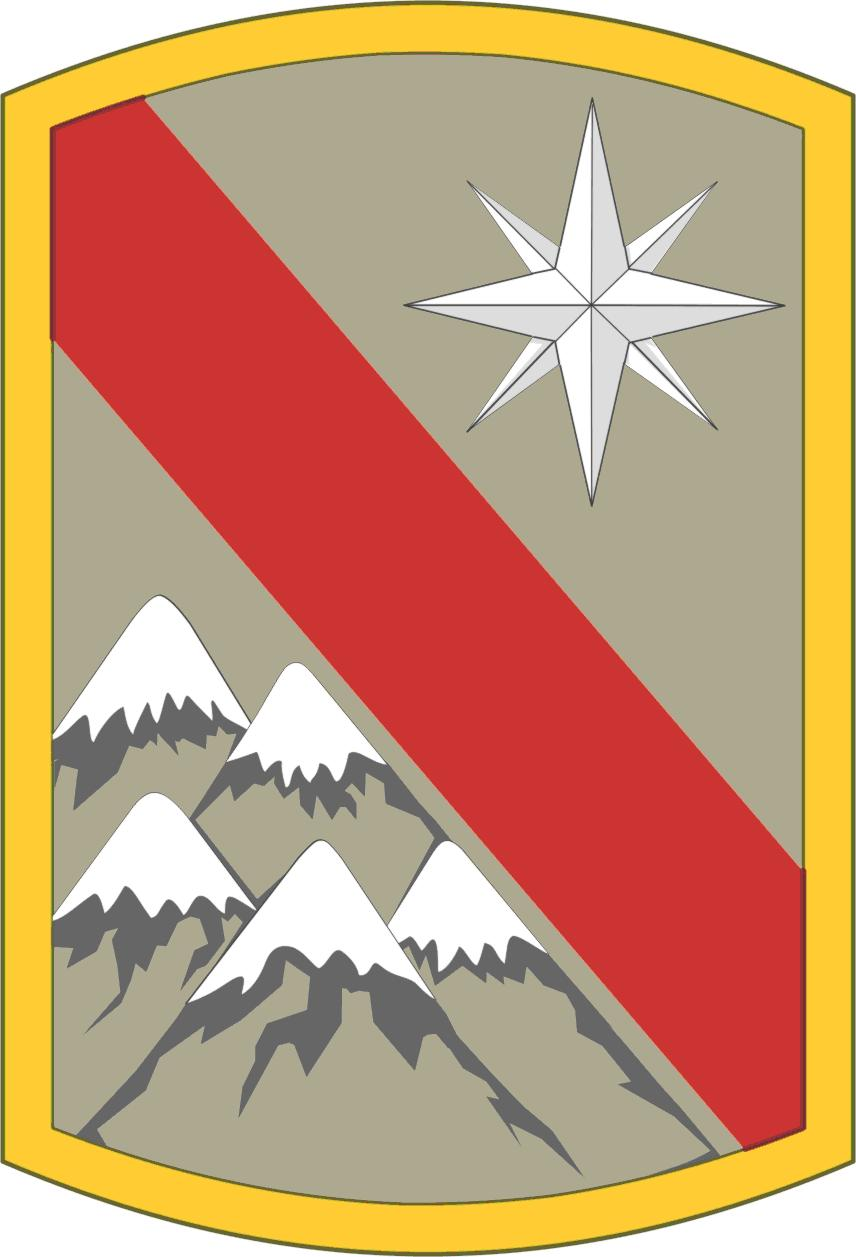
- Former shoulder sleeve insignia

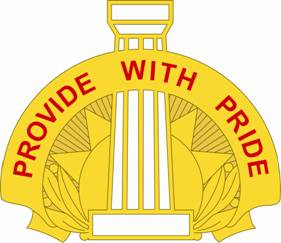
- 4th Sustainment Brigade's Distinctive Unit Insignia

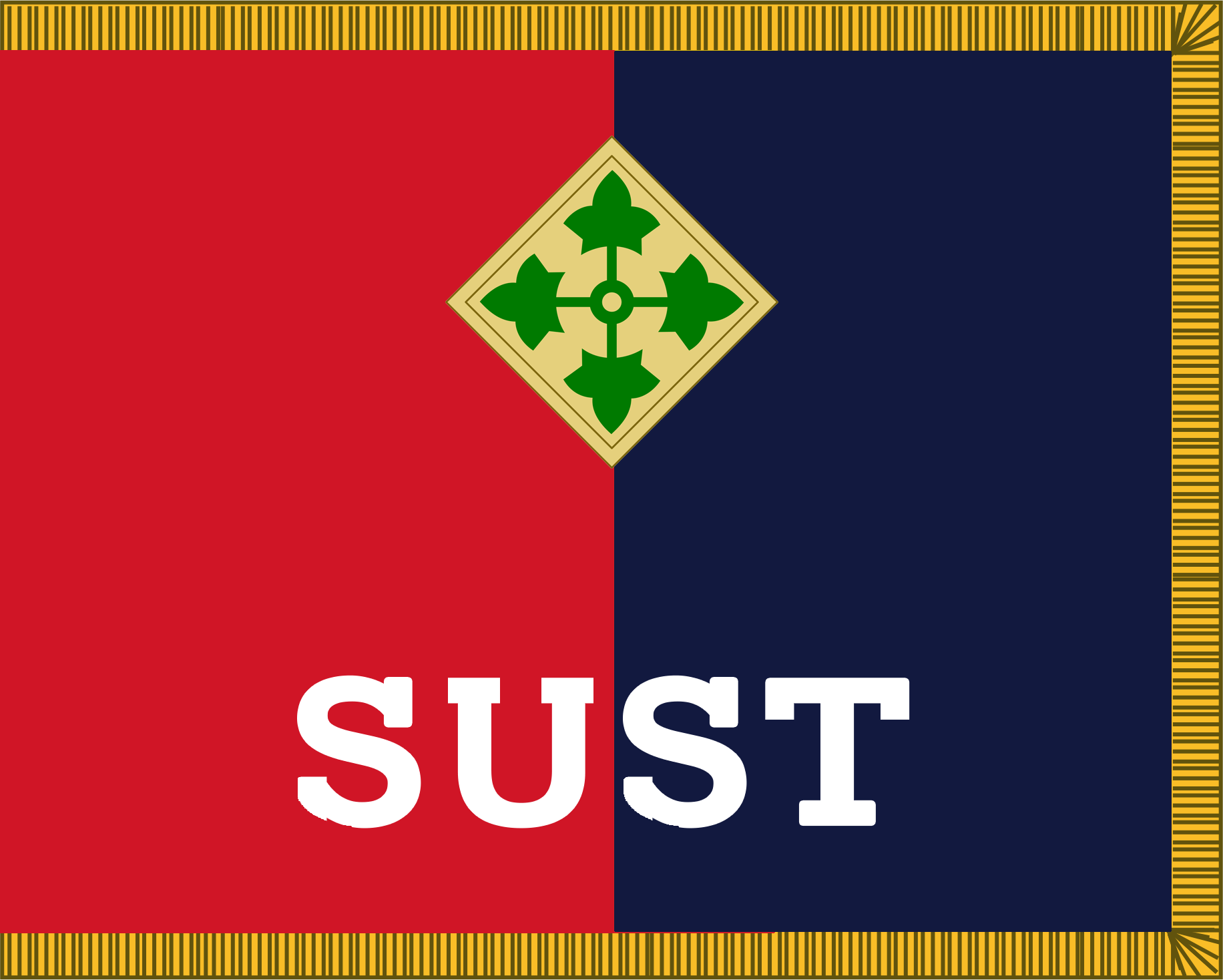
- 4th Division Sustainment Brigade Flag

The 43rd Sustainment Brigade was re-designated the 4th Infantry Division Sustainment Brigade, 4th Infantry Division effective 9 July 2015. a U.S. Army Forces Command (FORSCOM) combat service support unit stationed at Fort Carson, Colorado. The Brigade motto is "Provide with Pride". The Brigade call sign is "Rough Riders". The 43rd Sustainment Brigade has deployed overseas to Somalia, Cuba, Kuwait, Saudi Arabia, Iraq, and Afghanistan. On 9 July 2015 the 43rd Sustainment Brigade was inactivated. Subordinate units were reassigned to the 4th Infantry Division Sustainment Brigade.

== Organization ==
The 43rd Sustainment Brigade was assigned directly to FORSCOM but reported to the 4th Infantry Division while in garrison. Subordinate elements of the 43rd Sustainment Brigade were:

- 68th Combat Sustainment Support Battalion
  - Headquarters and Headquarters Detachment (HHD)
  - 32nd Transportation Company (Palletized Load Systems)
    - 1st Platoon, 2nd Transportation Company (Heavy Equipment Transportation)
  - 59th Quartermaster Company (Petroleum Supply)
    - 40th Quartermaster Detachment (Petroleum Laboratory)
  - 60th Ordnance Company (Ammunition)
  - 183rd Maintenance Company (Equipment Repair and Calibrations)
  - 247th Quartermaster Company (Warehousing, Supply Support Activity, Maintenance)
- Special Troops Battalion, 43rd Sustainment Brigade
  - Headquarters and Headquarters Company, 43rd Sustainment Brigade
  - 22nd Human Resources Company
  - 152nd Movement Control Team
  - 230th Finance Support Unit
  - 534th Signal Company
  - 573rd Movement Control Team
- 759th Military Police Battalion (Administrative Control)
  - HHD, 759th Military Police Battalion
  - 148th Military Police Detachment
  - 59th Military Police Company
  - 110th Military Police Company
  - 127th Military Police Company
  - 984th Military Police Company
- Previous subordinate units
  - 19th Military Police Battalion
  - 52nd Engineer Battalion
  - 70th Ordnance Battalion (1966–1971)
  - 195th Maintenance Battalion
  - 242nd Maintenance Battalion (1966–1967)
  - 336th Ordnance Battalion (1968)
  - 4th Military Intelligence Company
  - 4th Military Police Company
  - 50th Ordnance Company (1963–1992) (Nuclear Munitions) The 50th Ordnance Company was the III Corps' Special Weapons maintenance and storage company.
  - Company B (Ranger), 75th Infantry Regiment
  - 283rd Aviation Company
  - 352nd Transportation Company (Light Truck)
  - 360th Transportation Company (Petroleum Transportation)
  - 549th Quartermaster Company (Field Services)

== Service history ==
The unit was constituted into the Regular Army on 18 January 1966 as the 43rd General Support Group. The unit was activated on 26 March 1966 at Fort Carson, Colorado and organized on 16 May 1966. The first battalion to join the Group was the 68th Transportation Battalion which was activated in August 1966. Three more battalions joined the Group in 1967: 195th Maintenance Battalion on 23 February; 242nd Maintenance Battalion on 25 February; and 70th Ordnance Battalion on 1 March.

On 26 July 1967, acting on a seven-hour notification, HHC, 43rd and 352nd Transportation Company (Light Truck) deployed to Selfridges Air Force Base, Michigan, to provide logistical support for the elements of the XVIII Airborne Corps during riot control operations. In August and September 1967, units of the Group deployed to Alaska during severe flooding to establish a field laundry site. In 1968, the organization of the Group changed: the 336th Ordnance Battalion joined the Group on 20 May and the 242nd Maintenance Battalion, one of the Group's original members, inactivated on 25 August. In addition to Group organization changes, the 336th Ordnance Battalion deployed to Southeast Asia on 26 September 1968.

In 1970 three military police units (19th MP CO, 148th MP PLT and 984th MP CO) and the 283rd Aviation Company joined the Group in May; the 40th Supply and Service Company joined the Group in November; and the 195th Maintenance Battalion (another of the Group's original members) inactivated on 4 December. In 1971 the 283rd Aviation Company was transferred to Fort Bragg in June; the 4th Military Police Company joined the Group; and a third original member, the 70th Ordnance Battalion, was inactivated in November. In 1972 the 19th Military Police Battalion was formed as a headquarters for the Military Police companies; the 52nd Engineer Battalion joined the Group in July; and the 4th Military Intelligence Company and B Company, 75th Infantry(Ranger) joined the Group in August. The Group was redesignated as the 43rd Corps Support Group in 1973.

=== Operation Desert Shield & Desert Storm ===
The 43rd Corps Support Group deployed to Southwest Asia as a part of Operation Desert Shield & Operation Desert Storm from October 1990 to April 1991.

=== Operation Continue Hope ===
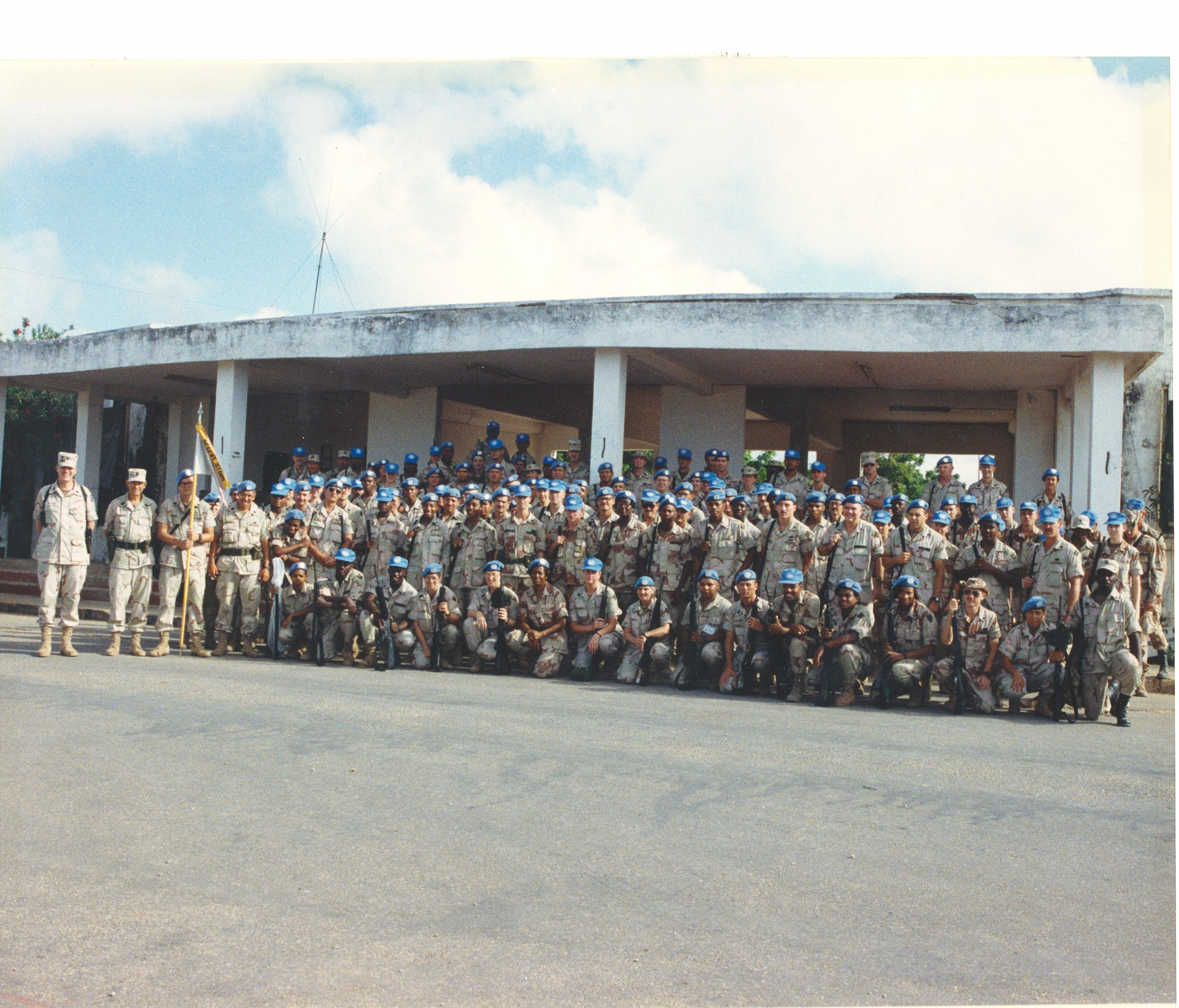
43rd Corps Support Group, Mogadishu, Somalia July 1993

In December 1992, a UN-sanctioned, U.S.-led deployment of more than 30,000 troops began, to ensure delivery of food aid. These troops were gradually reduced and in large part replaced early in 1993 by a UN peacekeeping operation in which the 43rd CSG played a smaller role. United Nations mediators attempted to bring together the various Somali faction leaders to restore peace to the country. On 26 March 1993, the United Nations passed Resolution 814 which considerably broadened its mandate to intervene in another country's affairs. The UN was now intervening militarily in a peacemaking role under Chapter VII of its charter. The (CSG) from Fort Carson, Colorado, was alerted for Somalia in December 1992. The Brigade Staff included: CSM Forrest R. Guess, BDE XO Stephen Strobel, BDE S-1 Major Dan Bandy, BDE S-2 CPT Sherri Rhodus, BDE S-3 MAJ Greg Alderete, BDE SPO Bill Holstun, BDE S-4 MAJ Dona M. Thomas, the Command Chaplain was CPT Duncan Baugh and the Brigade Legal Advisor was CPT Jody M. Hehr. The Headquarters Company was commanded by CPT Tim Garipee and 1SG John L. Elsasser.

Operation Restore Hope ended on 4 May 1993, when the United Nations assumed control of the humanitarian mission from American command. The 43rd CSG deployed to Somalia, under the Command of COL Wade H. McManus Jr., as a part of "Operation Continue Hope" from May 1993 to August 1993 to provide nation building and humanitarian intervention while protecting United Nations efforts. This rapidly escalated into urban warfare after the 5 June 1993 attack on a Pakistani Infantry Company and other citywide assaults. The 43rd CSG Headquarters and Headquarters Company were located at the former University of Mogadishu.

All soldiers of the 43rd CSG were command directed to take a weekly dose of 250 MG of Mefloquine Hydrochloride (also known as Lariam or Mefloquine) an orally administered controversial medication used as a malarial chemoprophylaxis. This drug was recently added to the Department of Veterans Affairs War Related Illness and Injury Study Center (WRIISC) as a "Potential Deployment Exposure". This places Mefloquine in the same category as Agent Orange, Depleted Uranium, Burn Pits and others.

Operation Restore Hope was declared a success in May 1993 and President Clinton celebrated on the White House lawn with Marine Corps Lieutenant General Robert B. Johnston and other Somalia veterans. On 10 May 1993 the 43rd CSG's main body departed Colorado Springs, Colorado on a chartered Boeing 747 from Peterson Air Force Base with layovers in Ireland and Egypt. Operation Continue Hope began that same month with the continued theater service of 4000 servicemen and women. On 5 June 1993, Somali National Alliance forces ambushed and killed 24 Pakistani soldiers assigned to UNOSOM II. Another 44 were wounded. In retaliation, the United Nations Security Council authorized the U.S. and multinational forces to launch ground and air attacks on Aidid's headquarters and strongholds in Mogadishu. The UN's special envoy in Somalia called for Aidid's arrest, but UN forces were unable to accomplish this. On 8 August Somali Guerillas detonated a mine under a passing U.S. Military Police (MP) vehicle on Jialle-Siaad Street in the Medina district of Mogadishu killing four U.S. MPs task organized to the 43rd CGS (Sgt. Christopher Hilgert, 27, of Bloomington, Ind., Specialist Mark Gutting, 25, of Grand Rapids, Mich., and Specialist Keith Pearson, 25, of Tavares, Fla., all of the 977th Military Police Company from Fort Riley, Kan., and Sgt. Ronald Richerson, 24, of Portage, Ind., of the 300th Military Police Company, commanded by Captain Dave Farlow, from Fort Leonard Wood, Mo.) This single, highly effect, attack infamously ushered in a new tactical era of the Improvised Explosive Device (IED). After the death of 18 U.S. soldiers in a firefight with forces loyal to Aidid in October 1993, the United States increased the size of its force in Somalia but withdraw by 31 March 1994. The last remaining U.S. personnel weren't withdrawn until a year later.

The 43rd CSG was awarded the 3rd Army (ARCENT) Shoulder Sleeve Insignia, the Armed Forces Expeditionary Medal (30 Consecutive or 60 Non-consecutive Days) and the United Nations Somalia Service Medal (90 days Service) or the United Nations Medal (mutually exclusive) and four months of combat service to be applied towards a combat service stripe. COL McManus retired from the Army in 2004 as the Commander of US Army Field Support Command, at the rank of major general. For additional information on the 43rd CSG deployment download "The Basement of Hell" by Greg Alderete. The 43rd Corps Support Group was redesignated as the 43rd Area Support Group on 16 April 1994.

=== Operation Sea Signal ===
In September 1994, the 43rd ASG deployed to Guantanamo Bay, Cuba to participate in support of Operation Sea Signal as the 43rd Joint Logistics Support Group for JTF 160. The 43rd returned from Cuba in February 1995.

=== Operation Iraqi Freedom ===
In February 2003 the 43rd Area Support Group deployed to Kuwait and various sites in Iraq to support Operation Iraqi Freedom I. The group returned home in August 2004. The Provider team deployed again from October 2004 to September 2005 to Camp Arifjan, Kuwait as part of Operation Iraqi Freedom III.

=== Operation Enduring Freedom ===
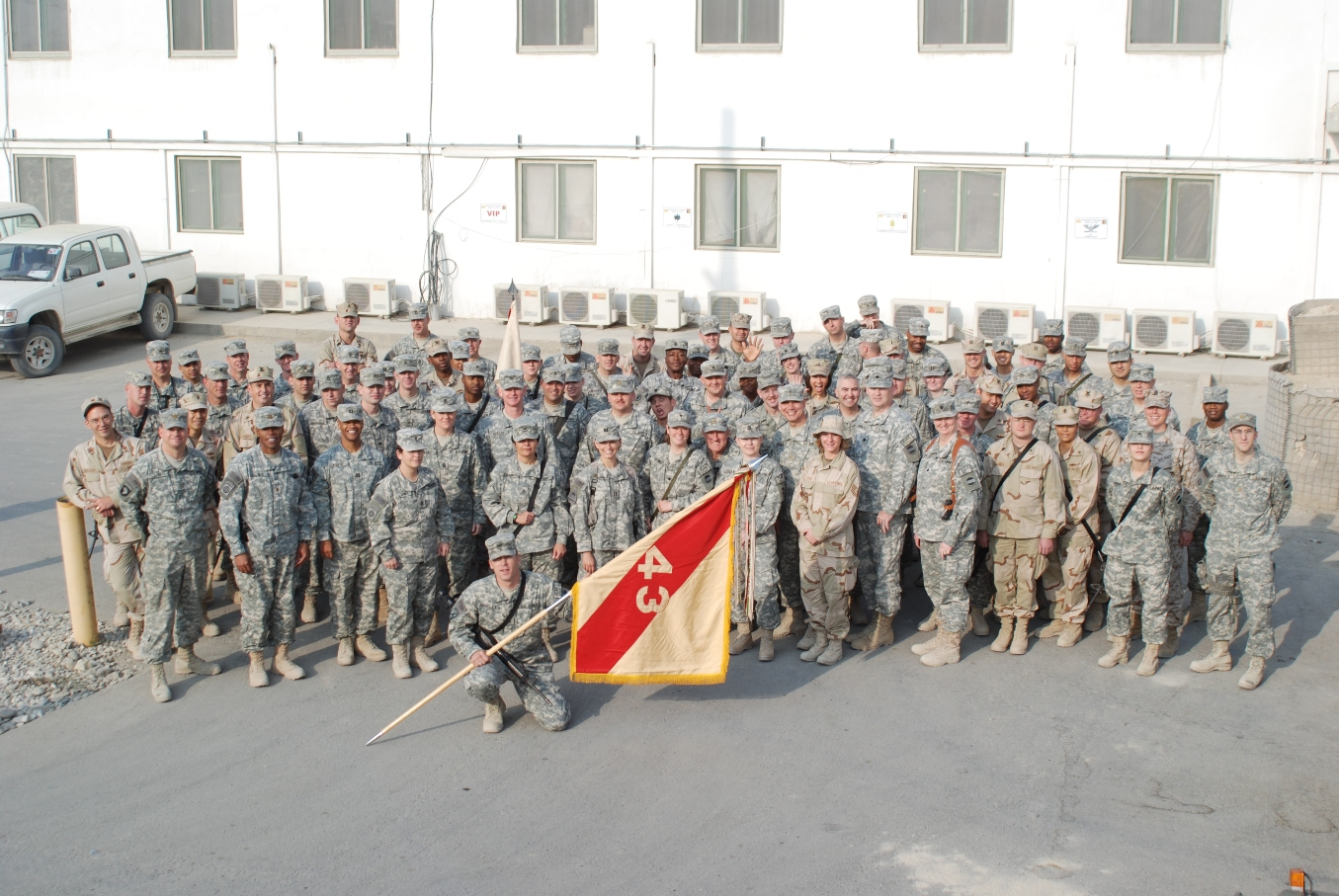
43rd Area Support Group headquarters at Bagram, Afghanistan in 2007.

The 43rd Area Support Group deployed from January 2007 through January 2008 under Colonel John Howard to coordinate logistics for all US forces operating in Afghanistan for Operation Enduring Freedom VIII. The 147th Personnel Service Battalion (MN ARNG), 450th Movement Control Battalion (USAR), and the 726th Finance Battalion (MA ARNG) were attached to the 43rd for this deployment. The unit was operating primarily in support of the 82nd Airborne Division and the 173rd Airborne Brigade after the redeployment of the 10th Mountain Division. During this deployment, a robust Rear-Detachment provided Command & Control for the units that did not deploy- primarily the 4th Engineer Battalion and the 10th Combat Support Hospital as well as elements of the 68th Combat Support Sustainment Battalion.

=== Transformation ===
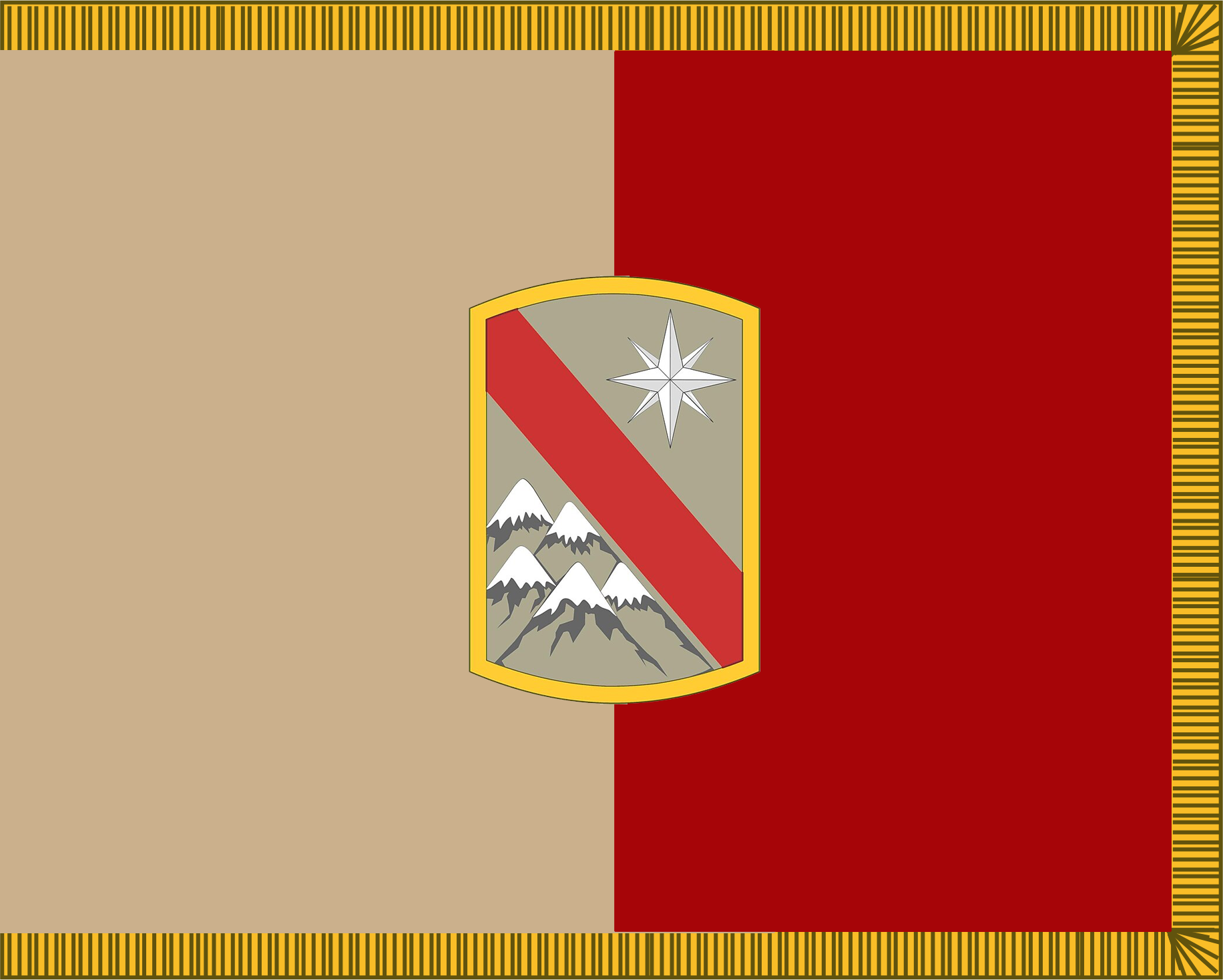
43rd Sustainment Brigade Flag

Effective 17 July 2008, the 43rd Area Support Group was redesignated as the 43rd Sustainment Brigade. As part of the reorganization, the 43rd Brigade Special Troops Battalion and 230th Financial Management Company (FMCO) were activated and the 10th Combat Support Hospital and 4th Engineer Battalion were reassigned away from the brigade.

=== Extra-curricular activities ===
The 43rd maintains an active motorcycle safety program and mentoring program. As part of their esprit d'corps building process, Soldier participated in a "Spring Kick Start" ride through Colorado Springs on 3 April 2009.

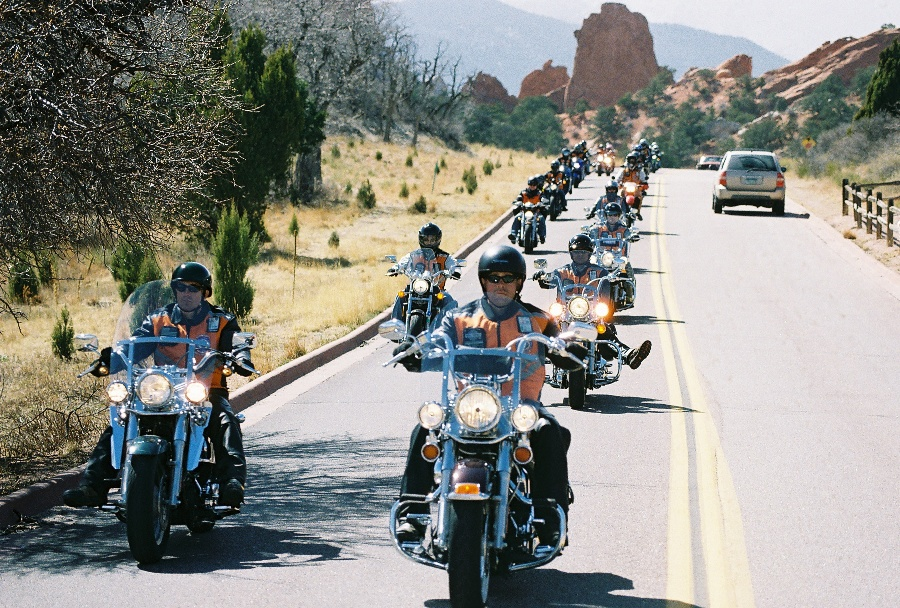
The brigade conducts a motorcycle ride through Colorado Springs.

=== Operation Enduring Freedom XI ===
Colonel Edward Daly led the 43rd Sustainment Brigade Headquarters into Afghanistan for their second tour in March 2010. While deployed in Kandahar, the unit provided logistics to the United States forces operating in Regional Command South and Regional Command Southwest. They returned to Fort Carson in March 2011. The brigade was awarded its second Meritorious Unit Citation for its efforts.

== Campaign participation credit ==
| Conflict | Streamer | Year(s) |
|---|---|---|
| Persian Gulf War | Defense of Saudi Arabia | 1991 |
| Persian Gulf War | Liberation and Defense of Kuwait | 1991 |
| Persian Gulf War | Cease Fire | 1991 |
| Iraq War | Liberation of Iraq | 2003 |
| Iraq War | Transition of Iraq | 2003 |
| Iraq War | Iraqi Governance | 2004 |
| Iraq War | National Resolution | 2005 |
| War in Afghanistan | Consolidation II | 2007–2008 |
| War in Afghanistan | Consolidation III | 2010–2011 |

== Decorations ==
| Streamer | Award | Year | Notes |
|---|---|---|---|
| | Meritorious Unit Commendation (Army) | 2012 | For Logistics Support to RC-South, West, and Southwest during Operation Enduring Freedom |
| | Joint Meritorious Unit Award | 1996 | For Joint Logistics Support Element, Guantanamo Bay, Cuba |
| | Meritorious Unit Commendation (Army) | 1991 | For Operation Desert Shield/Desert Storm |

Meritorious Unit Citation awarded under Permanent Orders 194-13 dated 12 July 2012

== Shoulder sleeve insignia ==
- Description: On a buff-colored vertical rectangular embroidered item, arched outwardly at top and bottom, a red diagonal stripe from upper left to lower right, between a white compass rose upper right and stylized buff mountain range of five peaks with white snowcapped with dark gray details; all within a 1/8 inch (0.32 cm) yellow border. Overall dimensions are 2 1/16 inches (5.2 cm) in width and 3 1/16 inches (7.8 cm) in height.
- Symbolism: Buff and scarlet are the colors traditionally associated with the Support units. The diagonal stripe suggests protection. The compass rose signifies guidance and the unit's capability to deploy worldwide. The stylized mountain range denotes Fort Carson, Colorado, home of the unit since 1966. The five peaks allude to the five campaigns fought by the 43rd Corps and Area Support Groups, predecessors to the 43rd Sustainment Brigade.
- Background: The shoulder sleeve insignia was approved effective 16 April 2008. The insignia was designed by unit personnel while deployed to Afghanistan in 2007.

== Distinctive unit insignia ==
- Description: A gold color metal and enamel device 1 1/4 inches (3.2 cm) in height overall consisting of a white Doric column in center and behind its lower half a gold sun with two rays shown on either side above two sprigs of laurel issuant at either side of the column base; enclosing the sun and laurel passing in front of the upper section of the column a semi-circular gold scroll inscribed with the words "PROVIDE WITH PRIDE" in red letters.
- Symbolism: The central column is indicative of strength and support. The gold sun is for the high quality of service the unit provides and the laurel represents pride in achievement.
- Background: The distinctive unit insignia was originally approved for the 43rd Support Group on 25 April 1973. It was redesignated effective 16 April 2008, for the 43rd Sustainment Brigade and amended to update the description and symbolism.

== Liberty ==
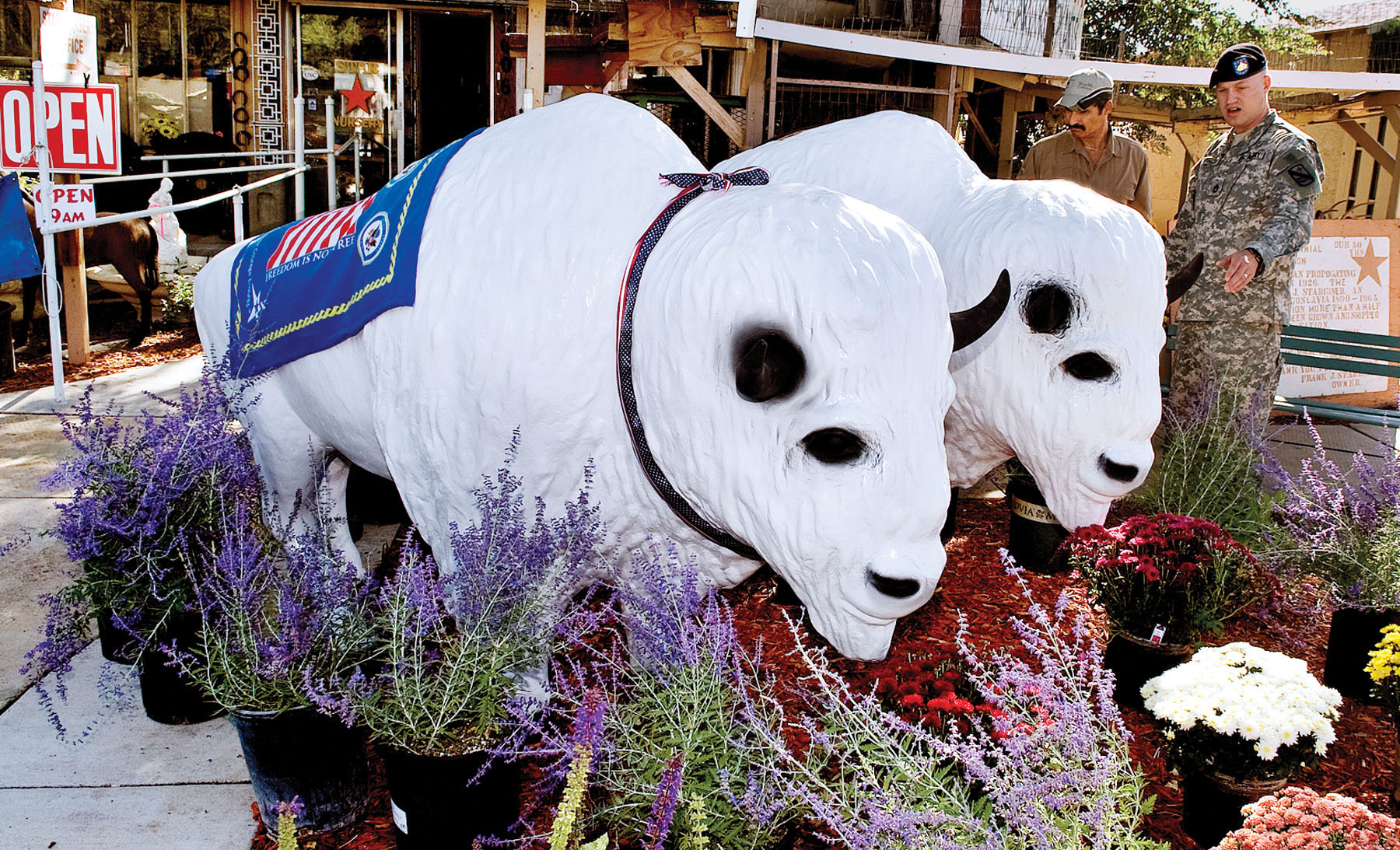
Liberty at Fort Carson

- The White Buffalo of the 43rd Area Support Group is named "Liberty", and was unveiled on 1 October 2001. It was manufactured by Star Nursery & Garden Center, Pueblo, Colorado. In some traditions, these animals are sacred. The "White Buffalo" is the most revered of all. The appearance of the White Buffalo is a sign that prayers are being heard, that the sacred pipe is being honored, and that the promises of prophesy are being fulfilled.
- Liberty has deployed with the Brigade Headquarters to Iraq, Kuwait, and Afghanistan.
- On 17 September 2008, Liberty was refurbished and Liberty II was delivered into the custody of the Brigade by Star Nursery allowing the unit to deploy one while the other guards the home front.

== In the media ==
Equipment from the 43rd ASG was used as backdrop for Stargate SG-1. Location shooting was conducted at the NORAD facility, Cheyenne Mountain, Colorado Springs, Colorado in the vicinity of the 43rd's garrison at Fort Carson.
