= 68th Division Sustainment Support Battalion =

68th Division Sustainment Support Battalion (68th DSSB)
- 4th Infantry Division shoulder sleeve insignia
- Active: 1936–1945; 1966–present
- Country: USA
- Branch: U.S. Army
- Role: Mission Command of support and sustainment units
- Size: Battalion
- Part of: 4th Infantry Division Sustainment Brigade
- Garrison/HQ: Fort Carson
- Motto: "Wheels of Distinction"
- Anniversaries: 1 May 1936 unit constituted
- Decorations: Joint Meritorious Unit Award; Meritorious Unit Commendation; Meritorious Unit Commendation
- Battle honours: World War II; Operation Desert Shield; Operation Desert Storm; Operation Iraqi Freedom

Commanders
- Current commander: Lieutenant Colonel Jason H. Eaton
- Command Sergeant Major: Command Sergeant Major Randy E. Leyba

Insignia
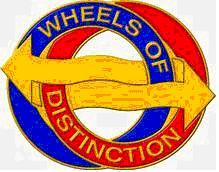
- Distinctive unit insignia

The 68th Division Sustainment Support Battalion (68th DSSB) is a U.S. Army support battalion stationed at Fort Carson, Colorado. The battalion motto is "Stagecoach, LET'S GO". The 68th Division Sustainment Support Battalion's current call sign is "Stagecoach". The 68th DSSB has deployed overseas to India, Burma, Somalia, Cuba, Kuwait, Syria, Saudi Arabia, Iraq, and Afghanistan.

== Lineage ==
- Constituted 1 May 1936 in the Regular Army as Headquarters, 2d Battalion 45th Quartermaster Regiment (Truck-Army).
- Redesignated 8 January 1940 as Headquarters, 2d Battalion 45th Quartermaster Regiment (Truck).
- Redesignated 1 April 1942 as Headquarters, 2d Battalion 45th Quartermaster Truck Regiment.
- Redesignated 1 December 1943 as Headquarters and Headquarters Detachment, 68th Quartermaster Battalion, Mobile.
- Redesignated 1 August 1946 as Headquarters and Headquarters Detachment, 68th Transportation Corps Truck Battalion.
- Redesignated 14 July 1966 as Headquarters and Headquarters Detachment, 68th Transportation Battalion.
- Activated 25 August 1966 at Fort Carson, Colorado.
- Redesignated 15 October 1992, as Headquarters and Headquarters Detachment, 68th Corps Support Battalion.
- Redesignated 1 October 2006, as Headquarters and Headquarters Company, 68th Combat Sustainment Support Battalion.
- Redesignated 16 February 2022, as Headquarters and Headquarters Company, 68th Division Sustainment Support Battalion.

== Organization ==
The 68th DSSB is currently assigned to the 4th Infantry Division Sustainment Brigade. Subordinate elements of the 68th DSSB are:

- 68th Division Sustainment Support Battalion
  - Headquarters and Headquarters Detachment
    - Redesignated 16 February 2022, as Headquarters and Headquarters Company
  - 247th Composite Supply Company (Warehousing)
    - Redesignated 16 February 2022, as Alpha Company, 68 DSSB
  - 183rd Support Maintenance Company (Equipment Repair and Calibrations)
    - Redesignated 16 February 2022, as Bravo Company, 68 DSSB
      - 40th Quartermaster Detachment (Petroleum Laboratory)
  - 32nd Composite Truck Company (Palletized Load Systems)
    - Redesignated 16 February 2022, as Charlie Company, 68 DSSB
  - 59th Quartermaster Company (Petroleum Supply)
  - 60th Ordnance Company (Ammunition)
- Previous subordinate units
  - 50th Ordnance Company (1963-1992) (Nuclear Munitions) The 50th Ordnance Company was the III Corps' Special Weapons maintenance and storage company. It was one of the few stateside companies that 55G / 260A MOS (Nuclear Weapons Maintenance Technicians) soldiers could be assigned. It was one of only three Army company size units that had their own crest and motto. ("The Best Yet")
  - 115th Quartermaster Company (Field Feeding) 2018–2019. Reassigned to the 4th Special Troops Battalion.
  - 312th Transportation Company (Light-Medium)
  - 360th Transportation Company (Petroleum Transportation)
  - 421st Transportation Company (Medium Truck Petroleum)
  - 549th Field Service Company
  - 557th Transportation Company (Heavy Truck)

== Service history ==
Constituted 1 May 1936 in the Regular Army as Headquarters, 2d Battalion 45th Quartermaster Regiment (Truck-Army) and allotted to the Eighth Corps Area. Redesignated 29 September 1939 as Headquarters, 2d Battalion 45th Quartermaster Regiment (Truck-Corps). Redesignated 8 January 1940 as Headquarters, 2d Battalion 45th Quartermaster Regiment (Truck). Redesignated 1 April 1942 as Headquarters, 2d Battalion 45th Quartermaster Truck Regiment.

=== World War II ===
Activated 9 May 1942 at Camp John T. Knight, Oakland Sub-Port of Embarkation, California. In January 1943, the battalion proceeded to Camp Stoneman, Pittsburg, Northern California where they participated in numerous training exercises in preparation for deployment. The battalion delivered by convoy large numbers of vehicles to ports of embarkation up and down the Pacific Coast from the Stockton Ordnance Depot to Vancouver, Washington, Port Hueneme, California and Los Angeles, California.

In September 1943 the battalion boarded the transport George Washington in San Pedro (Submarine Base, Los Angeles), California and voyaged for 6 weeks to Bombay, India. After 4 days in Bombay, the battalion boarded the British transport Nevasa and sailed to Calcutta, India. The 2nd Battalion remained in Calcutta to clean up the bottleneck of supplies that had developed from incoming ships and barges. With this mission accomplished, the battalion joined the rest of the 45th Quartermaster Regiment in Ledo, Assam.

On 1 December 1943, the battalion was redesignated as Headquarters and Headquarters Detachment, 68th Quartermaster Battalion, Mobile with subordinate companies redesignated as the 3465th, 3466th, 3467th and 3468th Quartermaster Truck Companies.

The duties of the battalion consisted of rail unloading and convoying supplies forward for the Chinese Army in India and Merrill's Marauders. The convoying continued in ever-increasing distances as the length of the road was extended until it linked up with the Burma Road in Wanting. The battalion was one of the first units to be put on Burma Convoy Duty delivering vehicles to the China Theater Headquarters at Kunming. While the Japanese attempted to break out into the Imphal Plain, the battalion was called on to assume infantry duty to protect the Ledo Base in the event of a possible attack. However, not a single Japanese showed up and the battalion returned to convoy duty.

In October 1945, after V-J Day, the battalion left Ledo by train across India to Karachi Port, India and eventually arrived in New York on 24 November. The battalion was broken up, out processed, and inactivated on 26 November 1945 at Camp Kilmer, New Jersey and Officers and Soldiers returned by detachments to camps nearest their homes.

=== Inactivation and rebirth ===
Redesignated 1 August 1946 as Headquarters and Headquarters Detachment, 68th Transportation Corps Truck Battalion. Redesignated 14 July 1966 as Headquarters and Headquarters Detachment, 68th Transportation Battalion. Activated 25 August 1966 at Fort Carson, Colorado under the 43rd General Support Group. The battalion loaded the 1st Brigade, 5th Infantry Division's vehicles and equipment for Vietnam in July 1968.
The following units were assigned or attached to the 68th at various times during the Vietnam era:

- 312th Transportation Company (Light-Medium) was inactivated on 5 September 1968.
- 421st Transportation Company (Medium Truck Petroleum) was inactivated in September 1968.
- 557th Transportation Company (Heavy Truck) was inactivated on 5 September 1968.
- 724th Transportation Company (Medium Truck Petroleum) activated from Forest Park, Illinois, on 13 May 1968 as part of the National Reserve call-up.
- 890th Transportation Company (Medium Truck Cargo) activated from Fort Wayne, Indiana, on 13 May 1968 as part of the National Reserve call-up.

Over the years, the battalion has maintained high state of readiness and training, in addition to providing essential transportation support to units in the contiguous United States.

=== Operations Desert Shield and Desert Storm ===
The 68th Transportation Battalion deployed to Saudi Arabia from October 1990 to June 1991 in support of Operation Desert Shield/Desert Storm. Throughout this campaign, the 68th provided key transportation support throughout the theater. The unit received the Meritorious Unit Citation for services in Southwest Asia.

=== Operation Restore Hope ===
On 15 October 1992, the battalion was re-designated as the 68th Corps Support Battalion. From May to September 1993, the 68th once again was on the move. The battalion deployed to Mogadishu, Somalia to provide maintenance, supply, transportation and field services in support of Operation Continue Hope.

=== Operation Sea Signal ===
From October 1994 to March 1995, the 68th Corps Support Battalion deployed to Guantanamo Bay, Cuba. In support of Operation Sea Signal, the battalion provided essential life support to include transportation, maintenance, supply and field services to Cuban and Haitian migrants and US Forces. The unit received the Joint Meritorious Unit Award for service to Joint Task Force 160 during this operation. The 68th returned to Guantanamo Bay, Cuba from January to April 1996 to close the migrant support facilities constructed during Operation Sea Signal.

=== Operation Iraqi Freedom ===
- OIF 1: From January to October 2003, the 68th deployed to Camp Arifjan, Kuwait in support of Operations Enduring Freedom and Iraqi Freedom. The battalion departed Fort Carson on 14 January and arrived at Camp Arifjan, Kuwait at 0400 hours on 15 January. Upon arrival, the battalion assumed duties as the Camp Mayor responsible for reception, billeting, land management, and force protection. Shortly thereafter, the battalion assumed control of the Theater Distribution Center, which handled all Class II, III(P), and IV for the entire theater. The battalion also assumed responsibility for the Theater Class I Activity. The battalion managed the only GS Class IX activity for the entire theater at the GS Class IX warehouse, managed the Direct Support Maintenance Activity for southern Kuwait, and managed the DS Class IX warehouse for all of southern Kuwait.
- OIF III- From October 2004 to October 2005, the 68th Corps Support Battalion deployed to Taji, Iraq to provide command and control of medium (petroleum and general cargo) and heavy lift transportation support, tailorable ammunition supply support, direct support maintenance, bulk petroleum and CL IX supply support to divisional and non-divisional units in their area of operations. While deployed the unit trained the 1st Iraqi Truck Regiment for the transition authority to support the downsizing of coalition forces within theater. The battalion tracked flights for over 1,800 soldiers and performed perimeter guard with over 108 Soldiers to include training and providing a quick reaction force as needed. The Stagecoach Soldiers executed 1,859 transportation movement requests while conducting 1,132 combat logistics patrols. These Soldiers traveled 2,513,712 miles transporting 31,475,746 gallons of CL III(B) and 179,372 short tons of commodity while their Direct Support Maintenance Company completed 2,122 maintenance jobs.
- OIF 07-08- The battalion deployed to Iraq again in 2007 in support of US and Coalition Forces. They redeployed in 2008.
  - From December 2009 through November 2010, the 60th Ordnance Company handled more than 4,500 tons of ammunition in Iraq.

=== Transformation ===
- Redesignated 1 October 2006, as Headquarters and Headquarters Company, 68th Combat Sustainment Support Battalion.

=== Operation Enduring Freedom ===
- From December 2009 through November 2010, the Headquarters Company conducted a year-long successful deployment to Southern Afghanistan, mostly due to the dedication of the 114th Transportation Company out of Duluth, MN which earned Transportation Company of the year for their efforts in Afghanistan.
- In May through November 2011, the 59th Quartermaster Company deployed to Afghanistan.

Operation Spartan Shield

From January 2020 through August 2020 the 68th Combat Sustainment Support Battalion provided distribution, field feeding support and movement control support to five different brigade elements, totaling over 120 customers, they devised a new method for tracking, accounting for and distributing over $200 million worth of commodities, 300,000 gallons of fuel (and) 650 transportation movement requests, between Kuwait, Bahrain and the Kingdom of Saudi Arabia.

Transformation

- Redesignated 16 February 2022, as Headquarters and Headquarters Company, 68th Division Sustainment Support Battalion.

Operation European Assure, Deter, and Reinforce

From November 2022 through current, the 68th DSSB Headquarters and Headquarters Company deployed by air to FOS Powidz, Poland where it conducted a transfer of authority on 22 November 2022 assuming sustainment operation in support of Operation European Assure, Deter, and reinforce.

The following units were assigned or attached to the 68th at various times during this rotation:

- Alpha Company, 524th Division Sustainment Support Battalion
- 548th SMC
- Bravo Company, 68th Division Sustainment Support Battalion
- 524th POL Company
- 325th POL Company
- 432nd Transportation Company (Linehaul)
- 1133d Transportation Company (Linehaul)
- 60th Ordnance Company
- 63rd Ordnance Company

== Campaign streamers ==
Conflict	Streamer	Year(s)
World War II	India-Burma	1943
World War II	Central Burma	1944
Gulf War	Defense of Saudi Arabia	1991
Gulf War	Liberation and Defense of Kuwait	1991
Gulf War	Cease Fire	1991
	Somalia	1992-1995
Operation Iraqi Freedom	Liberation of Iraq	2003
Operation Iraqi Freedom	Transition of Iraq	2003
Operation Iraqi Freedom	Iraqi Governance	2004
Operation Iraqi Freedom	National Resolution	2005
Operation Enduring Freedom	Consolidation III	2009–2010

== Decorations ==
Ribbon	Award	Year	Notes
	Joint Meritorious Unit Award	1994–1995	For Operation Sea Signal
	Meritorious Unit Commendation (Army)	1991	For Operation Desert Shield/Desert Storm
	Meritorious Unit Commendation (Army)	2004–2005	For Operation Iraqi Freedom
	Meritorious Unit Commendation (Army)	2009-2010	For Operation Enduring Freedom
	Meritorious Unit Commendation (Army)	2013	Unknown / PO 079-09

== Shoulder sleeve insignia ==
Description: On a light khaki square, each side 2 inches (5.08 cm) in width overall and with one angle up, four green ivy leaves arranged per cross issuing from a small open circle (one leaf in each angle of the square and the vertical and horizontal axis each 2 11/32 inches (5.95 cm) in length) all within a 1/8-inch (.32 cm) light khaki border.

Symbolism: The four leaves allude to the numerical designation of the Division while the word "I-VY" as pronounced, suggests the characters used in the formation of the Roman numeral "IV." Ivy leaves are also symbolic of fidelity and tenacity.

Background The shoulder sleeve insignia was originally approved for the 4th Division on 30 October 1918, without any background specified for the ivy leaf design. The design was embroidered on a square olive background (color of the uniform). It was redesignated for the 4th Infantry Division effective 4 August 1943. On 2 July 1958, the design was changed to reflect the light khaki color background. The insignia was amended to add a symbolism on 1 April 1969. (TIOH Drawing Number A-1-79)

== Distinctive unit insignia ==
Description: A gold and enamel device, one inch in height, consisting of a blue ring interlace over and under a brick red ring, each issuing one wavy gold arrow overall to the left and to the right between the motto inscribed on top of the blue ring "Wheels of" and on the bottom of the ring "Distinction", all in gold. The two rings simulate wheels; the blue alludes to the Quartermaster insignia wheel from which the unit descended, and the brick red one to the Transportation Corps insignia wheel. The two arrows represent honors awarded the unit during the India-Burma and Central Burma campaigns during World War II, and the wavy arrows symbolize the tortured Burma Road run as well as suggests the important idea of "Points of Departure and Arrival."

Crest: On a wreath of the colors (or and gules [brick red]) an elephant passant superimposed by the head of a Burmese tribeswoman in traditional brass neck loops and jewelry surmounted in base by the tip of a scimitar suspended bendwise from the elephant's upraised trunk proper.
