= 59th Quartermaster Company =

4th Infantry Division Sustainment Brigade
- Shoulder Sleeve Insignia
- Active: 1941–present
- Country: United States
- Allegiance: United States
- Branch: U.S. Army
- Type: Military logistics
- Role: Provide bulk petroleum
- Size: Company
- Part of: FORSCOM
- Garrison/HQ: Fort Carson
- Nickname: Fuel Dogs
- Patron: Saint Martin of Tours
- Motto: On Point
- Anniversaries: 13 January 1941, Unit Constitution
- Decorations: Meritorious Unit Commendation "VIETNAM 1966–1967"; Meritorious Unit Commendation "IRAQ 2004–2005"; Meritorious Unit Commendation "Afghanistan 2011"
- Battle honours: World War II; Vietnam; Iraq; Afghanistan

Insignia
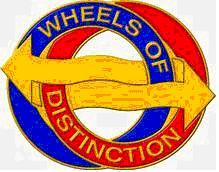
- Distinctive unit insignia

The 59th Quartermaster Company is a bulk petroleum company designed to provide semi-portable storage for 2.5 million US gallons (9,500 m^{3}) of fuel and to provide distribution of fuel to military units within a specified geographic area while deployed overseas. Its secondary mission is to provide an armed military escort to military cargo and civilian trucks during overseas contingency operations. It is a U.S. Army Forces Command combat service support unit stationed at Fort Carson, Colorado under the command of the 68th Combat Sustainment Support Battalion. The 59th has deployed overseas to Algeria, Italy, France, Germany, Korea, Vietnam, Kuwait, Saudi Arabia, Iraq, and Afghanistan. The 59th is the only bulk petroleum company in the Regular Army; all sister units are part of the Army Reserve as of 2011.

== Service history ==
The unit was constituted into the Regular Army on 13 January 1941 as Company B, 240th Quartermaster Battalion and composed of African-American Soldiers. On 15 February 1944, the unit was redesignated as the 3251st Quartermaster Service Company. During World War II, the unit served in the Mediterranean Theater of Operations and served during the Rome-Arno campaign, the invasion of Southern France (Operation Dragoon); the Rhineland campaign; the Ardennes-Alsace campaign; and the campaign in Central Europe. The unit was inactivated following World War II. It briefly served in Korea from December 1946 until July 1947 when it was redesignated from the 3251st to the 59th. From September 1950 until December 1957 the company served at Fort Lee, Virginia. The 59th deployed to Vietnam in 1965 and served until its inactivation in 1972. The 59th's latest period of service began in 1995 and includes service during Operation Iraqi Freedom and Operation Enduring Freedom.

=== World War II ===
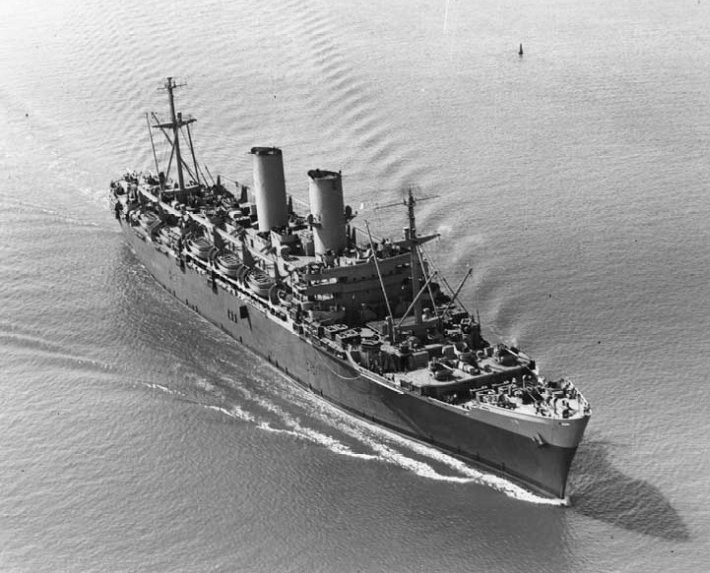
USS General M. C. Meigs (AP-119)

After taking part in both the Louisiana and the Carolina Maneuvers, B Company deployed to Oran, Algeria in November 1942 in support of the Mediterranean Base Section. In June 1944, the 3251st deployed to Italy in support of the 5th Army's Rome/Arno campaign. The 3251st was transferred to the 7th Army and remained under its command for the rest of the war. The 3251st participated in Operation Dragoon in direct support of the 45th Infantry Division under the command of the 240th Quartermaster Battalion and then supported the divisions of the 7th Army as they fought their way across France into Germany. The 3251st returned to the United States through the Newport News Port of Embarcation aboard the AP-116 General Meigs on 13 October 1945.

=== Vietnam ===
The 59th served under the 1st Logistics Command while deployed to Vietnam. The company operated the Army mortuaries at Cam Ranh Bay and Boa Loc. In addition, the unit provided clothing reclamation and laundry services on those bases. During their service in Vietnam, the unit strength fluctuated between 297 officers and men and a low of 268 officers and men.

=== Operation Iraqi Freedom ===
In 2003 the 59th deployed to Kuwait and various sites in Iraq to support the 3rd Infantry Division. The Fuelmasters deployed again from October 2004 to September 2005 to support the 1st Corps Support Command.

=== Operation Enduring Freedom ===
From May to November 2011 the 59th deployed 170 Soldiers to Bagram Airfield, Afghanistan to conduct convoy security operations for logistics convoys. The 59th initially fell under the command of the 17th Combat Sustainment Support Battalion of the 101st Sustainment Brigade and later the 142nd Combat Sustainment Support Battalion of the 10th Sustainment Brigade after the previous units rotated back to the United States.

=== Current operations ===
The 59th is currently conducting operations in support of the 4th Infantry Division and its brigade combat teams and other Fort Carson tenant units. In addition, the unit is providing hot (engine running) refuel services at Butts Army Airfield. The airfield provides support to the US Army aviation units based at Fort Carson as well as transient aircraft from other services and bases.

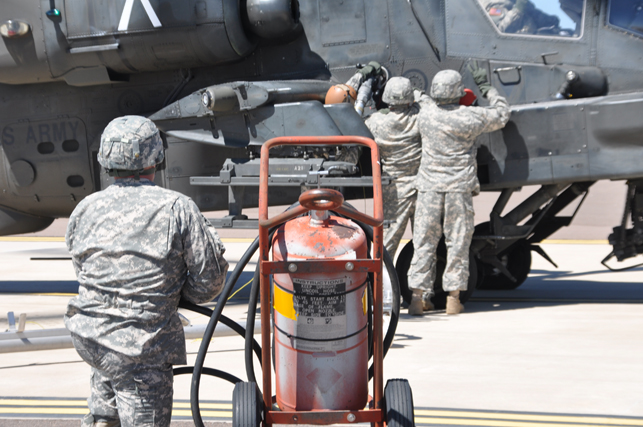
Soldiers attach a fuel hose to an AH-64 Apache while the safety stands by in case of fire.

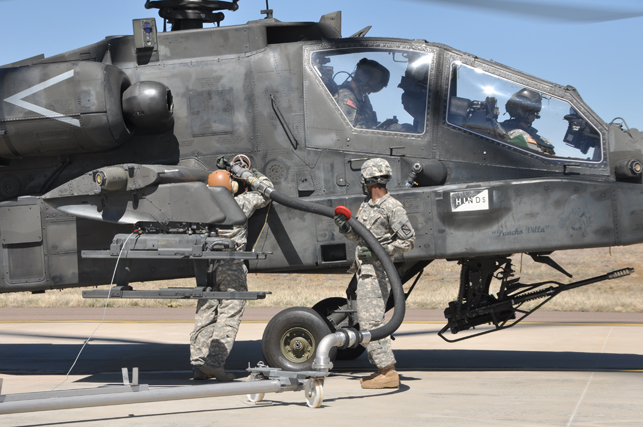
Soldiers connect the fuel hose to an AH-64 Apache.

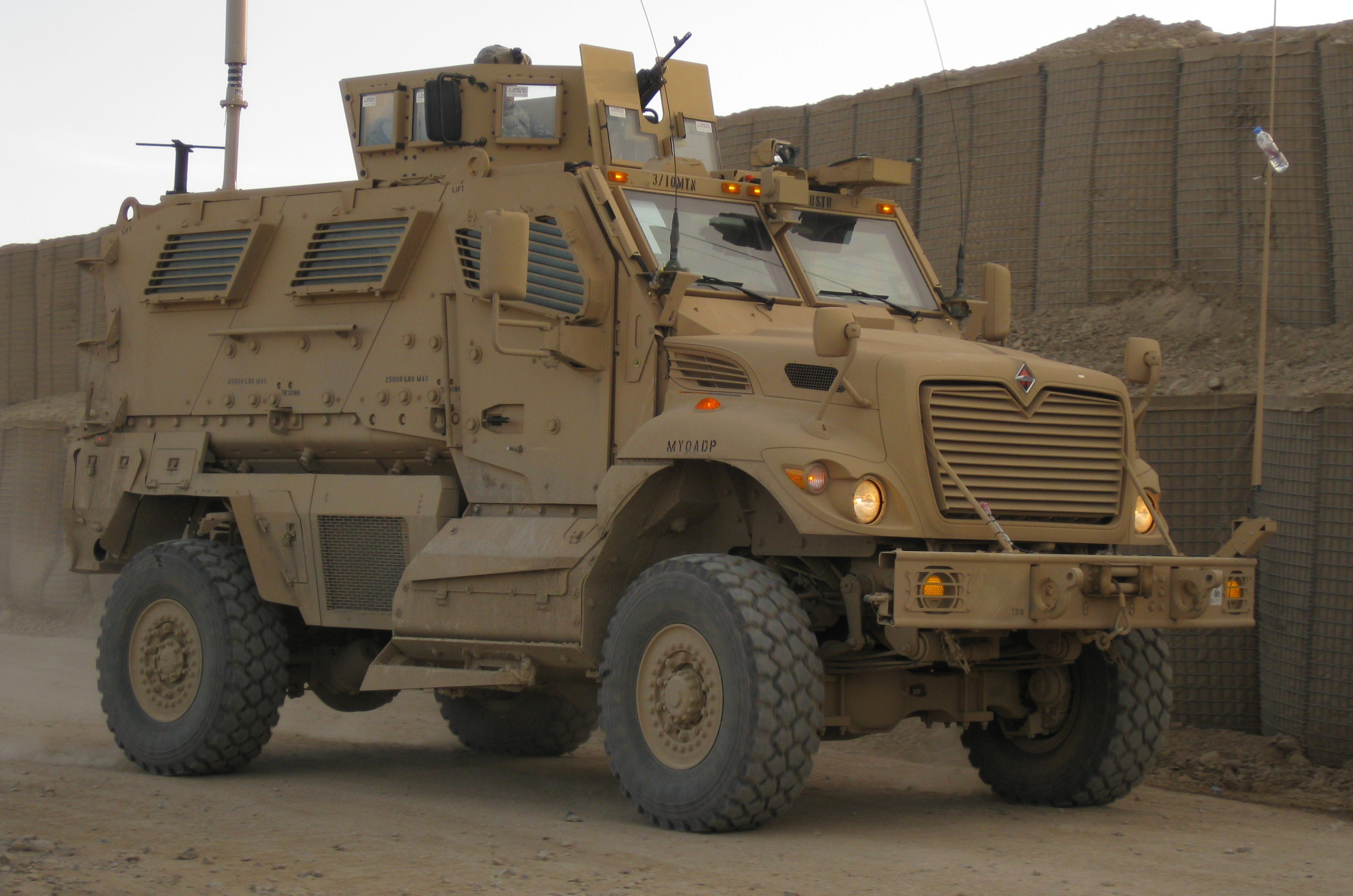
MaxxPro Armored Truck.

== Organization ==
The 59th Quartermaster Company is organized with a Headquarters platoon, three petroleum supply platoons, and a maintenance platoon. The 40th Quartermaster Detachment normally functions as part of the headquarters platoon.

=== Personnel ===
The 59th Quartermaster Company is authorized 225 Soldiers, non-commissioned officers, warrant officers, and officers. The two Soldiers composing the 40th Quartermaster Detachment (Petroleum Laboratory) are attached to the 59th for training, support, and disciplinary purposes. The 59th is composed of personnel from the Quartermaster Corps, Ordnance Corps, Signal Corps, Adjutant General Corps, Engineer Corp, and Chemical Corps.

- Enlisted Specialties
  - 12N Horizontal Construction Engineer
  - 25U Signal Support Specialist
  - 42A Personnel Specialist
  - 74D CBRN Specialist
  - 91B Wheeled Vehicle Mechanic
  - 91C Utilities Equipment Repairer
  - 91D Power Generation Equipment Repairer
  - 91E Allied Trades Specialist
  - 91X Maintenance Supervisor
  - 91Z Senior Maintenance Supervisor
  - 92A Automated Logistical Specialist
  - 92F Petroleum Supply Specialist
  - 92G Food Service Operations
  - 92L Petroleum Laboratory Specialist (40th Quartermaster Detachment only)
  - 92Y Unit Supply Specialist
- Warrant Officer Specialties
  - 923A Petroleum Technician
  - 915A Automotive Maintenance Warrant Officer
- Officer Specialties
  - 90A Logistics Officer (company commander)
  - 92A Quartermaster, General
  - 92F Petroleum and Water

=== Equipment ===
- SEE Truck
- HMMH Truck
- Fuel System Supply Point
- Assault Hoseline System
- M969 Fuel Tanker
- M931 Trucks
- M1151
- Medium Tactical Vehicles
- M998 Humvees
- Mine Resistant Ambush Protected Vehicles
- Maxxpro MaxxPro Armored Truck
- Common Remotely Operated Weapon System
- M2 Heavy Machine Gun
- MK-19 Automatic grenade Launcher
- M249 Light Machine Gun
- M16 Rifle
- M203 Grenade Launcher
- M9 Pistol
- Army Combat Uniform
- Army Combat Boot
- MultiCam
- Extended Climate Warfighter Clothing System
- Army Combat Shirt
- Advanced Combat Helmet
- Improved Outer Tactical Vests

== Campaign participation credit ==
Conflict	Streamer	Year(s)
World War II	Algeria-French Morocco Campaign	1944
World War II	Rome-Arno	1944
World War II	Southern France (with Arrowhead)	1944
World War II	Rhineland	1944
World War II	Ardennes-Alsace	1944
World War II	Central Europe	1944
Vietnam War	Vietnam Defense	1965
Vietnam War	Counteroffensive, Phase I	1965–1966
Vietnam War	Counteroffensive, Phase II	1966–1967
Vietnam War	Counteroffensive, Phase III	1967–1968
Vietnam War	Tet Counteroffensive	1968
Vietnam War	Counteroffensive, Phase IV	1968
Vietnam War	Counteroffensive, Phase V	1968
Vietnam War	Counteroffensive, Phase VI	1968–1969
Vietnam War	Tet 69/Counteroffensive	1969
Vietnam War	Summer–Fall 1969	1969
Vietnam War	Winter–Spring 1970	1970
Vietnam War	Sanctuary Counteroffensive	1970
Vietnam War	Counteroffensive, Phase VII	1970–1971
Operation Iraqi Freedom	Liberation of Iraq	2003
Operation Iraqi Freedom	Transition of Iraq	2003
Operation Iraqi Freedom	Iraqi Governance	2004
Operation Iraqi Freedom	National Resolution	2005
Operation Enduring Freedom	Consolidation III	2010–2011
Operation Enduring Freedom	Transition I	2011

== Unit decorations ==
Ribbon	Award	Year	Notes
	Meritorious Unit Commendation (Army)	1966–1967	Vietnam
	Meritorious Unit Commendation (Army)	2004–2005	Iraq
	Meritorious Unit Commendation (Army)	2011	Afghanistan
