= Operation Sea Signal =

1994–96 US Caribbean naval operation

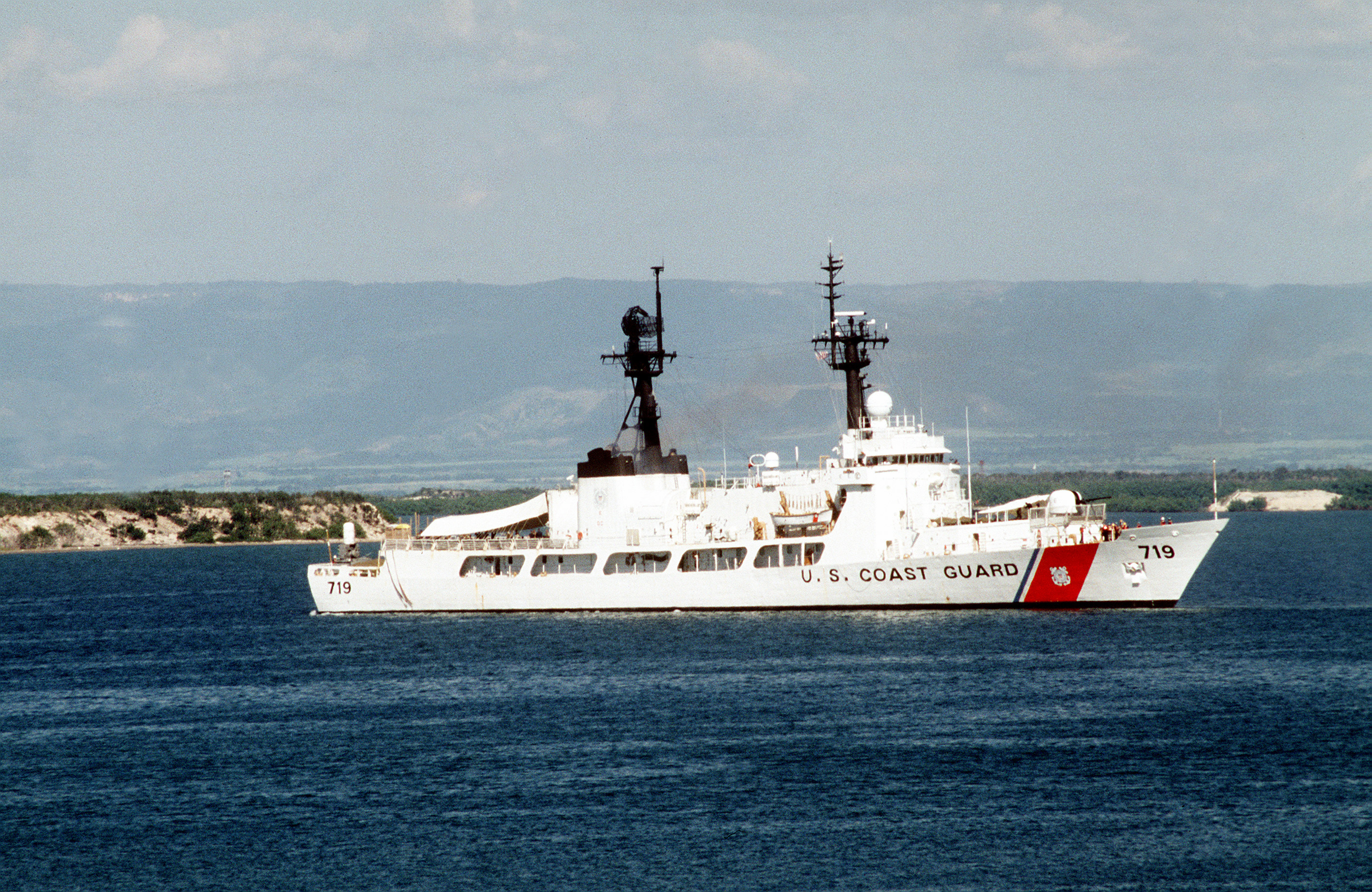
USCGC Boutwell (WHEC-719) participates in Operation Sea Signal

Operation Sea Signal was a United States Department of Defense operation in the Caribbean in response to an influx of Cuban and Haitian migrants attempting to gain asylum in the United States. As a result, the migrants became refugees at Guantanamo Bay Naval Base. The operation took place from May 1994 to February 1996 under Joint Task Force 160. The task force processed over 50,000 refugees as part of the operation. The U.S. Coast Guard and U.S. Navy rescued refugees from the sea, while other migrants attempted to cross the landmine field that then separated the U.S. and Cuban military areas. Soldiers, Airmen, and Marines provided refugee camp security at Guantanamo Bay, and ship security on board the Coast Guard cutters. This mass exodus led to the U.S. immigration implementation of the Wet Feet Dry Feet Policy. The mass Cuban exodus of 1994 was similar to the Mariel boatlift in 1980.

== Background ==
As economic, political, and social problems continued in Cuba many citizens were looking to the United States for better opportunities. These problems led to several demonstration across Cuba in early 1994. In response to anti-government demonstrations in Havana on August 5, 1994, Fidel Castro threatened to allow a mass exodus to the United States. A few days later Castro ordered his security forces not to interfere with anyone trying to leave. Almost immediately a wave of boat people known as Balseros, set out in home made rafts, boats, and inner-tubes to try to reach the United States. These devices were hastily made, overcrowded, and lacked enough food and water for the trip. The United States Military set out to help save the lives of the Balseros, and provide safety and security for them at the U.S. military base at Guantanamo Bay. Upon finding the Balseros they were rescued and boarded unto U.S. Navy, and U.S. Coast Guard vessels. Many of the boat people were already suffering from heat injuries, and many had no food or fresh water. Several young boys and girls under the age of 10 were found floating alone on inner-tubes. The children talked of their mothers or fathers being taken by sharks during the voyage. Several refugees died during the journey and numerous rafts were found completely empty or broken into several pieces. Many of the boats that had engines were out of fuel and were floating in the current.

== Operations ==
Early in the operation migrants were being transported to Key West, Florida. However, as the exodus did not abate, preparations began to quickly accommodate the large influx of migrants to the base at Guantanamo. Military dependents were sent back to the United States not only for security, but also to help alleviate the water shortages that would plague the base during the course of the Operation. Tent cities were constructed by military personnel at several sites across the windward side of the base, including Camp Alpha, Camp Bravo. Camp Golf, and Camp X-Ray. The base golf course and the McCalla airfield on the windward side were also reutilized as refugee holding camps. First established for Operation Sea Signal, notably Camp X-Ray, were reopened after the September 11 terrorist attacks to form the basis of the Guantanamo Bay detention camp.

Camp conditions were challenging due to high heat conditions, water shortages, lack of restroom facilities, and large amounts of trash. The camps were secured using fences constructed of concertina wire covered in netting and were surrounded by portable light generators. Refugees lived in tents, and slept on military issue cots. Portable restrooms were located throughout the camp, and Navy Seabees constructed concrete shower facilities within the camps. Camp security included interior camp patrols, exterior camp patrols, and fixed exterior towers.

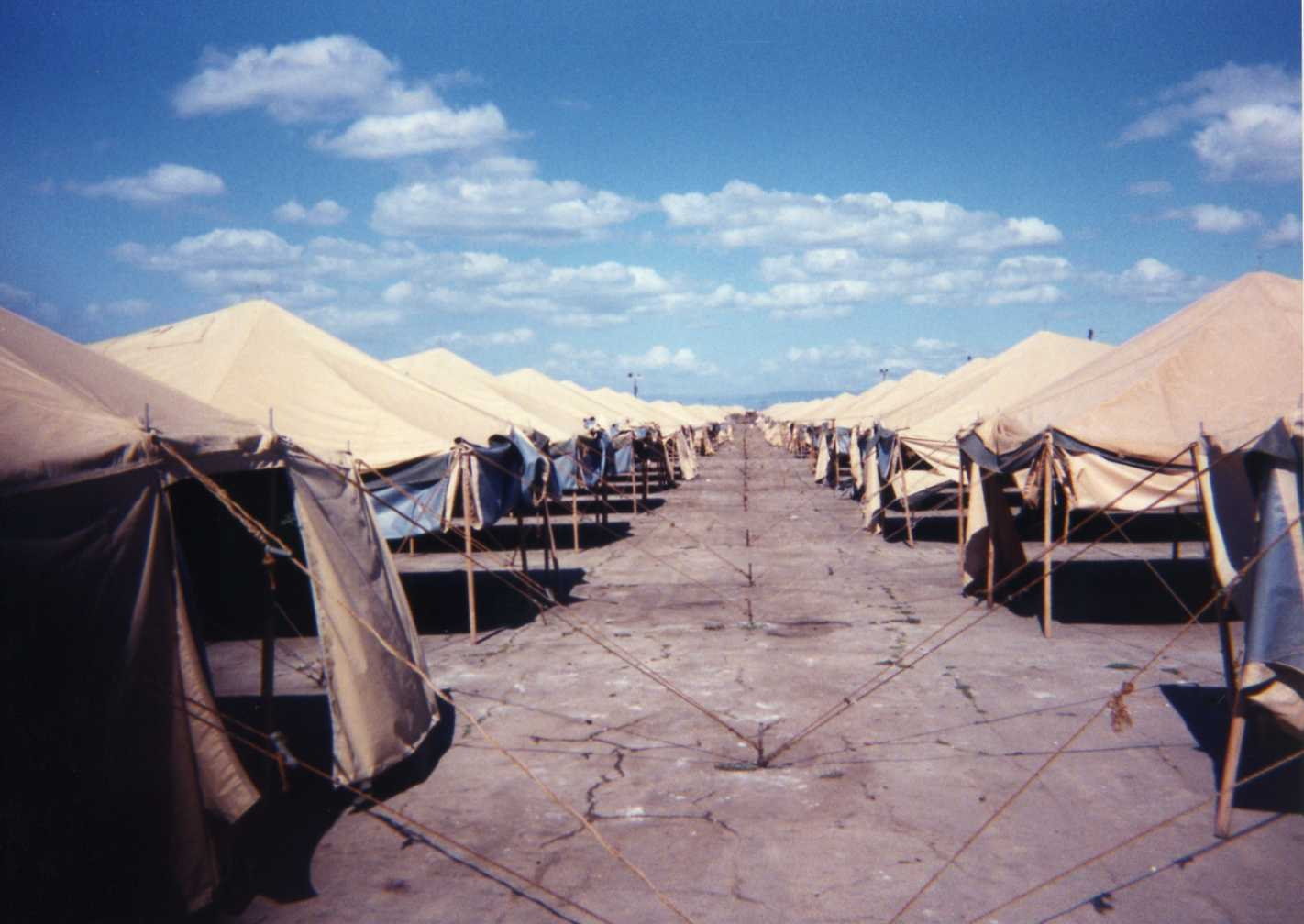
JTF160 Camp Alpha 1995

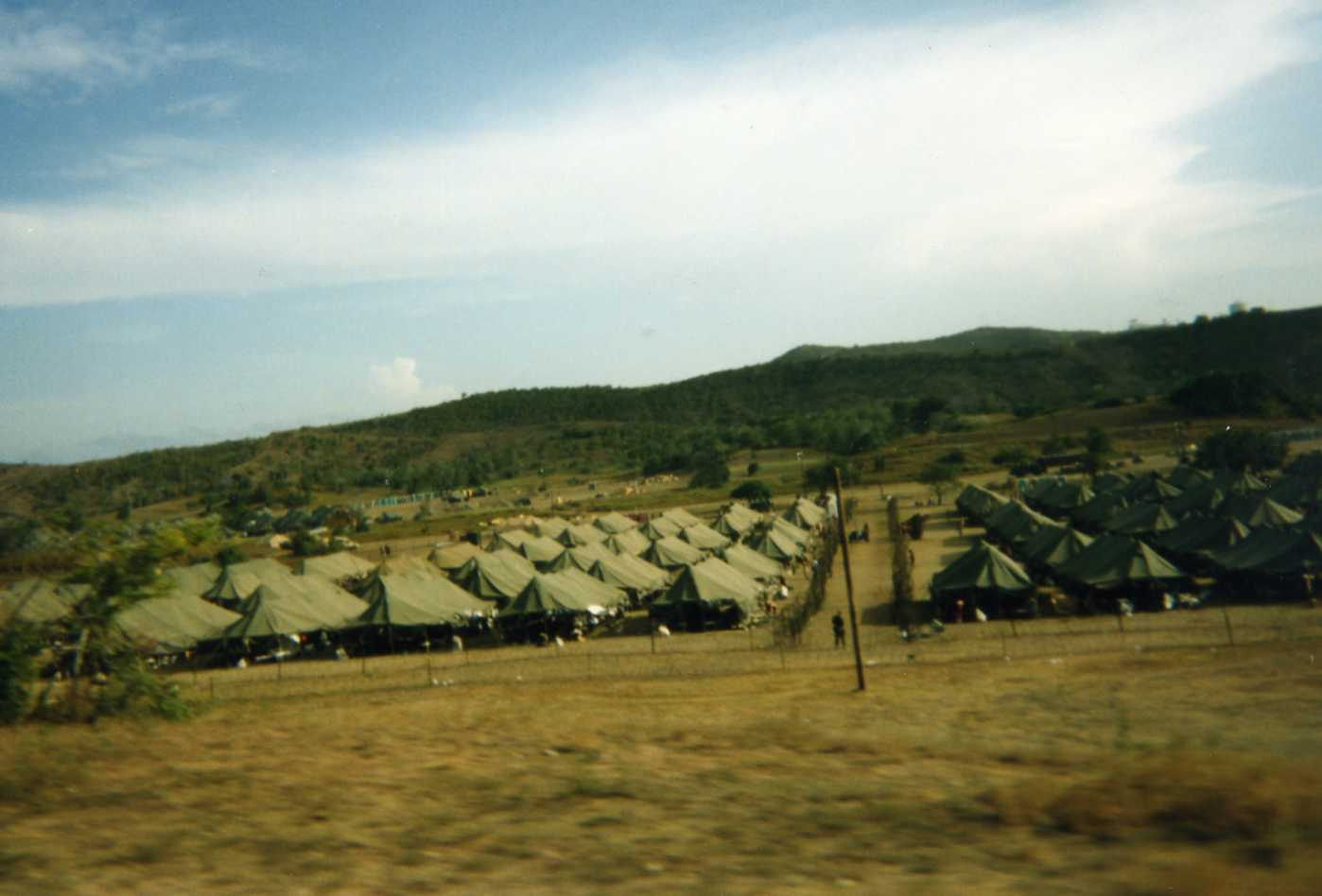
JTF-160 Camp Mike 1995

Refugees were assigned to specific camps for several different reasons. Cuban and Haitian camps were separated from each other. There were specific camps for intact families, camps for single men, and separate camps for unaccompanied minors. There were not enough unaccompanied single women to fill an entire camp, but the camps often had tents that were set aside for only them. There was also a camp located at Camp X-Ray for refugees who committed various crimes while at Guantanamo Bay. Originally there was a combined camp for all single Men and Women, however due to several problems that arose from these combined living conditions the two groups were separated.

Camp living conditions improved on a daily basis throughout the operation. All day long you could view camp soccer matches, with many different teams within each camp. In the beginning of the mission U.S. Humanitarian rations were distributed as the main meals, and then military style chow halls were added to the camps. August/September 1994 Haitian migrants rioted in protest of the plain white rice they were given to eat three times a day. The riots got violent causing many injuries to military personnel. Military personnel brought riot control gear to the deployment but were not allowed to use it as the US Army deemed the situation a humanitarian effort. Rioters threw rocks, tent poles and glass bottles of Gerber baby food during the uprisings. Meat and flavoring were added to the rice at that point. Rioting resumed after several weeks of calmness when it was purported to Haitian refugees by a news organization that the Cuban refugees on the other side of the base were being given money for being detained and Haitians were not. Artwork was constantly being created by the refugees, and the art work was displayed for the refugees, and the U.S. military to view. Several of the drawings and painting depicted the refugees travels across the Ocean, with several depictions of shark attacks.

All refugees were interviewed and screened by U.S. immigration personal deployed to the base for operations. Haitian refugees were repatriated and returned to their country under a joint agreement between Haiti and the United States. Following an agreement between the U.S. and Cuban governments exodus was once again prevented by Cuba. The Cuban refugees were allowed entry into the United States, and the camps were removed and the base returned to normal conditions.

== United States military forces ==
United States Army 39th Ordinance Company, COSCOM, Fort Bragg NC

- 1st Battalion, 12th Infantry Regiment of the 4th Infantry Division deployed to Guantanamo Bay, Cuba from 29 August 1994 - 25 February 1995 in support of Joint Task Force 160 to provide refugee camp security at Camp Alpha, Camp Bravo, Camp Golf, Camp Mike, Camp Quebec, Camp Romeo, Camp Sierra, and Camp X-Ray. This unit also served as a quick reaction force to quell any refugee uprisings, built refugee housing camp facilities, escorting refugees for medical treatment, repatriation of Haitian refugees, distribution of food and supplies, and main base security. The Regiment was housed in a tent city located on the football field of the W.T. Sampson High School. Awards for participation in Joint Task Force 160 include the Humanitarian Service Medal, and the Joint Meritorious Unit Award.

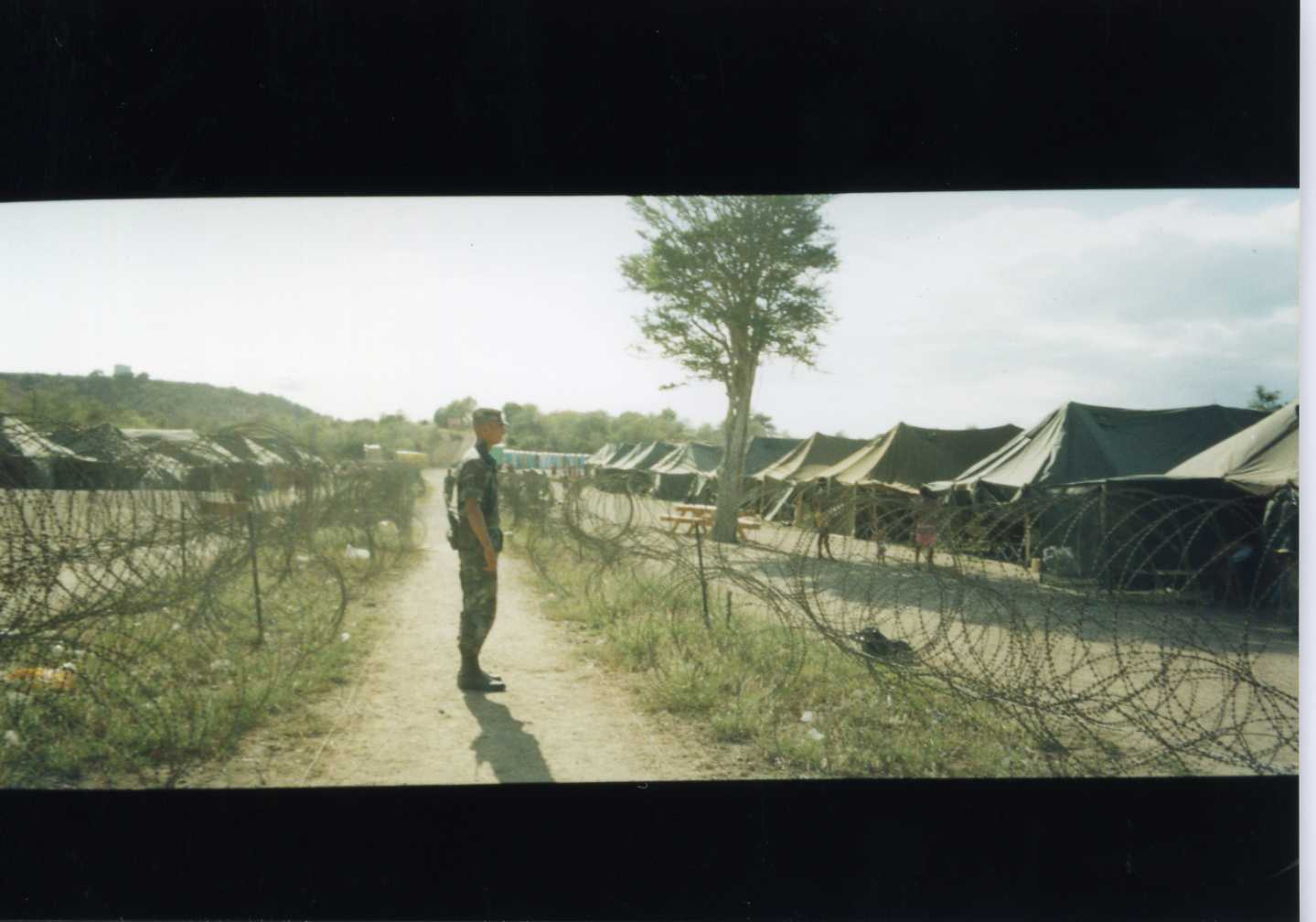
(Camp Mike) PFC. Sutherland 1/12 INF 4th ID

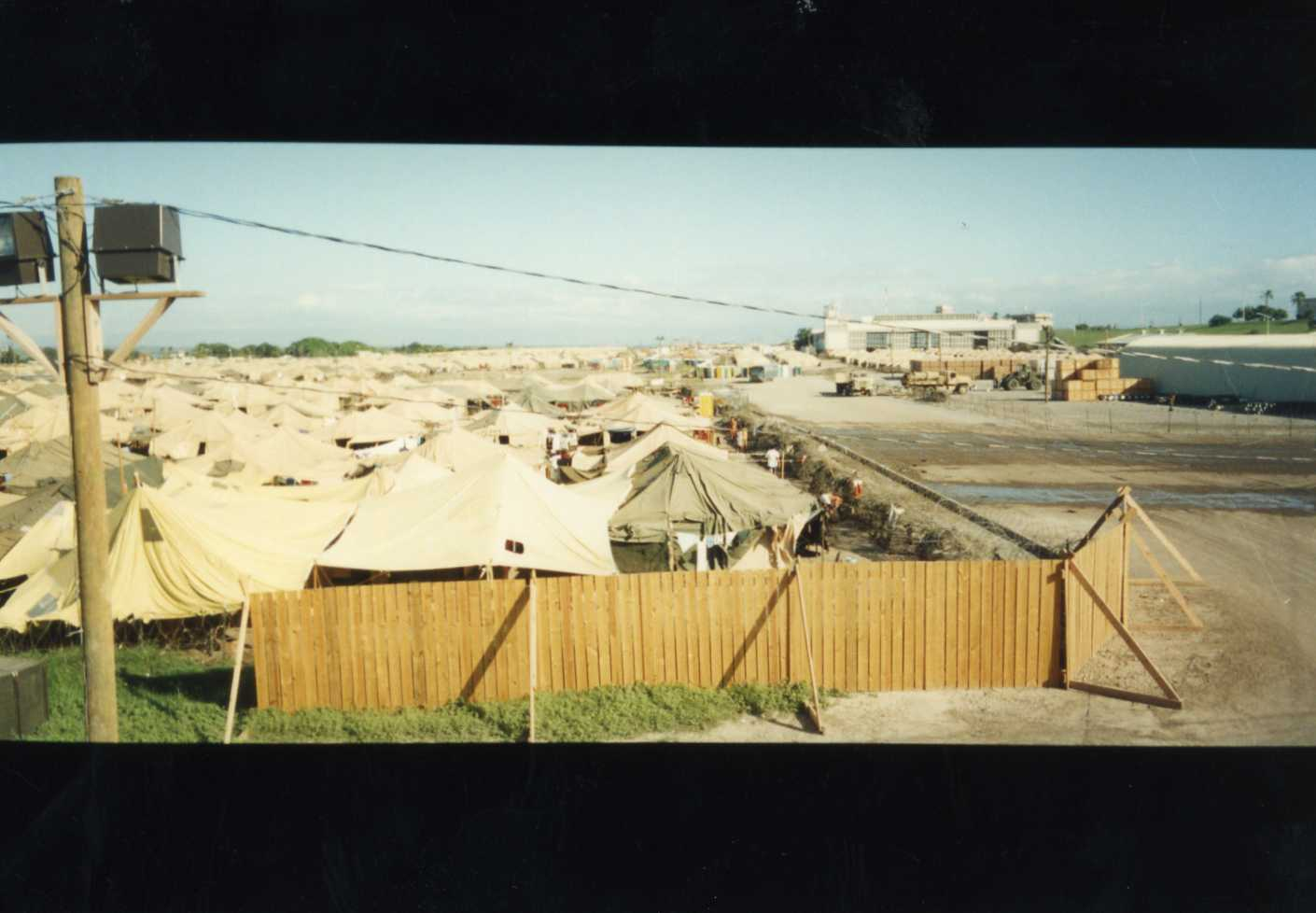
McCalla Airfield

- 9th Infantry Regimental Combat Team (L), 7th Infantry Division (L) Fort Ord, California and Fort Lewis, Washington. 2–9, "Manchus" along with augmentation from the 79th Forward Support Battalion and the 13th Engineer Company, deployed from Ft. Lewis to Guantanamo Bay, Cuba in support of Operation Sea Signal where they provided security and humanitarian assistance. Task Force 3rd Manchu as they became known returned to Ft. Lewis in June 1995. December 1994 to May 1995: C Company 3/9 was sent to Panama for operation joint task force - "Safe Haven" Cuban migrant humanitarian relief to support the 92D military police battalion
- 1st Battalion, 3rd ADA, 4th Infantry Division, Fort Carson, Colorado. 1-3 ADA with attached Alpha and Charlie Companies of the 299th Engineer Battalion deployed in early February 1995 to Guantanamo Bay to assist in the construction of four camps (Alpha, Bravo, Charlie, and Delta) on Radio Range near the southeast corner of the naval base. subsequently TF 1-3 ADA received Cuban refugees from Panama and McCalla Camps then secured and administered the new camps through the unit's redeployment to Fort Carson on 19 July. In early March 1995 TF1-3 ADA was enlarged with the attachment of the 366th Security Police Company (USAF) which assumed the internal security mission for Camp Bravo.
- 2nd Battalion, 2nd ADA (31st ADA Bde, Ft Hood TX), was tasked with quick reaction force and external security at Camp Xray
- 2nd Armored Division, 1-66th Armor, Fort Hood, Texas
- Delta Battery, 2nd Battalion, 5th ADA, 31st Air Defense Brigade, Fort Hood
- 411th Civil Affairs Battalion (Tactical)
- ARFOR 161
- 75th Field Artillery Brigade
  - 5th Battalion, 18th Field Artillery Regiment
  - 1st Battalion, 17th Field Artillery Regiment
- 89th Military Police Brigade, Fort Hood June - November 1994.
- 209th Military Police Company, Ft. McClellan Alabama. August 1994 - February 1995 Camp Romeo and Camp Tango
- 293rd Military Police Company, Ft. Stewart, Georgia. September 1994 through January 1995. Camps India, Kilo and Lima, Mag 110, Mag 291.
- 65th Military Police Company (Airborne), Ft. Bragg, North Carolina. August 1994 through December 1994. Multiple Camps
- 977th Military Police Company, Ft. Riley, Kansas. January 1995 through July 1995. Camps Kilo, Mike & X-Ray
- 300th MP Company, Ft. Leonard Wood, Missouri, September 5, 1994 - February 1, 1995. Integral to the operation.
- 293rd MP Co, Ft Meade, Oct 91 to Feb 92
- 463rd Military Police Company, Fort Leonard Wood, Missouri February 1995 - August 1995. Camp X-Ray
- 571st Military Police Company, Fort Lewis WA, November 1, 1993 - April 1, 1994 Camp Mike.
- 13th Sustainment Command (Expeditionary)
- The 43rd Sustainment Brigade is a U.S. Army Forces Command combat service support unit stationed at Fort Carson, Colorado.
- 553rd Corps Support Battalion at Fort Hood
- 24th Quartermaster Company, Fort Lewis WA, March 1995 - August 1995. Food, fuel, clean water, generators and water pumps. Moving 2+ Barges of food a week into warehouses on McCalla Hill and then onto trucks for distro to the camps.
- C Company, 61st Area Support Medical Battalion, Ft Hood TX
- 1st Battalion, 17th Infantry Regiment of the 6th Infantry Division, Fort Wainwright, Alaska deployed to Guantanamo Bay, Cuba from 11 Sept 1995 - 10 March 1996 in support of Joint Task Force 160 (Operation Sea Signal) to provide refugee camp security at Camp Alpha, Camp Bravo, Camp Charlie
- 593rd company, 11th Signal Brigade supplied communications for outbound telephony, and camp telephony

United States Marine Corps

- Marine Barracks Ground Defense/Security Force was re-designated in 2000 as Marine Corps Security Force Company.
- 2nd Battalion 4th Marines participated in Operation Sea Signal, augmented by 1st Battalion 8th Marines Weapons Company. During this deployment, over 2,500 Haitian immigrants were processed aboard the USNS Comfort (T-AH-20), CMV Ivan Franco, and CMV Griuzy. 2/4 also provided security for refugee camps aboard the U.S. Naval Base at Guantanamo Bay, Cuba during this operation.
- 1st Battalion 2nd Marines participated from August - November 1994
- 2nd Battalion 25th Marines participation from September - October 1994
- 2nd Battalion 24th Marines participation from October - November 1994
- 1st Battalion 6th Marines
- 2nd Battalion 6th Marines
- 3rd Battalion 6th Marines January - March 1995
- 1st Battalion 23rd Marines
- 3rd Battalion 2nd Marines July - October 1995
- 2nd Marine Aircraft Wing 1995
- 8th Marine Regiment- Headquarters Co., August - December 1994
- 4th Civil Affairs Group September - October 1994
- MARFOR 160
- Task Force 167
- 2nd Tank Btln TOW Platoon July - October 1994

United States Coast Guard

- USCGC Courageous (WMEC-622) First Vessel On-scene
- USCGC Gallatin (WHEC-721)
- USCGC Boutwell (WHEC-719)
- USCGC Tampa (WMEC-902)
- USCGC Forward (WMEC-911)

United States Navy

- USS Whidbey Island LSD-41 In August 1994, Whidbey Island rescued and transported over 8,100 Cuban migrants from the Straits of Florida.
- USNS Comfort (T-AH-20) Comfort was ordered to activation to serve as migrant processing center for Haitian migrants. During this mission, Comfort served as the first afloat migrant processing center. She set out for the Caribbean with a crew of 928 military and civilian personnel from various federal government and international agencies. On June 16, 1994, the first Haitian migrants were taken aboard. Over the months deployed, the population on board swelled to 1,100. Shortly after, Comfort was ordered to discontinue processing and sailed for Guantanamo Bay Naval Base, Cuba to drop off its remaining 400 migrants.
- USS Klakring (FFG-42) from Charleston, S.C. transports Cubans, who were picked up at sea, to the Naval Base at Guantanamo Bay August 1994.
- Naval Mobile Construction Battalion 74- Deployed to Guantanamo Bay, Cuba in June, 1994.
- Naval Mobile Construction Battalion 4- deployed to Guantanamo Bay, Cuba, Grand Turk Island and Panama in support of Operation Sea Signal to construct facilities for 20,000 Cuban migrants. The 35 million dollar quality of life improvement program consisted of two cities on 125 and 150-acre (0.61 km2) sites. Work included constructing 1,341 strong back tents, building 67 concrete block buildings, installing over 17 miles (27 km) of underground piping and 53 miles (85 km) of electrical cable and placing 11,700 cubic yards (8,900 m3) of concrete.
- USS Ashland (LSD 48)
- NAVFOR 165
- Task Force 165

United States Air Force

- 6th Air Transportable Hospital (ATH) was deployed from the 6th Medical Group (MacDill Air Force Base, Florida) in July 1994
- 59th Air Transportable Hospital (ATH) was deployed from the Wilford Hall U.S. Air Force Medical Center (Lackland Air Force Base, Texas) in August 1994.
- 141st Resource Management Squadron
- 81st Medical Group was deployed from Keesler AFB Medical Center starting in August 1994.
- 21st Airlift Squadron
- 21st Security Police Squadron (13-man team plus three K9 handlers; Peterson Air Force Base)
- 22d Security Police Squadron (McConnell AFB, Kansas)
- 781st Security Police Squadron
- 60th Security Police Squadron (Travis Air Force Base)
- 314th Services Squadron (Little Rock Air Force Base, Arkansas)
- 50th Airlift Squadron (Little Rock Air Force Base, Arkansas)
- 5th Combat Communications Group (Robins Air Force Base, Georgia)
- 99th Security Police Squadron, Law Enforcement Element (Nellis Air Force Base, Nevada)
- 436th APMF (aug 1995)
- 5th Civil Engineer Squadron (Minot Air Force Base) North Dakota
- 7th Civil Engineer Squadron (Dyess Air Force Base) Texas
- 1st Civil Engineering Squadron (Langley Air Force Base) Virginia
- 347 Security Police Squadron (Moody Air Force Base) Georgia
- 176th Medical Group (1 RN; Kulis Air National Guard Base, Anchorage Alaska)
- 95th Security Police Squadron, 44 person Law Enforcement Team (Edwards AFB, California) was the final United States Air Force Security Police unit to perform security duties at the McCalla Hangar and the original Camp X-ray. Upon completion of their mission in summer 1995, the mission was turned over to U.S. Marine Corps personnel.

Other

- Joint Task Force Comfort
- Joint Task Force Services Group
- Joint Logistics Support Group
- Joint Task Group Bulkeley
- Joint Task Force GTMO
- Headquarters, Joint Task Force 160
- American Red Cross

== Operations Safe Haven and Safe Passage ==
These operations by the United States Joint Task Force 160 (September 8, 1994 – March 15, 1995) to relieve the overcrowded migrant camps at Guantanamo Bay Naval Base.

Safe Haven established four camps on Empire Range, Panama to provide a safe haven for up to ten thousand Cuban migrants. Safe Passage then returned the migrants to Guantanamo after the crowded conditions could be alleviated. Camps were established in Panama as a result of an agreement between the US and Panamanian governments that permitted the Cubans to remain in Panama for six months. Cuban migrants continued to arrive until the camps reached their peak occupancy of 8,600. Of these 8,600, approximately 1,280 Cubans entered the United States in mid-October 1994 as a result of a program of parole entry by the US Department of Justice. In addition, 110 Cubans were accepted by Spain, and 10 by Venezuela.

Due in part to uncertainty about their future, some of the Cuban migrants became increasingly restless as the weeks went by. The growing tension led to disturbances and riots on December 7–8, 1994, which were quickly controlled by US military members. During the riots, more than 200 US military personnel and 30 Cubans were injured and two Cuban migrants drowned in the Panama Canal while attempting to flee from the camps. There was also considerable property damage, including the destruction of various military vehicles, computers, and telephones.

As the expiration of the US-Panamanian agreement permitting the Cubans to stay in Panama approached, planning began for Operation Safe Passage—the return of the Cubans to Guantanamo Bay Naval Facility. Between February 1, 1995, and February 20, 1995, several hundred Cubans were transported from Panama to Guantanamo Naval Base. The mission of the transfer operation was to move the Cuban migrants from Safe Haven camps in Panama to Guantanamo in a safe, orderly manner.

The 299th Engineer Battalion and the 1st Battalion, 3rd Air Defense Artillery Regiment, 4th ID, Fort Carson, Colorado was also part of Operation Sea Signal and JTF 160 from January 1995 - June 1995.

== Joint Meritorious Unit Award ==
Citation to accompany the award of the Joint Meritorious Unit Award to the Joint Task Force 160 (23 June 1995) General John Shalikashvili, USA, Chairman Joint Chiefs of Staff

From May 20, 1994, to May 19, 1995, Joint Task Force 160 in Guantanamo Bay offered humanitarian relief to Cuban and Haitian migrants. During this period, the task force intercepted at sea, evacuated, and sheltered over 50,000 migrants from the Caribbean region. The team was also responsible for coordinating multi-agency efforts to screen and transport these people to safe havens in the U.S. or to return to their respective countries of origin in Cuba and Haiti.
