= General Humphrey =

General Humphrey (not to be confused with Humphreys) may refer to:

- Charles F. Humphrey Jr. (1876–1968), U.S. Army brigadier general
- Charles Frederic Humphrey Sr. (1844–1926), U.S. Army major general
- Evan Harris Humphrey (1875–1963), U.S. Army brigadier general
