= George Dewey =

US Navy admiral (1837–1917)

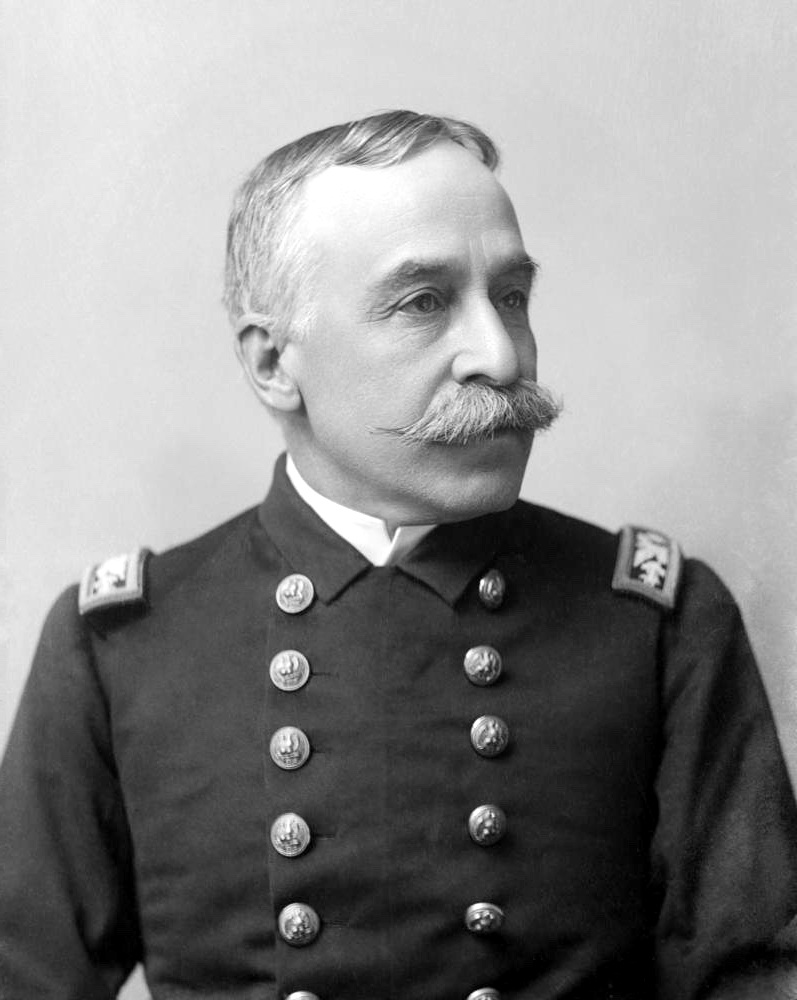
- Dewey in 1899
- Born: December 26, 1837; Montpelier, Vermont, U.S.
- Died: January 16, 1917 (aged 79); Washington, D.C., U.S.
- Burial place: Washington National Cathedral
- Education: United States Naval Academy; Norwich University
- Military career
- Allegiance: United States
- Branch: United States Navy (Union Navy)
- Service years: 1858–1917
- Rank: Admiral of the Navy
- Commands: Asiatic Squadron; General Board of the United States Navy
- Conflicts: American Civil War; Battle of Forts Jackson and St. Philip; Battle of New Orleans; Battle of Port Hudson; First Battle of Fort Fisher; Second Battle of Fort Fisher; Spanish–American War; Battle of Manila Bay; Philippine–American War; Battle of San Roque; Venezuelan crisis of 1902–1903

Signature
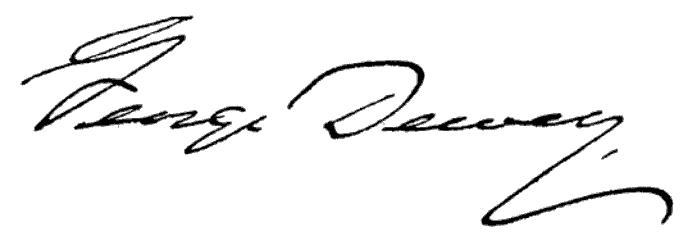

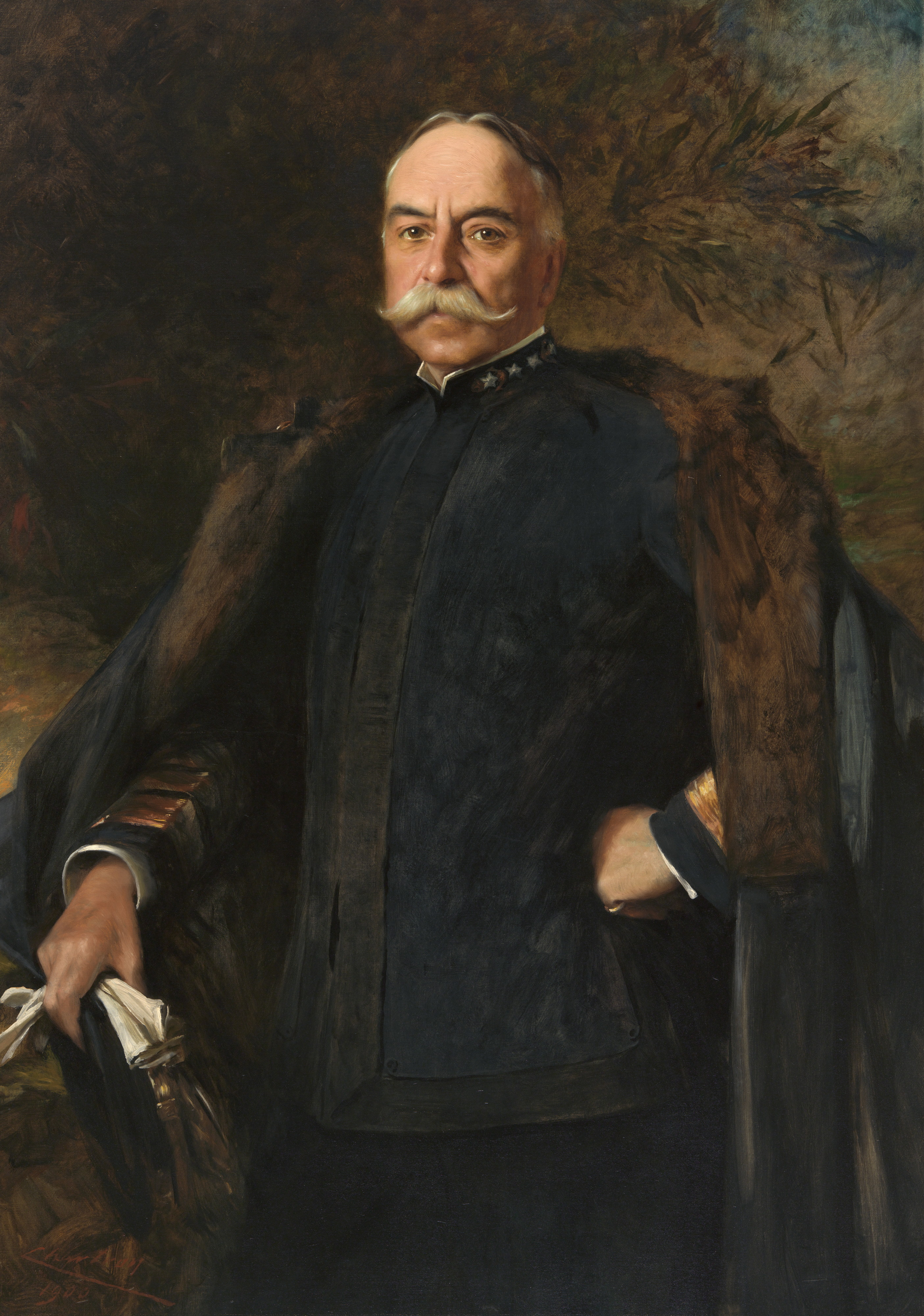
Admiral Dewey as he appears at the National Portrait Gallery in Washington, D.C.

George Dewey (December 26, 1837 – January 16, 1917) was Admiral of the Navy, the only person in United States history to have attained that rank. He is best known for his victory at the Battle of Manila Bay during the Spanish–American War, without a single combat death.

Dewey was born in Montpelier, Vermont. At age 15, Dewey's father enrolled him at Norwich University in Northfield, Vermont. Two years later Norwich expelled him for drunkenness and herding sheep into the barracks. Subsequently, he entered the United States Naval Academy in 1854. He graduated from the academy in 1858 and was assigned as the executive lieutenant of USS Mississippi at the beginning of the Civil War. He participated in the capture of New Orleans and the Siege of Port Hudson, helping the Union take control of the Mississippi River. By the end of the war, Dewey reached the rank of lieutenant commander.

After the Civil War, Dewey undertook a variety of assignments, serving on multiple ships (including USS Constitution) and as an instructor at the Naval Academy. He also served on the United States Lighthouse Board and the Board of Inspection and Survey. He was promoted to commodore in 1896 and assigned to the Asiatic Squadron the following year. After that appointment, he began preparations for a potential war with Spain, which broke out in April 1898. Immediately after the beginning of the war, Dewey led an attack on Manila Bay, sinking or capturing the entire Spanish Pacific fleet while suffering only minor casualties. After the battle, his fleet assisted in the capture of Manila. Dewey's victory at Manila Bay was widely lauded in the United States, and he was promoted to Admiral of the Navy in 1903.

Dewey explored a run for the 1900 Democratic presidential nomination, but he withdrew from the race and endorsed President William McKinley. He served on the General Board of the United States Navy, an important policy-making body, from 1900 until his death in 1917.

== Early life ==
Dewey was born in Montpelier, Vermont, on December 26, 1837, directly opposite the Vermont State House, to Julius Yemans Dewey and his first wife, Mary Perrin. Julius was a physician who received his degree from The University of Vermont. He was among the founders of the National Life Insurance Company in 1848, a member of the Episcopal Church, and was among the founders of the Christ Episcopal Church in Montpelier. George was baptized and attended Sunday school there. George had two older brothers and a younger sister.

Dewey's third cousin twice removed was Thomas E. Dewey, Governor of New York and two-time Republican Party presidential nominee.

Dewey attended school in the nearby town of Johnson. When he was fifteen years old he went to the American Literary Scientific and Military Academy. The school, better known as Norwich University, had been founded by Alden Partridge and aimed at giving cadets a well-rounded military education. Dewey attended for two years (1852–1854). Dewey found a military role model when he read a biography of Hannibal.

== Naval career ==
=== Naval Academy ===
Dewey entered the United States Naval Academy in 1854 at the age of 16. The conventional four-year course had just been introduced in 1851 and the cadet corps was quite small, averaging about one hundred Acting Midshipmen. Out of all that entered in his year, only fourteen stayed through the course. He stood fifth on the class roll at graduation. He graduated from the Academy on June 18, 1858.

=== Midshipman ===
As a midshipman, Dewey first went to sea on a practice cruise aboard USS Saratoga; on this cruise he earned recognition as a cadet officer. As a result, he was assigned to one of the best ships of the old Navy—the steam frigate USS Wabash. Wabash under Captain Samuel Barron was the new flagship of the Mediterranean Squadron. On July 22, 1858, the ship left Hampton Roads for Europe.

Wabash reached her first port of call, Gibraltar, on August 17, 1858. She cruised in the Mediterranean, and the cadet officers visited the cities of the Old World accessible to them, often taking trips inland. Dewey was assigned to keep the ship's log. Wabash returned to the New York Navy Yard on December 16, 1859, and decommissioned there on December 20, 1859. Dewey served on two short-term cruises in 1860.

=== Civil War service ===
At the beginning of the American Civil War, Dewey was executive lieutenant on USS Mississippi, a steam paddle frigate assigned to the Union West Gulf Blockading Squadron.

==== Attack on New Orleans ====
At the beginning of 1862, Mississippi was attached to David Farragut's fleet for the capture of New Orleans. On the night of April 24–25, 1862, Farragut led his ships up the Mississippi River past the Confederate defenses at Fort St. Philip and Fort Jackson. Mississippi was the third in Farragut's first division, with Dewey at the helm.

The first division (all big ships) kept near the west bank where the current was weaker and the water deeper; but this brought them right under the muzzles of the guns of Fort St. Philip. Dewey steered Mississippi through shallow water where he expected to run aground any moment.

There was a squadron of Confederate gunboats waiting above the forts. This included CSS Manassas, a small ironclad. Manassas tried to ram Mississippi, but Dewey safely maneuvered Mississippi to evade. Manassas then attacked Brooklyn and Hartford in the next division, and then turned back upriver.

Farragut signaled Mississippi to run Manassas down. Dewey steered Mississippi into a ramming attack. Manassas dodged, but ran aground and was abandoned. She was set on fire by a boat from Mississippi, and then shelled. Farragut's fleet then continued upriver and forced the surrender of the city.

This was the first battle in which Dewey distinguished himself. For the remainder of 1862, Farragut's ships (including Mississippi) patrolled the lower river. This was dangerous, as the ships were fired on by Confederate sharpshooters on the banks, and even occasionally by light artillery.

==== Battle of Port Hudson ====
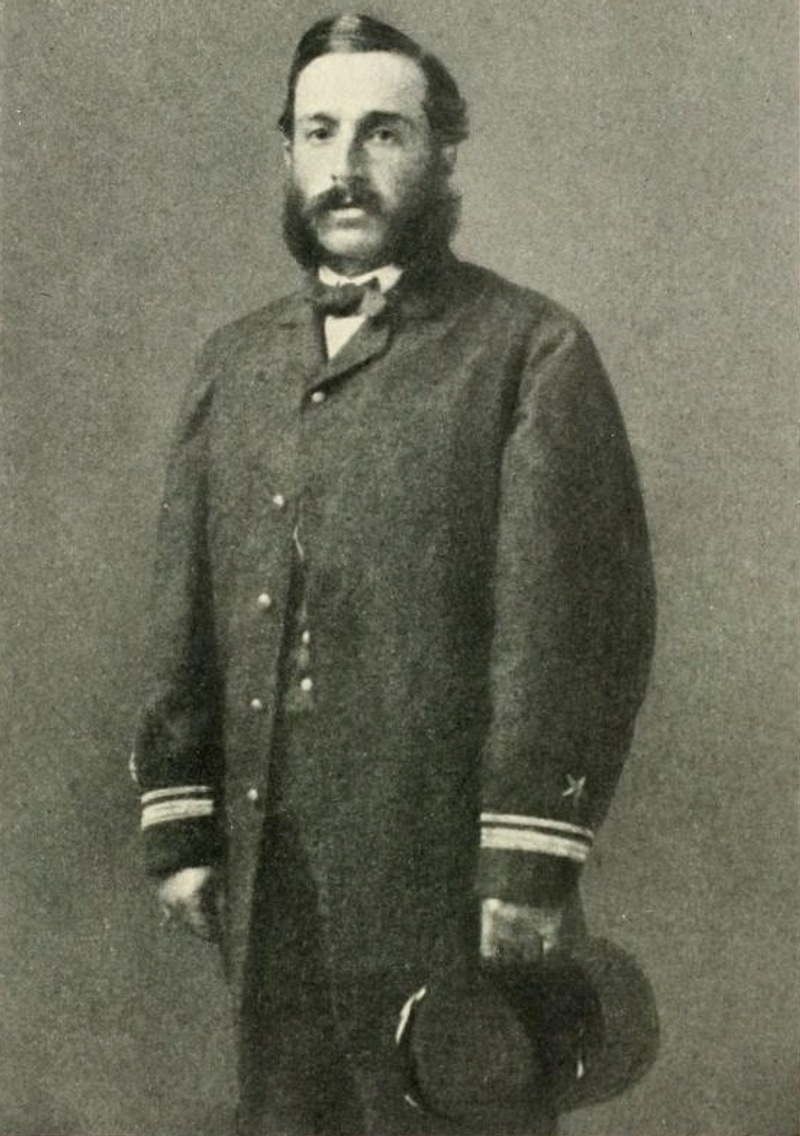
George Dewey

In spring 1863, Union forces moved to take the Confederate fortress at Port Hudson, Louisiana, where at that time the Red River joined the Mississippi. Farragut attempted to pass the fortress with his fleet and cut it off upriver, thereby completing the Siege of Port Hudson.

The attempt was made on March 14, 1863. In this action, Dewey saw fiercer fighting than he was ever to see again. Mississippi ran aground and was the target of concentrated enemy fire for half an hour, until she had to be abandoned. Dewey was among the last to leave the wreck.

=== Assignment to USS Agawam ===
Dewey was highly complimented by his immediate superiors and by Farragut himself, who appointed him executive officer of USS Agawam, a small gunboat the admiral used frequently for dispatches and his personal reconnoitering. This little vessel was frequently under fire by concealed sharpshooters and temporary batteries. In July of that year a small engagement at Donaldsonville, Louisiana, resulted in the death of Captain Abner Read, of USS New London, and the severe wounding of his executive officer. Dewey was present, and was so conspicuous for gallantry that he was recommended for promotion on the strength of it. Meanwhile, he was given temporary command of the frigate.

=== Assignment to USS Colorado ===
In the latter part of 1864, after some service in the James River under Commander McComb, Lieutenant Dewey was made executive officer of the first-rate wooden man-of-war USS Colorado, in the North Atlantic Blockading Squadron under command of Commodore Henry Knox Thatcher.

=== Battles of Fort Fisher ===
By late 1864, Wilmington, North Carolina, was the only port left to the Confederacy. Its access to the sea was protected by Fort Fisher, at the mouth of the Cape Fear River.

A joint Army-Navy attack in December failed (the First Battle of Fort Fisher, December 7–27, 1864).

A second attack came in January (the Second Battle of Fort Fisher, January 13–15, 1865). Colorado was engaged, and Dewey played a key role in her success.

Colorado, being a wooden ship, was placed in the line outside the monitors and other armored vessels but got a full share of conflict. Toward the end of the second engagement, when matters were moving the right way, Admiral Porter signaled Thatcher to close in and silence a certain part of the works. As Colorado had already received considerable damage, her officers remonstrated. But Dewey, who had now acquired marked tactical ability, was quick to see the advantage to be gained by the move and the work was taken in fifteen minutes. The New York Times, commenting upon this part of the action, spoke of it as "the most beautiful duel of the war". When Admiral Porter came to congratulate Commodore Thatcher, the latter said generously: "You must thank Lieutenant Dewey, sir. It was his move." Nevertheless, Thatcher was promoted to rear admiral. He tried to take Dewey with him as his fleet captain when he went to supersede Farragut at Mobile Bay. This was not permitted, but Dewey was promoted to lieutenant commander.

== Post–Civil War life ==
After the end of the Civil War, then Lieutenant Commander Dewey remained in active service, and was sent to the European station as executive officer of USS Kearsarge—the famous ship that had sunk the Confederate privateer Alabama.

=== Peacetime assignments ===
Dewey's next tour of duty was in 1867 and 1868 as executive officer of USS Colorado—the same vessel in which he had won his honors at Fort Fisher, and now the flagship of the European Squadron. The admiral in command of the ship and squadron was Louis M. Goldsborough, and one of Dewey's companions was John Crittenden Watson—the same man, who, as rear admiral, relieved Admiral Dewey of his duties at Manila, when he wished to return to the United States in the summer of 1899. Lieutenant Commander Dewey was in charge of the vessels at the Naval Academy in Annapolis from November 6, 1867, through August 1, 1870. This duty included commanding the famous frigate USS Constitution, which was berthed at Annapolis as a training ship.

Some tranquil years followed the end of Dewey's cruise on Colorado. For two years, from 1868 to 1870, he was an instructor at the Naval Academy. The next year he did special surveying work on the steam sloop USS Narragansett. He was then briefly assigned to the Naval Torpedo Station at Newport, Rhode Island. It was during this assignment that his wife died just after the birth of his son. In 1873, Dewey was given command of Narragansett and spent nearly four years on her, engaged in the Pacific Coast Survey.

=== Lighthouse Board ===
This entitled him to a period of rest ashore; and he was ordered to Washington, and made lighthouse inspector in 1880, and then secretary of the lighthouse board, a service in which he took great interest. Meanwhile, he had been promoted to the rank of commander. This residence in Washington as a bureau officer of high rank gave him an extensive acquaintance, and he became one of the most popular men in the capital. He was a member of the Metropolitan Club, the leading social club of Washington.

=== Assignments 1882–1896 ===
In 1882, this leave of absence in Washington came to an end when he was sent to the Asiatic station in command of USS Juniata, where he studied the situation with care and acquired information of immense importance ten years later.

He was promoted to the rank of captain in 1884, and he was ordered home and given command of USS Dolphin—one of the first four ships of the original "white squadron", steam-powered ships with steel hulls which formed the basis of the modern United States Navy. Dolphin was officially classed as a dispatch boat, and was often used as the Presidential yacht.

In 1885, Captain Dewey undertook another tour of sea service, and for three years was in command of USS Pensacola, familiar to him in the New Orleans battles, now flagship of the European squadron.

Returning to Washington in 1893, he resumed the life of a bureau officer, being attached to the lighthouse board. In 1896, he was promoted to commodore and transferred to the Board of Inspection and Survey.

== Spanish–American War ==
=== Commander of Asiatic Squadron ===
In 1896, Dewey applied for a sea posting as commander of the Asiatic Squadron. Although Dewey was a long shot for the position, his friend Theodore Roosevelt arranged for President William McKinley to select Dewey over a more senior officer. The Commodore hoisted his pennant on board USS Olympia at Nagasaki in January 1898, and departed for Hong Kong in February to inspect the U.S. warships lying in Hong Kong harbour. Upon arrival, he learned that Maine had blown up in Havana Harbor. Dewey was skeptical that the country would go to war, writing, "I don't see what we have to gain in a war with Spain." However, he was confident of victory, writing, "I expect to capture the Spanish ships and reduce the defenses of Manila in one day."

As the war clouds loomed, Dewey assembled his squadron at Hong Kong and made preparations. The cruiser USS Baltimore was dispatched to Hong Kong via the Republic of Hawaii. Dewey purchased the merchant colliers Nanshan and Zafiro, retaining their crews. The warships were repainted from white to gray. Upon the outbreak of war between the United States and Spain, the United Kingdom declared its neutrality and Dewey was ordered by Wilsone Black to leave British waters. The Asiatic Squadron moved to the Chinese waters of Mirs Bay.

=== Battle of Manila Bay ===
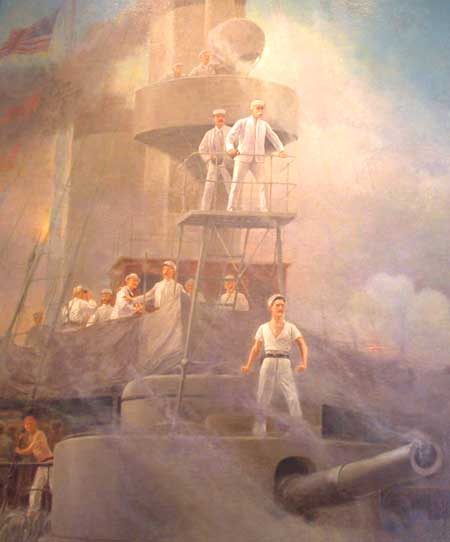
Detail of a painting in the Vermont State House depicting Dewey on USS Olympia during the Battle of Manila Bay

On April 27, 1898, Dewey sailed from China aboard USS Olympia with orders to attack the Spanish at Manila Bay. He stopped at the mouth of the bay late the night of April 30, and the following morning he gave the order to attack at first light, saying the now famous words "You may fire when you are ready, Gridley." True to his word, Dewey defeated the Spanish in a battle lasting just six hours. The Asiatic Squadron sank or captured the entire Spanish Pacific Squadron under Admiral Patricio Montojo y Pasarón and silenced the shore batteries at Manila, with the loss of only one life on the American side from a heart attack.

Didn't Admiral Dewey do wonderfully well? I got him the position out there in Asia last year, and I had to beg hard to do it; and the reason I gave was that we might have to send him to Manila. And we sent him — and he went!

— Letter from Theodore Roosevelt to William Wingate Sewall, May 4, 1898

=== Philippines ===
In the early stages of the Spanish-American War in the Philippines, Dewey and the Americans were aided by the Filipino nationalists led by Emilio Aguinaldo who had fought previously the Philippine Revolution and were attacking the Spanish by land after Dewey had defeated the Spanish at sea. There were no U.S. Army ground troops in the Philippines at the time. Dewey and Aguinaldo at first enjoyed a cordial relationship and Dewey described the Filipinos to a London Daily News reporter in 1899 as "intelligent" and well "capable of self-government." In August after ground troops arrived, Dewey aided U.S. Army General Wesley Merritt in taking possession of Manila on August 13, 1898, during the 1898 Battle of Manila, the "mock Battle of Manila", while Aguinaldo's troops, surrounding Manila, were kept out. In February 1899, the Philippine–American War started. In 1902, Dewey testified during the Lodge Committee's investigation into alleged American war crimes against Filipinos. There, Dewey seemingly reversed his previous positions, stating that "neither the Filipinos nor the Cubans are capable of self-government" and the Philippines would "lapse into anarchy" if the United States granted them full independence. Despite the clear difference between his testimony and his earlier statements, Dewey stated that his testimony reflected the opinions he always held.

== Hero ==
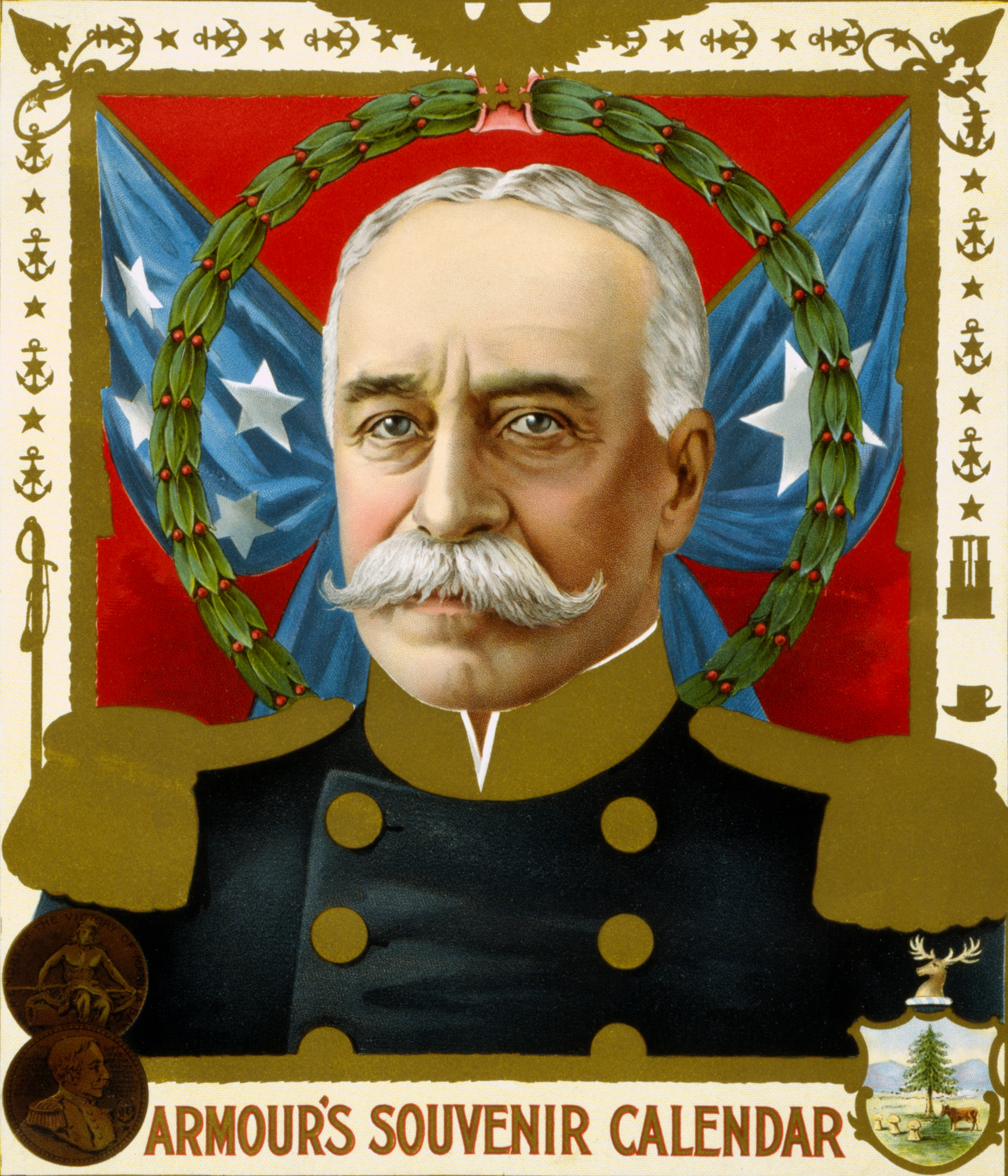
Dewey on the cover of an 1899 souvenir calendar

Dewey was promoted to rear admiral in May 1898, and full admiral the following year. Returning to the United States on September 27, 1899, Dewey received a hero's welcome. New York City's September 1899 welcome-home celebration for Dewey was a two-day parade. When Boston paid tribute, he was greeted at City Hall by 280 singers from the Handel and Haydn Society who sang the anthem "See the Conquering Hero Comes" from Handel's Judas Maccabaeus. By act of Congress, he was promoted to the special rank of Admiral of the Navy in 1903, with his date of rank retroactive to 1899.

A special military decoration, the Battle of Manila Bay Medal (commonly called the Dewey Medal), was struck in honor of Dewey's victory at Manila Bay. It was awarded to every American officer, sailor, and Marine present at the battle. The medals were designed by Daniel Chester French, sculptor of the Lincoln Memorial, and produced by Tiffany & Co. of New York. Each medal was engraved with the recipient's name, rank, and ship. Since his own image appeared on the obverse of the medal, out of modesty, Dewey wore his medal reversed. Dewey was one of only four Americans in history (the other three being Admiral William T. Sampson, Admiral Richard E. Byrd, and General John J. Pershing) who were entitled to wear a US government-issued medal with their own image on it. Such was his high regard by the public that "Dewey" was the 19th most popular boys' name in 1898, jumping from 111th the year prior.

Shortly after the Battle of Manila Bay, on May 31, 1898, Dewey wrote to the Secretary of the Navy asking that 50 Chinese sailors who had served with the Asiatic Squadron at Manila Bay be allowed to enter the United States. In Dewey's letter he noted that the Chinese had "rendered the most efficient services upon that occasion" and that they had "shown courage and energy in the face of an enemy." At that time an immigration law, the 1882 Chinese Exclusion Act, prohibited Chinese laborers from landing in the United States. Dewey had enlisted the Chinese sailors against the wishes of the Navy Department and, despite his very public entreatment that they be granted US citizenship, Congress refused to even take up the issue.

On October 3, 1899, Dewey was presented a special sword by President McKinley in a ceremony at the Capitol building. The presentation of the sword was followed by a parade down Pennsylvania Avenue. Congress, by unanimous vote, had authorized $10,000 to fund the gift shortly after the Battle of Manila Bay. The elaborately decorated sword was custom-made by Tiffany & Co. Its hilt and fittings were made of 22 carat gold. The sword is now on display, along with uniforms and medals belonging to Admiral Dewey, at the National Museum of the United States Navy at the Washington Navy Yard.

== Politics ==
Many suggested Dewey run for President on the Democratic ticket in 1900. His candidacy was plagued by public relations missteps. He was quoted as saying the job of president would be easy since the chief executive was merely following orders in executing the laws enacted by Congress and that he would "execute the laws of Congress as faithfully as I have always executed the orders of my superiors." He admitted to never having voted in a presidential election. He drew yet more criticism when he offhandedly, but prophetically, told a newspaper reporter that: "Our next war will be with Germany." Dewey also angered some Protestants by marrying a Catholic and giving her the house that the nation had given him following the war. Dewey withdrew from the race in mid-May 1900 and endorsed William McKinley.

In 1900, after his withdrawal from the presidential race, he was named president of the newly established General Board of the Navy Department, which was the Navy's major policy‑making body. He remained in active naval service on the board until his death, and played a major role in championing the introduction of new technologies into the expanding U.S. Navy with his support of the development of naval aviation and the submarine.

== Marriages and death ==
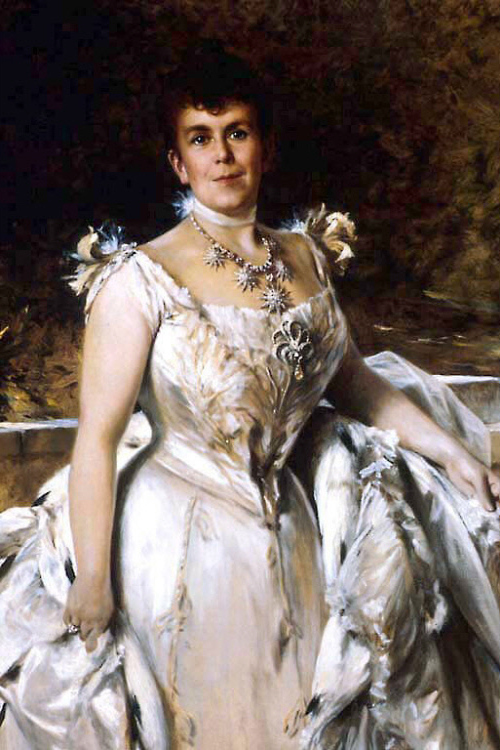
Mildred Hazen Dewey

In 1866, Dewey was assigned to duty in the Portsmouth Navy Yard in Kittery, Maine, and there met the woman who became his first wife: Susan "Susie" Boardman Goodwin (1844–1872), daughter of New Hampshire's "war governor", Ichabod Goodwin, a Republican who fitted out troops for the war at his own expense. The Deweys were married on October 24, 1867, and had one son, George. Susie died on December 28, 1872, five days after giving birth.

The longtime widower cut a dashing figure and enjoyed the company of women. In 1893, he was escorting two women aboard a warship when he unexpectedly ran into his son. Thinking on his feet, Dewey introduced his son as his younger brother.

On November 9, 1899, after his triumphal return from the Far East, Dewey was married for the second time to Mildred McLean Hazen (1850–1931), widow of General William Babcock Hazen, in the rectory of St. Paul's Catholic Church in Washington, D.C. Since Hazen was a Roman Catholic and Dewey was not, they were not permitted to have their wedding inside a Catholic church. The marriage was criticized by some anti-Catholic voices, as was Dewey's transfer to his wife of the $50,000 Washington mansion given to him by the American public through a fund-raising campaign.

In later life, Dewey wore stylish clothes and a handlebar mustache, which was his trademark. His inherited wealth allowed him to live in comfort. He often went horseback riding with President Theodore Roosevelt in Washington's Rock Creek Park, and he was a fellow member of Washington's prestigious Metropolitan Club.

For the last 17 years of his life, he resided at 1730 K Street NW, in Washington. His office was in the State, War and Navy Building adjacent to the White House.

Dewey died in Washington on January 16, 1917. After lying in state at the United States Capitol rotunda, his remains were interred at Arlington National Cemetery. A mausoleum was later built for him in the cemetery. In 1925, his widow had his remains transferred to the Bethlehem Chapel, on the crypt level, at the Washington National Cathedral, Washington, D.C.

== Memberships ==
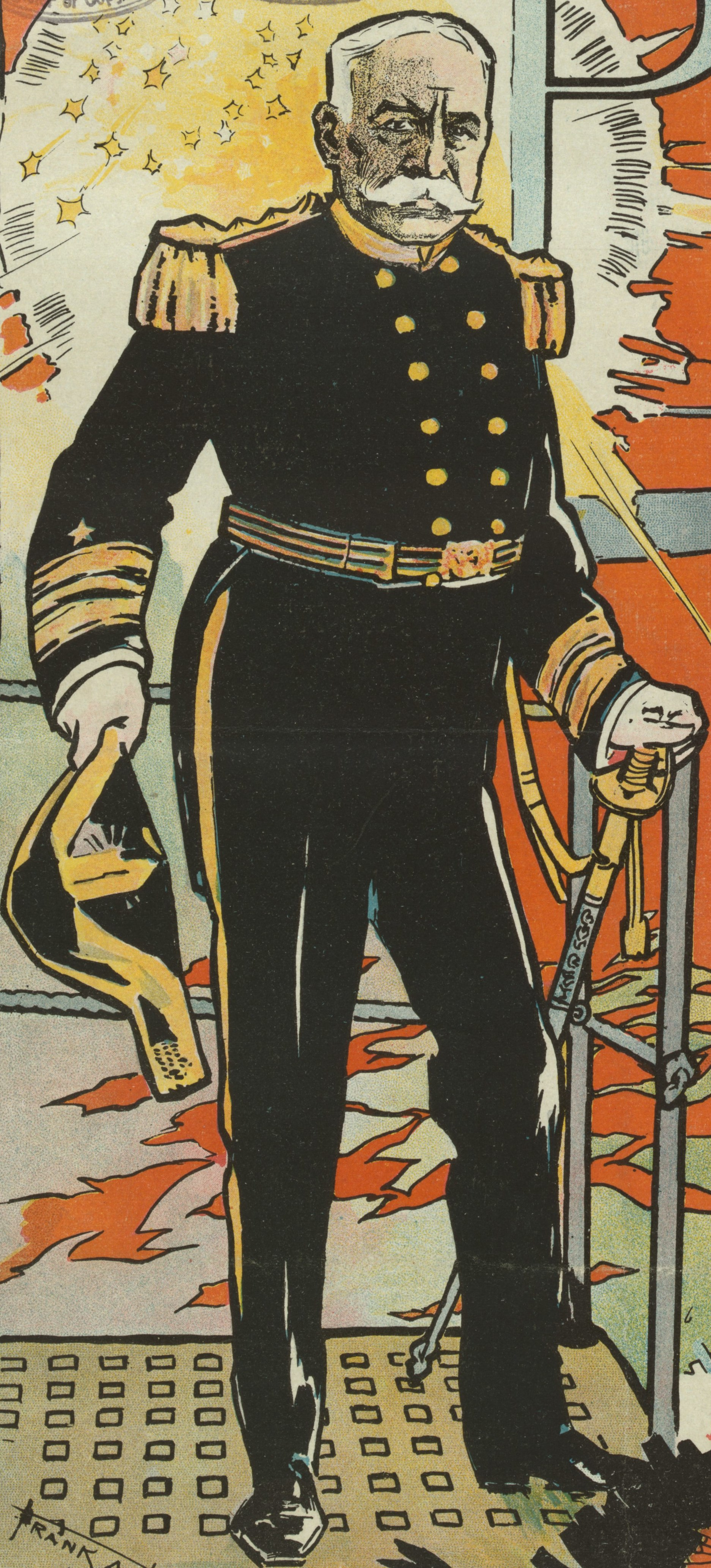
Dewey in 1899 art from Puck, which was the first successful humor magazine in the United States

Admiral Dewey belonged to numerous military, patriotic and hereditary societies.

In 1901, Admiral Dewey was elected as an honorary member of the New York Society of the Cincinnati.

In 1882, Dewey was elected as a First Class Companion of the District of Columbia Commandery of the Military Order of the Loyal Legion of the United States (MOLLUS) and was assigned insignia number 2397.

Dewey was a key leader in the Naval Order of the United States (insignia number 207). He served as Commander of the New York Commandery of the Naval Order of the United States from 1898 to 1900, and as Commander General (i.e., National President) of the Order from 1907 to 1917.

He was also a member of the Pennsylvania Society of the Order of the Founders and Patriots of America (state member number 93 and national member number 552; he served as fifth Governor General from 1904 to 1906 and as its seventh Governor General from 1906 to 1908), the New York Society of the Sons of the Revolution (elected as a life member in 1899), the Vermont Society of the Sons of the American Revolution (joined in 1892, state member number 220 and national member number 2920), the Vermont Society of Colonial Wars (insignia number 2663), the New Jersey Society of the General Society of the War of 1812 (state membership number 15), the Society of American Wars (Vice Commander General), and the Pennsylvania Commandery of the Military Order of Foreign Wars (insignia number 363).

Dewey's membership insignia for most of the societies listed above are in the collection of the National Museum of the United States Navy at the Washington Navy Yard.

Dewey was an early member of the board of directors of the Boy Scouts of America, serving until his resignation from that office in late 1910.

== Dates of rank ==
- Acting Midshipman, United States Naval Academy: September 23, 1854
- Warranted Midshipman: June 11, 1858

In the mid to late-18th Century, the US Navy had three "ranks" of Midshipmen serving: "acting midshipmen" who were active students at the US Naval Academy, "warranted midshipmen" who had completed most of their studies at the Academy and were serving at sea while holding line authority through a warrant of authority, and "passed midshipmen" who had completed all requirements for commissioning and held warranted line authority similar to ensigns of the modern US Navy. In the era of the Civil War, it was a common practice for officers to serve as a "Master" with a warrant of authority until they were commissioned. It was also common for officers to be granted shipboard commissions based on the need to fill certain jobs or billets. Dewey was therefore made a lieutenant once he "signed on" with David Farragut. He never held the ranks of ensign or lieutenant (junior grade) as those ranks were not created until 1862 and 1883, respectively. Nor was he appointed to the rank of vice admiral, there being no actively serving vice admirals in the US Navy at that time.

Passed Midshipman	Master	Lieutenant	Lieutenant Commander	Commander
O-1	O-2	O-3	O-4	O-5
January 19, 1861	February 28, 1861	April 19, 1861	March 3, 1865	April 13, 1872

Captain	Commodore	Rear Admiral	Admiral	Admiral of the Navy
O-6	O-7	O-8	O-10	Special Rank
September 27, 1884 (Retroactive to July 28, 1884)	February 28, 1896	May 11, 1898	March 8, 1899	March 24, 1903 (Retroactive to March 2, 1899)

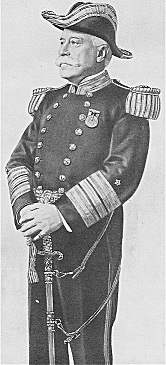
Dewey in special full dress uniform as Admiral of the Navy

Admiral Dewey's final rank was Admiral of the Navy, making him the highest-ranking officer in the history of the United States Navy. He is the only person ever to hold this rank. Admiral of the Navy is equivalent to General of the Armies. General John J. Pershing, US Army, was promoted to General of the Armies in 1919, Lieutenant General George Washington, US Army, was posthumously promoted on the Retired List of the US Army to the rank of General of the Armies of the United States, with an effective date of rank of July 4, 1776, and General Ulysses S. Grant also received a posthumous promotion on December 27, 2022.

Admiral Dewey served a total of 62 years on active duty in the U.S. Navy. This was just one year less than Admiral Hyman G. Rickover.

== Honors ==
=== Medals awarded by the U.S. government ===
(Dates indicate the year the medal was awarded.)

- Civil War Campaign Medal (1908)
- Battle of Manila Bay Medal (aka. "Dewey Medal") (1899)
- Spanish Campaign Medal (1908)
- Philippine Campaign Medal (1908)

Note – Although Dewey was entitled to all of the above medals, he is pictured at right wearing only the Battle of Manila Bay Medal. He wore the medal with the reverse side showing because his profile was on the obverse side. (He was one of only four officers in American military history entitled to wear a medal with his own image on it.) He is wearing the special additional gold braid on his sleeves denoting his unique rank as Admiral of the Navy.

== Legacy ==
=== Namesakes ===
- Dewey International Elementary School, Saint Louis, Missouri.
- Dewey Point, Yosemite National Park, California, appeared on the first edition of the Yosemite Valley map in 1907
- Dewey Hall, an academic building at Norwich University, was constructed in 1899, in honor of his victory at Manila Bay.
- In 1898, the Borough of Hellertown, Pennsylvania, formed its fire department naming it Dewey Fire Company No. 1 in honor of George Dewey.
- Also in 1898, the city of Boston, Massachusetts, named the square besides the nearly complete South Central Station as Dewey Square in his honor.
- Four vessels of the United States Navy have borne the name Dewey, including the Arleigh Burke-class destroyer Dewey, laid down on October 4, 2006, launched on January 26, 2008, and commissioned on March 6, 2010.
- Dewey Hall and Dewey Field at the United States Naval Academy in Annapolis, Maryland.
- Dewey Field at Naval Station Newport in Newport, Rhode Island.
- Thomasville, Georgia, contains the Dewey City subdivision, an area settled in the late 1880s by former slaves.
- The Dewey Monument column in the center of San Francisco's Union Square is dedicated to Dewey's victory at Manila Bay.
- Dewey Beach, Delaware, is named in honor of Admiral Dewey.
- Dewey Street, in St. Paul, Minnesota, was renamed in his honor.
- Dewey Avenue in Norman, Oklahoma, was named in his honor.
- City of Dewey, Oklahoma, was named in his honor. Founded in 1899 by Jacob A. Bartles.
- Dewey County, Oklahoma, was named in his honor.
- In 1899, Mills Novelty released a slot machine named The Dewey, in honor of Admiral Dewey.
- The main town of Culebra, Puerto Rico, was named in his honor, however it is known by many locals simply as Pueblo.
- The Dewey School in the Castle Rock Business Corridor in Castle Rock, Colorado, was named after Admiral Dewey. The Admiral wrote a warm letter of thanks to the school children that was framed and on the wall of the school for many years until the school closed.
- Dewey Avenue in Rochester, New York. In 1898, Alderman Selye of the 10th Ward, proposed to rename the street that formed the park’s eastern boundary–known simply as The Boulevard to Dewey Avenue. The motion, intended to honor the recent victory of Admiral George Dewey in the Spanish-American War, met with unanimous approval.
- Dewey Avenue in Wharton, New Jersey, is named in honor of Admiral Dewey.
- Dewey Blvd, now known as Roxas Blvd, a major seaside thoroughfare in Manila, Philippines, was named after him.
- George Dewey High School at the former U.S. Naval Base Subic Bay in the Philippines was named after him.
- A settlement in Newton County, Texas, was established as a sawmill site by the Sabine Tram Company in 1898. It was named Deweyville after George Dewey.
- Dewey Lake, a lake in St. Louis County, Minnesota, is named after Admiral Dewey.
- The tugboat Admiral Dewey was named for him.
- Dewey Road at the former Naval Training Center San Diego in the heart of San Diego's new Civic, Arts and Cultural District is named for him.
- George Dewey Elementary School, located near the former Naval Training Center San Diego, was named in his honor. Over the years, it has served a student body largely made up of children of Navy and Marine personnel.
- Dewey-Humboldt, Arizona, is named in honor of Admiral Dewey.
- George Dewey Junior High School was in Bremerton, Washington, until 1977 when it was razed and replaced by Mountain View Middle School.
- The World War II Liberty Ship SS George Dewey was named in his honor.
- George Dewey Medical and Wellness Center, Morong, Bataan Philippines.
- In 1922, Judson Kilpatrick Square in Harlem, New York was renamed for Dewey. The Charlie Parker Quintet named a song after it in 1947. It was renamed again to A. Philip Randolph Square in 1964.

=== Other ===
- Admiral Dewey March, a patriotic march named after him.
- Admiral Dewey's service sword (not to be confused with the special presentation sword he received in 1899) is on display in the wardroom of the guided missile destroyer USS Dewey (DDG-105).

== See also ==
- Five-star rank

== Notes ==
- Dates of promotion from The Records of Living Officers of the U.S. Navy and Marine Corps, Sixth Edition, 1889, by Lewis Randolph Hamersly.
- The Dewey slot machine at Arcade-History.com.
- Yosemite Place Names – The historic background of geographic names in Yosemite National Park by Peter Browning.

Military offices
Preceded by Frederick V. McNair, Sr.	Commander, Asiatic Squadron; January 3, 1898 – June 5, 1899	Succeeded by John C. Watson

Preceded by Newly created	Member of the Schurman Commission; March 4, 1899 – March 16, 1900	Succeeded by Luke Edward Wright (Taft Commission)
Honorary titles
Preceded by Pierre Charles L'Enfant	Persons who have lain in state or honor in the United States Capitol rotunda January 20, 1917	Succeeded by Unknown Soldier of World War I
