= Julius Yemans Dewey =

American businessman and medical doctor (1801–1877)

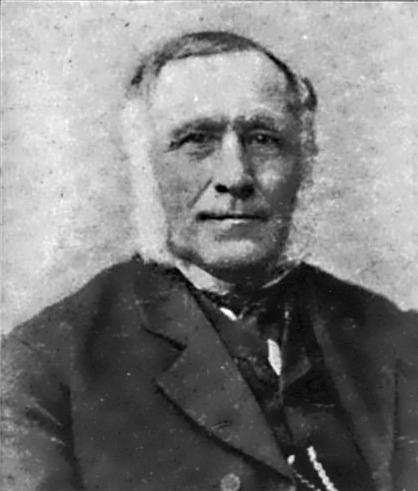
- Born: August 22, 1801; Berlin, Vermont, U.S.
- Died: May 29, 1877 (aged 75); Montpelier, Vermont, U.S.
- Spouses: Mary Perrin (m. 1825; died 1843) Susan Edson Tarbox (m. 1845; died 1854): Susan Elizabeth Griggs Lilley
- Scientific career
- Workplaces: University of Vermont

Julius Yemans Dewey (August 22, 1801 – May 29, 1877) was an American doctor of medicine and businessman in the state of Vermont.

He was a founder of the Christ Episcopal church of Montpelier. He served as a trustee of Norwich University. He was a founder of and later president of the National Life Insurance Company and he personally delivered the remittance for the company's first claim, prompting a public thank-you from the surviving family.

He served as a surgeon for the First Regiment of the Vermont State Militia. One of his sons was USN Admiral of the Navy and hero of the Spanish–American War George Dewey.

== Early life and family ==
Julius Yemans Dewey was born in Berlin, Vermont on August 22, 1801, to Simeon Dewey (1770–1863) and his wife Prudence Yemens (1772–1844). They were married on February 27, 1794. A concise life of Admiral George Dewey (1899) by William J. Lawrence mentions his parents briefly. "His son Simeon was the admiral's grandfather—Captain Simeon Dewey, born at Hebron, Connecticut, in 1770, who married Prudence Yemans in 1794. When the time came to strike out for himself he chose to settle in Berlin, Vermont, four miles from Montpelier, the capital, where he prospered and survived to the age of ninety-three. Among his sons was one, Julius Yemans, born in 1801, who turned to books rather than to the ax and plow of the farmer of three-quarters of a century ago, and became exceptional among his fellows by that ambition."

Julius attended Washington County Grammar School and then the University of Vermont.

His first wife and the mother of his children was Mary Perrin, whom he married on June 9, 1825. She died young however, on September 3, 1843, and he had two later marriages without issue, to Susan Edson Tarbox in 1845, and Susan Elizabeth Griggs Lilley c. 1857.

== Career ==
Lawrence continues by giving a life account of Julius. "While still very young he began to teach school in Montpelier, but only as a means to further schooling for himself. By that thrift which so often accompanies and makes most serviceable the natural energy of the New Englander, the young schoolmaster was saving money in order to educate himself as a physician. This he succeeded in doing, was graduated from the University of Vermont, and became the most prominent practitioner and one of the leading citizens of the capital of Vermont."

At the age of twenty-four young Dr. Dewey went to his home neighborhood for a wife and married the beautiful Mary Perrin, his boyish sweetheart. That neighborhood then, as now, was practically divided between the Deweys and the Perrins, and two lines of good stock and common tradition and interest were united by this local and friendly marriage. They at once made their residence in Montpelier, and there were born their four children, Charles, Edward, George and Mary.

Dr. Julius Dewey was known everywhere for his strong sense of duty and integrity. He was universally trusted. No one can look at the broad, honest face with its high forehead, firm mouth and square chin, without feeling that it is the countenance of a man who would do his duty fearlessly; and no one can look at the kindly eyes, with a twinkle even in the little wrinkles about their corners, without recognizing the cheery humor which was perhaps the strongest characteristic of the man. The doctor was always for looking on the bright side of things, and this good cheer was worth more, no doubt, to his patients than were his medicines. He had excellent judgment, and prospered until he soon became one of the wealthy men of his town. At the age of fifty he had saved a considerable fortune, and in order to invest it to good advantage he formed the National Life Insurance Company, which is now the most important corporation in central Vermont, and is still a source of wealth to the family. Until his death in 1877 he was its president. Then his son Charles became its presiding officer, and another son, Edward — the eldest of the family — became and remains a leading director.

According to "Wish You Were Here" (1999), an article on towns of Vermont and their history by Craig Bailey, the company was founded in 1850 and was still active by the end of the 20th century. "It's one of the 10 oldest insurance companies in the country [United States] and one of the largest private employers in Montpelier. Founded by Vermont doctor Julius Dewey in 1850, the company has more than a quarter-million policyholders served by 3,500 brokers and agents in all 50 states and the District of Columbia."

"Dr. Dewey was a deeply religious man, worshiping according to the forms of the Episcopal denomination. He was the founder of Christ Church, in Montpelier". ... "One of the habits of the household was the Sunday evening singing at home after church, led by the doctor himself; for he was fond of all music, and possessed an excellent voice." ... "It is not surprising also to learn that Dr. Dewey was fond of poetry, and that Burns, the balladist of rural life and the most cheerful of philosophers, was his favorite. Cowper was another poet often read."

"Dewey and Other Naval Commanders" (1899) by Edward Sylvester Ellis contains a shorter but similar account. "Following down the family line, we come to the birth of Julius Yemans Dewey, August 22, 1801, at Berlin, Vermont. He studied medicine, practiced his profession at Montpelier, the capital, and became one of the most respected and widely known citizens of the State. He was married three times, and by his first wife had three sons and one daughter. The latter was Mary, and the sons were Charles, Edward, and George". ... "Dr. Dewey was a man of deep religious convictions. In middle life he gave up the practice of medicine and founded the National Life Insurance Company, to whose interests he devoted his time and ability, and met with a good degree of success."

According to Lawrence, Dewey was a member of the local school committee when his son George was eleven-years-old (c. 1848). When teacher Z. K. Pangborn complained about the son's behavior at school, Julius was not particularly impressed. "'If you can't manage that eleven-year-old boy you'd better resign your position,' replied the doctor grimly."

== Education of George ==
Ellis expands on the role Julius and Pangborn played in the education of George Dewey. "An incident is related by Z.K. Pangborn, the well known editor of New Jersey, who took charge of the Montpelier school, in which George Dewey was a pupil. The school was notorious for the roughness of a number of its pupils, who had ousted more than one instructor and welcomed the chance to tackle a new one. Master Dewey [George] was the ringleader of these young rebels, and chuckled with delight when the quiet-looking, ordinary-sized teacher sauntered down the highway to begin his duties in the schoolroom."

At the time of the gentleman's appearance George was sitting astride of a big limb in a tree at the side of the road, his pockets bulging with stones, which he was hurling with unpleasant accuracy at every one who came within range. Several youngsters were howling from having served as targets to the urchin up the tree, and as soon as Mr. Pangborn saw how things were going he shouted to Dewey to stop his sport. The boy replied by advising the teacher to go to the hottest region named in works on theology, and, descending the tree, led several young scamps in an attack upon the instructor. There was a lively brush, in which it cannot be said that either party was the victor.

A drawn battle is always unsatisfactory to two armies, and George determined to have it out in the schoolroom with the teacher, who, expecting the struggle, had prepared for it and was as eager as the boys for the fight. As before, Dewey was the leader in the attack on the pedagogue, who was wiry, active, and strong. He swung his rawhide with a vigor that made Dewey and the others dance, but they pluckily kept up the assault, until the instructor seized a big stick, intended to serve as fuel for the old-fashioned stove, and laid about him with an energy that soon stretched the rebels on the floor. Then how he belabored them! As fast as one attempted to climb to his feet he was thumped back again by the club that continually whizzed through the air, and if a boy tried to stay the storm by remaining prone, the instructor thumped him nonetheless viciously. Indeed, matters had got to that point that he enjoyed the fun and was loath to let up, as he felt obliged to do, when the howling rebels slunk to their seats, thoroughly cowed and conquered. George Dewey was the most battered of the lot and made a sorry sight. In fact, he was so bruised that his teacher thought it prudent to accompany him to his home and explain to his father the particulars of the affray in school. Mr. Pangborn gave a detailed history of the occurrence, to which Dr. Dewey listened gravely. When he understood everything, he showed his good sense by thanking the teacher for having administered the punishment, asking him to repeat it whenever the conduct of his son made it necessary.

This chastisement marked a turning point in the boy's career. He did a good deal of serious thinking throughout the day, and saw and felt his wrongdoing. He became an attentive, obedient pupil, and years after, when grown to manhood, he warmly thanked Mr. Pangborn for having punished him with such severity, frankly adding: "I believe if you hadn't done so I should have ended my career in the penitentiary." Dr. Dewey wished to give George a career in the army, and he sent him to Norwich University, a military training school, in order to fit him for the Military Academy at West Point. George's tastes, however, were for the navy, and after much pleading with his father he brought him to his way of thinking. The utmost that Dr. Dewey could do was to secure the appointment of his son as alternate, who, as may be understood, secures the appointment only in the event of the principal failing to pass the entrance examination. In this case the principal would have passed without trouble, and, to quote an ordinary expression, George Dewey would have been "left," had not the mother of the other boy interposed at the critical moment. Under no circumstances would she allow her son to enter the navy. He was compelled to give up all ambition in that direction and to take up the study of theology. At this writing he is a popular preacher, who will always believe it was a most providential thing for our country that turned him aside from blocking the entrance of George Dewey to the Naval Academy at Annapolis.

Ellis does not name the other candidate for the Naval Academy. Lawrence identifies him as George B. Spalding.

== Death ==
Julius Yemans Dewey died from heart disease at his home in Montpelier on May 29, 1877.
