= Christ Episcopal Church (Montpelier, Vermont) =

Coordinates: 44.261475°N 72.577615°W

- Christ Episcopal Church (Montpelier, Vermont) (Vermont)

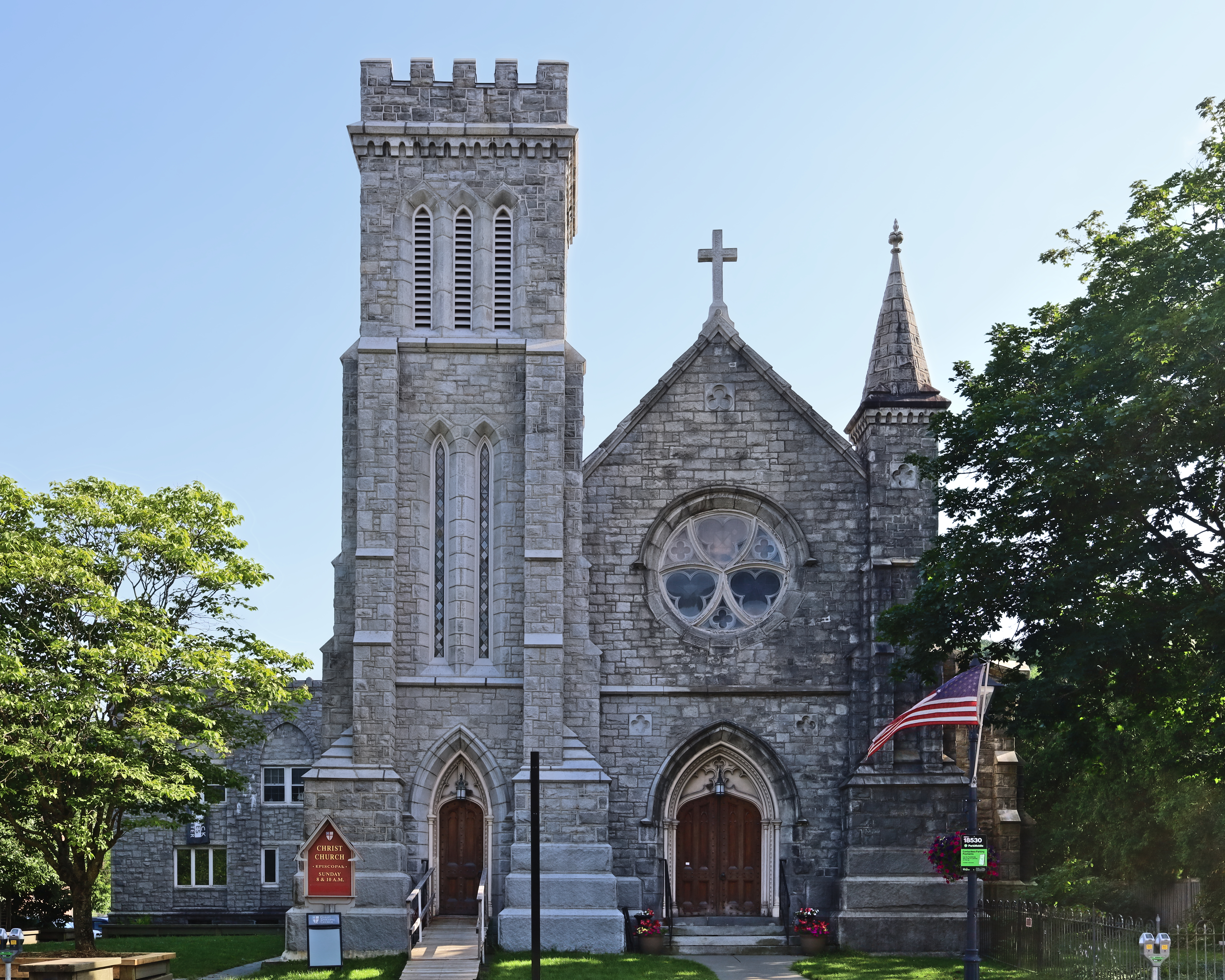
- Christ Episcopal Church
- Christ Episcopal Church
- Location: 64 State Street, Montpelier, Vermont
- Country: United States
- Denomination: Episcopal
- Website: www.christchurchvt.org

Architecture
- Years built: 1840

Administration
- Diocese: Episcopal Diocese of Vermont

Clergy
- Rector: vacant

Christ Episcopal Church is a historic church located at 64 State Street in Montpelier, Vermont in the United States. It was founded in 1840. Among its founders was Dr. Julius Yemans Dewey, local physician, founder of Vermont's National Life Insurance Company, and father of Spanish–American War hero Admiral George Dewey.

The church's organs have been the topic of extensive research by Stephen L. Pinel in The Diapason.

== See also ==
- Christ Episcopal Church (disambiguation) for other churches of the same name
