= General Humphreys =

General Humphreys (not to be confused with Humphrey) may refer to:

- Andrew A. Humphreys (1810–1883), Union Army major general
- Benjamin G. Humphreys (1808–1882), Confederate States Army brigadier general
- Thomas Humphreys (British Army officer) (1878–1955), British Army lieutenant general
