= 94th New York Infantry Regiment =

- Active: October 1861 to July 18, 1865
- Country: United States
- Allegiance: Union
- Branch: Infantry
- Nickname(s): Bell Rifles or Bell Jefferson Rifles
- Engagements: Battle of Cedar Mountain; Second Battle of Bull Run; Battle of Chantilly; Battle of South Mountain; Battle of Antietam; Battle of Fredericksburg; Battle of Chancellorsville; Battle of Gettysburg; Bristoe Campaign; Mine Run Campaign; Battle of Totopotomoy Creek; Battle of Cold Harbor; Siege of Petersburg; Battle of Globe Tavern; Battle of Hatcher's Run; Appomattox Campaign; Battle of Five Forks; Third Battle of Petersburg; Battle of Appomattox Court House

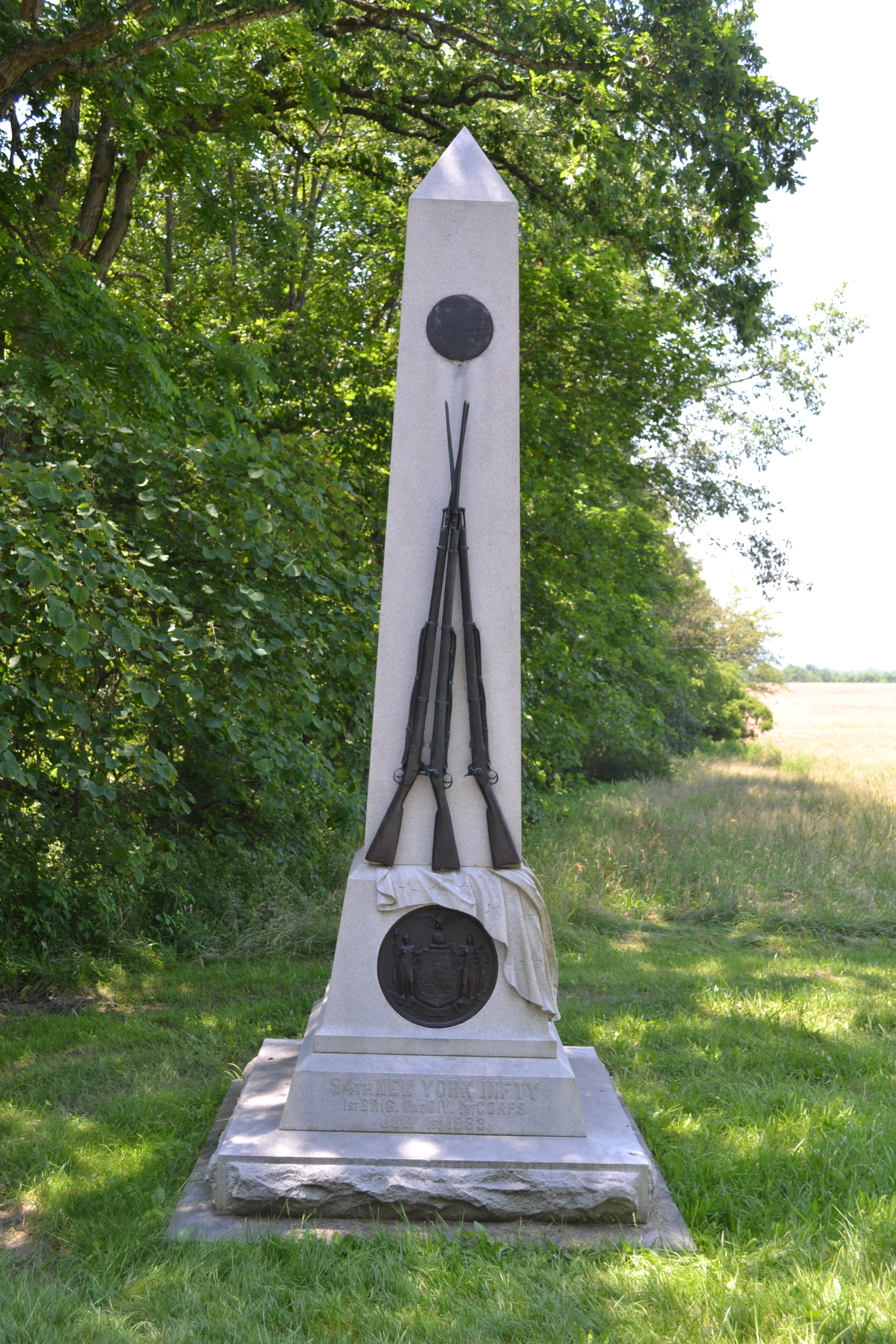
The monument to the 94th New York Volunteer Infantry at Gettysburg National Cemetery

The 94th New York Infantry Regiment ("Bell Rifles" or "Bell Jefferson Rifles") was an infantry regiment in the Union Army during the American Civil War. The regiment has the distinction of being the last volunteer infantry regiment to muster out of the Army of the Potomac.

== Service ==
The 94th New York Infantry was organized at Sacketts Harbor, New York beginning in October 1861 and mustered in for three years service on March 10, 1862 under the command of Colonel Henry K. Viele.

The regiment was attached to Wadsworth's Command, Military District of Washington, D.C., to May 1862. 1st Brigade, 2nd Division, Department of the Rappahannock, to June 1862. 2nd Brigade, 2nd Division, III Corps, Army of Virginia, to September 1862. 2nd Brigade, 2nd Division, I Corps, Army of the Potomac, to December 1862. 1st Brigade, 2nd Division, I Corps, to May 1863. Provost Guard, Army of the Potomac, to June 1863. 1st Brigade, 2nd Division, I Corps, to December 1863. District of Annapolis, Maryland, VIII Corps, Middle Department, to May 1864. 2nd Brigade, 2nd Division, V Corps, Army of the Potomac, to May 30, 1864. 1st Brigade, 2nd Division, V Corps, to June 6, 1864. 1st Brigade, 3rd Division, V Corps, to June 11. 2nd Brigade, 3rd Division, V Corps, to September. 3rd Brigade, 3rd Division, V Corps, to October 1864. 2nd Brigade, 3rd Division, V Corps, to November 1864. 3rd Brigade, 3rd Division, V Corps, to July 1865.

The 94th New York Infantry mustered out of service on July 18, 1865 at Ball's Crossroads, Virginia in present-day Ballston, Virginia.

== Detailed service ==
Left New York for Washington, D.C., March 18, 1862. Duty in the defenses of Washington, D.C., until May 1862. Moved to Fredericksburg, Va., and duty there until May 25. Expedition to Front Royal May 25-June 18. Duty at Manassas, Warrenton, and Culpeper, Va., until August. Battle of Cedar Mountain August 9. Pope's campaign in northern Virginia August 16-September 2. Fords of the Rappahannock August 20–23. Thoroughfare Gap August 28. Battle of Groveton, August 29. Second Battle of Bull Run, August 30. Battle of Chantilly, September 1. Maryland Campaign September 6–22. Battle of South Mountain, September 14. Battle of Antietam, September 16–17. Duty at Sharpsburg, Md., until October 30. Movement to Falmouth, Va., October 30-November 19. Battle of Fredericksburg, Va., December 12–15. At Falmouth and Belle Plains until April 27, 1863. "Mud March" January 20–24. Chancellorsville Campaign April 27-May 6. Operations at Fitzhugh's Crossing April 29-May 2. Battle of Chancellorsville May 2–5. Gettysburg Campaign June 11-July 24. Battle of Gettysburg, July 1–3. Pursuit of Lee to Manassas Gap, Va., July 5–24. Duty on line of the Rappahannock and Rapidan until October. Bristoe Campaign October 9–22. Advance to line of the Rappahannock November 7–8. Mine Run Campaign November 26-December 2. Duty in the District of Annapolis, Md., until May 1864. Rapidan Campaign May 26-June 15. Totopotomoy May 28–31. Cold Harbor June 1–12. Bethesda Church June 1–3. White Oak Swamp June 13. Before Petersburg June 16–18. Siege of Petersburg June 16, 1864 to April 2, 1865. Mine Explosion, Petersburg, July 30, 1864 (reserve). Weldon Railroad August 18–21. Reconnaissance toward Dinwiddie Court House September 15. Warren's Raid on Weldon Railroad December 7–12. Dabney's Mills, Hatcher's Run, February 5–7, 1865. Appomattox Campaign March 28-April 9. Lewis Farm, near Gravelly Run, March 29. White Oak Road March 31. Five Forks April 1. Fall of Petersburg April 2. Pursuit of Lee April 3–9. Appomattox Court House April 9. Surrender of Lee and his army. Moved to Washington, D.C., May 1–12. Grand Review of the Armies May 23. Duty in the defenses of Washington until July.

== Casualties ==
The regiment lost a total of 247 men during service; 5 officers and 105 enlisted men killed or mortally wounded, 137 enlisted men died of disease.

== Commanders ==
- Colonel Henry K. Viele - resigned May 2, 1862
- Colonel Adrian Rowe Root
- Lieutenant Colonel Calvin Littlefield - commanded at the Battle of Antietam
- Major John A. Kress - commanded at the Battle of Fredericksburg
- Major Samuel A. Moffett - commanded at the Battle of Chancellorsville while still at the rank of captain; commanded at the Battle of Gettysburg after Col. Root was wounded and captured on July 1
- Major John McMahon - commanded at the Battle of Globe Tavern
- Major Henry H. Fish - commanded during the Appomattox Campaign until killed in action at the Battle of Five Forks
- Captain Albert T. Morgan - commanded after the death of Maj. Fish

== Notable members ==
- Lieutenant Colonel John A. Kress - one of only six men to receive the Silver Citation Star for the Civil War Campaign Medal

== See also ==
- List of New York Civil War regiments
- New York in the Civil War
