= Admiral Dewey March =

Composition
- Written: 1898
- Genre: March

"Admiral Dewey March" is patriotic war march written in 1898 with numerous composers. The march is dedicated to George Dewey, a U.S. Navy Admiral, and his actions during the Spanish–American War, specifically the Battle of Manila Bay in 1898.

== Historical background ==
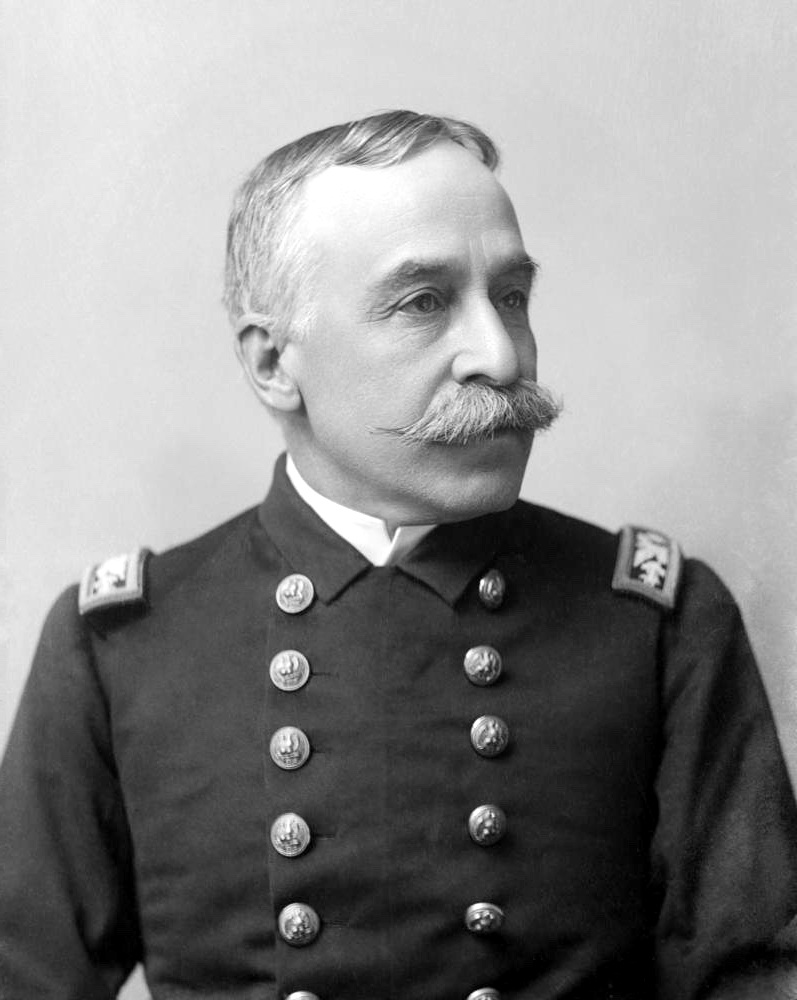
Admiral George Dewey

Dewey was given command of the Asiatic Squadron in 1897 and began preparing his squadron for war. Less than a year later, in April 1898, the Spanish–American War began. The United States, fearing an attack from the Spanish, sent a fleet to the Philippines to destroy a Spanish flotilla in Manila Bay, commanded by Spanish Rear Admiral Patricio Montojo y Pasarón. It was here when Dewey gave his famous order 'You may fire when ready, Gridley', to Captain Charles Vernon Gridley, the Commanding Officer of the flagship USS Olympia (C-6). Dewey and his fleet had a decisive victory, and "Montojo's fleet was destroyed, suffering 371 casualties compared to only 9 Americans wounded."

Following his victory in the Battle of Manila Bay, Dewey returned to the United States a war hero, with many musicians composing marches in his honor.

== Versions ==
=== Helen Frances Phillips ===
Frances wrote her version of the march just four days after the Battle of Manila ended, and it was published on July 28, 1898, by the Syracuse Post. Frances' composition is in the form of a march and two-step.

=== Marie Marguerite Points ===
Points' version of the march is called "Admiral Dewey's Grand March" and primarily features the piano. It was published by the Louis Grunewald Company on May 18, 1898.

=== Herman Bellstedt ===
The cover page on Herman Bellstedt's version of the Admiral Dewey March says "Respectfully dedicated to Admiral George Dewey, U.S.N." Bellstedt composed this piece in 1898 following the Battle of Manila Bay and played it with his famous Bellstedt band. He was also a "renowned cornet virtuoso". A copy can also be found in the Al Rose Collection, in Jones Hall at Tulane University.

=== Otto Bonnell ===
Published on June 7, 1898, in Chicago, IL, Otto Bonnell's version of Admiral Dewey's March is primarily composed in piano. Bonnell's rendition of the march "was later introduced into the 1899 Broadway play, By the Sad Sea Waves, making it clear that the American public viewed Admiral Dewey as a hero during this time.

=== Samuel Lapin ===
Samuel Lapin composed his version of the Admiral Dewey March in a two-step and piano form. The cover page of Lapin's work, which was published on June 10th, 1898 by the Shonemen Brothers, is entitled "Respectfully Dedicated to the Heroes of the Asiatic Squadron".

=== William H. Santelmann ===
William H. Santelmann, a German-born musician, was the 19th Director of the United States Marine Band. He composed the Admiral Dewey March in 1898, and subsequently led the Marine Corps Band in orchestrating the piece. Additionally, "a ten-CD 'Bicentennial Collection' of the music of the U.S. Marine Band, which included the Berliner issue of the Santelmann, Admiral Dewey March, is available commercially".

=== Alva Van Riper ===
Riper also composed his march in 1898. There is currently a "copy of the sheet music in the David Soren Popular Sheet Music Collection, Box 1, Folder 1, Special Collections University of Arizona Libraries".

=== Other composers ===
Other composers of Admiral Dewey's March include: A.M. Hall, Paul Marcel, James C. Beckel, Harry C. Smith, E.C. Cary, Al Caradies, Frederick S. Hall, Paul Marcel, Addie Hornbach, Rita E.C. Weigand, Arthur de Collard, and A. G. Maier
