= Evan Harris Humphrey =

United States Army general (1875–1963)

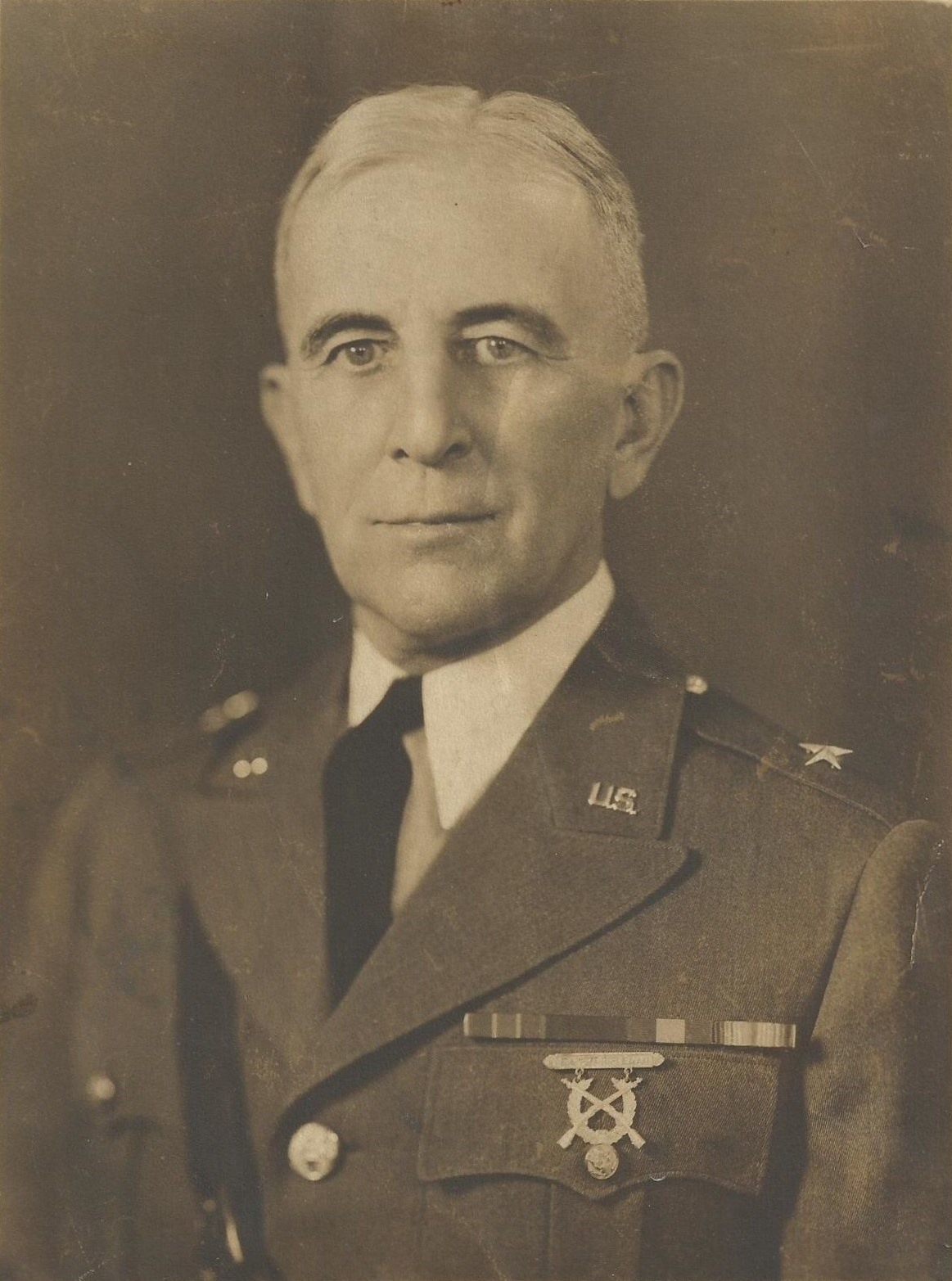
- Born: March 5, 1875; San Francisco, California, U.S.
- Died: August 30, 1963 (aged 88); San Antonio, Texas, U.S.
- Burial place: Arlington National Cemetery
- Education: United States Military Academy
- Relatives: Charles F. Humphrey (father); Charles F. Humphrey Jr. (brother)
- Military career
- Allegiance: United States
- Branch: United States Army
- Service years: 1899–1939
- Rank: Brigadier General
- Commands: 23rd Infantry Brigade; 1st Cavalry Brigade; 6th Cavalry Regiment; Battalion, Philippine Scouts; Troop, 7th Cavalry Regiment
- Conflicts: First World War

Evan Harris Humphrey (March 5, 1875 – August 30, 1963) was a brigadier general in the United States Army.

== Biography ==
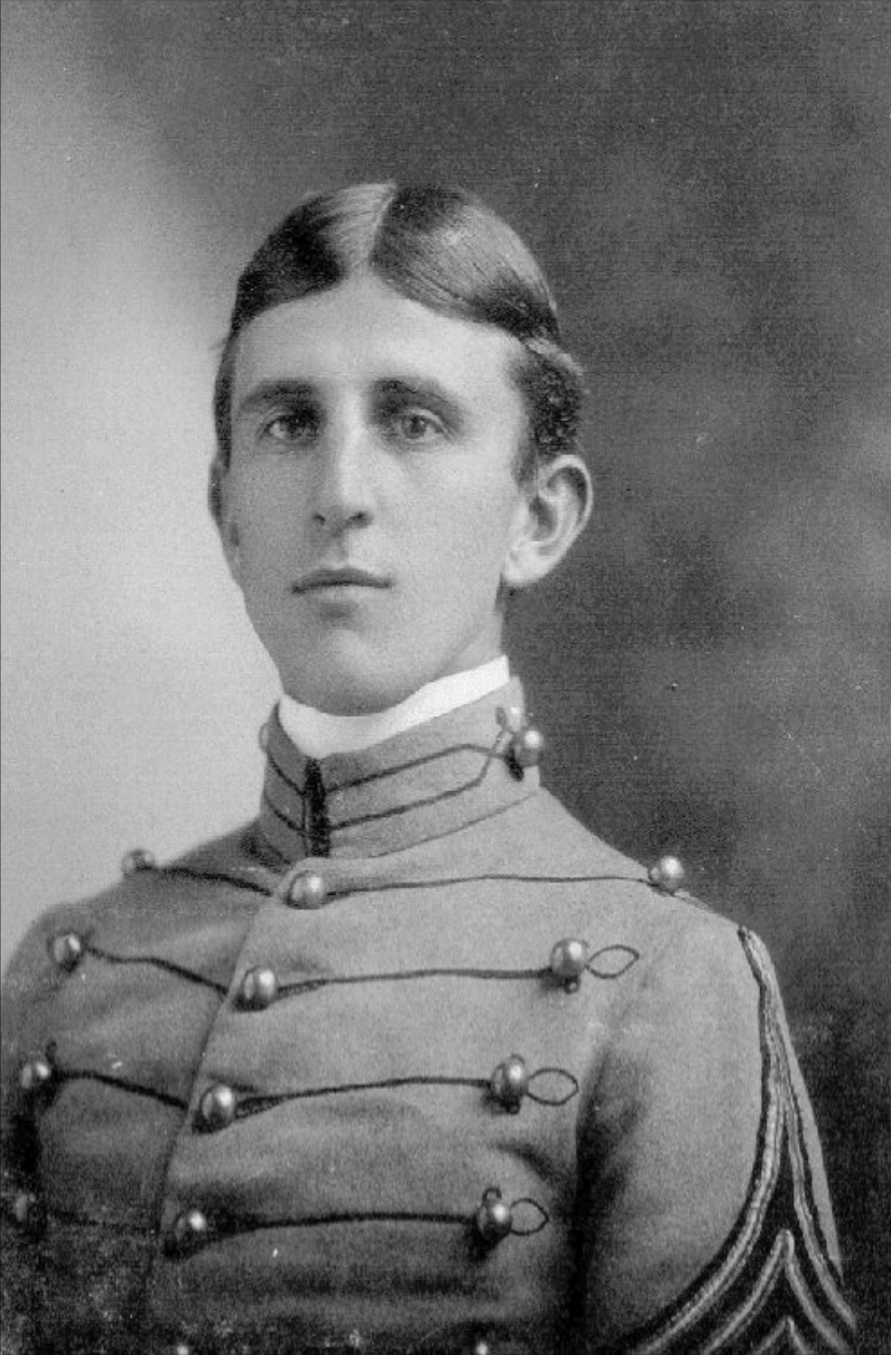
At West Point in 1899

Humphrey was born in Black Point, San Francisco, California on March 5, 1875. His father was major general and Medal of Honor recipient Charles Frederic Humphrey Sr., his brothers were Brigadier General Charles F. Humphrey and Marine Corps Colonel Marion Bell Humphrey. Humphrey married Clara Swift, daughter of Major General Eben Swift and sister of Major General Innis P. Swift.

He died in San Antonio, Texas on August 30, 1963. Humphrey, along with Clara (1891–1942), are buried at Arlington National Cemetery.

== Career ==
Humphrey graduated from the United States Military Academy in 1899 as a cavalry officer and was stationed in Cuba. From 1905 to 1906, he served in the Philippines. From 1910 to 1912, Humphrey was a troop commander in the 7th Cavalry. From 1912 to 1916, he was battalion commander in the Philippine Scouts.

During World War I, Humphrey served with the 346th Infantry, 87th Division at Camp Pike, Arkansas and Camp Dix, New Jersey. From August 1918 to February 1919, he was chief of staff of the 10th Division at Camp Funston, Kansas.

From September 1920 to July 1924, Humphrey served at Fort Leavenworth, Kansas. From 1920 to 1921, he was student at the School of the Line. From 1921 to 1922, Humphrey studied at the General Staff School. From 1922 to 1924, he was a cavalry instructor and then chief of the Cavalry Section. From August 1924 to June 1925, Humphrey was a student at the United States Army War College at Washington Barracks, now Fort Lesley J. McNair.

From 1925 to 1929, he was an instructor at the Army War College before being named to command Fort Oglethorpe, Georgia and the 6th Cavalry Regiment until 1931. At Fort Bliss, he was executive officer and chief of staff for the 1st Cavalry Division. In 1933, he returned to the Army War College as assistant commandant of the college and promoted to brigadier general in February 1935. In June, became commanding general of the 1st Cavalry Brigade and post commander at Fort Clark, Texas.

In 1936, he was assigned to the Philippines as commanding general of the 23rd Brigade at Fort William McKinley, then commanding general at Fort Stotsenburg to April 1938. His final posting in 1938 was commanding general of the New York Port of Embarkation at the Brooklyn Army Terminal in Brooklyn, New York until his mandatory retirement on March 31, 1939. Humphrey also pulled a temporary stint as commanding general, Second Corps Area at Fort Jay, Governors Island, New York from July 30 to November 5, 1938, between the assignments of Major General Frank Ross McCoy and Major General Hugh Aloysius Drum.
