= Civil War Campaign Medal =

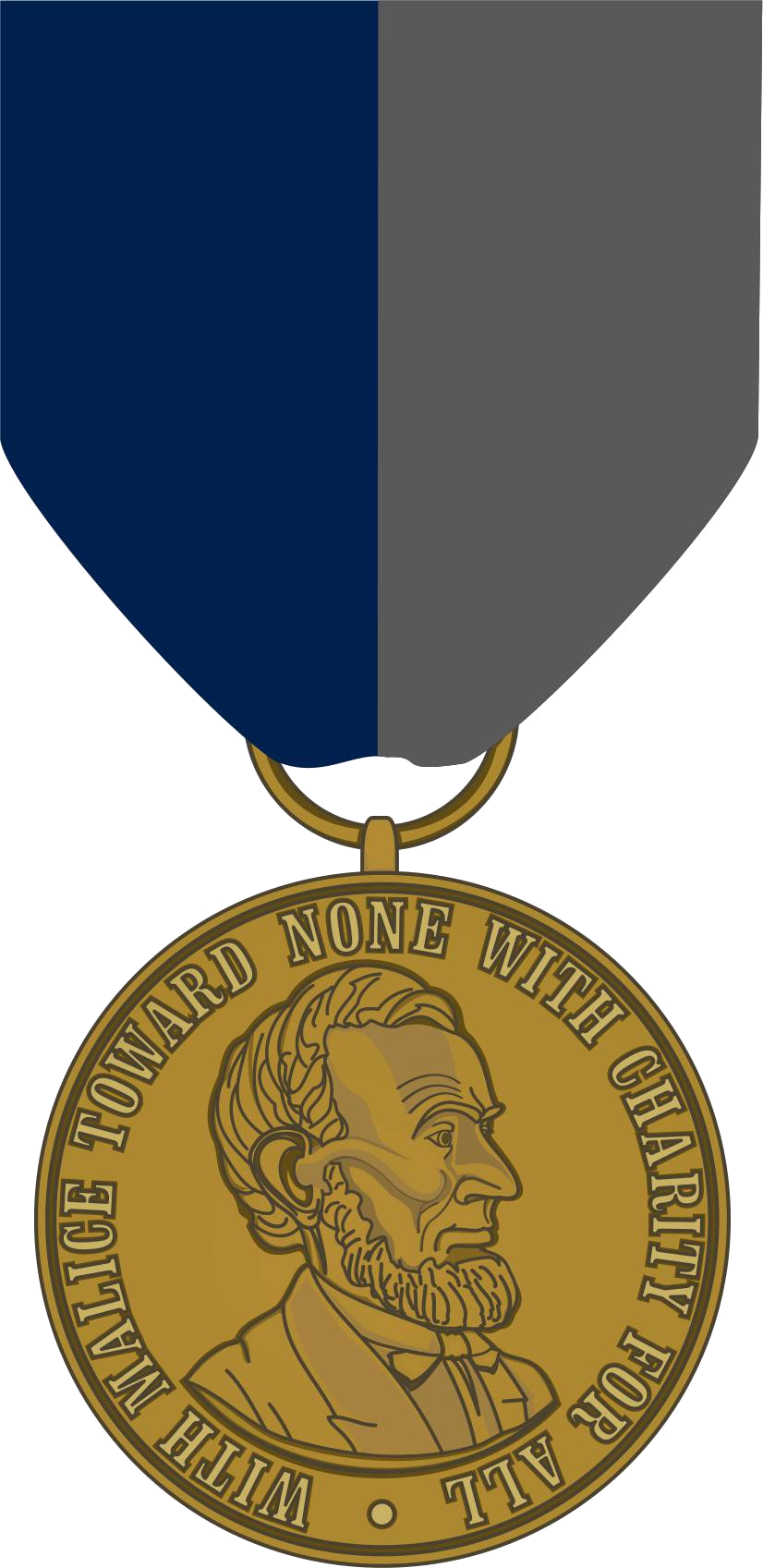
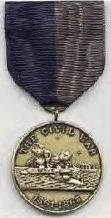
- Army & Navy Civil War Campaign Medals
- Type: Campaign medal
- Presented by: the Department of War and Department of the Navy
- Eligibility: Service in the American Civil War between 1861 and 1865
- Status: Obsolete
- Established: 1905; 121 years ago
- First award: 1905 (retroactive to April 15, 1861)
- Ribbon campaign streamer

The Civil War Campaign Medal is considered the first campaign service medal of the United States Armed Forces. The decoration was awarded to members of the United States Armed Forces who had served in the American Civil War between 1861 and 1865.

== Establishment ==
The medal was first authorized in 1905 for the fortieth anniversary of the Civil War's conclusion. The blue and gray ribbon denotes the respective uniform colors of the U.S. and Confederate troops. The Army Civil War Campaign Medal was established by the United States War Department on January 21, 1907, by General Orders Number 12. To qualify, a soldier had to serve between April 15, 1861, and April 9, 1865. The closing date was extended to August 20, 1866, date of President Johnson's Proclamation ending the war. The corresponding Navy Civil War Medal was established on June 27, 1908, by Navy Department.

The obverse of the Army Civil War Campaign Medal displayed an engraved image of Abraham Lincoln while the Navy and Marine Corps versions depicted the USS Monitor and CSS Virginia's battle at Hampton Roads. The reverse has the words "The Civil War 1861-1865" encircled by a wreath. The medal was designed by Francis D. Millet, a noted sculptor who perished on the RMS Titanic in 1912. The medal was struck at the Philadelphia Mint. Civil War Campaign Medal No. 1 was issued to Maj. Gen. Charles F. Humphrey on May 26, 1909.

The medal was originally established as a badge, because Congress would not approve a medal due to the costs involved. The War Department was authorized to create badges, so it did. This interest was due in large part to the fact that several senior military officers were veterans of the Civil War. Although some recipients may have worn some form of the ribbon, the monies necessary to mint and issue the medal were not appropriated by Congress until 1956 – 91 years after the war ended, and a week after the death of Albert Woolson, the last surviving verified veteran of the war. It was this act that provided U.S. government purchase for the medal to all qualified veterans, whether they were on active or inactive duty.

In 1918, for those who had been cited for gallantry in action, the Silver Citation Star was authorized as a device to the medal. Only six Citation Stars were awarded, with the six being awarded to Charles G. Conn of the 1st Michigan Sharpshooters Regiment, George F. Goldthwait of the 31st Maine Infantry Regiment, William T. Harris of the 179th New York Infantry Regiment, John A. Kress of the 94th New York Infantry Regiment, Alan M. Wheeler of the 21st New York Infantry Regiment, and William Willi of the 2nd Missouri Infantry Regiment (Union).

Units in the U.S. Army that trace their heritage and lineage to the Civil War are entitled to display a battle streamer for the Civil War on their flagpoles. This streamer is half blue and half gray, the color theme of the second ribbon design. The campaign lettering requires two distinct sets of streamers for each campaign, one set for each side.

Obsolete streamer for Army National Guard units that traced their lineage to the Confederate Army

Army National Guard units that previously traced their lineage to the Confederate Army were stripped of their Civil War battle streamers in 2023. The descendant units remain in service, but the Army National Guard no longer recognizes the lineage nor authorizes the streamers for campaigns against the U.S. Armed Forces.

== Regulations ==
Army Regulation (AR) 600-8-22, Chapter V, Section III, paragraph 5–20 states the following -

Civil War Campaign Medal This medal was established by War Department General Order 12, 1907. It is awarded for service between 15 April 1861 and 9 April 1865, or in Texas between 15 April 1861 and 20 August 1866.

Navy and Marine Corps Awards Manual (Rev. 1953), Part IV, Section 2, Paragraph 1 states the following -

Civil War Campaign Medal This medal is issued to officers and enlisted personnel of the Navy and Marine Corps who served in the naval service during the Civil War, between 15 April 1861 and 9 April 1865. (Special Orders No. 81 and 82 of 27 June 1908.)
