= Charles Frederic Humphrey Sr. =

US Army general and Medal of Honor recipient (1844–1926)

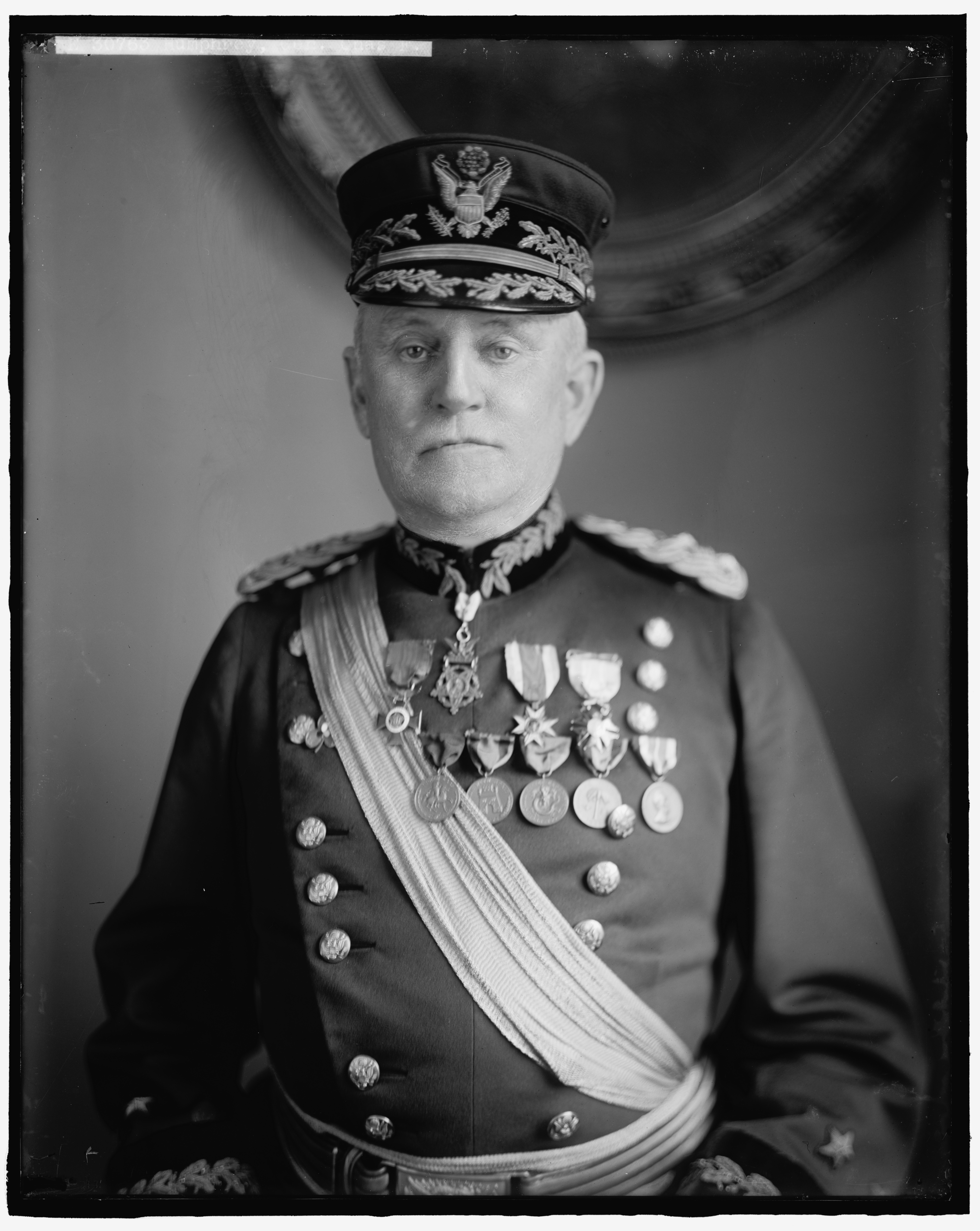
- Born: September 2, 1844; Tioga County, New York, US
- Died: June 4, 1926 (aged 81)
- Burial place: Arlington National Cemetery
- Relatives: Charles F. Humphrey Jr. (son); Evan H. Humphrey (son); Marion Bell Humphrey (son)
- Military career
- Allegiance: United States of America
- Branch: United States Army
- Service years: 1863–1907
- Rank: Major General
- Conflicts: American Civil War; Indian Wars; China Relief Expedition
- Awards: Medal of Honor; Distinguished Service Cross

Charles Frederic Humphrey Sr. (September 2, 1844 – June 4, 1926) was a major general in the United States Army and a Medal of Honor recipient.

== Biography ==
Humphrey was born on September 2, 1844, in Tioga County, New York. He married Juanita Foster DaCosta and had five children. Two of their sons, Evan and Charles Jr., would become brigadier generals. Humphrey died on June 4, 1926, and is buried with Juanita, as well as Evan and another son, Marion, at Arlington National Cemetery.

== Career ==
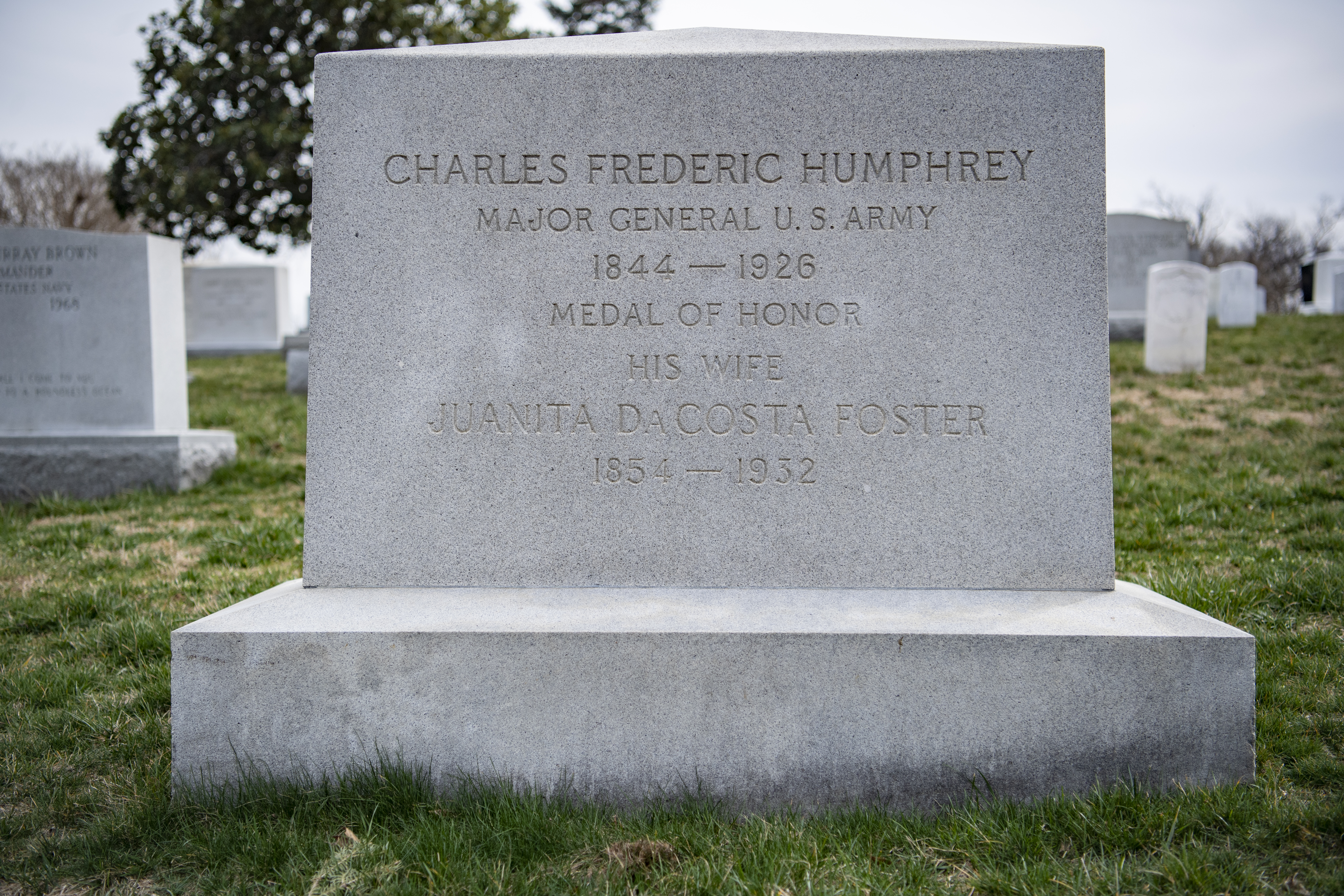
Grave at Arlington National Cemetery

Humphrey originally joined the Union Army during the American Civil War as a private in Company E of the Fifth Artillery Regiment of the Regular Army on 17 March 1863. He was promoted to first sergeant by the time he was commissioned as a 2nd lieutenant in the same regiment on 28 August 1866. He was promoted to first lieutenant on 21 May 1868 and captain and acting quartermaster on 23 June 1879.

He was awarded the Medal of Honor for his actions during the American Indian Wars while he was a first lieutenant.

His award citation reads:

Voluntarily and successfully conducted, in the face of a withering fire, a party which recovered possession of an abandoned howitzer and two Gatling guns lying between the lines a few yards from the Indians.

He rose through the ranks in the Quartermaster Corps and served as a brigadier general of volunteers from September 1898 to June 1899.

Later in his career he served in the China Relief Expedition and then succeeded Marshall I. Ludington as Quartermaster General of the Army with the rank of brigadier general on 21 April 1903. His retirement was effective as of July 1, 1907.

General Humphrey was a companion of the District of Columbia Commandery of the Military Order of the Loyal Legion of the United States.

== Awards ==
- Medal of Honor
- Distinguished Service Cross
- Civil War Campaign Medal
- Indian Campaign Medal
- Spanish Campaign Medal
- China Campaign Medal
- Philippine Campaign Medal

== See also ==
- List of Medal of Honor recipients for the Indian Wars
