= Charles F. Humphrey Jr. =

United States Army general (1876–1968)

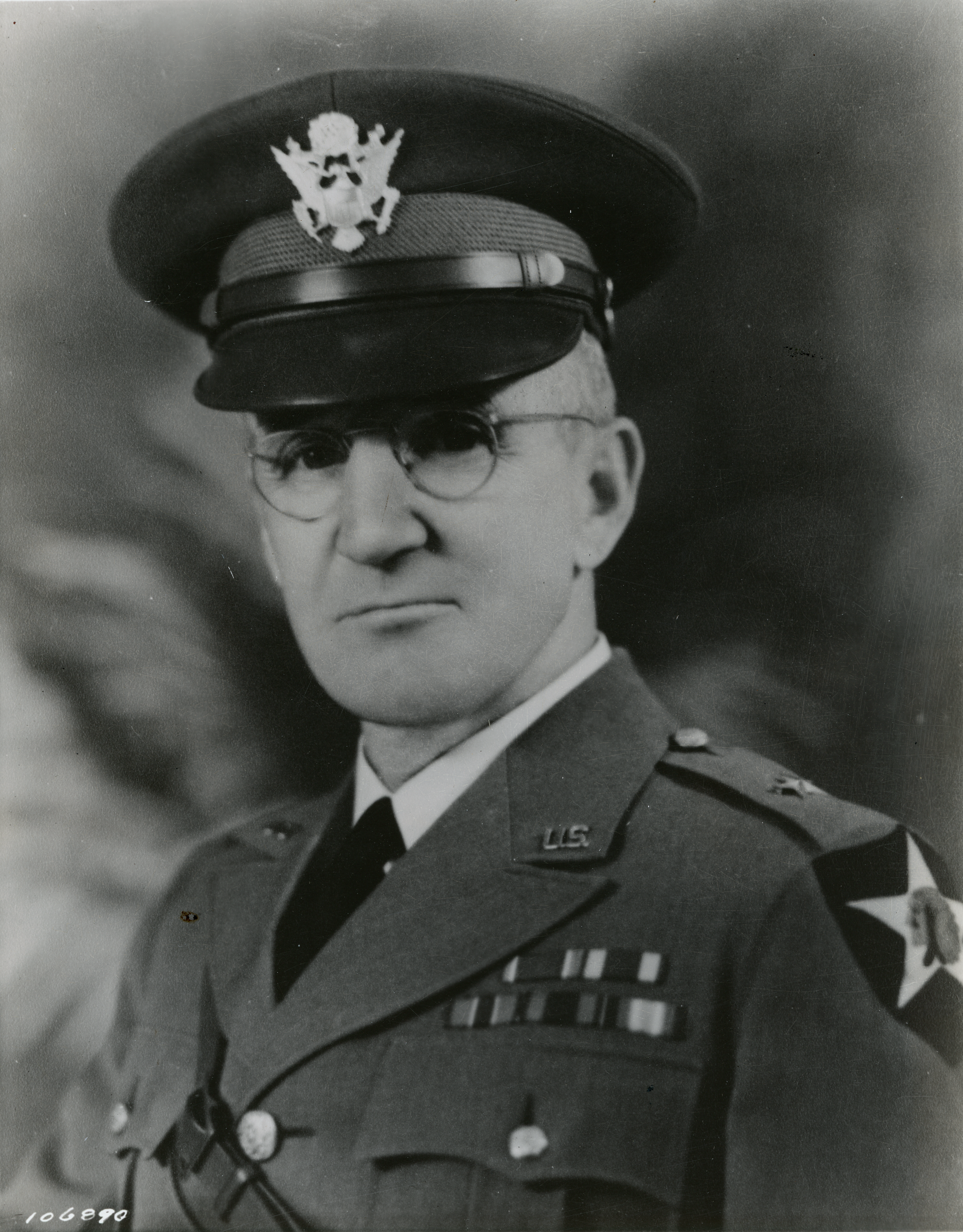
- Humphrey as a brigadier general in 1938
- Born: 11 August 1876; Washington, D.C., U.S.
- Died: 22 January 1968 (aged 91); Fort Benning, Georgia, U.S.
- Burial place: Arlington National Cemetery
- Spouse: Helen Kingsbury (m. 1903–1949)
- Children: 1
- Relatives: Charles Frederic Humphrey Sr. (father); Evan Harris Humphrey (brother)
- Military career
- Service: United States Army
- Service years: 1898–1940
- Rank: Brigadier General
- Service number: O668
- Unit: US Army Infantry Branch
- Commands: 18th Infantry Regiment; Fort Hamilton; Overseas Discharge and Replacement Service, Fort McDowell; 4th Brigade, 2nd Infantry Division; Fort Warren, Wyoming; Eighth Corps Area; 3rd Brigade, 2nd Infantry Division
- Wars: Spanish–American War; Philippine–American War; World War I
- Awards: Distinguished Service Cross

Charles F. Humphrey Jr. (11 August 1876 – 22 January 1968) was a career officer in the United States Army. A veteran of the Spanish–American War, Philippine–American War, and World War I, he served for more than 40 years and attained the rank of brigadier general. As a first lieutenant, he received the Distinguished Service Cross for actions in the Philippine–American War.

A highly regarded trainer and organizer, in the 1930s, Humphrey advocated to senior army and federal government leaders that the United States prepare for entry into the coming world war, including improvements to training and fielding improved equipment. He retired in 1940 and lives first San Antonio, and later in Columbus, Georgia. He died at Fort Benning on 22 January 1968 and was buried at Arlington National Cemetery.

== Early life ==
Charles Frederic Humphrey Jr. (Note: Humphrey's middle name was sometimes spelled "Frederick" but most records including his grave marker indicate that "Frederic" is correct.) was born in Washington, DC on 11 August 1876, a son of Charles Frederic Humphrey Sr. and Juanita DaCosta (Foster) Humphrey. Among his siblings were army officer Evan Harris Humphrey, United States Merchant Marine officer Julian F. Humphrey, United States Marine Corps officers Marion B. Humphrey and Joseph D. Humphrey, and sisters Helen and Juanita. The Humphrey family traveled extensively because of Humphrey Sr.'s military career, and Humphrey Jr. was educated at schools in San Francisco and Cheyenne, Wyoming. He was a graduate of Omaha High School; while a student he participated in the corps of cadets program, in which he attained the rank of sergeant. With the army expanding after the April 1898 start of the Spanish–American War, in June 1898, Humphrey was a resident of Washington, DC when he was one of nearly 200 civilian applicants approved for army commissions.

== Start of career ==
In July 1898, Humphrey was appointed a second lieutenant of Infantry and assigned to the 17th Infantry Regiment. He was promoted to first lieutenant in March 1899 and served with the 12th Infantry Regiment during the Philippine–American War service. In 1919, Humphrey received the Distinguished Service Cross for heroism in the Philippines on 16 August 1899. In October 1899, Humphrey transferred back to the 17th Infantry. An extended illness caused him to return to the United States before his regiment, and after an extended medical leave, he rejoined the 17th Infantry at Columbus Barracks, Ohio.

In March and April 1902, Humphrey was recorder for the Columbus Barracks examining board that considered officers for promotion. In February 1903, he was transferred to the 3rd Infantry Regiment at Boise Barracks, Idaho. Illness required him to remain hospitalized at Washington Barracks during the summer of that year; after convalescing, he rejoined his regiment at Columbus Barracks. Humphrey was promoted to captain in November 1903. In April 1904, he was detailed to quartermaster duty in Brooklyn, New York. He was then posted to Hawaii, where he assisted with development of the quartermaster general's plan to purchase land and construct facilities for US bases in and around Honolulu. He later performed commissary of subsistence duties in Hawaii, and he was relieved from his quartermaster detail in October 1906.

=== Family ===
In September 1903, Humphrey married Helen Kingsbury. They were married until her death in 1949 and were the parents of a daughter, Helen, the wife of Colonel Denis Milton Moore.

== Continued career ==
After returning from Hawaii in early 1907, Humphrey was hospitalized for illness; after returning to duty in May, he was assigned to the 12th Infantry. Humphrey then performed quartermaster duties in Maine, where he oversaw construction of facilities at Forts McKinley, Levett, Preble, Williams, Knox, and Scammel. In June 1910, he was assigned to the office of the army's quartermaster general. Special duties he performed while on the quartermaster general's staff included membership on the panel that evaluated Harry N. Emmert for employment as superintendent of Beverly National Cemetery in New Jersey; Emmert received the appointment. In October 1912, he was the quartermaster general's representative at the dedication of the Culpeper National Cemetery monument erected by the state of Pennsylvania in memory of Pennsylvania soldiers buried there, which he accepted on behalf of the federal government. In December 1912, Humphrey was relieved from his quartermaster detail and rejoined the 12th Infantry. In early 1913, he was assigned to temporary court-martial detail at the Presidio of Monterey, California.

In January 1915, he was transferred to the 24th Infantry Regiment. In July, he was assigned to the 8th Infantry Regiment. He was promoted to major in May 1917. With the army expanding after American entry into World War I in April 1917, he received promotion to temporary lieutenant colonel in August 1917 and colonel in May 1918. His wartime assignments included ordnance officer for the 88th Division at Camp Dodge, Iowa and inspector of quartermaster records and inventories at Camp Dodge. He was subsequently assigned as senior instructor at the Camp Lee, Virginia Infantry Replacement Center.

== Later career ==
After the war, Humphrey was assigned as executive officer and second-in-command of the Castle Williams military prison on Governors Island, New York. He received promotion to permanent lieutenant colonel and permanent colonel, both effective in July 1920. He graduated from the Fort Leavenworth Army School of the Line in 1921. In 1922, he completed the program of instruction at the United States Army Command and General Staff College. Humphrey completed the course at the United States Army War College in 1923. After graduating, he was assigned to the staff of the Fourth Corps Area at Fort McPherson, Georgia as assistant chief of staff for logistics (G-4). In February 1927, he was assigned to command the 18th Infantry Regiment at Fort Slocum, New York. After assuming command, he moved the regimental headquarters to Fort Hamilton, New York, where he commanded the post in addition to the regiment.

In July 1929, Humphrey was assigned to duty in the office of the US Army's G-4. In April 1933, Humphrey was assigned to command the Overseas Discharge and Replacement Service at Fort McDowell, California. In August 1935, he was promoted to brigadier general and assigned to command 4th Brigade, 2nd Infantry Division and the post at Fort Warren, Wyoming. He acted as commander of Eighth Corps Area in the summer of 1936, appointed to the position during extensive command post exercises and war games. In October 1936, President Franklin D. Roosevelt spoke at Fort Warren while campaigning for reelection; Humphrey was his host and a member of the welcoming party. In April 1937, Humphrey was assigned to command 3rd Infantry Brigade, 2nd Infantry Division at Fort Sam Houston. Humphrey was scheduled to retire at the mandatory age of 64 in August 1940; in December 1939 he requested retirement for disability. His request was approved and he left the army in March 1940, five months before his mandatory retirement date.

In retirement, Humphrey resided first in San Antonio and later in Columbus, Georgia. He died at Fort Benning's Martin Army Community Hospital on 22 January 1968. Humphrey was buried at Arlington National Cemetery.

== Distinguished Service Cross citation ==
The President of the United States of America, authorized by Act of Congress, July 9, 1918, takes pleasure in presenting the Distinguished Service Cross to First Lieutenant (Infantry) Charles F. Humphrey, Jr., United States Army, for extraordinary heroism while serving with 12th Infantry, in action against hostile insurgents at Angeles, Luzon, Philippine Islands, 16 August 1899, while serving as first lieutenant, 12th U.S. Infantry. While exposed to heavy enemy fire Lieutenant Humphrey dressed the wounds of three men of his company, and his courage, coolness, and good judgment were an inspiration to his command.

Service: United States Army Rank: First Lieutenant (Infantry) Regiment: 12th Infantry Action Date: 16 August 1899 Orders: War Department General Orders No. 126 (1919)

== Dates of rank ==
- Second Lieutenant, 9 July 1898
- First Lieutenant, 2 March 1899
- Captain, 21 November 1903
- Major, 15 May 1917
- Lieutenant Colonel (National Army), 5 August 1917
- Colonel (National Army), 11 May 1918
- Lieutenant Colonel, 1 July 1920
- Colonel, 1 July 1920
- Brigadier General, 9 August 1935
- Brigadier General (Retired), 1 March 1940
