= National Life Group =

American life insurance and annuities company

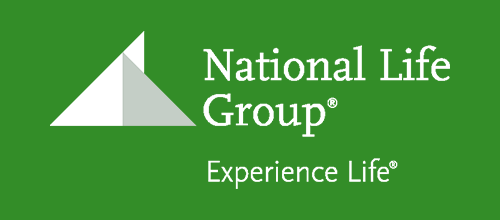
- Industry: Insurance: life and annuity
- Founded: November 13, 1848; 178 years ago
- Headquarters: Montpelier, Vermont, United States
- Key people: Mehran Assadi (Chairman, CEO, and President)
- Net income: $574 million (2024)
- Total assets: $55.2 billion (2024)
- Number of employees: 1,600 (2025)
- Website: nationallife.com

National Life Group is an American mutual life-insurance company with campuses in Montpelier, Vermont and Addison, Texas. It is the trade name of National Life Insurance Company and its affiliates that offer life insurance and annuity products for individuals, families, and businesses.

Affiliates of National Life Group include National Life Insurance Company, Life Insurance Company of the Southwest, and Equity Services, Inc., a broker-dealer and registered investment adviser.

== History ==
National Life Insurance Company was chartered by the Vermont Legislature on November 13, 1848, and was one of the first mutual life insurance companies in the U.S. The company wrote its first policy on the life of Daniel Baldwin, a resident of Montpelier, on January 17, 1850. It also paid its first death claim only a few months after its founding at the death of Rowland Allen, who had bought two policies for face amounts of $500 each. Other past insurance customers have included passengers on the Titanic, as well as victims of the 1918 influenza epidemic.

In 1919, Ellen Putnam became one of the company’s earliest female agents and was still submitting applications shortly before her death at age 95.

National Life Group introduced the idea of living benefits when advertisements were placed in the Saturday Evening Post and Time Magazine in June 1937 informing readers of the potential cash value of life insurance as a retirement salary or emergency fund.

The Coleman Mutual Aid Association was established in Coleman, Texas, in 1923 and became Life Insurance of the Southwest (LSW) in 1962. LSW was acquired by National Life Insurance Company in 1996. In 1968, the company’s broker-dealer, Equity Services, Inc. (ESI), was formed. National Life Investment Management Co. purchased US LIFE Mutual Funds Management Corp., which became Sentinel Advisors in 1976 and NLG Capital in 2018.

National Life offers a range of financial services including life insurance and annuities with a customer base of more than 1.5 million as of 2025. Total Life Weighted New Annualized Premiums marked $634M in December 2025 with the company managing a total of $66B in assets.

The company is based in Montpelier, Vermont, with additional offices in Several member companies make up National Life Group, including National Life Insurance Company, Life Insurance Company of the Southwest, and Equity Services, Inc., a broker-dealer and registered investment adviser.

In 2016, authors Jackie and Kevin Freiberg, who wrote NUTS! Southwest Airlines’ Crazy Recipe for Business and Personal Success, featured the servant-leadership culture of National Life Group with CEO Mehran Assadi on the cover of their book, CAUSE!.

In 2025, National Life Group was recognized by the Wall Street Journal as a “Best Whole Life Insurance Company,” was No. 1 in IUL market share, was third in IUL Sales, and was tenth in individual life insurance sales.

In 2018, The CEO Forum recognized National Life Group as one of “America’s Magnificent Eight Exceptional Companies.” In that same year, the company also made the Fortune 1000 list. In 2019, the company expanded its strategic partnership with NTT DATA to accelerate digital transformation. In 2019, It also expanded its partnership with Cognizant, an IT consulting corporation.

From 2008 to 2019, the company saw a 252% growth in life insurance sales. The national average was only about 6%.

In March 2020, the company's CEO, Mehran Assadi, was awarded the Transformative CEO Award for Customer Experience in the insurance category by The CEO Forum. In 2021, the company was ranked #1 in indexed life sales. Nimesh Mehta was named ORBIE CIO of the year. In 2022, National Life Group was named to the Inc. Best in Business list in the insurance category and under the Area of Impact: Black Entrepreneurship. National Life created BUILD (Blacks Uplifted in Leadership) to address the shortage of people of color in leadership positions.

During the coronavirus pandemic, the company made the decision to cover at-home antigen tests before a federal ruling required it of all self-insured and private health insurance companies.

== Programs ==
=== Do Good Fest ===
Do Good Fest is National Life Group’s benefit concert series. These annual concerts raise funds for the youth mental health and help end childhood hunger through the National Peace of Mind Fund. The Fest includes performances by national and local bands, food vendors, and a Nonprofit Village with booths hosted by local nonprofits. In 2022, the concert was expanded to include Beats for Good, a high school music competition.

=== Share the Good ===
National Life’s Share the Good program matches employee charitable donations. In 2019, $500,000 was raised, and by 2022, donations surpassed $700,000 for over 435 organizations. In the 2023 annual campaign, employees, directors, and retirees contributed $408,947 to more than 525 organizations worldwide.

==== Do Good Heroes Program ====
Originating in 2023, Do Good Heroes is a program that encourages National Life Group agents to recognize fire-rescue-EMS and police departments and personnel for community service activities.

=== LifeChanger of the Year ===
Since 2011, LifeChanger annually recognizes the K-12 educators and school district employees across the United States who make a difference in the lives of students by “exemplifying excellence, positive influence, and leadership”. LifeChanger awards educators and their schools with cash prizes with the grand prize winner receiving $20,000. More than 8,600 educators across more than 2,300 school districts have been nominated over the past 15 years. The program’s initiatives include back-to-school grants that assist 10 educators with supply needs.

== Corporate Responsibility ==
Founded in 2006, the National Life Group Foundation, the company's charitable foundation, sponsors various charitable events and programs focused on ending childhood hunger and supporting youth mental health. The Foundation helps sponsor the LifeChanger of the Year Award. In 2019 The Foundation funded the report, “Evidence-Based Strategies to End Childhood Food Insecurity and Hunger in Vermont”. In 2023, the budget for the Foundation was $2.3 million. In 2025, National Life Group donated $25,000 to the Los Angeles Fire Department Foundation in support of first responders and $25,000 to the Los Angeles-based Dream Center Foundation in support of wildfire recovery efforts.
