= General Gamble =

General Gamble may refer to:

- Duane Gamble (fl. 1980s–2020s), U.S. Army lieutenant general
- Jack K. Gamble (1922–2011), U.S. Air Force major general
- Patrick K. Gamble (born 1945), U.S. Air Force four-star general
- William Gamble (general) (1818–1866), Union Army brigadier general
