= Heidi J. Hoyle =

U.S. Army general

Lieutenant General Heidi J. Hoyle
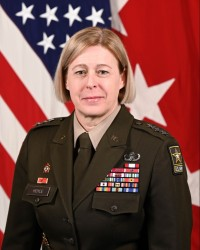
- Official portrait, 2025
- Born: Heidi Jo Hoyle
- Military career
- Allegiance: United States
- Branch: United States Army
- Service years: 1994–present
- Rank: Lieutenant General
- Commands: Military Surface Deployment and Distribution Command; Chief of Ordnance; Joint Munitions Command and Joint Munitions and Lethality Life Cycle Management Command; 71st Explosive Ordnance Disposal Group
- Conflicts: War in Afghanistan; Iraq War
- Awards: Army Distinguished Service Medal; Legion of Merit (3); Bronze Star Medal (2)

Heidi Jo Hoyle-Cleotelis is a lieutenant general in the United States Army who has served as the deputy chief of staff for logistics of the United States Army since 2023. She was the 22nd commanding general of the Military Surface Deployment and Distribution Command, serving from 23 June 2020 to 20 July 2022. She previously served as the 41st chief of ordnance and commandant of the United States Army Ordnance School.

== Military education ==
Hoyle is a native of Bay City, Michigan, and competitive swimmer who graduated from Bay City Central High School in 1990. She was commissioned as an ordnance officer following her graduation from the United States Military Academy at West Point, New York, in 1994. She holds a Bachelor of Science in engineering management, a Master of Science in systems engineering, and a Master of Science in national security and resource strategy.

== Military career ==
Branch detailed to the Chemical Corps, Hoyle attended the Basic Course at Fort McClellan, Alabama, and then moved to Hanau, Germany, for her first assignment as the battalion chemical officer in 7–227th Aviation Regiment. After a quick transition course at Redstone Arsenal, Alabama, she served as accountable officer, then shop officer, in the 71st Ordnance Company before serving as the maintenance support operations officer of the 18th Corps Support Battalion. Following the Combined Logistics Officer Advanced Course and Explosive Ordnance Disposal (EOD) School, she commanded the 761st Ordnance Company (EOD) and also served as the battalion operations officer (S-3) of the 19th Maintenance Battalion at Fort Sill, Oklahoma.

Upon graduation from the University of Virginia in 2004, she was assigned as an instructor, then associate professor, in the Department of Systems Engineering at West Point, New York. Her next assignment was at Fort Carson, Colorado, where she served as the 242nd Ordnance Battalion (EOD) executive officer with deployment to Afghanistan in support of Operation Enduring Freedom. She was then assigned to serve as the aide-de-camp to the director of the Joint Improvised Explosive Device (IED) Defeat Organization. In 2010, she was selected for command of the Special Troops Battalion (STB) of the 3rd Sustainment Brigade, Fort Stewart, Georgia and deployed in support of the Iraq War.

In 2013, Hoyle attended Senior Service College at the Dwight D. Eisenhower School for National Security and Resource Strategy at Fort McNair, Washington, D.C. She then served as deputy chief of staff for prevention programs in 4th ID prior to commanding the 71st EOD Group at Fort Carson, Colorado. Following her command of the 71st EOD Group, she was assigned as the executive officer to the Executive Deputy of Army Materiel Command at Redstone Arsenal, Alabama. Later, she served as commanding general, Joint Munitions Command and Joint Munitions and Lethality Life Cycle Management Command, Rock Island Arsenal, Illinois. She served as the 41st Chief of Ordnance from 2018 to 2020.

In February 2022, Hoyle was reassigned as the director of operations (G-43/5/7) of the Office of the Deputy Chief of Staff for Logistics.

In 2023, Hoyle was promoted to lieutenant general and became the Deputy Chief of Staff, G-4 for the United States Army.

LTG Heidi Hoyle retired from the United States Army on 21 November 2025 after 31 years of service.

== Awards and decorations ==
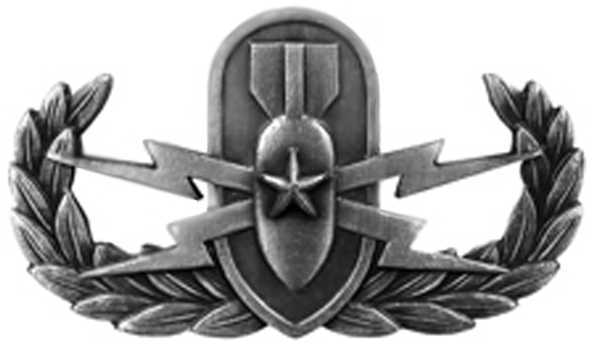
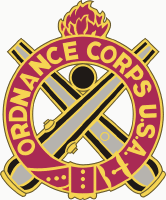
Senior Explosive Ordnance Disposal Badge
82nd Airborne Division CSIB
Army Ordnance Corps Distinctive Unit Insignia
4 Overseas Service Bars

Distinguished Service Medal with bronze oak leaf clusters
Legion of Merit with two bronze oak leaf clusters
Bronze Star Medal with oak leaf cluster
Defense Meritorious Service Medal
Meritorious Service Medal with three oak leaf clusters
Joint Service Commendation Medal
Army Commendation Medal with three oak leaf clusters
Army Achievement Medal with oak leaf cluster
Army Meritorious Unit Commendation with oak leaf cluster
National Defense Service Medal with one bronze service star
Afghanistan Campaign Medal with service star
Iraq Campaign Medal with two service stars
Global War on Terrorism Service Medal
Army Service Ribbon
Army Overseas Service Ribbon with bronze award numeral 3
NATO Medal for service with ISAF

== Personal ==
Hoyle is the daughter of Michael and Edie Hoyle. She is married to Demetrious Cleotelis.

Military offices
Preceded by David Wilson	Chief of Ordnance of the United States Army; 2018–2020	Succeeded by Michelle M.T. Letcher
Preceded by Stephen E. Farmen	Commanding General of the Military Surface Deployment and Distribution Command; 2020–2022	Succeeded by Gavin A. Lawrence
Preceded by Charles R. Hamilton	Director of Operations of the Office of the Deputy Chief of Staff for Logistics of the United States Army; 2022–2023	Succeeded by James M. Smith
Preceded by John E. Hall; Acting	Deputy Chief of Staff for Logistics of the United States Army; 2023–present	Incumbent
