= Christopher Mohan =

U.S. Army general

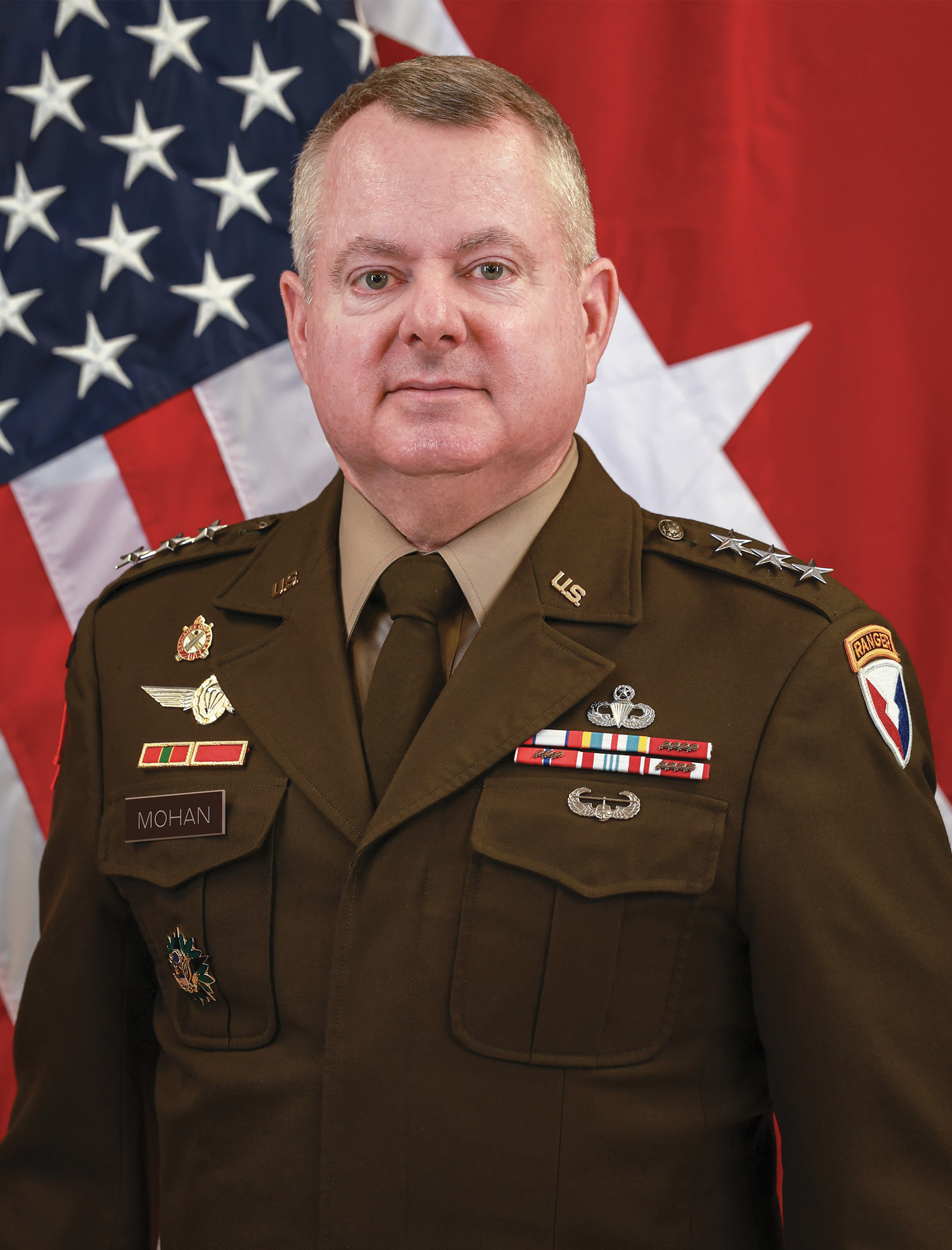
- Official portrait, 2025
- Military career
- Allegiance: United States
- Branch: United States Army
- Service years: 1989–present
- Rank: Lieutenant General
- Commands: United States Army Materiel Command; United States Army Sustainment Command; 21st Theater Sustainment Command; 3rd Sustainment Command (Expeditionary)
- Awards: Army Distinguished Service Medal; Defense Superior Service Medal; Legion of Merit (3)

Christopher O. Mohan is a United States Army lieutenant general who has served as the commanding general of the United States Army Materiel Command since 21 November 2025. He previously served as acting commanding general of the United States Army Materiel Command from 22 March 2024 to 20 November 2025. Prior to that also he served as Army Materiel Command's deputy commanding general from 2 December 2022 to 21 March 2024. He has also served as the commanding general of the United States Army Sustainment Command, 21st Theater Sustainment Command, and 3rd Sustainment Command (Expeditionary).

== Military career ==
In November 2022, Mohan was nominated for promotion to lieutenant general.

Military offices
Preceded by Christopher Sharpsten	Commanding General of the 3rd Sustainment Command (Expeditionary); 2017–2018	Succeeded by James M. Smith
Preceded by Rodney D. Fogg	Deputy Chief of Staff for Logistics and Operations of the United States Army Materiel Command; 2018–2019	Succeeded by Flem Walker
Preceded by Steven A. Shapiro	Commanding General of the 21st Theater Sustainment Command; 2019–2021	Succeeded by James M. Smith
Preceded by Matthew L. Sannito; Acting	Commanding General of the United States Army Sustainment Command; 2021–2022	Succeeded by David Wilson
Preceded by Flem Walker	Deputy Commanding General of the United States Army Materiel Command; 2022–present	Incumbent
Preceded by Charles R. Hamilton	Commanding General of the United States Army Materiel Command; Acting; 2024–present	Incumbent
