= Kurt J. Ryan =

United States Army general

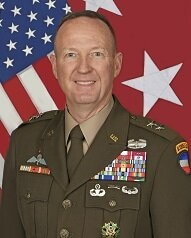
- Military career
- Allegiance: United States of America
- Branch: United States Army
- Service years: 1987–present
- Rank: Major General
- Commands: 593th Expeditionary Sustainment Command; 39th Chief of Ordnance (2015-2016); Military Surface Deployment and Distribution Command (SDDC)
- Awards: Legion of Merit (2)

Major General Kurt J. Ryan is a retired General Officer from the United States Army and was the 20th Commanding General of the United States Army Surface Deployment and Distribution Command. Previously, he served as the 39th Chief of Ordnance for the U.S. Army Ordnance Corps and Commandant of the United States Army Ordnance School at Fort Lee, Virginia. Major General Ryan served as the Deputy Chief of Staff, G-4 (Logistics) for U.S. Army Forces Command, Fort Bragg, North Carolina from March 2018 to June 2021.

== Military education ==
Ryan received a Bachelor Degree from York College in Pennsylvania and was commissioned as a Second Lieutenant in the Ordnance Corps in 1987. He is a graduate of the Combined Logistics Officer Advanced Course, the Logistics Executive Development Course, the Command and General Staff College, and the United States Army War College.

== Military career ==
MG Ryan has participated in numerous operations in defense of freedom and liberty. Most notably, he deployed to the first Gulf War in Kuwait and Iraq (1990-1991); served in Germany (1992-1996); participated in peace enforcement operations in Bosnia and Croatia (1996); participated in the campaign to liberate Iraq (2003); assisted in the rescue, relief, and recovery of American citizens in New Orleans following Hurricane Katrina and Hurricane Rita (2005); served in Afghanistan with a Combined Joint Task Force 82 (CJTF-82) and NATO International Security and Assistance Force (ISAF) (2007-2008), and returned for a short deployment to Afghanistan and Kuwait with the 1st Sustainment Command (TSC), Theater and the 143rd Sustainment Command (Expeditionary) (2009). His last service in Afghanistan (2011–12) was as Commander, 10th Sustainment Brigade, headquartered in Bagram. He subsequently served the Assistant Secretary of Defense for Logistics and Material Readiness in the Office of the Secretary of Defense (2012–13). He was also the Commanding General for the 593rd Expeditionary Sustainment Command (2013–15). He served as the 39th Chief of Ordnance and the United States Army Ordnance School Commandant at Fort Lee, Virginia (2015–16).

On June 16, 2016, Major General Kurt J. Ryan became the 20th commanding general of the United States Army's Military Surface Deployment and Distribution Command.

MG Ryan spent the majority of his career in tactical formations, twice serving as a Paratrooper in the 82nd Airborne Division, two tours with the 101st Airborne Division (Air Assault), a tour in Germany with the 1st Armored Division, and duty in with the 10th Mountain Division, (Light Infantry). He commanded on five occasions; as a company commander in the 1st Armored Division, as a battalion commander in the 82nd Airborne Division, as a Sustainment Brigade Commander in support of the 10th Mountain Division (Light Infantry), as the Commander of the 593rd Sustainment Command (Expeditionary), and as the 39th Chief of Ordnance and Ordnance School Commandant.

== Awards and decorations ==
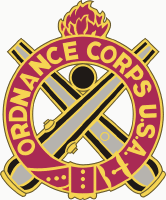
Combat Action Badge
Air Assault Badge
Ranger tab
Master Parachutist Badge
Army Staff Identification Badge
82nd Airborne Division Combat Service Identification Badge
British Parachutist Badge
Army Ordnance Corps Distinctive Unit Insignia
6 Overseas Service Bars

Legion of Merit with one bronze oak leaf cluster
Bronze Star Medal with oak leaf cluster
Defense Meritorious Service Medal with oak leaf cluster
Meritorious Service Medal with silver oak leaf cluster
Army Commendation Medal with four oak leaf clusters
Joint Service Achievement Medal
Army Achievement Medal with two oak leaf clusters
Joint Meritorious Unit Award
Meritorious Unit Commendation with oak leaf cluster
Superior Unit Award
National Defense Service Medal with one bronze service star
Armed Forces Expeditionary Medal
Southwest Asia Service Medal with two service stars
Afghanistan Campaign Medal with two service stars
Iraq Campaign Medal with service star
Global War on Terrorism Service Medal
Armed Forces Service Medal
Humanitarian Service Medal with service star
Army Service Ribbon
Army Overseas Service Ribbon with bronze award numeral 7
NATO Medal for the former Yugoslavia with service star
Kuwait Liberation Medal (Saudi Arabia)
Kuwait Liberation Medal (Kuwait)

Military offices
Preceded by John F. Haley	Chief of Ordnance of the United States Army; 2015 - 2016	Succeeded by David Wilson
Preceded by Susan A. Davidson	Commanding General of the Military Surface Deployment and Distribution Command; 2016–2018	Succeeded by Stephen E. Farmen
Preceded by Ronald Kirklin	Deputy Chief of Staff for Logistics of the United States Army Forces Command; 2018–2021	Succeeded by Gavin A. Lawrence
