= Charles R. Hamilton =

U.S. Army general

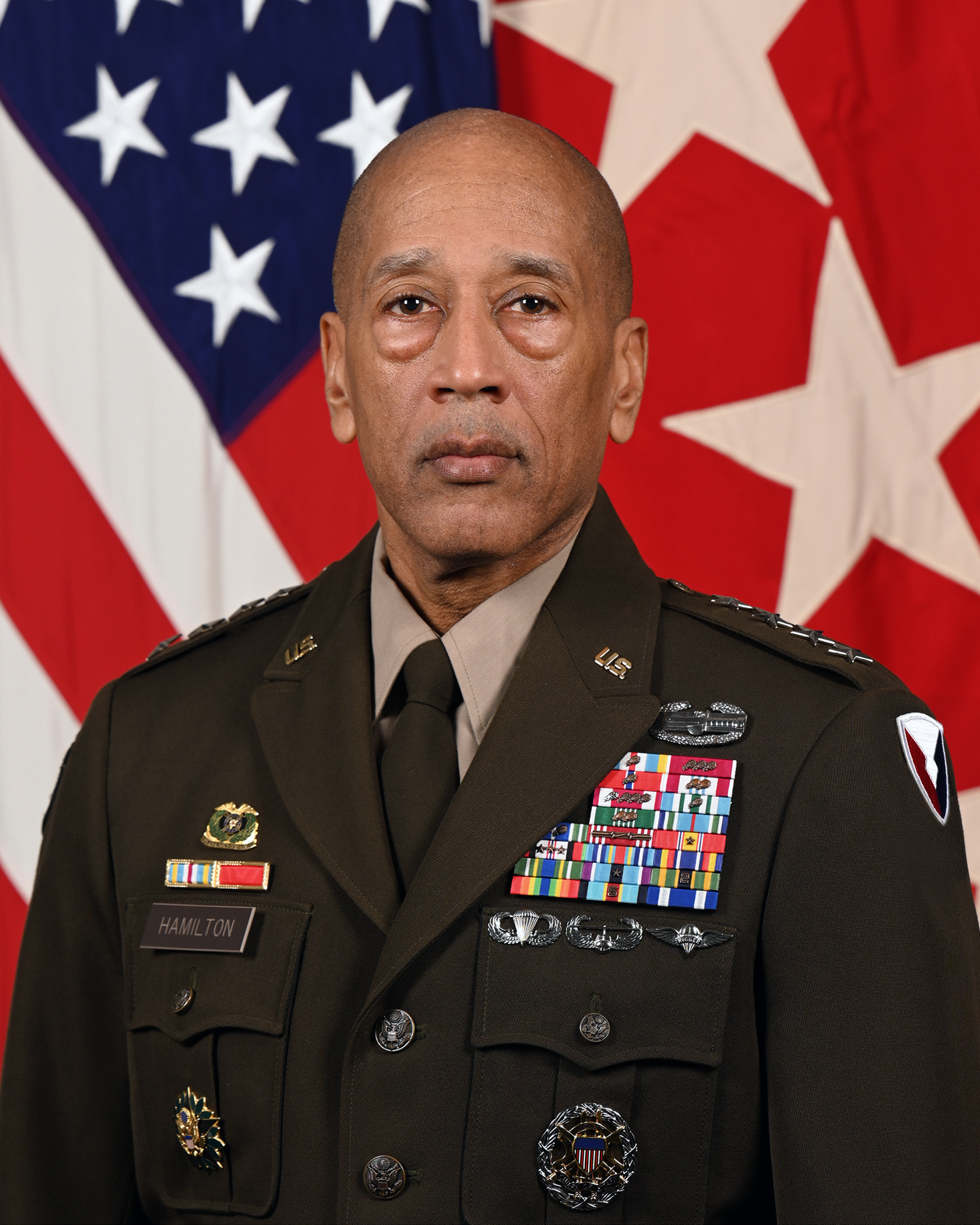
- Hamilton as a four-star general in 2023
- Born: Houston, Texas, U.S.
- Military career
- Allegiance: United States
- Branch: United States Army
- Service years: 1981–2025
- Rank: General (Retired as Lieutenant General)
- Commands: United States Army Materiel Command; 8th Theater Sustainment Command; Defense Logistics Agency Troop Support; 101st Sustainment Brigade
- Conflicts: War in Afghanistan
- Awards: Defense Superior Service Medal (2); Legion of Merit (4); Bronze Star Medal (2)
- Other work: Founder, C3R Hamilton Consulting Group, LLC

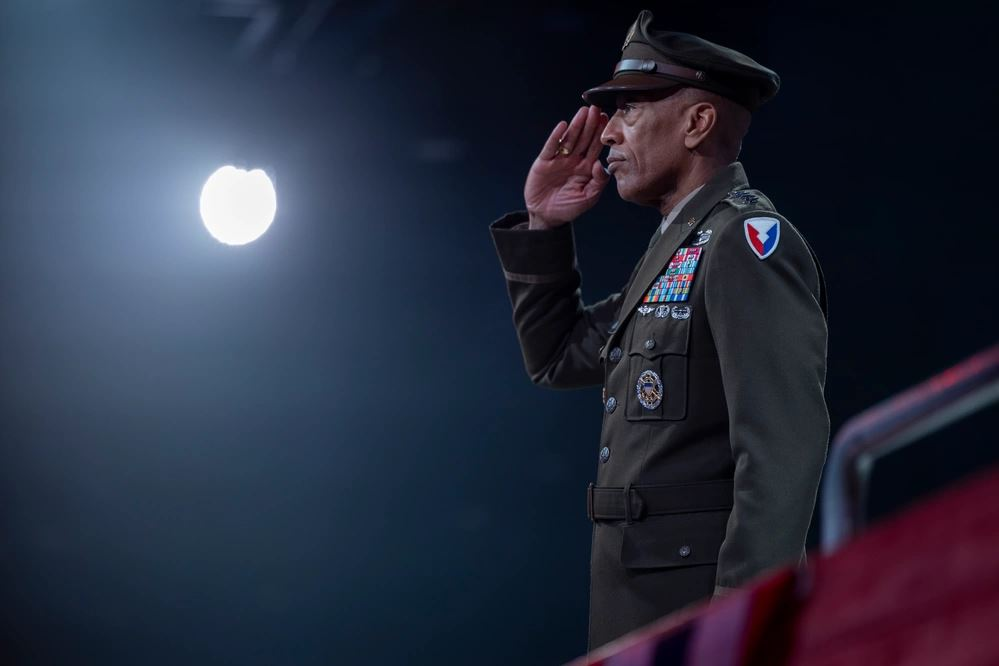
Charles R. Hamilton

Charles R. Hamilton is a retired United States Army officer who served in various logistics and command roles during his 43-year military career. He most recently served as the commanding general of the United States Army Materiel Command from March 16, 2023, to March 22, 2024.

== Early life and education ==
Hamilton was born in Houston, Texas, and enlisted in the United States Army in 1982. After completing basic and individual training, he was assigned to Fort Hood, Texas. In 1988, he graduated from Officer Candidate School as a Distinguished Military Graduate and was commissioned as a second lieutenant in the Quartermaster Corps.

Hamilton earned a Bachelor of Science in Business Administration from Virginia State University in 1990. He later received a Master of Public Administration from Central Michigan University and a Master of Military Studies from the Marine Corps University. He is a graduate of the Secretary of Defense Corporate Fellows Program, a component of the Senior Service College Fellowship.

He also attended executive education at the Center for Creative Leadership in Colorado Springs (Leadership at the Peak) and Harvard Business School, where he completed programs in corporate performance, private equity, and venture capital.

== Military career ==
Hamilton enlisted in the Army in 1981. He earned his commission via Officer Candidate School in the Quartermaster Corps, as distinguished military graduate, in 1988. Hamilton held a variety of command and staff positions throughout his career:

- Commanding General, United States Army Materiel Command
- Deputy Chief of Staff for Logistics (G-4), United States Army
- Assistant Deputy Chief of Staff for Logistics
- Deputy Chief of Staff for Logistics and Operations, Army Materiel Command
- Commander, 8th Theater Sustainment Command
- Commander, Defense Logistics Agency Troop Support
- Commander, 101st Sustainment Brigade

Hamilton deployed multiple times to Afghanistan in support of Operation Enduring Freedom, including assignments leading logistics and sustainment operations.

His previous positions also included service as:

- Chief of Staff, USFOR-A South/Southwest, Kandahar Airfield
- Executive Officer to the Army Deputy Chief of Staff, G-4
- Deputy Assistant Chief of Staff, United Nations Command / United States Forces Korea

He was promoted to four-star general in March 2023 and assumed command of the U.S. Army Materiel Command, overseeing global logistics and sustainment operations across the Army. In this role, Hamilton led a workforce of 190,000 military, civilian, and contractor personnel, impacting all 50 U.S. states and more than 150 countries with an annual budget of over $50 billion.

He also served on several Department of Defense boards, including as chairman of the Defense Commissary Agency and the Army & Air Force Exchange Board of Directors.

=== Relief of Command and Retirement ===
On March 22, 2024, Hamilton was suspended from his duties as commanding general of Army Materiel Command by Secretary of the Army, pending an investigation into allegations that he had influenced the Battalion Commander Assessment Program on behalf of a former subordinate officer. The matter was referred to the Department of Defense Office of Inspector General. Hamilton denied the allegations, stating his advocacy was transparent and motivated by concerns about racial bias in the selection process.

Following the conclusion of the investigation, Hamilton was officially relieved of command on December 10, 2024. In a statement following his relief, Hamilton reflected on his career: "It was my honor to serve our nation, and I've been blessed beyond what I've deserved to lead our troops for the past 43 years." He subsequently retired after more than four decades of service to the United States Army.

== Later career ==
After retiring, Hamilton founded C3R Hamilton Consulting Group, LLC, a strategic consulting firm specializing in corporate operations, supply chain optimization, and national security issues.

He has also appeared as a commentator on national security issues for outlets including Fox News and the BBC, discussing ceasefire proposals in the Middle East and the war in Ukraine.

== Publications ==
Hamilton has written and co-authored several works on logistics and sustainment, including:

- "101st Validates for Deployment" (2013)
- "The Road to Predictive Logistics" (2019)
- "Driving Readiness at Echelon" (2022)
- "The Art and Science of Educating Today's Sustainers for Tomorrow's Operations" (2023)

He was frequently cited in military and defense publications for his views on predictive sustainment, contested logistics, and modernization of the Army's materiel enterprise.

== Awards and decorations ==
Hamilton's decorations include:

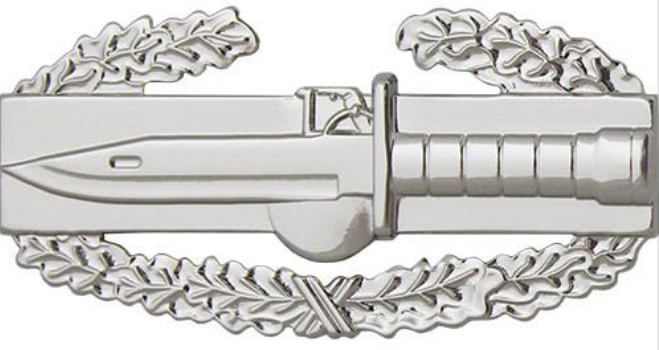

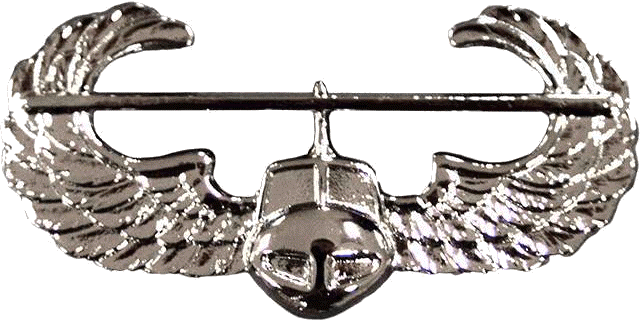

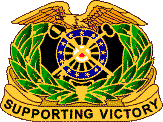

Combat Action Badge
Defense Superior Service Medal with bronze oak leaf cluster
Legion of Merit with three bronze oak leaf clusters	Bronze Star Medal with bronze oak leaf cluster	Defense Meritorious Service Medal with two bronze oak leaf clusters
Meritorious Service Medal with four with three bronze oak leaf clusters	Joint Service Commendation Medal with bronze oak leaf cluster	Army Commendation Medal with two bronze oak leaf clusters
Joint Service Achievement Medal with one bronze oak leaf cluster	Army Achievement Medal with one bronze oak leaf cluster and one silver oak leaf cluster	Army Good Conduct Medal with bronze clasp with 2 loops
National Defense Service Medal with bronze service star	Afghanistan Campaign Medal with three bronze service stars	Global War on Terrorism Expeditionary Medal
Global War on Terrorism Service Medal	Korea Defense Service Medal	Humanitarian Service Medal with bronze service star
Non-Commissioned Officer Professional Development Ribbon with Award numeral 2	Army Service Ribbon	Army Overseas Service RibbonAward numeral 5
NATO Medal with Non-Article 5	Joint Meritorious Unit Award	Meritorious Unit Commendation
Army Basic Parachutist Badge	Parachute Rigger Badge	Air Assault Badge
Army Quartermaster Corps regimental insignia		Army Materiel CommandShoulder sleeve insignia
Army Staff Identification Badge		Office of the Secretary of Defense Identification Badge

Hamilton was awarded an Honorary Doctorate of Humane Letters by Virginia State University and was inducted into the Officer Candidate School Hall of Fame.

Military offices
Preceded by Steven A. Shapiro	Commander of the Defense Logistics Agency Troop Support; 2015–2017	Succeeded by Mark Simerly
Preceded by Michel M. Russell Sr.	Director of Logistics of United States Forces Korea and Deputy Director of Logistics of United Nations Command and ROK/US Combined Forces Command; 2017–2018	Succeeded by David Wilson
Preceded by Susan A. Davidson	Commanding General of the 8th Theater Sustainment Command; 2018–2020	Succeeded by David Wilson
Preceded by Flem Walker	Deputy Chief of Staff for Logistics and Operations of United States Army Materiel Command; 2020–2021	Succeeded by Rodney D. Fogg
Preceded by Michel M. Russell Sr.	Director of Operations of the Office of the Deputy Chief of Staff for Logistics; 2021–2022	Succeeded by Heidi J. Hoyle
Preceded by Duane A. Gamble	Deputy Chief of Staff for Logistics of the United States Army; 2022–2023	Succeeded by John E. Hall; Acting
Preceded by Edward M. Daly	Commanding General of United States Army Materiel Command; 2023–2024	Succeeded by Christopher O. Mohan; Acting
