= Michelle C. Skubic =

US Navy officer (born c. 1966)

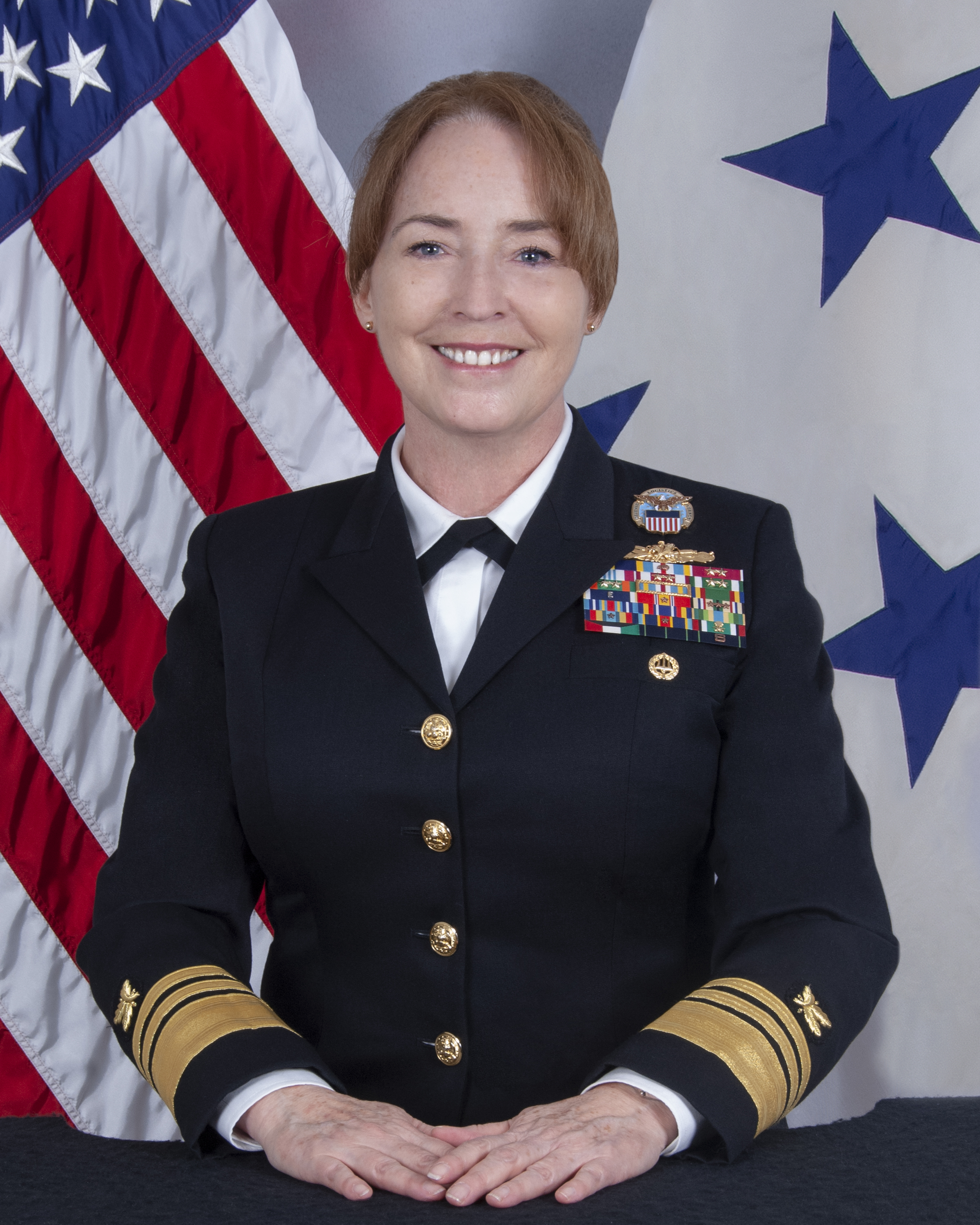
- Skubic in 2020
- Born: c. 1961 (age 64–65)
- Alma mater: California State University, Fullerton (BA); Naval War College (MS)
- Military career
- Allegiance: United States
- Branch: United States Navy
- Service years: 1988–2024
- Rank: Vice Admiral
- Commands: Defense Logistics Agency; Naval Supply System Command; Navy Supply Corps
- Conflicts: Gulf War
- Awards: Navy Distinguished Service Medal; Defense Superior Service Medal (2); Legion of Merit (3)

Michelle Coyne Skubic (born c. 1961) is a retired United States Navy officer who served as the director of the Defense Logistics Agency from 2020 to 2024.

== Early life and education ==
Skubic is a 1988 graduate of California State University, Fullerton, with a Bachelor of Arts in Business Administration-Finance. She earned a Master of Science in Acquisition and Contract Management from the Naval Postgraduate School in 2001. She is also a graduate of the Joint Forces Staff College and the University of North Carolina Kenan-Flagler Executive Development Institute.

== Career ==
Skubic is designated as a Naval Aviation and Surface Warfare Supply Corps officer and is a member of the Defense Acquisition Corps.

Skubic's operational assignments include: division officer in readiness and services billets, aboard USS Acadia (AD-42), which included deployment for Operations Desert Shield and Desert Storm; supply officer aboard Precommissioning Unit (PCU) USS McFaul (DDG-74), built in Pascagoula, Mississippi; and supply officer aboard PCU USS George H. W. Bush (CVN-77), built in Newport News, Virginia, which was commissioned to the fleet in January 2009. Additionally, she completed a tour forward-deployed as commander, Defense Logistics Agency (DLA) Support Team in Kuwait, where her team, in concert with other DLA activities, supported United States Central Command, United States Army Central and other department of defense organizations in sustaining the warfighter's requirements for Operations New Dawn and Enduring Freedom.

Skubic's shore assignments include: services officer and carrier readiness officer at Commander, Naval Air Force, United States Pacific Fleet, San Diego; combined bachelor quarters officer and aviation support division officer, Naval Air Station Sigonella, Sicily; deputy department head for program contracts, Naval Air Systems Command at Patuxent River, Maryland; deputy force supply officer, Commander, Naval Surface Forces, San Diego; director of supplier operations, DLA Aviation, Richmond, Virginia; commanding officer, Naval Supply Systems Command (NAVSUP) Fleet Logistics Center Norfolk, Virginia; chief of staff, NAVSUP, Mechanicsburg, Pennsylvania; director, Logistics, Fleet Supply and Ordnance, U.S. Pacific Fleet, Joint Base Pearl Harbor-Hickam, Hawaii; commander, DLA Land and Maritime, Columbus, Ohio and Commander, Naval Supply Systems Command (NAVSUP) and 48th Chief of Supply Corps.

Skubic became director of the Defense Logistics Agency on July 24, 2020.

== Awards and decorations ==
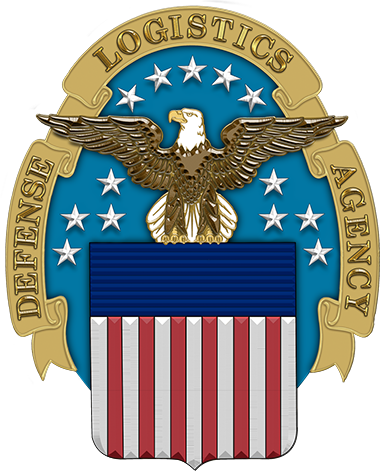

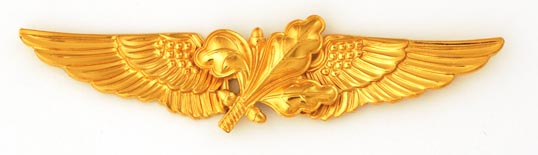

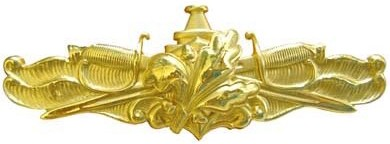

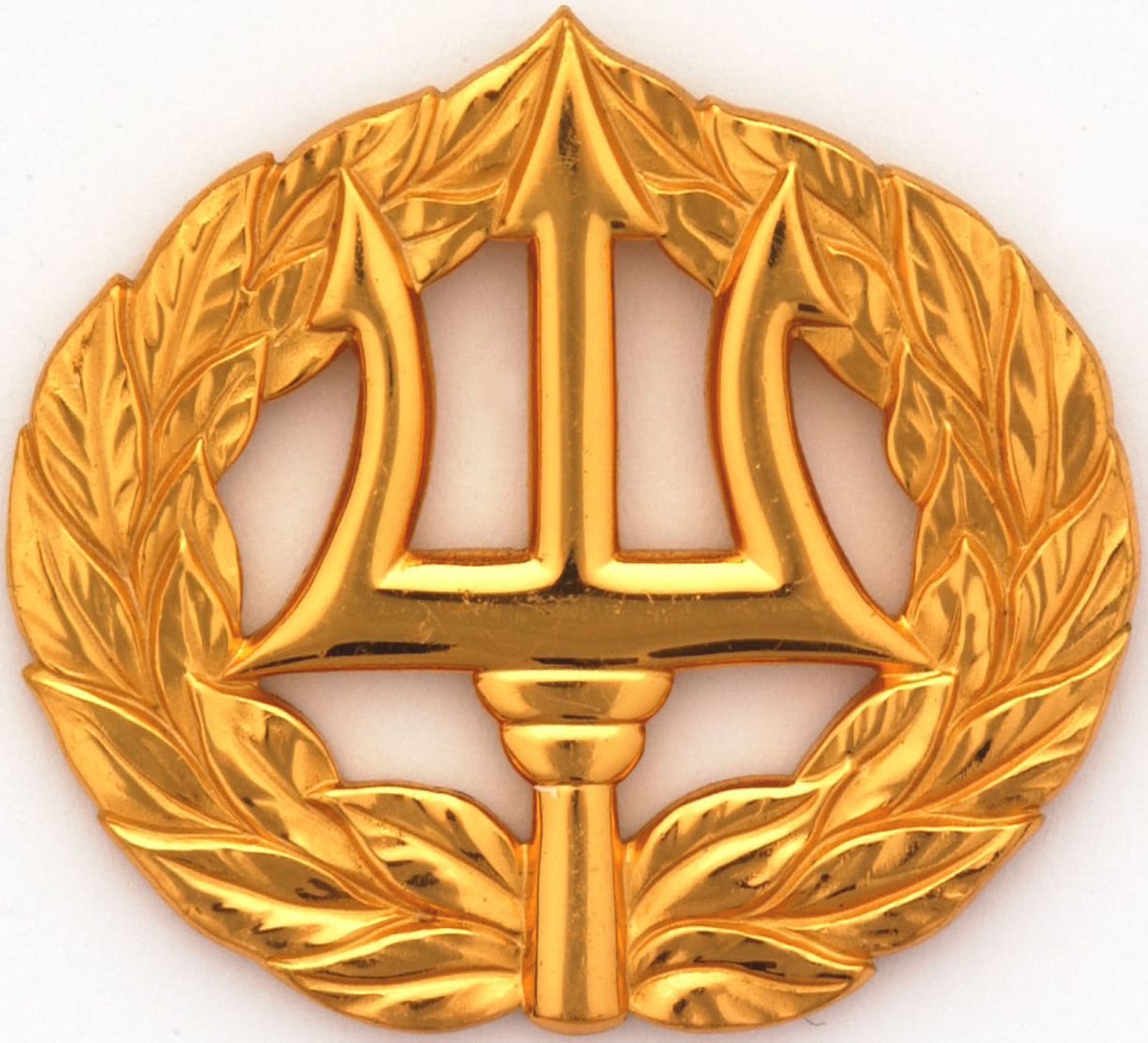

Defense Logistics Agency Identification Badge
Navy Aviation Warfare Supply Corps Officer Pin
Navy Surface Warfare Supply Corps Officer Pin
Navy Distinguished Service Medal	Defense Superior Service Medal with bronze oak leaf cluster	Legion of Merit with two award stars
Defense Meritorious Service Medal	Meritorious Service Medal with two award stars	Navy and Marine Corps Commendation Medal with two award stars
Navy and Marine Corps Achievement Medal with two award stars	Joint Meritorious Unit Award	Navy Unit Commendation
Navy "E" Ribbon, 1st award	National Defense Service Medal with bronze service star	Southwest Asia Service Medal with three bronze service stars
Global War on Terrorism Expeditionary Medal	Global War on Terrorism Service Medal	Armed Forces Service Medal
Navy Sea Service Deployment Ribbon with bronze service star	Navy and Marine Corps Overseas Service Ribbon with bronze service star	Kuwait Liberation Medal (Saudi Arabia)
Kuwait Liberation Medal (Kuwait)	Navy Rifle Marksmanship Ribbon	Navy Pistol Marksmanship Ribbon with Sharpshooter Device
Navy Command Ashore insignia

Military offices
Preceded by ???	Director of Logistics, Fleet Supply, and Ordnance of the United States Pacific Fleet; 2014–2016	Succeeded by John T. Palmer
Preceded by John G. King	Commander of the Defense Logistics Agency Land and Maritime; 2016–2018	Succeeded by John T. Palmer
Preceded by Jonathan A. Yuen	Commander of the Naval Supply Systems Command; 2018–2020	Succeeded by Peter Stamatopoulos
Preceded by Darrell K. Williams	Director of the Defense Logistics Agency; 2020–2024	Succeeded by Mark Simerly
