= Flem Walker =

U.S. Army general

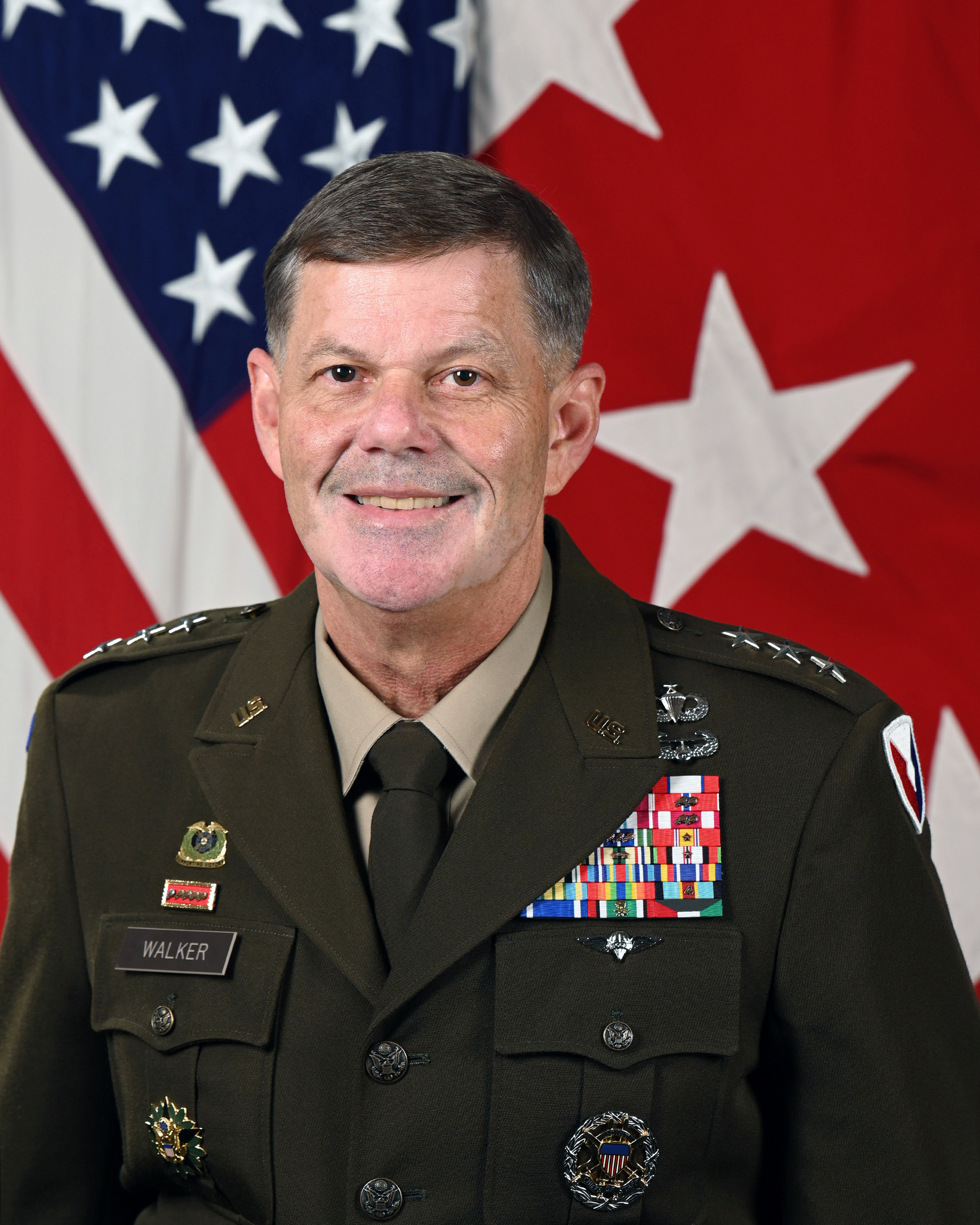
- Official portrait, 2022
- Born: Clay County, Alabama, U.S.
- Military career
- Allegiance: United States
- Branch: United States Army
- Service years: 1987–2022
- Rank: Lieutenant General
- Nickname: Donnie
- Commands: 1st Theater Sustainment Command; 3rd Sustainment Command (Expeditionary)
- Conflicts: Gulf War; War in Afghanistan; Iraq War
- Awards: Army Distinguished Service Medal; Legion of Merit (5); Bronze Star Medal (3)

Flem Bowen Walker Jr. is a retired United States Army lieutenant general who last served as the Deputy Commanding General and Chief of Staff of the United States Army Materiel Command from 2020 to 2022. Previously, he served as the Deputy Chief of Staff for Logistics and Operations of the United States Army Materiel Command.

His retirement ceremony was held on September 1, 2022.

== Awards and decorations ==
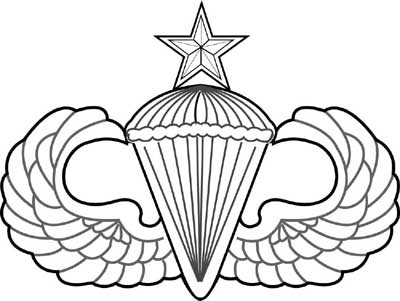
Senior Parachutist Badge
Air Assault Badge
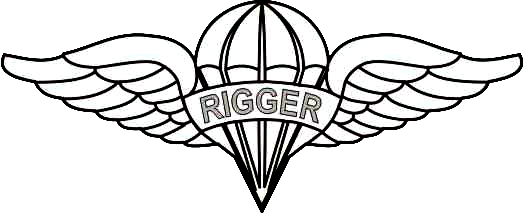
Parachute Rigger Badge
Office of the Joint Chiefs of Staff Identification Badge
82nd Airborne Division Combat Service Identification Badge
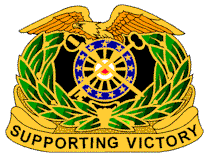
U.S. Army Quartermaster Corps Distinctive Unit Insignia
6 Overseas Service Bars

Army Distinguished Service Medal
Legion of Merit with four bronze oak leaf clusters
Bronze Star Medal with two oak leaf clusters
Defense Meritorious Service Medal with oak leaf cluster
Meritorious Service Medal with two oak leaf clusters
Army Commendation Medal with oak leaf cluster
Army Achievement Medal with three bronze oak leaf clusters
Meritorious Unit Commendation with one silver and four bronze oak leaf clusters
National Defense Service Medal with one bronze service star
Armed Forces Expeditionary Medal
Southwest Asia Service Medal with two service stars
Afghanistan Campaign Medal with service star
Iraq Campaign Medal with two service stars
Global War on Terrorism Expeditionary Medal
Global War on Terrorism Service Medal
Military Outstanding Volunteer Service Medal
Army Service Ribbon
Army Overseas Service Ribbon with bronze award numeral 4
NATO Medal for the former Yugoslavia
Kuwait Liberation Medal (Saudi Arabia)
Kuwait Liberation Medal (Kuwait)

Military offices
Preceded by Kristin K. French	Commanding General of the 3rd Sustainment Command (Expeditionary); 2013–2015	Succeeded by Christopher J. Sharpsten
Preceded by Paul C. Hurley Jr.	Deputy Chief of Staff for Logistics of the United States Army Forces Command; 2015–2017	Succeeded by Ronald Kirklin
Preceded by Paul C. Hurley Jr.	Commanding General of the 1st Theater Sustainment Command; 2017–2019	Succeeded by John P. Sullivan
Preceded by Christopher O. Mohan	Deputy Chief of Staff for Logistics and Operations of the United States Army Materiel Command; 2019–2020	Succeeded by Charles R. Hamilton
Preceded by Edward M. Daly	Deputy Commanding General and Chief of Staff of the United States Army Materiel Command; 2020–2022	Succeeded by Christopher Mohan
