= David Wilson (U.S. Army general) =

U.S. Army general

Lieutenant General David Wilson
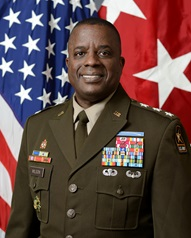
- Official portrait, 2025
- Military career
- Allegiance: United States
- Branch: United States Army
- Service years: 1991–2025
- Rank: Lieutenant General
- Commands: United States Army Sustainment Command; 8th Theater Sustainment Command; Chief of Ordnance; United States Army Ordnance School; 406th Army Field Support Brigade; 121st Brigade Support Battalion
- Conflicts: Operation Continue Hope; Operation Uphold Democracy; Iraq War
- Awards: Army Distinguished Service Medal (3); Defense Superior Service Medal; Legion of Merit (3); Bronze Star Medal (2)

David Wilson was a United States Army lieutenant general who final position was serving as the deputy chief of staff for installations of the U.S. Army from September 2024 to November 2025. Before that he served as the commanding general of the United States Army Sustainment Command from 2022 to 2024. He previously served as the Commanding General of 8th Theater Sustainment Command at Fort Shafter, Hawaii from 2020 to 2022. He previously served as the Director J/U-4, United States Forces Korea/United Nations Command/Deputy Director, C4 Combined Forces Command located in Camp Humphreys, Republic of Korea and as the 40th Chief of Ordnance and Commandant of the United States Army Ordnance School at Fort Lee, Virginia.

== Biography ==
=== Early life and education ===
Wilson is a native of Charleston, South Carolina. He received his commission and a Bachelor of Science degree in Business Administration from The Citadel, the Military College of South Carolina. He holds a Master of Science in General Administration from Central Michigan University, Mount Pleasant, Michigan and a Master of Science in National Resource Strategy from the Industrial College of the Armed forces. His military education includes the Field Artillery Officer Basic Course, the Ordnance Officer Transition Course, the Combined Logistics Officer Advanced Course, the Combined Arms and Services Staff School, the Command and General Staff Officer Course, and the Industrial College of the Armed Forces.

=== U.S. Army officer ===
Upon completion of the Field Artillery Officer Basic Course, Wilson was assigned as a Fire Support Officer for the 1st Battalion, 5th Infantry at Camp Hovey, Korea; Platoon Leader, 503rd Maintenance Company, 530th Supply & Services Battalion; Company Executive Officer, 364th Supply and Services Company, 264th Corps Support Battalion with deployment to Mogadishu, Somalia; Platoon Leader and Shop Officer, 503rd Maintenance Company, 264th Corps Support Battalion; and Support Operations Maintenance Officer, 264th Corps Support Battalion, with deployment to Haiti.

In 1996, Wilson was assigned as the Assistant Brigade S4, 2d Brigade, 3rd Infantry Division (Mechanized), Fort Stewart Georgia. He assumed command of Delta Company, 703d Main Support Battalion in 1997 after serving as the 3d Division Material Management Center, 1st Brigade Material Manager, where he deployed in support of Operations Desert Thunder. He then served in the Headquarters, United States Army Training and Doctrine Command at Fort Monroe, Virginia, in the Joint Venture Directorate as Experimental CSS Integration Officer for the Army Light Experimentation Axis and then as Executive Officer to the Deputy Chief of Staff for Combat Developments.

Following completion of the Command and General Staff Officer Course in 2003, Wilson was assigned as the Executive Officer for the 1st Armored Division, Division Support Command, Germany with deployment to Iraq in support of Operation Iraqi Freedom and Operation Iron Saber. Additional assignments include Battalion Executive Officer, 501st Forward Support Battalion (2004); Assistant Chief of Staff, Deputy G4, 1st Armored Division Headquarters (2005); and Logistics Majors Assignment Officer, U.S. Army Human Resources Command (2006).

In 2008, Wilson assumed command of the 121st Brigade Support Battalion, 1st Armored Division, Fort Bliss, Texas. Following a deployment in support of Operation Iraqi Freedom, Wilson reported to the Office of the Chief of Staff of the Army where he served as the Logistics Colonels Assignment Officer. In 2011, Wilson attended the Industrial College of the Armed Forces and then reported to Fort Bragg, North Carolina, to assume command of the 406th Army Field Support Brigade. Following brigade command in 2014, he was assigned to United States Army Materiel Command (AMC) as the Executive Officer to the AMC Commanding General. On 10 August 2016, Wilson became the 40th Chief of Ordnance and assumed command of the United States Army Ordnance School.

Before assuming command of the U.S. Army Sustainment Command, Wilson served as the 8th Commanding General of the 8th Theater Sustainment Command United States Army Pacific, Fort Shaftner, Hawaii.

Wilson has participated in numerous military operations; to include, Operation Restore/Continue Hope in Somalia, Operation Uphold Democracy in Haiti, Operation Desert Thunder/Desert Fox in Kuwait, and multiple deployments to Iraq for the Iraq War.

In July 2024, Wilson was nominated for promotion to lieutenant general and assignment as deputy chief of staff for installations. He held that position until his retirement in November 2025.

== Awards and decorations ==
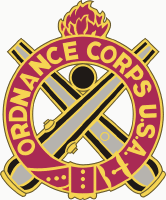
Combat Action Badge
Expert Infantryman Badge
Basic Parachutist Badge
Air Assault Badge
Army Staff Identification Badge
1st Armored Division Combat Service Identification Badge
Army Ordnance Corps Distinctive Unit Insignia
7 Overseas Service Bars

Army Distinguished Service Medal with two bronze oak leaf clusters
Defense Superior Service Medal
Legion of Merit with two bronze oak leaf clusters
Bronze Star Medal with oak leaf cluster
Meritorious Service Medal with four oak leaf clusters
Army Commendation Medal with silver oak leaf cluster

Joint Service Achievement Medal
Army Presidential Unit Citation
Army Achievement Medal with silver oak leaf cluster

Joint Meritorious Unit Award
Army Valorous Unit Award
Army Meritorious Unit Commendation
Army Superior Unit Award with two oak leaf clusters
National Defense Service Medal with one bronze service star
Armed Forces Expeditionary Medal with two service stars
Iraq Campaign Medal with three service stars
Global War on Terrorism Expeditionary Medal
Global War on Terrorism Service Medal
Korea Defense Service Medal
Humanitarian Service Medal with service star
Military Outstanding Volunteer Service Medal with service star
Armed Forces Reserve Medal

NCO Professional Development Ribbon
Army Service Ribbon
Army Overseas Service Ribbon with bronze award numeral 6
United Nations Medal with service star

=== Other honors ===
Wilson is a Distinguished Military Graduate of The Citadel, The Military College of South Carolina. He holds an honorary doctorate of Military Science from The Citadel, The Military College of South Carolina. He has been awarded the General Brehon V. Somervell Medal and has been recognized as a Demonstrated Master Logistician by the International Society of Logistics. Wilson is a member of the Ordnance Order of Samuel Sharpe and the Field Artillery Order of Saint Barbara.

Military offices
Preceded by Kurt J. Ryan	Chief of Ordnance of the United States Army; 2016–2018	Succeeded by Heidi J. Hoyle
Preceded by Charles R. Hamilton	Director of Logistics of the United States Forces Korea and Deputy Director of Logistics of the United Nations Command and ROK/US Combined Forces Command; 2018–2020	Succeeded by Mark T. Simerly
Preceded by Charles R. Hamilton	Commanding General of the 8th Theater Sustainment Command; 2020–2022	Succeeded by Jered P. Helwig
Preceded by Christopher O. Mohan	Commanding General of the United States Army Sustainment Command; 2022–2024	Succeeded by John B. Hinson
Preceded by Daniel M. Klippstein; Acting	Deputy Chief of Staff for Installations of the United States Army; 2024–present	Incumbent
