= Mark Simerly =

U.S. Army general

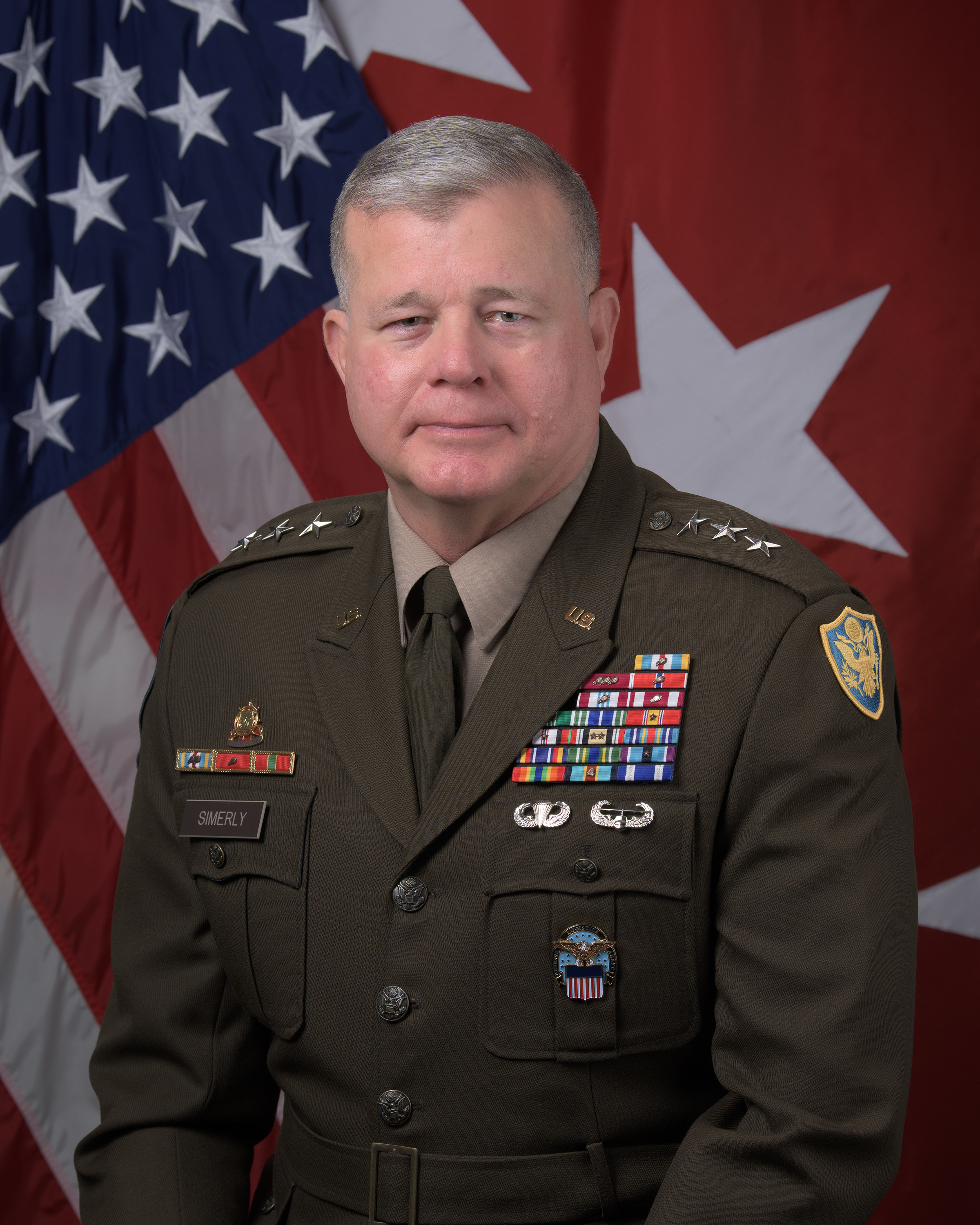
- Official portrait, 2024
- Alma mater: University of Richmond, Virginia (BA); National Defense University; United States Army Command and General Staff College; "US Army Maj. Gen. Mark Simerly, Commanding General, Combined Arms Support Command (CASCOM)". Defense Logistics Agency.
- Military career
- Allegiance: United States
- Branch: United States Army
- Service years: 1984–Present
- Rank: Lieutenant General
- Commands: Defense Logistics Agency; United States Army Combined Arms Support Command; Sustainment Center of Excellence; 19th Expeditionary Sustainment Command; Defense Logistics Agency Troop Support; 4th Sustainment Brigade; 704th Brigade Support Battalion
- Conflicts: War in Afghanistan; Iraq War
- Awards: Defense Superior Service Medal (2); Legion of Merit (4); Bronze Star Medal (2)

Mark T. Simerly is a retired United States Army lieutenant general who last served as the director of the Defense Logistics Agency through September 30, 2026, passing command of DLA over to Air Force Lt. Gen. David Sanford. He previously served as the commanding general of the United States Army Combined Arms Support Command, United States Army Sustainment Center of Excellence and Fort Gregg-Adams from 2021 to 2023. He previously served as the Director of Logistics of the United States Forces Korea and Deputy Director of Logistics of the United Nations Command and ROK/US Combined Forces Command and, prior to that, as the Commanding General of the 19th Expeditionary Sustainment Command.

== Military career ==
In March 2023, Simerly was nominated and confirmed for promotion to lieutenant general. Simerly retired from military service on September 30, 2026.

== Awards and decorations ==
Simely's awards and decorations include:

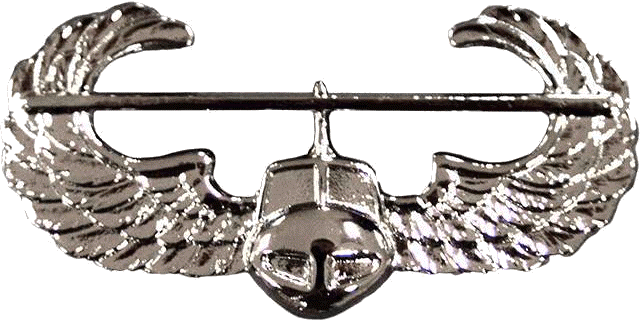

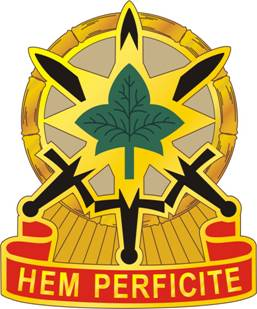

Defense Superior Service Medal with bronze oak leaf cluster		Legion of Merit with three bronze oak leaf clusters
Bronze Star Medal with bronze oak leaf cluster	Defense Meritorious Service Medal with silver oak leaf cluster	Meritorious Service Medal with two oak leaf clusters
Army Commendation Medal with bronze oak leaf cluster	Army Achievement Medal with bronze oak leaf cluster	National Defense Service Medal with star
Afghanistan Campaign Medal with star	Iraq Campaign Medal with two stars	Global War on Terrorism Expeditionary Medal
Global War on Terrorism Service Medal	Korea Defense Service Medal	Humanitarian Service Medal with star
Army Service Ribbon	Army Overseas Service; Award numeral 4	NATO Medal; Non-Article 5
Joint Meritorious Unit Award with two bronze oak leaf clusters	Meritorious Unit Award with bronze oak leaf cluster	Army Superior Unit Award
1st Cavalry Division; Distinctive unit insignia	Basic Parachutist Badge	Air Assault Badge
4th Sustainment Brigade Distinctive unit insignia
Defense Logistics Agency's emblem

Other accoutrements
5 Overseas Service Bars

Military offices
Preceded by Charles R. Hamilton	Commander of the Defense Logistics Agency Troop Support; 2017–2019	Succeeded by Gavin A. Lawrence
Preceded by Michel M. Russell Sr.	Commanding General of the 19th Expeditionary Sustainment Command; 2019–2020	Succeeded by Steven L. Allen
Preceded by David Wilson	Director of Logistics of the United States Forces Korea and Deputy Director of Logistics of the United Nations Command and ROK/US Combined Forces Command; 2020–2021	Succeeded by Timothy P. White
Preceded by Rodney D. Fogg	Commanding General of the United States Army Combined Arms Support Command; 2021–2023	Succeeded by Michelle K. Donahue
Preceded by Michelle C. Skubic	Director of the Defense Logistics Agency; 2024–2026	Succeeded by David J. Sanford
