= Edward M. Daly =

US Army general (born 1965)

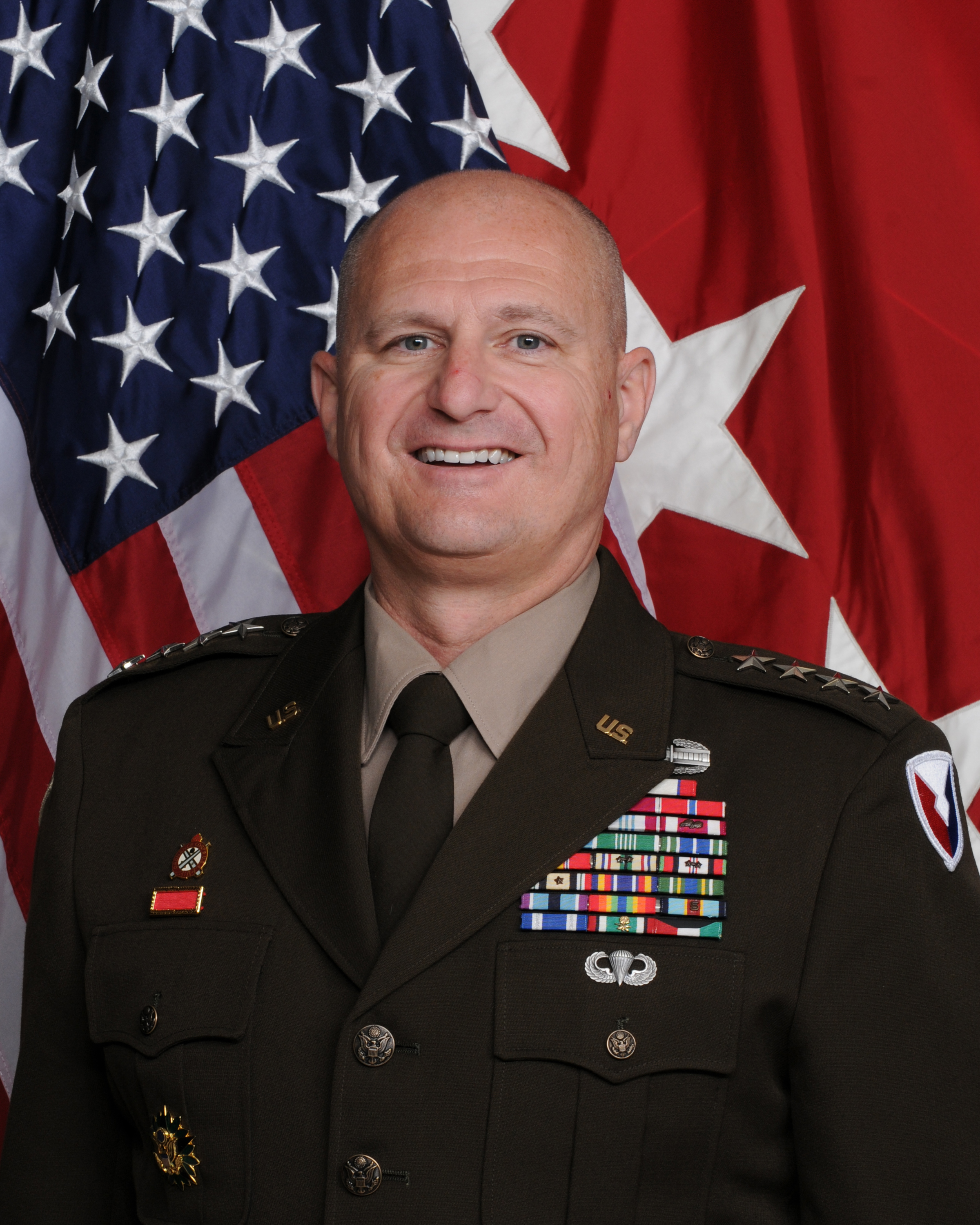
- Daly in 2020
- Born: 16 August 1965 (age 61); Jersey City, New Jersey, U.S.
- Military career
- Allegiance: United States
- Branch: United States Army
- Service years: 1987–2023
- Rank: General
- Commands: United States Army Materiel Command; United States Army Sustainment Command; Chief of Ordnance; 43rd Sustainment Brigade; 702nd Main Support Battalion
- Conflicts: Gulf War; War in Afghanistan; Iraq War
- Awards: Army Distinguished Service Medal (2); Legion of Merit; Bronze Star Medal

Edward Michael Daly (born 16 August 1965) is a retired four-star general in the United States Army who last served as the 20th commanding general of the U.S. Army Materiel Command from 2020 to 2023. He previously served as the deputy commanding general of Army Materiel Command from 7 August 2017 to 2 July 2020.

In his previous assignment, Daly served as the Commanding General of Army Sustainment Command, where he executed Army Materiel Commands' mission to deliver readiness. Prior to commanding ASC, he served as Army Materiel Command's Deputy Chief of Staff, overseeing the roles and functions of the Headquarters staff.

== Education ==
Daly was raised in Jersey City, New Jersey, where he attended St. Peter's Preparatory School and graduated in 1983. Daly was commissioned as a second lieutenant in the United States Army Ordnance Corps upon his graduation from the United States Military Academy at West Point. He earned master's degrees in Business Administration from Gonzaga University, and in Strategic Studies from the United States Army War College.

== Military career ==
Daly was 37th Chief of Ordnance and Commandant of the United States Army Ordnance School. He also served as Executive Officer to the Deputy Chief of Staff, Army G-4; Commander of the 43rd Sustainment Brigade, 4th Infantry Division (Mechanized) at Fort Carson, Colorado, and deployed in support of Operation Enduring Freedom, Afghanistan; Deputy Assistant Chief of Staff/Chief Plans Officer, G-4, North Atlantic Treaty Organization Rapid Deployable Corps based in Italy and deployed in support of Operation Enduring Freedom and Operation Iraqi Freedom; and Commander of 702nd Main Support Battalion, Division Support Command, 2nd Infantry Division, Eighth Army, South Korea.

Earlier assignments as a company grade officer include various logistics and leadership roles with 1st Cavalry Division at Fort Hood, Texas; United States Army Europe; and Fort Bragg, North Carolina, where he deployed in support of Gulf War. He also served as assistant professor of Military Science at Gonzaga University in Spokane, Washington.

== Awards and decorations ==
Combat Action Badge
Basic Parachutist Badge
Army Staff Identification Badge
4th Infantry Division Patch CSIB
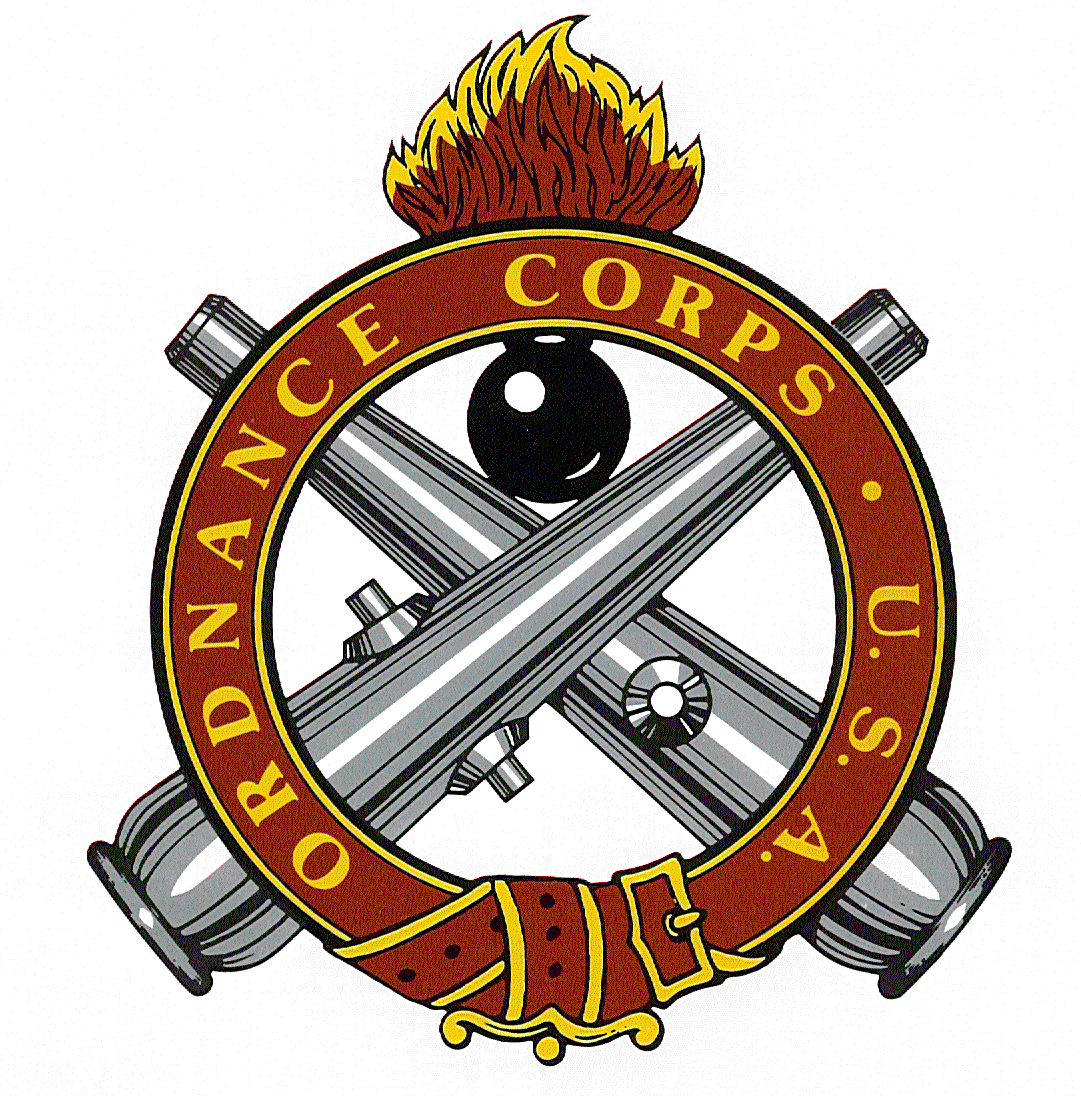
Army Ordnance Corps Distinctive Unit Insignia
5 Overseas Service Bars

Army Distinguished Service Medal with oak leaf cluster
Legion of Merit
Bronze Star Medal
Defense Meritorious Service Medal
Meritorious Service Medal with two oak leaf clusters
Joint Service Commendation Medal
Army Commendation Medal
Army Achievement Medal
Meritorious Unit Commendation
National Defense Service Medal with one bronze service star
Southwest Asia Service Medal with two service stars
Afghanistan Campaign Medal with two service stars
Iraq Campaign Medal with service star
Global War on Terrorism Service Medal
Korea Defense Service Medal
Humanitarian Service Medal
Army Service Ribbon
Army Overseas Service Ribbon with bronze award numeral 5
NATO Medal for service with ISAF
Kuwait Liberation Medal (Saudi Arabia)
Kuwait Liberation Medal (Kuwait)

Military offices
Preceded by Clark W. LeMasters Jr.	Chief of Ordnance of the United States Army; 2012–2013	Succeeded by John F. Haley
Preceded by Kevin G. O'Connell	Commanding General of United States Army Sustainment Command; 2016–2017	Succeeded by Duane Gamble
Preceded by Larry D. Wyche	Deputy Commanding General of United States Army Materiel Command; 2017–2020	Succeeded by Flem Walker
Preceded by Gustave F. Perna	Commanding General of United States Army Materiel Command; 2020–2023	Succeeded by Charles R. Hamilton
