= John F. Haley =

United States Army general

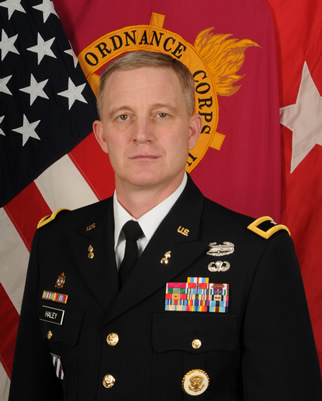
- Brigadier General John F. Haley
- Military career
- Allegiance: United States of America
- Branch: United States Army
- Service years: 1987-2017
- Rank: Brigadier General
- Commands: 593rd Expeditionary Sustainment Command; 38th Chief of Ordnance
- Awards: Defense Superior Service Medal; Legion of Merit (2)

Brigadier General John F. "Jack" Haley is a retired general officer in the United States Army and served as the 38th Chief of Ordnance and Commandant of the U.S. Army Ordnance School at Fort Lee, Virginia.

== Military education ==
Haley was commissioned a second lieutenant on July 8, 1987, following graduation from Saint Lawrence University in Canton, NY. He holds a Bachelor of Science Degree in Environmental Chemistry and a master's degree in National Security and Strategic Studies from the Naval War College.

== Military career ==
Upon completion of the Ordnance Officer Basic Course, Aberdeen Proving Ground, Maryland, he was assigned as the Operations Officer for the General Support Center in Germersheim, Germany. He then served as a Maintenance Platoon Leader and Shop Officer in the 546th Maintenance Company, 66th Maintenance Battalion in Pirmasens, Germany and as Aide-De-Camp for the Deputy Commanding General of the 21st Theater Support Command, Kaiserslautern, Germany.

Following completion of the Combined Logistics Officer Advanced Course in 1992, he was assigned as the I Corps Maintenance Officer at Fort Lewis, WA. In 1993, he was assigned as the Company Commander for the 85th Maintenance Company. He then served at the U.S. Army Personnel Command as a Plans Officer and as the Ordnance Branch Future Readiness Officer, Alexandria, VA.

In 1998, Haley was assigned as the 1st Infantry Division Support Command S-3 in Kitzingen, Germany. He then served as the Support Operations Officer and Executive Officer for the 701st Main Support Battalion. Following his tour of duty in the 1st Infantry Division, Haley was selected as the Military Assistant to the Vice President of the United States and served for two years at the White House.

Haley assumed command of the 703rd Main Support Battalion, 3rd Infantry Division, Forward Deployed, Iraq in 2003. During his three years in this position he successfully converted the battalion into the Army's first modular Brigade Support Battalion and deployed a second time to Southwest Asia in support of Operation Iraqi Freedom.

In 2007, Brigadier General Haley attended the Naval War College in Newport, RI. Upon graduation, he served as the Maintenance Division Chief in Headquarters, Department of the Army G4, Pentagon and subsequently commanded the 405th Army Field Support Brigade, Germany. In 2010, Brigadier General Haley was selected to serve as the Executive Officer to the Commanding General, Army Materiel Command and most recently as Special Assistant to the Commanding General, Army Materiel Command.

In 2013, Haley assumed command of the U.S. Army Ordnance School as its Commandant and became the 38th Chief of Ordnance at Fort Lee, Virginia.

Two years later, in 2015, Haley took command of the 593rd Expeditionary Sustainment Command. Following this assignment, Haley retired in 2017.

== Awards and decorations ==
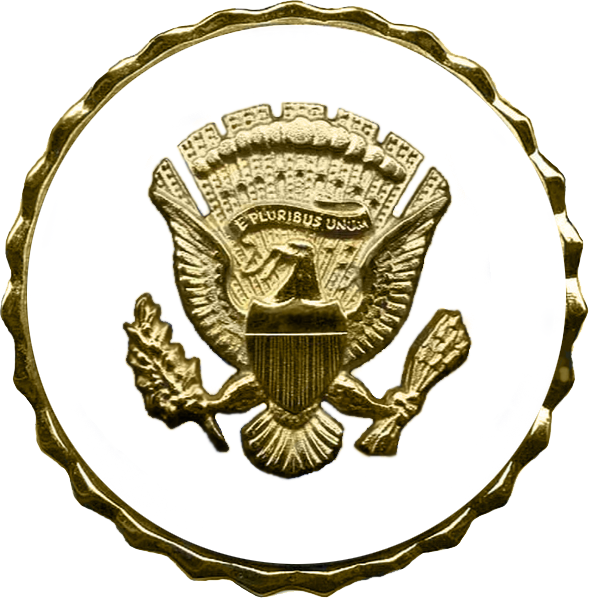
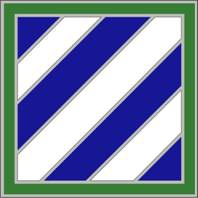
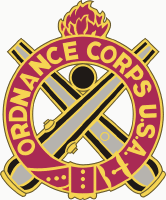
Combat Action Badge
Basic Parachutist Badge
Vice Presidential Service Badge
3rd Infantry Division Combat Service Identification Badge
Army Ordnance Corps Distinctive Unit Insignia
2 Overseas Service Bars

Defense Superior Service Medal
Legion of Merit with one bronze oak leaf cluster
Bronze Star Medal with oak leaf cluster
Meritorious Service Medal with four oak leaf clusters
Army Commendation Medal
Joint Service Achievement Medal
Army Achievement Medal with two oak leaf clusters
Joint Meritorious Unit Award
Valorous Unit Award
National Defense Service Medal with one bronze service star
Southwest Asia Service Medal with service star
Iraq Campaign Medal with two service stars
Global War on Terrorism Expeditionary Medal
Global War on Terrorism Service Medal
Humanitarian Service Medal
Armed Forces Reserve Medal
Army Service Ribbon
Army Overseas Service Ribbon with bronze award numeral ?

Military offices
Preceded by Lieutenant General Edward M. Daly	Chief of Ordnance of the United States Army; 2013 - 2015	Succeeded by Major General Kurt J. Ryan
