= Duane Gamble =

U.S. Army general

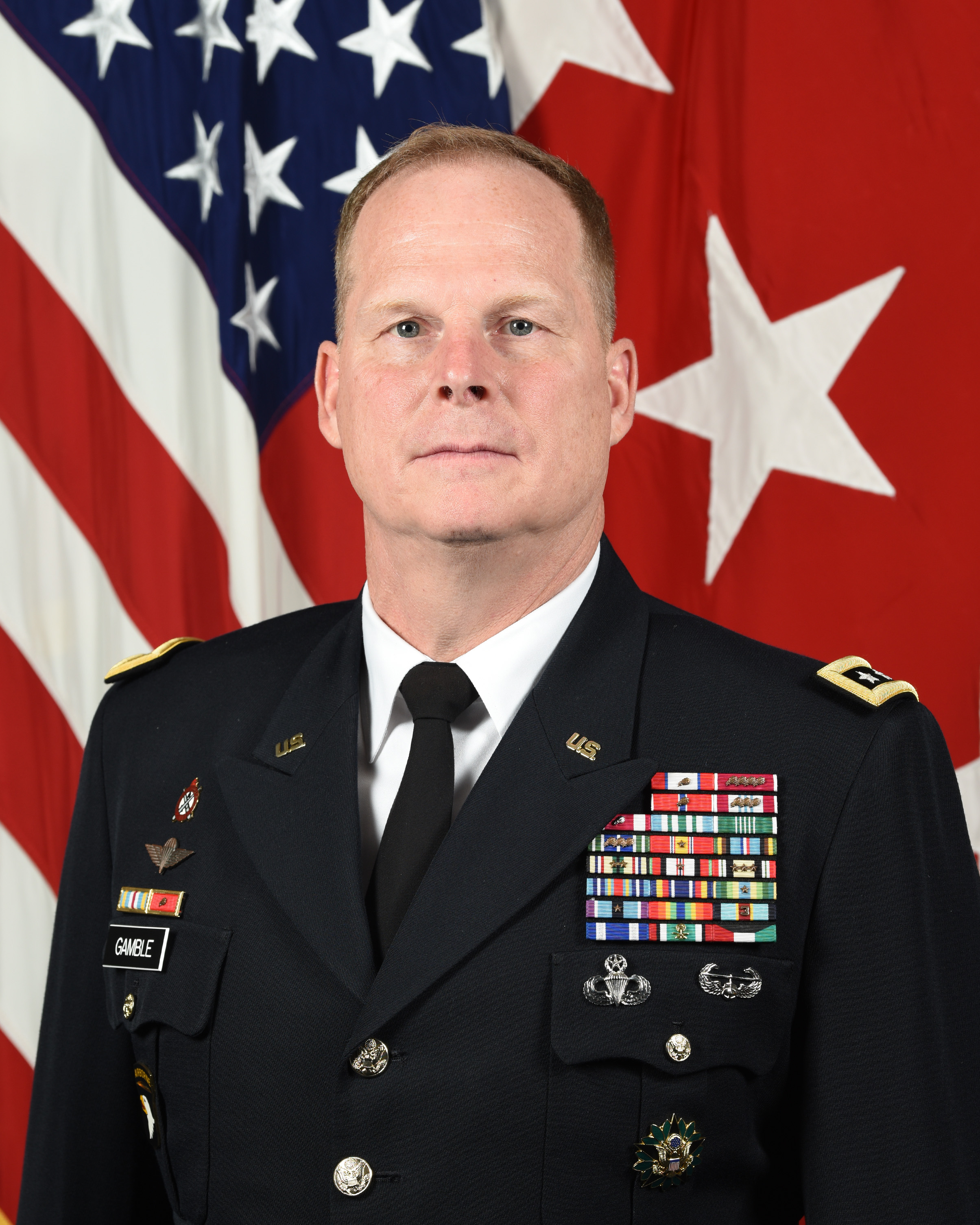
- Gamble as a lieutenant general, 2019
- Born: Arbutus, Maryland, U.S.
- Military career
- Allegiance: United States
- Branch: United States Army
- Service years: 1985–2022
- Rank: Lieutenant General (retired as Major General)
- Commands: United States Army Sustainment Command; 21st Theater Sustainment Command; 528th Sustainment Brigade; 426th Forward Support Battalion
- Conflicts: Gulf War War in Afghanistan; Iraq War
- Awards: Army Distinguished Service Medal (2); Legion of Merit (5); Bronze Star Medal (2)

Duane A. Gamble is a retired United States Army major general who, as a lieutenant general, served as the deputy chief of staff for logistics of the United States Army from September 2019 to April 2022. Previously, he was the commanding general of the United States Army Sustainment Command from July 2017 to August 2019.

== Suspension ==
Gamble was suspended from his position as the deputy chief of staff for logistics on February 16, 2022 “pending the final outcome of a Department of the Army inspector general investigation into allegations of creating or fostering a counterproductive leadership environment”. After the investigation substantiated that Gamble displayed counterproductive leadership on several occasions, he was reassigned as a special assistant to the director of the Army Staff in April 2022. Because his retirement request was not yet approved, he reverted to his permanent rank of major general upon leaving the 3 star G4 position.

Military offices
Preceded by Edward F. Dorman III	Assistant Deputy Chief of Staff for Logistics of the United States Army; 2014–2015	Succeeded by Steven A. Shapiro
Preceded by John R. O'Connor	Commanding General of the 21st Theater Sustainment Command; 2015–2017	Succeeded by Steven A. Shapiro
Preceded by Edward M. Daly	Commanding General of the United States Army Sustainment Command; 2017–2019	Succeeded by Steven A. Shapiro
Preceded by Aundre F. Piggee	Deputy Chief of Staff for Logistics of United States Army; 2019–2022	Succeeded by Charles R. Hamilton
Vacant	Special Assistant to the Director of the Army Staff; 2022	Vacant
