= Stephen E. Farmen =

United States Army general

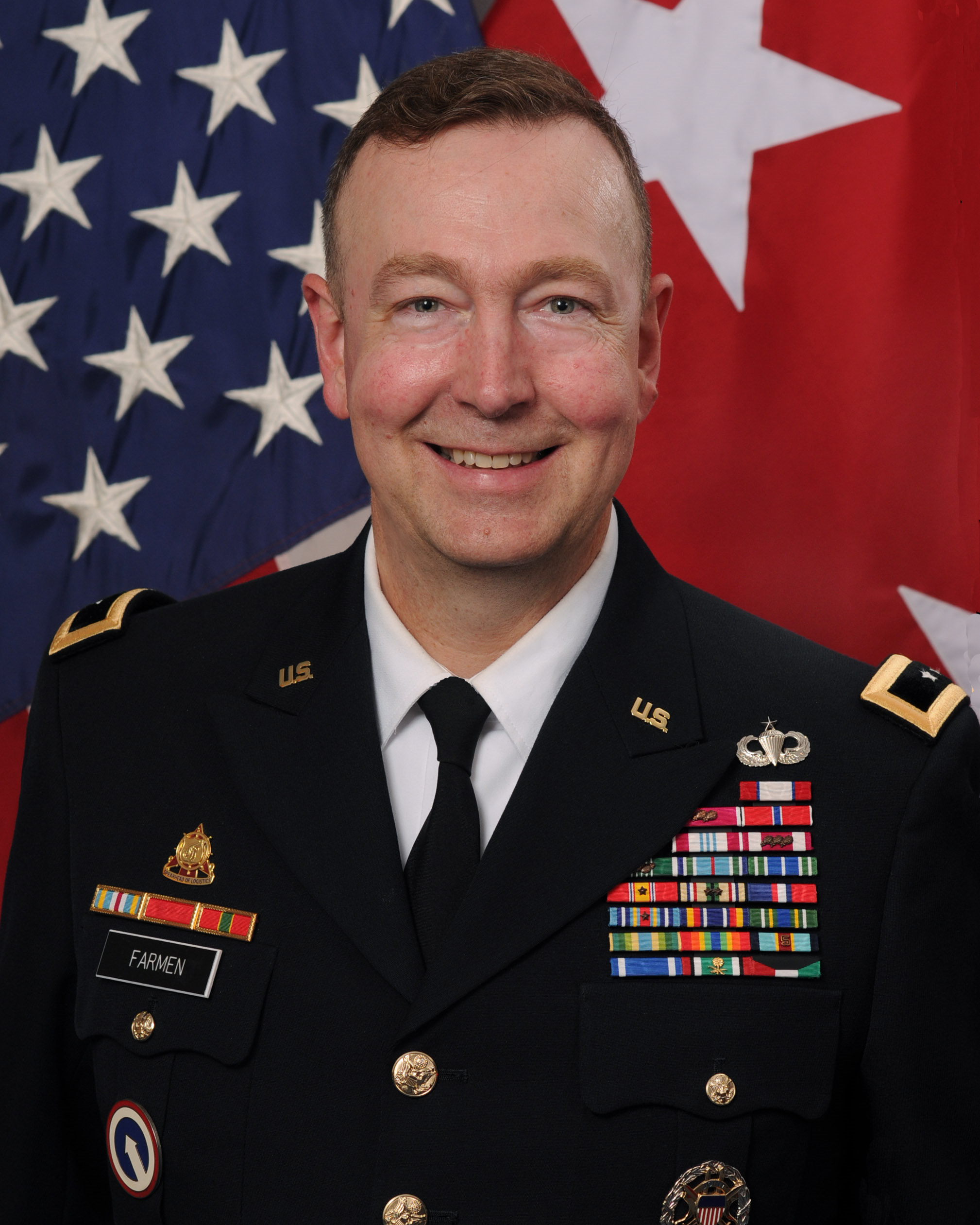
- Major General Stephen E. Farmen
- Military career
- Allegiance: United States of America
- Branch: United States Army
- Service years: 1986–2020
- Rank: Major General
- Commands: Military Surface Deployment and Distribution Command (SDDC); United States Army Security Assistance Command (USASAC); Joint Munitions and Lethality Life-Cycle Management Command and Joint Munitions Command; 19th Sustainment Command (Expeditionary); 26th Chief of Transportation
- Awards: Army Distinguished Service Medal (2)

Major General Stephen E. Farmen was the 21st Commanding General of the U.S. Army Military Surface Deployment and Distribution Command (SDDC), the Army Service Component Command to the U.S. Transportation Command and a Major Subordinate Command to U.S. Army Materiel Command. SDDC provides deployment and distribution capabilities to meet national objectives.

== Military education ==
MG Farmen graduated from the University of Richmond, Richmond, VA, in 1986 with a Bachelor of Arts Degree in History and was commissioned into the Transportation Corps. He received a master's degree in National Security and Strategic Studies from the Naval War College in 2001. His research paper was entitled Network Centric (NETCENTRIC) Warfare (NCW): A Logistics Centric (LOGCENTRIC) Perspective. His military education includes the Transportation Basic and Advanced Courses and the United States Naval Command and Staff College. He completed a Senior Service College Fellowship as the first military fellow at the Massachusetts Institute of Technology's Center for Transportation and Logistics. In addition, he attended the Joint Forces Staff College in Norfolk, VA.

== Military career ==
General Farmen's other command positions include: Commanding General, United States Army Security Assistance Command (USASAC), Redstone Arsenal, AL; Commanding General, Joint Munitions and Lethality Life-Cycle Management Command and Joint Munitions Command; in conjunction with that assignment he also served as Deputy Commanding General, United States Army Sustainment Command; Commanding General, 19th Sustainment Command (Expeditionary), Republic of Korea; 26th Chief of Transportation, Commandant, Transportation School, Fort Lee, VA; Commander, 598th Transportation Brigade (SDDC), Rotterdam, the Netherlands (EUCOM/AFRICOM); Military Surface Deployment and Distribution Command, United States Transportation Command; Deputy Commander, 29th Support Group, 21st Theater Support Command, United States Army Europe and Seventh Army, Germany; Commander, 28th Transportation Battalion, 37th Transportation Command, 21st Theater Support Command, United States Army Europe and Seventh Army, Germany; and Logistics Task Force 28 in Operation Iraqi Freedom (2005–2007); Commander, D Company, 782d Main Support Battalion, 82d Airborne Division, Fort Bragg, NC; Commander, D Company, 407th Supply and Transportation Battalion, 82d Airborne Division, Fort Bragg, NC.

Other assignments include Executive Officer to the Department of the Army G-4, Washington, DC; Joint Staff Logistics Officer, later Executive Assistant to the Director for Logistics, J-4, The Joint Staff, Pentagon, Washington, DC; Battalion S-3, later Executive Officer, 28th Transportation Battalion, 37th Transportation Command, 21st Theater Support Command, United States Army Europe and Seventh Army, Germany (Operations Joint Guard, Allied Force); Chief, Movements and Deployment Branch, and later Executive Officer to the Deputy Chief of Staff, Logistics, United States Army Europe and Seventh Army, Germany; Battalion S-2/3, 782d Main Support Battalion, 82d Airborne Division, Fort Bragg, NC (Operation Uphold Democracy); Logistics Operations (Transportation), 7th Transportation Battalion, 1st COSCOM (Operation Desert Storm); Battalion S1, 99th Forward Support Battalion, 9th Infantry Division (Motorized), Fort Lewis, WA; Platoon Leader, 497th Transportation Company, 80th Ordnance Battalion, 593d Area Support Group, Fort Lewis, WA.

== Awards and decorations ==
MG Farmen's awards and decorations include the Army Distinguished Service Medal (with Oak Leaf Cluster), Legion of Merit (with two Oak Leaf Clusters), the Bronze Star Medal, Defense Meritorious Service Medal, Meritorious Service Medal (with three Oak Leaf Clusters), Army Commendation Medal (with two Oak Leaf Clusters), Joint Service Achievement Medal, Army Achievement Medal, Joint Meritorious Unit Award, Meritorious Unit Citation, Army Superior Unit Award, Senior Parachutist Badge, and the Joint Chiefs of Staff Identification Badge.
