= Gavin Lawrence =

U.S. Army general officer

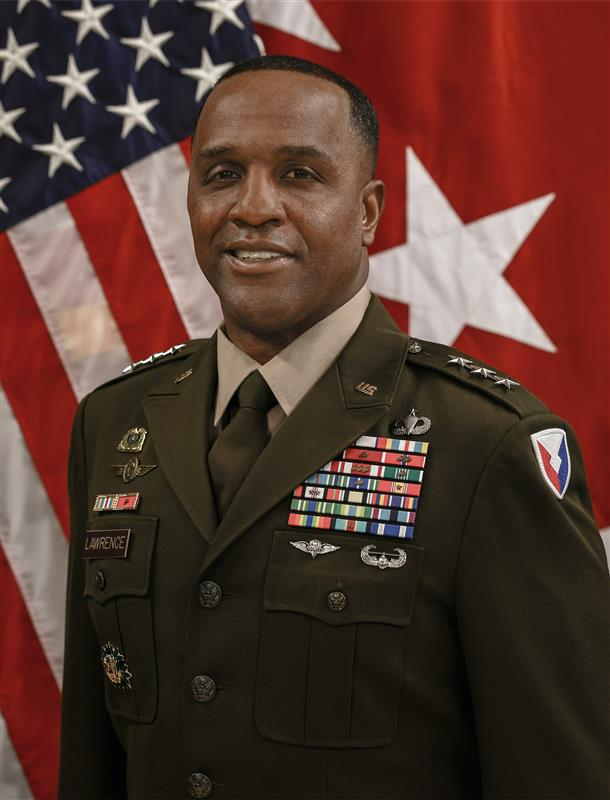
- Official portrait, 2025
- Born: c. 1973 (age 52–53); Roslyn, Pennsylvania, U.S.
- Military career
- Allegiance: United States
- Branch: United States Army
- Service years: 1995–present
- Rank: Lieutenant General
- Commands: Military Surface Deployment and Distribution Command; Defense Logistics Agency Troop Support; 25th Sustainment Brigade, 25th ID; 801st BSB, 4th BCT, 101st Airborne Division (AASLT)
- Awards: Defense Superior Service Medal; Legion of Merit (2); Bronze Star Medal (3)

Gavin A. Lawrence (born c. 1973) is a United States Army lieutenant general. As of November 2025, he serves as the deputy commanding general of the United States Army Materiel Command in Redstone Arsenal, Alabama, and is dual-hatted as the senior commander of Redstone Arsenal.

== Early life and education ==
Lawrence graduated from Bishop McDevitt High School in Wyncote, Pennsylvania, in 1991. He then attended the United States Military Academy (USMA) at West Point, graduating in 1995 with a Bachelor of Science degree in international relations and commission as a second lieutenant in the U.S. Army Quartermaster Corps. His advanced education includes a Master of Arts in national security and strategic studies from the U.S. Naval War College and a Master of Arts in strategic studies from the U.S. Army War College.

== Military career ==
In June 2019, Lawrence began serving as the Commander, Defense Logistics Agency Troop Support, Defense Logistics Agency, Philadelphia, Pennsylvania. On 2 February 2020, he received the rank of Brigadier General.

In May 2021, he was reappointed as the Deputy Chief of Staff, G-4, United States Army Forces Command, Fort Bragg, North Carolina.

On 20 July 2022, he was appointed as the commanding general of the Military Surface Deployment and Distribution Command. On 1 August 2022, Lawrence was promoted to Major General.

In July 2024, Lawrence was nominated for promotion to lieutenant general, with assignment as deputy commanding general and chief of staff of the United States Army Materiel Command. In August 2024, Lawrence was appointed to be the Deputy Chief of Staff for Logistics and Operations, United States Army Materiel Command, Redstone Arsenal, Alabama.

In November 2025, Lawrence began serving as Deputy Commanding General and Chief of Staff, United States Army Materiel Command, Redstone Arsenal, Alabama. On 20 November 2025, Lawrence was promoted to Lieutenant General. Also on 20 November, he began serving solely as the Deputy Commanding General, United States Army Materiel Command. Lawrence is dual-hatted as the Senior Commander of Redstone Arsenal, Alabama.

Military offices
Preceded by Mark Simerly	Commander of Defense Logistics Agency Troop Support; 2019–2021	Succeeded by Eric P. Shirley
Preceded by Kurt J. Ryan	Deputy Chief of Staff for Logistics of the United States Army Forces Command; 2021–2022	Succeeded by Lance G. Curtis
Preceded by Heidi J. Hoyle	Commanding General of the Military Surface Deployment and Distribution Command; 2022–2024	Succeeded by Lance G. Curtis
Preceded by Darren L. Werner	Deputy Chief of Staff for Logistics and Operations of the United States Army Materiel Command; 2024–2025	Vacant
