= United States Army Sustainment Command =

U.S. Army's primary provider of logistics support

Army Sustainment Command
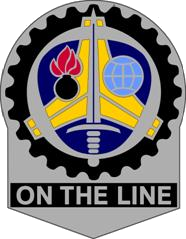
- ASC's distinctive unit insignia
- Active: 22 September 2006 – present
- Country: United States
- Branch: United States Army
- Type: Army Command
- Role: Logistics support
- Part of: U.S. Army Materiel Command
- Garrison/HQ: Rock Island Arsenal
- Motto: "On the line"
- Website: www.aschq.army.mil

Commanders
- Current commander: MG Eric P. Shirley

The United States Army Sustainment Command (ASC) is the primary provider of logistics support to units of the United States Army. It is a major subordinate command of United States Army Materiel Command (AMC). ASC is headquartered at Rock Island Arsenal in Illinois.

== History ==
On Wednesday, June 10 2026 at the Rock Island Arsenal, a ceremony was held of the Joint Munitions Command colors casing as they become part of United States Army Sustainment Command. The ceremony also served as a farewell for Brig. Gen. Daniel Duncan who departed the installation for a position with Army Materiel Command at Redstone Arsenal, Alabama.

== Organization ==
- Army Sustainment Command, at Rock Island Arsenal (IL)
  - 401st Army Field Support Brigade, at Camp Arifjan (Kuwait)
    - Army Field Support Battalion-Kuwait, at Camp Arifjan (Kuwait)
    - Army Field Support Battalion-Southwest Asia, at Camp Arifjan (Kuwait)
  - 402nd Army Field Support Brigade, at Fort Shafter (HI)
    - Army Field Support Battalion-Alaska, at Fort Wainwright and Joint Base Elmendorf–Richardson (AK)
    - Army Field Support Battalion-Hawaii, at Schofield Barracks (HI)
  - 403rd Army Field Support Brigade, at Camp Henry (South Korea)
    - Army Field Support Battalion-Korea, at Camp Humphreys (South Korea)
    - Army Field Support Battalion-Northeast Asia, at Camp Carroll (South Korea)
  - 404th Army Field Support Brigade, at Joint Base Lewis–McChord (WA)
    - Army Field Support Battalion-Charleston, at Joint Base Charleston (SC)
    - Army Field Support Battalion-Lewis, at Joint Base Lewis–McChord (WA)
  - 405th Army Field Support Brigade, in Kaiserslautern (Germany)
    - Army Field Support Battalion-Africa, in Livorno (Italy)
    - Army Field Support Battalion-Benelux, in Eygelshoven (Netherlands)
    - Army Field Support Battalion-Germany, in Vilseck (Germany)
    - Army Field Support Battalion-Poland, in Powidz (Poland)
  - 406th Army Field Support Brigade, at Fort Bragg (NC)
    - Army Field Support Battalion-Bragg, at Fort Bragg (NC)
    - Army Field Support Battalion-Campbell, at Fort Campbell (KY)
    - Army Field Support Battalion-Drum, at Fort Drum (NY)
    - Army Field Support Battalion-Stewart, at Fort Stewart (GA)
  - 407th Army Field Support Brigade, at Fort Hood (TX)
    - Army Field Support Battalion-Bliss, at Fort Bliss (TX)
    - Army Field Support Battalion-Carson, at Fort Carson (CO)
    - Army Field Support Battalion-Hood, at Fort Hood (TX)
    - Army Field Support Battalion-Riley, at Fort Riley (KS)
  - 279th Army Field Support Brigade (Alabama Army National Guard)
  - Logistics Civil Augmentation Program (LOGCAP) Support Brigade, at Rock Island Arsenal (IL)
    - 1st LOGCAP Support Battalion, at Fort Belvoir (VA)
    - 2nd LOGCAP Support Battalion, at Rock Island Arsenal (IL)
    - 3rd LOGCAP Support Battalion, in Birmingham (AL)
    - 4th LOGCAP Support Battalion, in Athens (GA)
    - 5th LOGCAP Support Battalion, in Sheffield (AL)
  - Army Sustainment Command – Army Reserve Element (ASC-ARE), at Rock Island Arsenal (IL) (United States Army Reserve)
    - Detachments at Fort Bragg (NC), Fort Hood (TX), and Joint Base Lewis–McChord (WA)
  - U.S. Army Chemical Materials Activity

== Tactical units ==
- 408th Contracting Support Brigade (Kuwait)
- 409th Contracting Support Brigade (Germany)
- 410th Contracting Support Brigade (Texas)
- 411th Contracting Support Brigade (Korea)
- 413th Contracting Support Brigade (Hawaii)
- 414th Contracting Support Brigade (Africa & Italy)
- LRC-RIA (Logistics readiness center – Rock Island Arsenal)

== Ammunition locations ==
ASC operates a nationwide network of installations and facilities where conventional ammunition is produced and stored.

Production and storage

Installation	Location
Crane Army Ammunition Activity	Crane, Indiana
McAlester Army Ammunition Plant	McAlester, Oklahoma

Production

Installation	Location
Holston Army Ammunition Plant	Kingsport, Tennessee
Iowa Army Ammunition Plant	Middletown, Iowa
Lake City Army Ammunition Plant	Independence, Missouri
Pine Bluff Arsenal	Pine Bluff, Arkansas
Radford Army Ammunition Plant	Radford, Virginia
Scranton Army Ammunition Plant	Scranton, Pennsylvania

Storage

Installation	Location
Anniston Munitions Center	Anniston, Alabama
Blue Grass Army Depot	Richmond, Kentucky
Hawthorne Army Depot	Hawthorne, Nevada
Letterkenny Munitions Center	Chambersburg, Pennsylvania
Tooele Army Depot	Tooele, Utah

== Command authority and the Army Sustainment Command ==
Four types of command authority affect the United States Army's forces (some apply to the Army Sustainment Command):

- Administrative control (ADCON) – a relationship where a unit obtains resources, direction on training, methods of morale and discipline, and other functions from a designated higher headquarters (e.g., the Army Transportation Command—distinct from the Army Sustainment Command—is under the ADCON of the Army Materiel Command.)
- Combatant command (COCOM) – the control over military operations, joint training, and logistics matters of a service branch component to a U.S. Department of Defense unit. The Army Sustainment Command—not designated an Army service component command to a unified combatant command (or other joint unit)—is not affected by COCOM authority. (An example of a unit under COCOM authority is the Army Transportation Command. It is under the ADCON of the Army Materiel Command, while under the COCOM of the U.S. Transportation Command, due to it being assigned as its Army service component command.)
- Operational control (OPCON) – a relationship where a higher headquarters, other than the ADCON-providing headquarters, controls a unit's tasks and upward reporting structure. Typically, operational control is applied to a unit on deployment to a different region, or, on a special mission. In the Army Sustainment Command, the Army field support brigades are assigned to ASC, but are operationally controlled by a theater sustainment command or an expeditionary sustainment command under an Army service component command. (Another example of operational control is when OPCON is held by a unified combatant command over its assigned service branch units. For example, the U.S. Central Command may hold OPCON over the units in I Marine Expeditionary Force on a rotational deployment).
- Tactical control (TACON) – a lower level of OPCON.

The sustainment of an Army installation, such as Fort Bliss and White Sands Missile Range, two contiguous but administratively separate military installations, can be tailored to the situation. In the case of geographically remote locations, logistics can be an additional constraint.

== List of commanding generals ==
No.	Commanding General		Term		
No.	Portrait	Name	Took office	Left office	Duration
1	Jerome Johnson	Major General; Jerome Johnson	September 22, 2006	July 31, 2007	312 days
2	Robert M. Radin	Major General; Robert M. Radin	July 31, 2007	September 2, 2009	2 years, 33 days
3	Yves J. Fontaine	Major General; Yves J. Fontaine	September 2, 2009	October 28, 2011	2 years, 56 days
4	Patricia E. McQuistion	Major General; Patricia E. McQuistion	October 28, 2011	September 18, 2012	326 days
5	John F. Wharton	Major General; John F. Wharton (born 1957)	September 18, 2012	August 21, 2014	1 year, 337 days
6	Kevin G. O'Connell	Major General; Kevin G. O'Connell	August 21, 2014	August 11, 2016	1 year, 356 days
7	Edward M. Daly	Major General; Edward M. Daly (born 1965)	August 11, 2016	July 25, 2017	348 days
8	Duane A. Gamble	Major General; Duane A. Gamble	July 25, 2017	August 29, 2019	2 years, 35 days
9	Steven A. Shapiro	Major General; Steven A. Shapiro	August 29, 2019	June 24, 2020	300 days
10	Daniel G. Mitchell	Major General; Daniel G. Mitchell	June 24, 2020	May 27, 2021	337 days
–	Matthew L. Sannito	Matthew L. Sannito; Acting	May 27, 2021	June 15, 2021	19 days
11	Christopher O. Mohan	Major General; Christopher O. Mohan	June 15, 2021	July 19, 2022	1 year, 34 days
12	David Wilson	Major General; David Wilson	July 19, 2022	July 19, 2024	2 years, 0 days
13	John B. Hinson	Brigadier General; John B. Hinson	July 19, 2024	June 12, 2025	328 days
–	Dan J. Reilly	Dan J. Reilly; Acting	June 12, 2025	July 10, 2025	28 days
13	Eric P. Shirley	Major General; Eric P. Shirley	July 10, 2025	Incumbent	1 year, 82 days
