= Supply Corps =

A Supply Corps is a branch of a country's military which is in charge of logistics and supply procurement to the armed forces. The term is also used by private corporations but on a much rarer basis.

In the United States armed forces, each branch of service has its own supply corps. The United States Army refers to the organization as the Quartermaster Corps while the U.S. Navy operates a group known as the Navy Supply Corps.

In most militaries, the Supply Corps are considered staff officers meaning that they have no command authority over troops in the field or ships at sea. In the modern age, however, some logistics commands (such as Commander Naval Logistics Forces Korea) have such a forward deployed manpower base that they are considered equal to front line combat units. The supply corps are responsible for supply logistics for combat and non-combat missions. e.g., securing supplies, materials and equipment required by for combat units.

== History ==
The U.S. Navy Supply Corps was established by an act of congress in 1795 for the purpose of procuring supplies for military operations.
