= Jack K. Gamble =

United States Air Force general

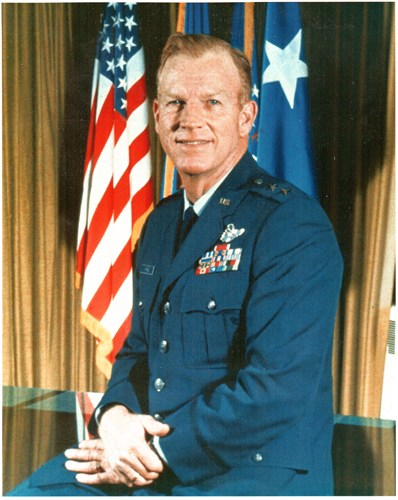
- Born: July 27, 1922; Belleville, Illinois
- Died: March 12, 2011 (aged 88); Tacoma, Washington
- Military career
- Allegiance: United States of America
- Branch: United States Air Force
- Service years: 1942–1974
- Rank: Major General
- Commands: Alaskan Air Command
- Awards: Legion of Merit, Distinguished Flying Cross, Air Medal with two oak leaf clusters, Air Force Commendation Medal, Presidential Unit Citation Emblem, and Air Force Outstanding Unit Award Ribbon

Jack Kenneth Gamble (July 27, 1922 – March 12, 2011) was an American Air Force major general who was commander of the Alaskan Air Command with headquarters at Elmendorf Air Force Base, Alaska. The command has the mission of providing early attack warning for the United States and Canada, air defense of Alaska, and aerial support for U.S. Army forces based in Alaska.

== Biography ==
Gamble was born in 1922, at Belleville, Illinois. He attended the University of Utah and the University of Maryland, and is a graduate of the Air Command and Staff School, 1956, and the Industrial College of the Armed Forces, 1964.

He enlisted in the Army Air Corps in April 1942, entered the aviation cadet program and graduated in March 1943 at Williams Field, Arizona, with a commission as second lieutenant and his pilot wings. He then entered Night Fighter Combat Crew Training School, Orlando, Florida, where he flew the P-70 aircraft.

In July 1943 he was assigned to the 414th Night Fighter Squadron in the European Theater of Operations. Flying the Bristol Beaufighter, Gamble completed 93 combat missions over North Africa, Sardinia, Corsica, Southern France and Northern Italy, accumulating 277 flying combat hours.

In December 1944 he returned to the United States to become a P-61 pilot instructor at Hammer Field, Fresno, California. In March 1946 he went to Germany where he spent three years flying the RF-51, P-61, and P-47 aircraft.

From March 1949 to July 1953, Gamble served in the Directorate of Plans, Headquarters U.S. Air Force. In December 1953 he was transferred to Malmstrom Air Force Base, Montana, and assumed command of the 29th Fighter Interceptor Squadron, where he flew the F-94C. In November 1954 he became director of combat operations for the 29th Air Division.

In July 1955 he entered the Air Command and Staff School at Maxwell Air Force Base, Alabama. Following graduation in June 1956, Gamble began an exchange tour of duty with the Royal Canadian Air Force Headquarters at Ottawa as chief of the Day Fighter Branch.

He was assigned in June 1958 as staff planning officer with the 37th Air Division and later was assistant director of operations and training for the 30th Air Division at Truax Field, Wisconsin. In November 1960 he became commander of the 319th Fighter Interceptor Squadron at Bunker Hill Air Force Base, Indiana, where he flew the F-106 Delta Dart.

Gamble was next assigned to the 25th Air Division headquarters at McChord Air Force Base, Washington, where he served as deputy chief of staff, Civil Engineering, from July 1961 to June 1963. He then became a student at the Industrial College of the Armed Forces, Fort McNair, Washington, D.C.

In July 1964 he was again transferred to Germany, this time to the 86th Air Division at Ramstein Air Base. As director of operations, he flew the F-102 Delta Dagger until his return to the United States in July 1967.

Gamble next attended the Air Defense Command Life Support Training Course and the F-101 Combat Crew Training School at Tyndall Air Force Base, Florida. Following this training, he assumed command of the 52d Fighter Wing at Suffolk County Air Force Base, New York. He assumed command of the 35th Air Division with headquarters at Hancock Field, New York, in April 1969.

In November 1969 Gamble assumed command of the 20th North American Air Defense Command/Continental Air Defense Command Region with headquarters at Fort Lee Air Force Station, Fort Lee, Virginia, and had additional duties as commander, 20th Air Division.

Gamble became commander of the 25th North American Air Defense Command/Continental Air Defense Command Region with headquarters at McChord Air Force Base, Washington, in March 1972, with additional duties as commander, 25th Air Division. He was assigned as commander of the Alaskan Air Command with headquarters at Elmendorf Air Force Base, Alaska, in March 1974.

His military decorations and awards include the Legion of Merit, Distinguished Flying Cross, Air Medal with two oak leaf clusters, Air Force Commendation Medal, Presidential Unit Citation Emblem, and Air Force Outstanding Unit Award Ribbon.

He was promoted to the grade of major general effective September 1, 1971, with date of rank November 8, 1967. A command pilot, Gamble retired September 1, 1974.
