= Steven A. Shapiro =

American military officer

Steven A. Shapiro is a retired U.S. Army general officer who specializes in logistics and sustainment. Major General Shapiro was commanding general of the United States Army Sustainment Command from 2019 to 2020. Prior to that, he was the commanding general of the 21st Theater Sustainment Command in Germany, with responsibility for military sustainment throughout the European and African theaters.

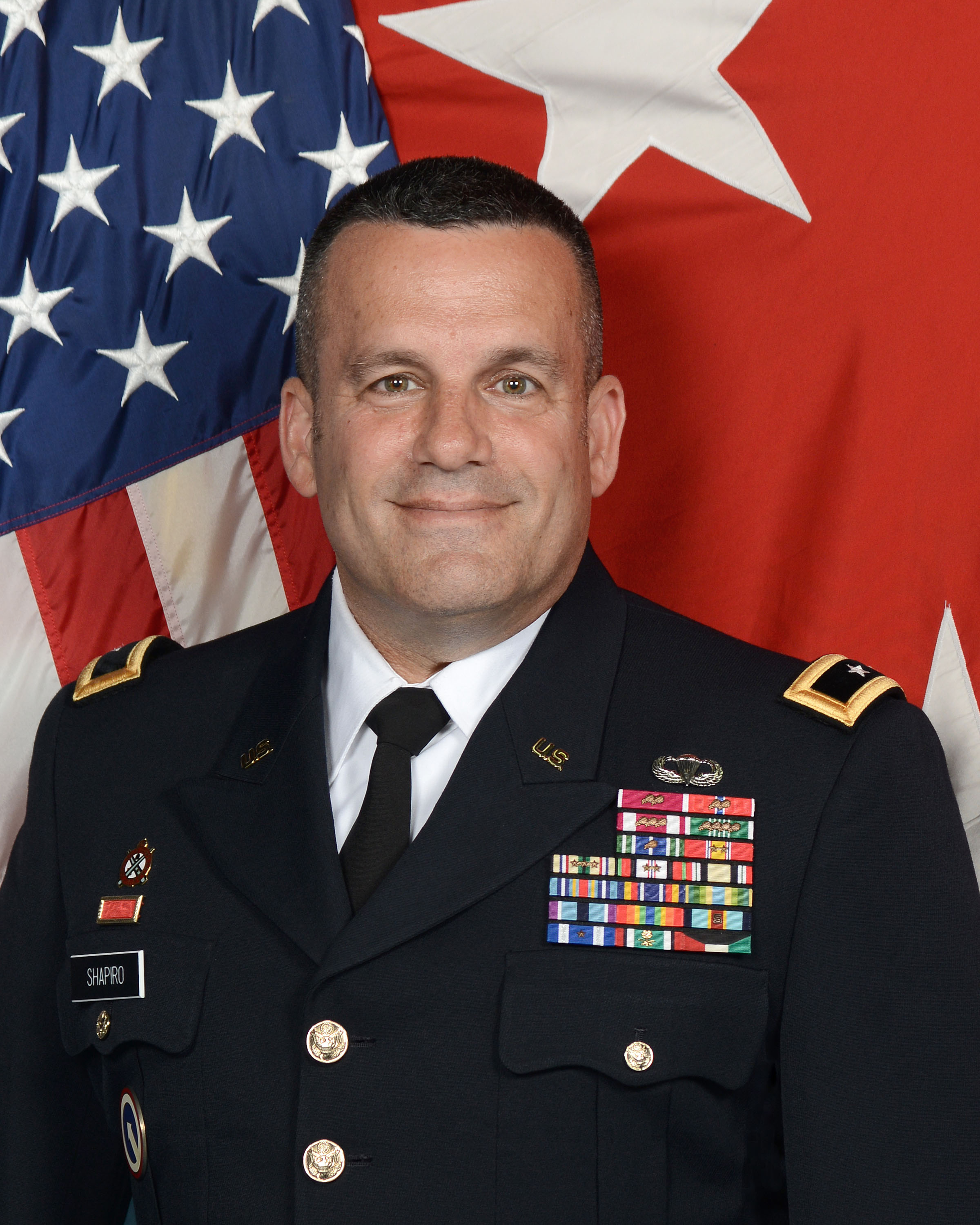

== Education ==
Shapiro received a bachelor's degree from George Washington University in 1985, a master's degree from Florida Institute of Technology in 1994, and a second master's degree from the Army War College.

== Career ==
In August 2007, Shapiro took command of Letterkenny Army Depot in Franklin County, Pennsylvania. While he was base commander, construction of a new reserve center was added, providing "real-world" training opportunities for the soldiers. While he was base commander, Letterkenny Army Depot won its fourth Shingo Prize for manufacturing.

== Awards and decorations ==
His awards and badges include:

- Distinguished Service Medal
- Defense Superior Service Medal
- Legion of Merit (with three Oak Leaf Clusters)
- Bronze Star Medal (with two Oak Leaf Clusters)
- Defense Meritorious Service Medal
- Meritorious Service Medal (with three Oak Leaf Clusters)
- Army Commendation Medal (with four Oak Leaf Clusters)
- Army Achievement Medal (with one Oak Leaf Cluster)
- Parachutist Badge
