= United States Army Materiel Command =

U.S. Army's primary provider of materiel

U.S. Army Materiel Command
- AMC shoulder sleeve insignia
- Active: 1962–present
- Country: United States
- Branch: United States Army
- Role: Develops, maintains, and supports materiel capabilities for the Army
- Size: More than 60,000 military and civilians
- Part of: United States Department of the Army
- Garrison/HQ: Redstone Arsenal, Alabama
- Mottos: If a Soldier shoots it, drives it, flies it, wears it, communicates with it, or eats it – AMC provides it.
- March: Arsenal for the Brave
- Website: AMC website army.mil Profile

Commanders
- Current commander: LTG Christopher Mohan
- Deputy Commanding General: LTG Gavin A. Lawrence
- Command Sergeant Major: CSM Jacinto Garza
- Notable commanders: Frank S. Besson, Jr. Ferdinand J. Chesarek

Insignia
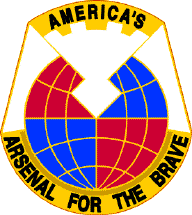
- Distinctive unit insignia

The United States Army Materiel Command (AMC) is the primary provider of materiel to the United States Army via its contracting support brigades.

AMC operates depots; arsenals; ammunition plants; and other facilities, and maintains the Army's prepositioned stocks, both on land and afloat. The command is also the Department of Defense Executive Agent for conventional ammunition and the U.S. chemical weapons stockpile.

AMC is responsible for the business of selling United States Army equipment and services to allies of the United States and negotiates and implements agreements for co-production of U.S. weapons systems by other states.

== History ==
AMC was established on 8 May 1962, and was activated on 1 August of that year as a major field command of the U.S. Army. Prior to its creation, Lt. Gen. Frank S. Besson, Jr. directed a Department of the Army study to be conducted, of which recommended the creation of a "materiel development and logistics command". He would serve as the AMC's first commander.

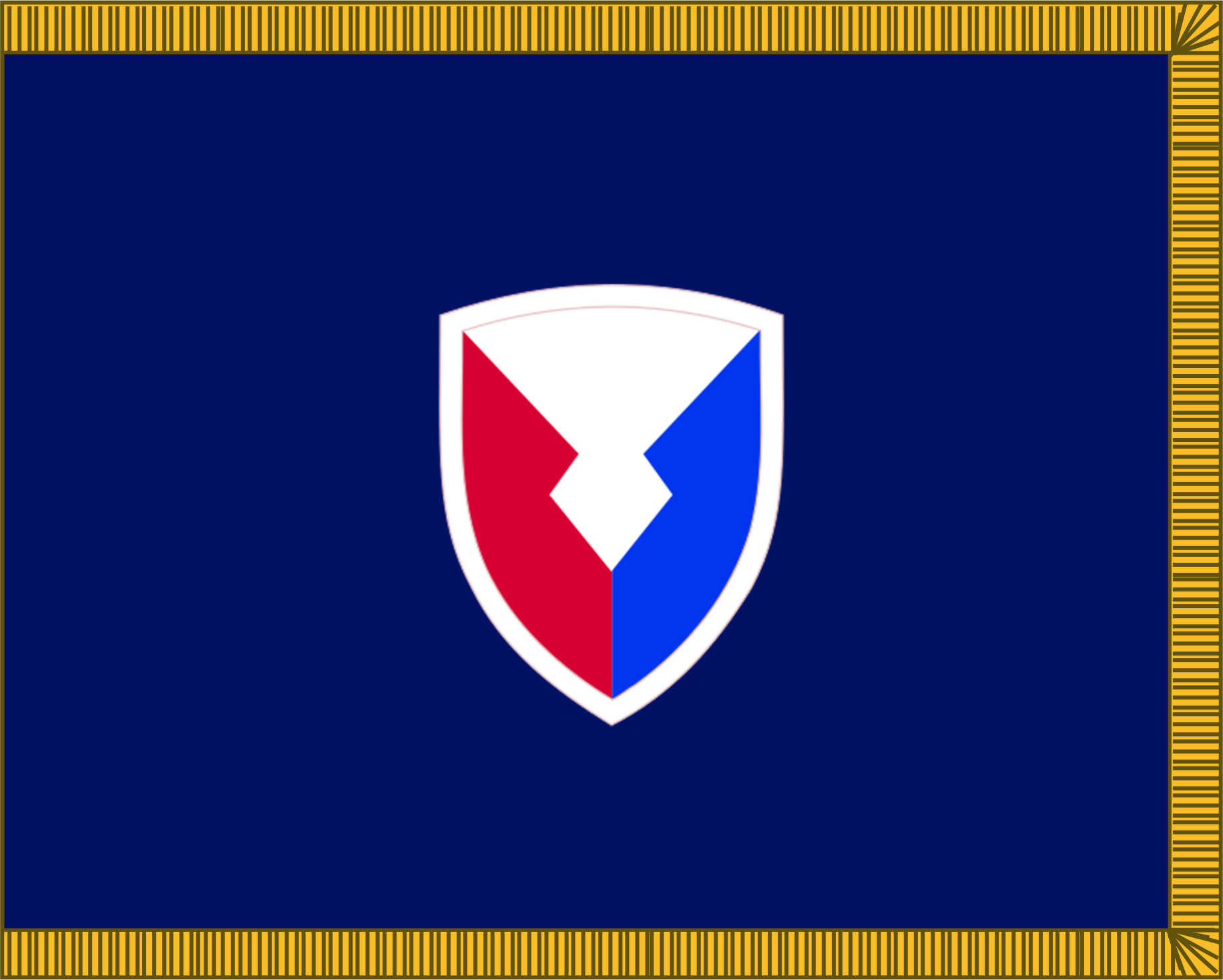
United States Army Materiel Command Flag

As part of the formation of AMC, various field activities and installations were transferred into it. Most of those field activities and installations came from six of the technical services, including: the Chief Chemical Officer, Chief of Engineers, Chief of Ordnance (the single largest source of AMC installations), the Quartermaster General, Chief Signal Officer, and the Chief of Transportation. The seventh technical service, the Surgeon General, provided one medical depot. Several other installations and activities came from Headquarters, Department of the Army (HQDA) Deputy Chief of Staff for Logistics, the Continental Army Command (CONARC), and the Chief of Research and Development.

Since its creation in 1962, AMC underwent constant reorganizations in its headquarters and field commands. These conditions reflected a more fundamental problem, chronic dissatisfaction with the Army’s entire system for developing and fielding new weapons and equipment. A special Army Materiel Acquisition Review Committee, on 1 April 1974 recommended sweeping organizational and management reforms.

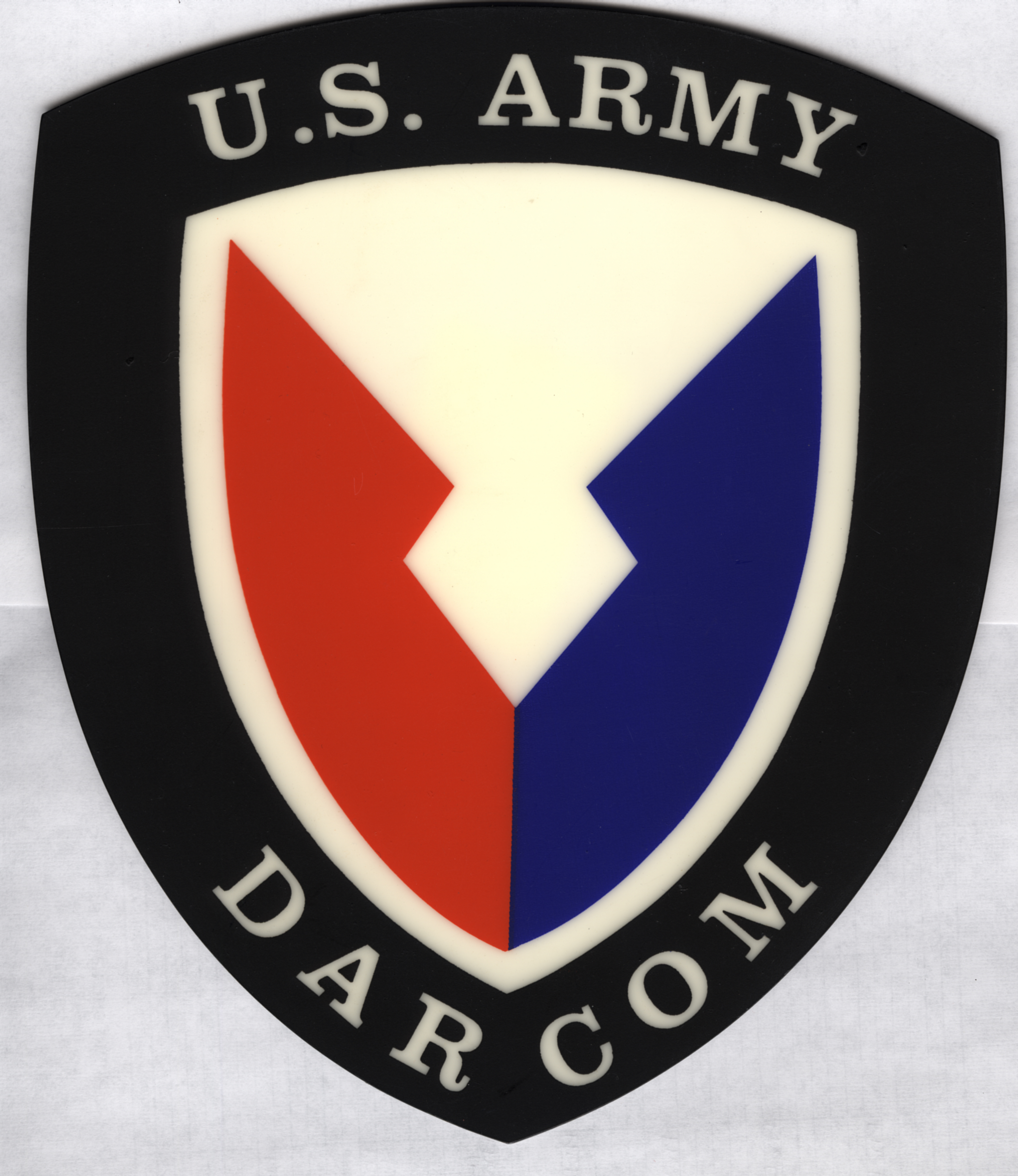
Materiel Development and Readiness Command emblem, 1976–84

On 23 January 1976, AMC was renamed to U.S. Army Materiel Development and Readiness Command (DARCOM). DARCOM commander Gen. John R. Deane Jr. best summed up the renaming's purpose, which was "to emphasize that readiness is a part of our business."

Both "materiel development" and "materiel readiness" represented two major organizational elements within the command. The former, materiel development, was responsible for research and development, producer tests and evaluation, and initial procurement of weapons and equipment. The latter, materiel readiness, was responsible for buying, fielding, and maintaining those systems.

As part of this reorganization, commands managed by AMC were broken into individual commands for research and development, and for readiness. Accordingly, during fiscal year 1976 the Tank-Automotive Command (TACOM) became the Tank-Automotive Research and Development Command and the Tank-Automotive Materiel Readiness Command. The Missile and the Armaments Commands were similarly divided.

Effective 1 August 1984, DARCOM was renamed back to AMC. The reason for the change was to "remove a perceived boundary between development and logistics support implied in the DARCOM name". Additionally, it was said that the conciseness and clarity of the name AMC "[would] be better understood by allies and the general public."

In December 2024, Army secretary Christine Wormuth, "in a dramatic and rare move", dismissed General Charles R. Hamilton, the AMC commanding general, following an Army investigation that concluded he had improperly intervened to arrange a battalion command position for a female lieutenant colonel he favored.

== Locations ==
AMC is currently headquartered at Redstone Arsenal in Huntsville, Alabama, and has operations in approximately 149 locations worldwide including more than 49 American states and 50 countries.

AMC employs upwards of 70,000 military and civilian employees.

From 1973 to 2003, AMC was headquartered in Alexandria, Virginia, and prior to 1973, it was headquartered at what is now Reagan National Airport. AMC was located at Fort Belvoir, Virginia, between 2003 and 2005 before being relocated to Alabama by the 2005 Base Realignment and Closure Commission.

== List of commanding generals ==
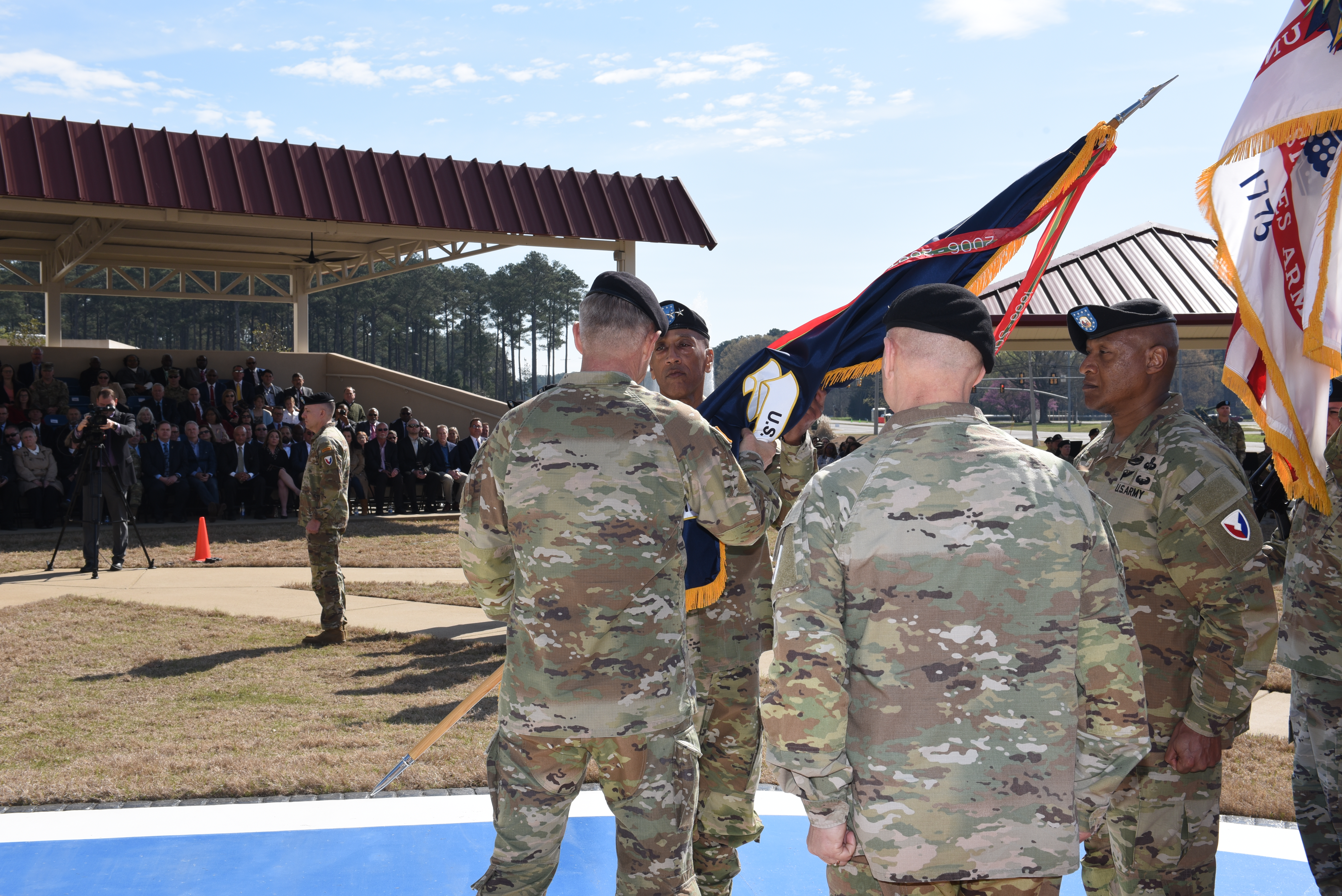
Gen. Charles R. Hamilton assumes command of AMC from Gen. Edward M. Daly on 16 March 2023.

No.	Commanding General		Term		
No.	Portrait	Name	Took office	Left office	Term length
As U.S. Army Materiel Command
1	Frank S. Besson Jr.	General; Frank S. Besson Jr.	2 April 1962	10 March 1969	6 years, 342 days
2	Ferdinand J. Chesarek	General; Ferdinand J. Chesarek	10 March 1969	1 November 1970	1 year, 236 days
3	Henry A. Miley Jr.	General; Henry A. Miley Jr.	1 November 1970	12 February 1975	4 years, 103 days
As U.S. Army Materiel Development and Readiness Command
4	John R. Deane Jr.	General; John R. Deane Jr.	12 February 1975	1 February 1977	1 year, 355 days
5	George Sammet Jr.	Lieutenant General; George Sammet Jr.	1 February 1977	1 May 1977	89 days
6	John R. Guthrie	General; John R. Guthrie	1 May 1977	1 August 1981	4 years, 92 days
7	Donald R. Keith	General; Donald R. Keith	1 August 1981	29 June 1984	2 years, 333 days
As U.S. Army Materiel Command
8	Richard H. Thompson	General; Richard H. Thompson	29 June 1984	13 April 1987	2 years, 288 days
9	Louis C. Wagner Jr.	General; Louis C. Wagner Jr.	13 April 1987	27 September 1989	2 years, 167 days
10	William G.T. Tuttle Jr.	General; William G.T. Tuttle Jr.	27 September 1989	31 January 1992	2 years, 126 days
11	Jimmy D. Ross	General; Jimmy D. Ross	31 January 1992	11 February 1994	2 years, 11 days
12	Leon E. Salomon	General; Leon E. Salomon	11 February 1994	27 March 1996	2 years, 45 days
13	Johnnie E. Wilson	General; Johnnie E. Wilson	27 March 1996	14 May 1999	3 years, 48 days
14	John G. Coburn	General; John G. Coburn	14 May 1999	30 October 2001	2 years, 169 days
15	Paul J. Kern	General; Paul J. Kern	30 October 2001	5 November 2004	3 years, 6 days
16	Benjamin S. Griffin	General; Benjamin S. Griffin	5 November 2004	14 November 2008	4 years, 9 days
17	Ann E. Dunwoody	General; Ann E. Dunwoody	14 November 2008	28 June 2012	3 years, 227 days
18	Dennis L. Via	General; Dennis L. Via	28 June 2012	30 September 2016	4 years, 94 days
19	Gustave F. Perna	General; Gustave F. Perna	30 September 2016	2 July 2020	3 years, 276 days
20	Edward M. Daly	General; Edward M. Daly	2 July 2020	16 March 2023	2 years, 257 days
21	Charles R. Hamilton	General; Charles R. Hamilton	16 March 2023	22 March 2024	1 year, 6 days
-	Christopher Mohan	Lieutenant General; Christopher Mohan; Acting	22 March 2024	20 November 2025	1 year, 243 days
22	Christopher Mohan	Lieutenant General; Christopher Mohan	20 November 2025	07 August 2026	260 days

== Organization ==
The U.S. Army Materiel Command oversees 9 major subordinate commands (MSC).

=== Current ===
==== Major subordinate commands ====
- U.S. Army Aviation and Missile Command
- U.S. Army Communications-Electronics Command
- U.S. Army Contracting Command
- U.S. Army Financial Management Command, a former direct reporting unit to the Department of the Army, was made subordinate to AMC, effective 1 October 2019.
- U.S. Army Installation Management Command, a former direct reporting unit to the Department of the Army, was made subordinate to AMC, effective 1 March 2019.
- U.S. Army Security Assistance Command
- U.S. Army Sustainment Command
- U.S. Army Tank-automotive and Armaments Command
- U.S. Army Transportation Command

=== Former units ===
==== Major subordinate commands ====
- U.S. Army Industrial Operations Command, former structure of Joint Munitions Command, from 1995 to 2000.
- U.S. Army Research, Development and Engineering Command, as designated from 2002 to 2019.
  - U.S. Army Combat Capabilities Development Command – RDECOM redesignation upon transfer to Army Futures Command, effective 3 February 2019.
- U.S. Army Medical Logistics Command, activated in 2019 as an AMC major subordinate command, and in 2020, transferred under the Communications-Electronics Command.
- U.S. Army Joint Munitions Command, transferred under the Army Sustainment Command, from 2003 to 2026.

==== Separate reporting activities ====
- U.S. Army Element, Assembled Chemical Weapons Alternatives, an Army "element", assigned to AMC but reporting to the DoD, was reorganized into a program executive office (PEO) and assigned to USAASC in 2012.
- U.S. Army Logistics Data Analysis Center, established as the Logistics Support Activity in 1993, the activity was a separate reporting activity of AMC. Certain functions of the activity were transferred to Army Sustainment Command in 2018, and the activity was redesignated as the Logistics Data Analysis Center in 2019. Around 2025, the center was merged with the AMC G3 element.

== See also ==
Comparable organizations – Other U.S. Armed Forces systems commands

- Marine Corps Systems Command
- United States Navy systems commands
  - Naval Sea Systems Command
  - Naval Air Systems Command
  - Naval Information Warfare Systems Command
  - Naval Facilities Engineering Systems Command
  - Naval Supply Systems Command
- Air Force Materiel Command
- Space Systems Command
