= Daniel Walrath =

U.S. Army general

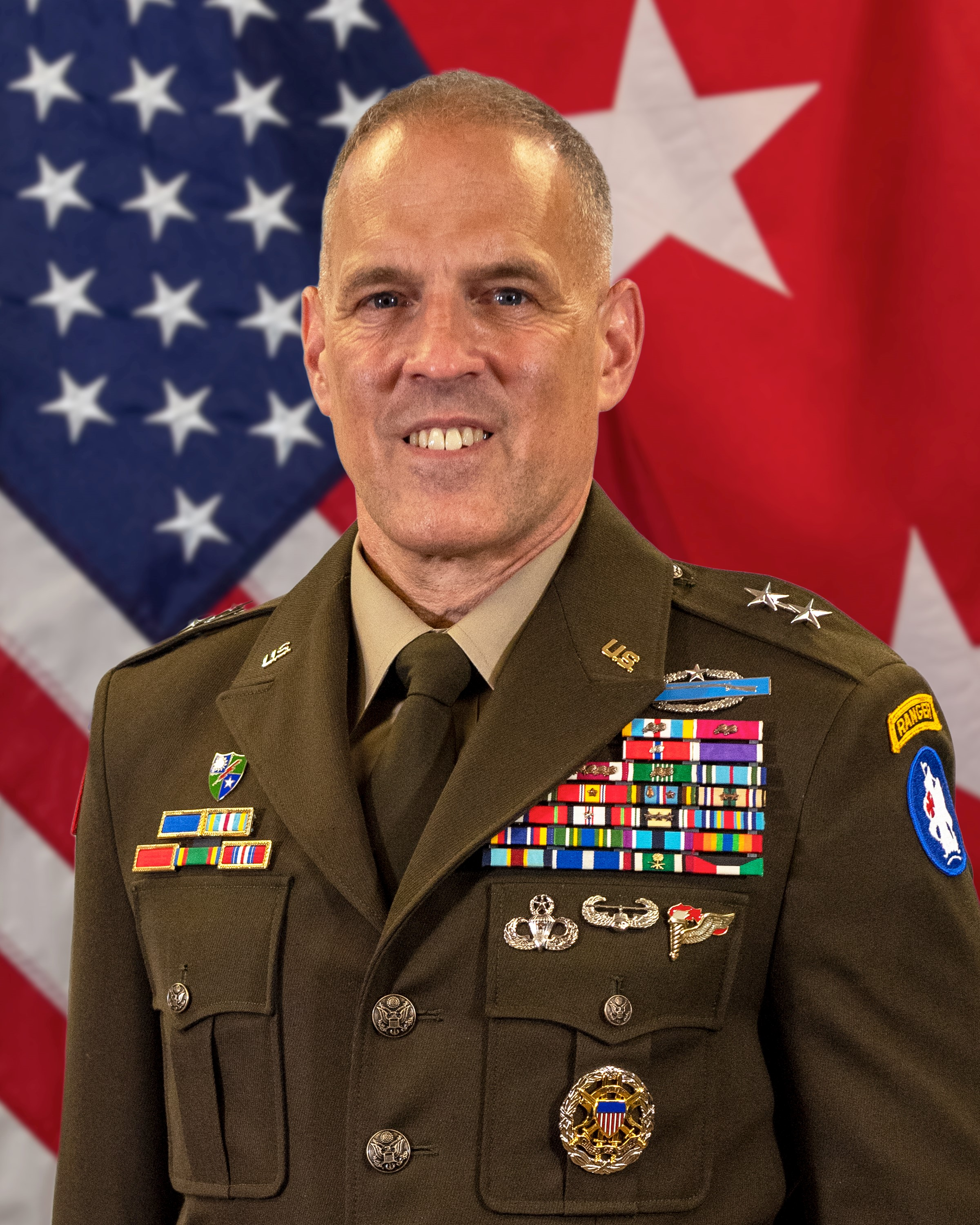
- Official portrait, 2021
- Military career
- Allegiance: United States
- Branch: United States Army
- Rank: Major General
- Commands: United States Army South

Daniel R. Walrath is a retired United States Army major general who last served as the Commanding General of United States Army South from July 16, 2019, to June 30, 2021. Previously, he served as the Deputy Chief of Staff for Strategy and Policy of the Resolute Support Mission and Deputy Commander of United States Forces–Afghanistan.

Military offices
Preceded by John B. Richardson	Deputy Director for Operations (Operations Team Four) of the Joint Staff; 2016–2017	Succeeded by Michael R. Eastman
Preceded by ???	Vice Deputy Director for Nuclear, Homeland Defense and Current Operations of the Joint Staff; 2017–2018	Succeeded by Barry Cornish
Preceded by Mark R. Stammer	Commanding General of United States Army South; 2019–2021	Succeeded by William L. Thigpen
