= Michael Eastman =

U.S. Army general

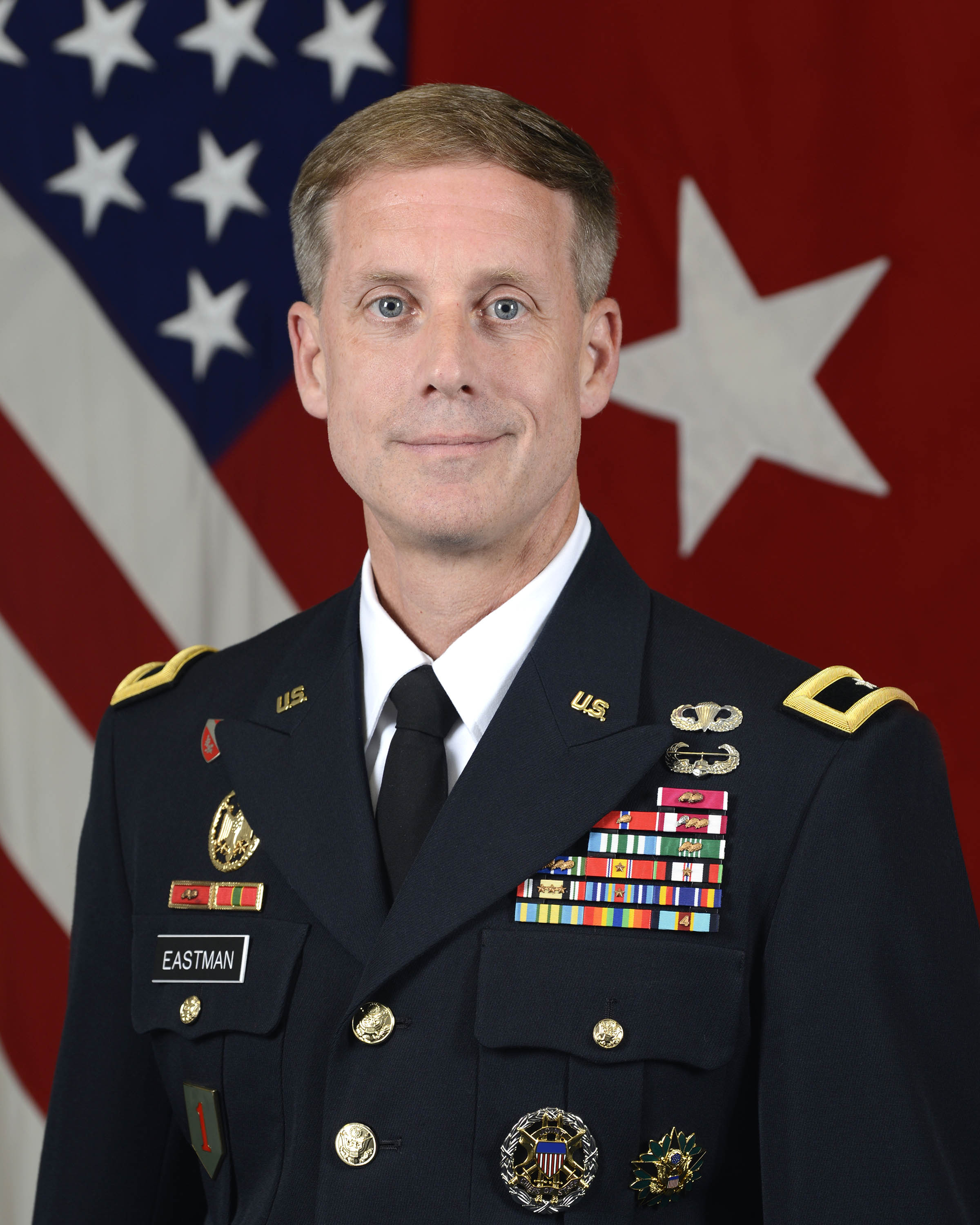
- Official portrait, 2018
- Military career
- Allegiance: United States
- Branch: United States Army
- Service years: 1991–2021
- Rank: Brigadier General
- Commands: Train, Advise, Assist Command - South Deputy CG, 10th Mountain Division 75th Field Artillery Brigade 2 Battalion, 29th Field Artillery
- Conflicts: Iraq, Kuwait, Afghanistan, Jordan, UAE
- Awards: Defense Superior Service Medal Legion of Merit Bronze Star Medal Meritorious Service Medal Joint Commendation Medal Army Commendation Medal Army Achievement Medal Military Outstanding Volunteer Medal NATO Medal - Afghanistan

Michael R. Eastman is a retired United States Army brigadier general who last served as the Special Assistant to the Director of the Army Staff. Previously, he was the Deputy Commanding General (Support) of the 10th Mountain Division. and the last US General to command Train, Advise, Assist Command - South and Kandahar Airfield, Afghanistan.

A 1991 Distinguished Graduate of the United States Military Academy, Eastman holds a BS in International Relations from the US Military Academy, an MMAS in Military History from the Command and General Staff College, and an MS and PhD(ABD) in Political Science from the Massachusetts Institute of Technology. He also attended the British Higher Command and Staff College in Shrivenham, England as the sole American military representative, and served as a Senior Fellow at the Institute of World Politics.

In October 2021, BG Eastman was appointed as the Executive Director of the ETS Sponsorship Program, a national non-profit dedicated to assisting service members from all branches of the military in their transition back to civilian life.

== Medals and Ribbons ==

Military offices
Preceded by Daniel Walrath	Deputy Director of Operations (Operations Team Four) of the Joint Staff; 2017–2019	Succeeded by William L. Thigpen
Preceded by Andrew Loiselle	Deputy Director of Joint Force Development and Design Integration of the Joint Staff; 2019–2020	Succeeded by Mark A. Melson
Preceded by Michelle A. Schmidt	Deputy Commanding General (Support) of the 10th Mountain Division; 2020–2021	Succeeded by ???
Preceded by Christopher Sharpsten	Special Assistant to the Director of the Army Staff; 2021	Succeeded by Michael R. Fenzel
