= Jeffrey W. Drushal =

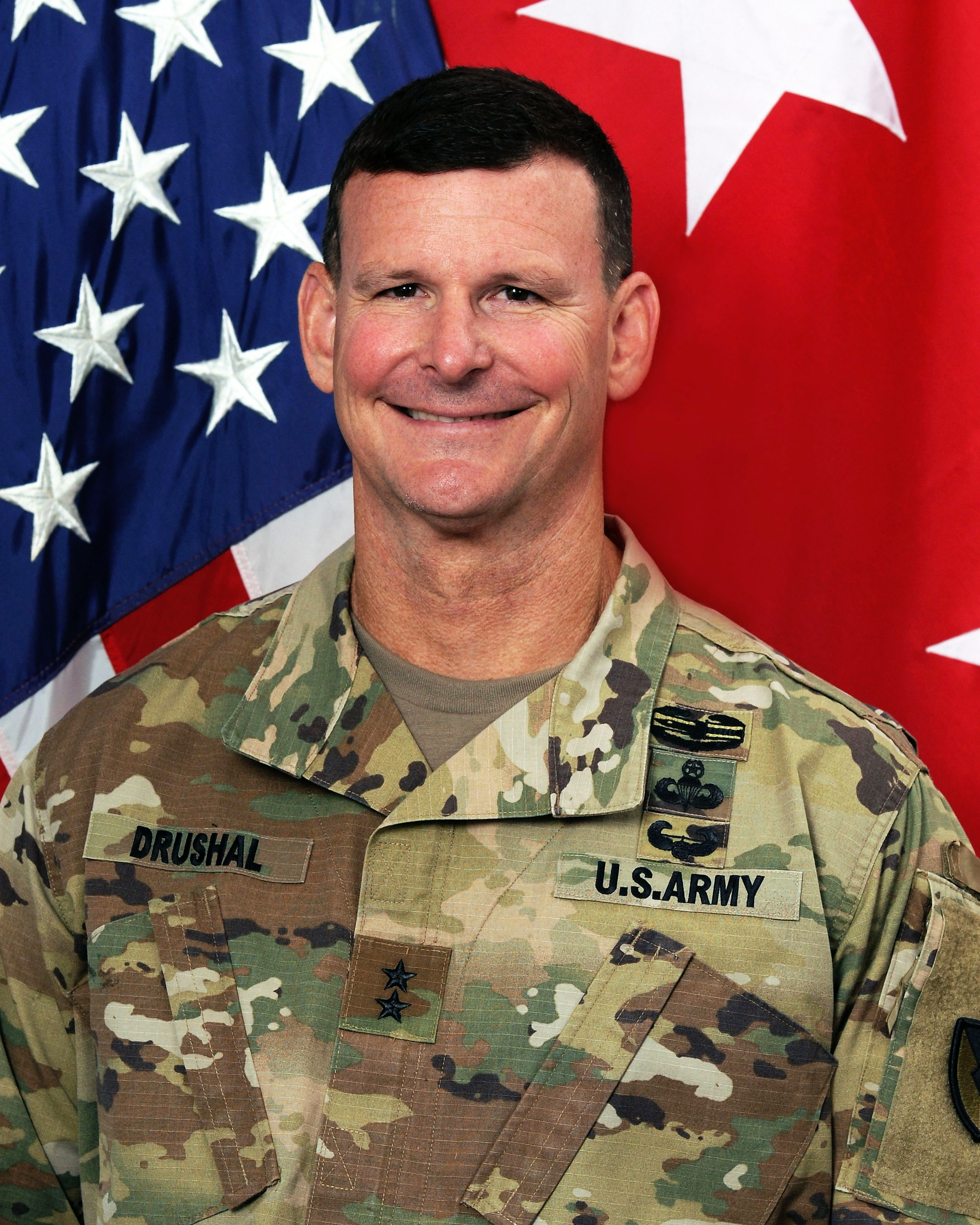
- Military career
- Allegiance: United States
- Branch: United States Army
- Service years: 1989–2022
- Rank: Major general
- Commands: Transportation Corps; United States Army Transportation School; 45th Sustainment Brigade; Joint Logistics Task Force 57; 57th Transportation Battalion
- Conflicts: War in Afghanistan; Iraq War
- Awards: Defense Superior Service Medal; Legion of Merit (2); Bronze Star Medal (5)

Jeffrey W. Drushal is a retired United States Army general who last served as Director of Logistics (J-4), United States Central Command. He previously served as the Chief of the Transportation Corps, headquartered at Fort Lee in Virginia.

Drushal was commissioned as a second lieutenant in the Transportation Corps in 1989 after graduating from the University of Tampa as a Distinguished Military Graduate. He holds a Bachelor of Arts in Business Management from the University of Tampa, a Master of Science in Logistics Management from the Florida Institute of Technology and a Master of Strategic Studies from the United States Army War College. Drushal is also a graduate of the Transportation Officer Basic Course, Combined Logistics Officer Advanced Course, Command and General Staff College, the Logistics Executive Development Course, the United States Army War College, and the Army Senior Leader Seminar program.

Drushal's operational experience encompasses a career spent mostly in non-tactical units with three deployments to Iraq, two deployments to Afghanistan, and one to Kuwait. In Kuwait, then Lieutenant Colonel Drushal commanded Joint Logistics Task Force 57, which consisted of multiple Active Army, Army Reserve, and Air Force elements conducting logistics patrols to and from Iraq. JLTF 57 was instrumental in the withdrawal of United States forces and equipment from Iraq during 2009 and 2010. He also conducted temporary duty at New Orleans International Airport in support of state and national-level relief operations resulting from damage caused by Hurricane Katrina.

Military offices
Preceded by Paul C. Hurley Jr.	Deputy Assistant Chief of Staff for Logistics of the United Nations Command, Combined Forces Command, and United States Forces Korea; 2014–2016	Succeeded by Michel M. Russell Sr.
Preceded by Michel M. Russell Sr.	Chief of Transportation and Commandant of the United States Army Transportation School; 2016–2018	Succeeded by Jered P. Helwig
Preceded by Del Turner	Commanding General of the United States Army Security Assistance Command; 2018–2020	Succeeded by Douglas S. Lowrey
Preceded by Christopher J. Sharpsten	Director of Logistics of the United States Central Command; 2020–2022	Succeeded by Timothy P. White
