= United States Army South =

Army service component command (ASCC)/theater army of the United States

- United States Army South shoulder sleeve insignia
- Active: 1986–2026
- Country: United States
- Branch: United States Army
- Type: Army Service Component Command
- Role: Theater Army
- Part of: United States Army Western Hemisphere Command
- Garrison/HQ: Fort Sam Houston/Joint Base San Antonio
- Mottos: "Defense and Fraternity"
- Engagements: World War II; Operation Just Cause; Operation Uphold Democracy; Operation Unified Response
- Decorations: Meritorious Unit Commendation – 1944, World War II; Army Superior Unit Award- 1994 Operation Uphold Democracy; Army Superior Unit Award – 2011 Operation Unified Response
- Website: arsouth.army.mil

Commanders
- Final Commander: Major General Philip J. Ryan

Insignia
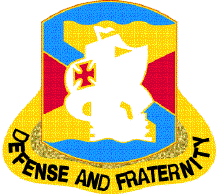
- Distinctive unit insignia

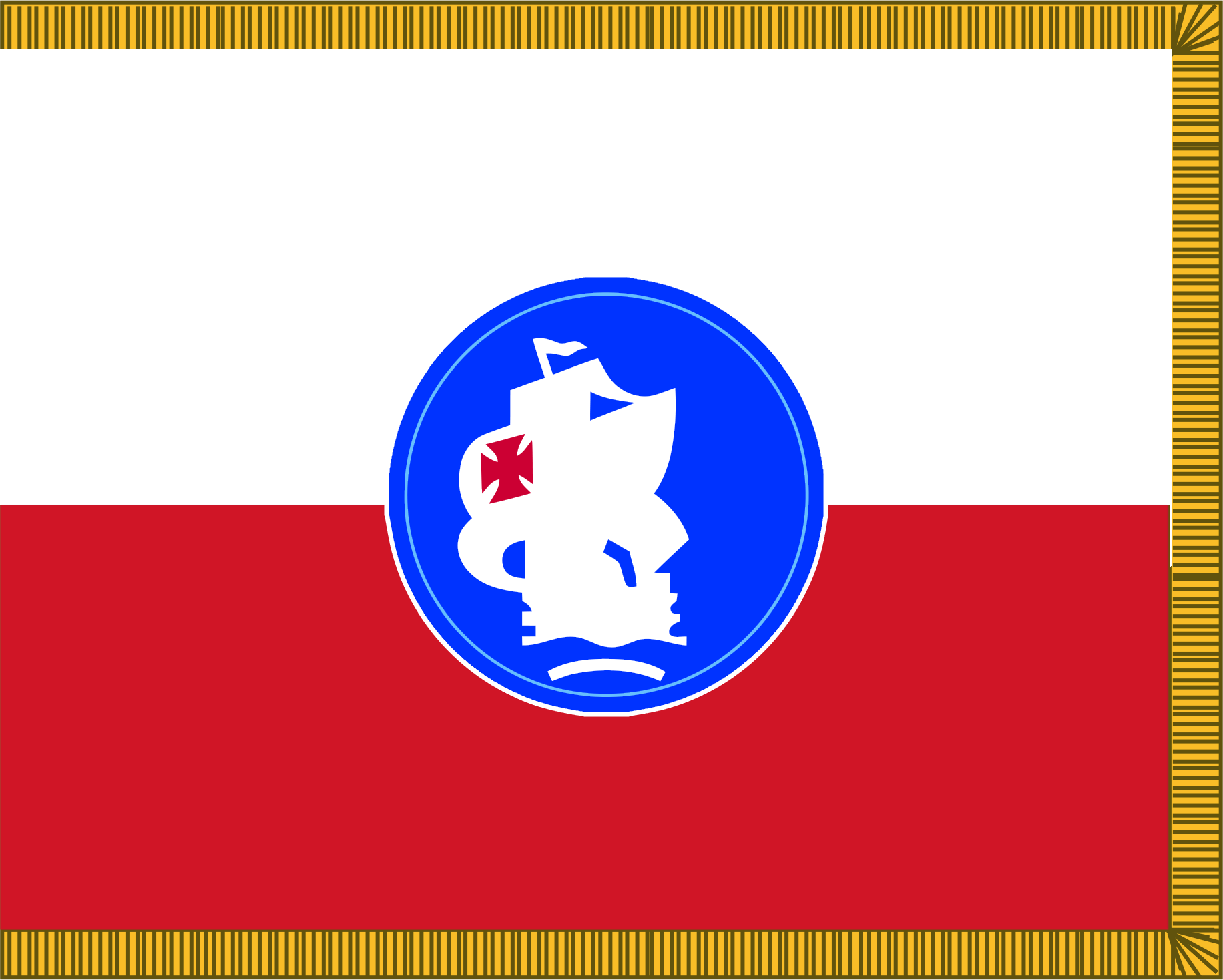
- US Army South Flag

United States Army South (ARSOUTH) was an Army service component command of United States Southern Command whose area of responsibility includes 31 countries and 15 areas of special sovereignty in Central and South America and the Caribbean. It was headquartered at Fort Sam Houston, Texas.

U.S. Army South's final officially stated mission is to conduct and support multinational operations and security cooperation in the United States Southern Command area of responsibility in order to counter transnational threats and strengthen regional security in defense of the homeland. It may be still required to serve as a Joint Task Force Land Component Command or Joint Task Force, as directed.

U.S. Army South, also designated as Sixth Army, officially cased its colors during an inactivation ceremony at Trinity University’s Laurie Auditorium on May 29, 2026. This transition marks a significant step in a historic modernization effort that consolidates three former commands into a single, unified four-star operational headquarters: the United States Army Western Hemisphere Command.

== Predecessors ==
The Isthmian Canal Commission of 1904–1914 and the Panama Canal Guard both played a pivotal role in the construction and early defense of the Canal. The Panama Canal Guard was active from 1907 to 1917. On 1 July 1917, the Panama Canal Department was established as a separate geographic command with headquarters at Quarry Heights. Units included the 19th Brigade, composed of the 14th and 33rd Infantry, the 42nd Field Artillery, the 11th Engineers, and special troops. By 1939, the military strength in the Canal Zone was about 14,000 and by early 1940, the troop strength rose to almost 28,000.

On 15 November 1947, the Panama Canal Department became U.S. Army Caribbean (USARCARIB), headquartered at Fort Amador, following inactivation of the Caribbean Defense Command.. One of its primary missions from 1951 to 1999, was the task of "keeping jungle warfare alive in the Army." Fort Sherman became the home for USARCARIB's Jungle Warfare Training Center (JWTC), which ran up to ten three-week courses per year. Many Soldiers destined for South Vietnam during the Vietnam War first received their jungle training at Fort Sherman.

Secretary of Defense Robert McNamara decided to bolster available U.S. Army forces in the Caribbean area in 1961, after the failed Bay of Pigs Invasion and rumors of Soviet assistance to Cuba. The Army reinforced the resident 1st Battle Group, 20th Infantry Regiment in the Panama Canal Zone with the 193d Infantry Brigade, which was activated on 8 August 1962.

On 6 June 1963, the United States Caribbean Command (the theater command) was re-designated as the United States Southern Command, to reflect primary responsibility in Central and South America, versus the Caribbean. Meanwhile, the United States Army Caribbean was re-designated the United States Army Forces Southern Command (USARSOUTHCOM, later shortened to USARSO).

These actions changed organizations, but the overall missions and responsibilities remained the same. The Army command structure changed again in 1974, possibly due to the end of the Vietnam conflict and the subsequent reduction in Canal Zone jungle training. In any case, USARSOUTHCOM was relieved as a major Army command. [Responsibility was transferred] to Fort McPherson, Georgia, as a subordinate command of the United States Army Forces Command (FORSCOM) on 1 July 1974. The Army component of SOUTHCOM was assumed by the 193rd Infantry Brigade on 31 October 1974, which was redesignated the 193rd Infantry Brigade (Canal Zone) under command of the United States Army Forces Command.

The unified command, USSOUTHCOM, provided operational control for the 193rd [Brigade], which was headquartered at Fort Amador. [It] had been activated in 1962, at that time comprising the 4th Battalion (Mechanized), 20th Infantry; 3rd Battalion, 508th Infantry (Airborne) at Kobbe; and 4th Battalion, 10th Infantry. This configuration enabled the brigade to defend the canal by land, sea, and air. These elements were later joined by the 1st Battalion, 187th Infantry, and 5th Battalion, 87th Infantry. Around this time the secondary missions of Central and South American military support—disaster relief and drug interdiction—began to gather steam. These missions came into their own during the 1980s in an era of regional ideological ferment and the rise of new military strongmen.

During the 1970s, the troop strengths averaged between 10,000 and 14,000 soldiers. Implementation of the Panama Canal Treaties of 1977 on 1 October 1979, brought with it the following changes: a new arrangement for the defense of the Panama Canal; the disestablishment of the Canal Zone; a change in designation for the brigade to 193rd Infantry Brigade (Panama), resulting in the beginning of the process of reorganizing from a heavy to a light infantry brigade; and a headquarters move from Fort Amador to Fort Clayton.

== United States Army South from 1986 ==
On 4 December 1986, the United States Army South was activated as a Major Army Command and the Army component of United States Southern Command, with headquarters at Building 95, Fort Clayton.

Operation Just Cause, the United States military action used to depose Panamanian dictator, General Manuel Antonio Noriega, was officially conducted from 20 December 1989 to 31 January 1990. United States Army South Headquarters became the headquarters for Joint Task Force-South, the headquarters designated to execute the operation. During the Panama Invasion the total troop numbers increased to 27,000. Of these, 13,000 were already stationed in Panama and 14,000 were flown in from the United States.

On 14 October 1994 the 193d Infantry Brigade was the first major unit to inactivate in accordance with the Panama Canal Treaty of 1977 which mandated U.S. Forces withdrawal from Panama by December 1999.

As part of a Unified Command Plan change, United States Southern Command also assumed geographic responsibility for U.S. military forces operating in the Caribbean Basin and the Gulf of Mexico on 1 June 1997. Within this framework, United States Army South's geographical area of responsibility expanded to now include today, 31 countries and 15 areas of special sovereignty in Latin America and the Caribbean, except Puerto Rico and Mexico. In 1998, United States Army South units participated in 15 platoon exchanges at the Jungle Operation Training Center with soldiers from Belize, Colombia, Venezuela, El Salvador, Chile, Argentina, and Paraguay.

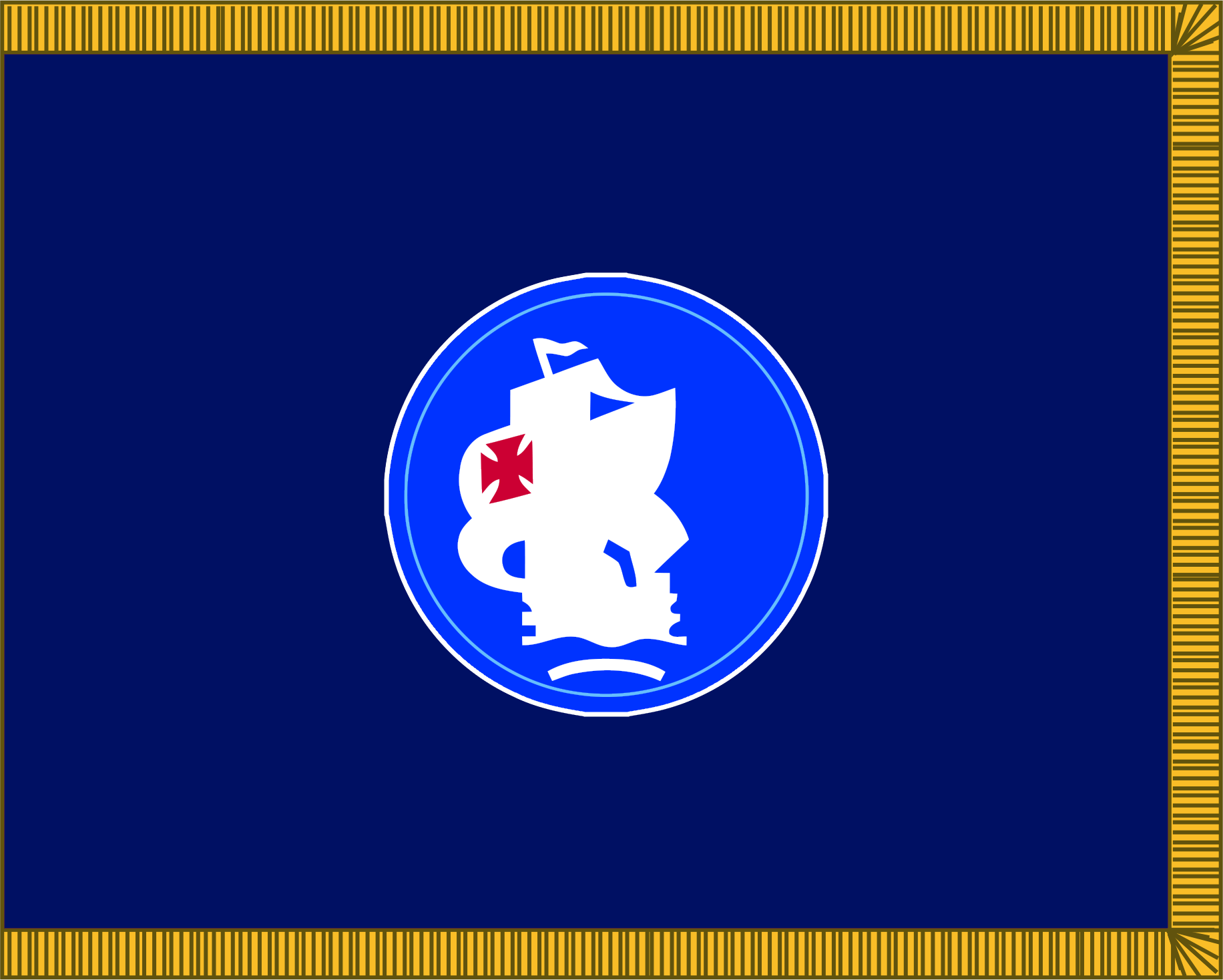
US Army South Flag (pre-2008)

As part of a larger Army transformation in response to the demands of post-9/11 operations worldwide, U.S. Army South merged with U.S. Army South (Sixth Army) on 16 July 2008, a change that expanded its size and capabilities to include an Operational Command Post (OCP) that could serve as the nucleus of a Joint Task Force (JTF) or Joint Forces Land Component Command (JFLCC) headquarters anywhere in the U.S. Southern Command Area of Responsibility. In addition, U.S. Army South incorporated the lineage and heraldry from Sixth U.S. Army. While U.S. Army South received an exception to policy from the Army Chief of Staff to retain its distinctive Spanish galleon insignia, its colors were merged with 6th Army's to mark the new, combined lineage and heraldry of the two historic organizations—one that played a pivotal role in the security of the Panama Canal and the broader region of Latin America and the Caribbean, and one that fought a series of famous battles in the Pacific theater of the Second World War.

U.S. Army South administers Post Isolation Support Activities (PISA), a 10-day program at the Brooke Army Medical Center in San Antonio, Texas, to help former hostages acclimate back to regular life.

In 2025, Secretary of the Army Dan Driscoll announced U.S. Army South would merge with United States Army North to create the U.S. Army Western Hemisphere Command as a unified command under Forces Command. On May 29, 2026, U.S Army South deactivated with a formal inactivation ceremony held in San Antonio, Texas

== Organization ==
The organizational makeup of the command in 2019 was as follows;

- United States Army South Headquarters and Headquarters Battalion, Fort Sam Houston, Texas
- 470th Military Intelligence Brigade, Fort Sam Houston, Texas
- 56th Signal Battalion, Fort Sam Houston, Texas
- 512th Engineer Detachment (Geospatial Planning Cell), Fort Sam Houston, Texas
- Army Forces, Honduras (Joint Task Force Bravo), Soto Cano Air Base, Honduras
  - 1st Battalion, 228th Aviation Regiment, Soto Cano Air Base
- 377th Theater Sustainment Command, New Orleans, Louisiana
- 807th Deployment Support Medical Command, Fort Douglas, Utah
- 525th Military Police Battalion, Guantanamo Bay Naval Base

== Commanders ==
- MG Frederick F. Woerner Jr. 1982–1986
- MG James B. Taylor 1986–1987
- MG Edward H. Brooks November 1947–1949
- MG Bernard Loeffke April 1987–March 1989
- MG Marc Cisneros March 1989-1990
- BG Joseph W. Kinzer 1990
- BG William W. Hartzog 1990–1991
- MG Richard F. Timmons 1991–1993
- BG J. L. Wilson 1993
- MG George A. Crocker 1993–1995
- MG Lawson W. Magruder III 1995–1997
- MG Philip R. Kensinger Jr. 1997–2000
- MG Alfred A. Valenzuela 2000–2003
- MG John D. Gardner 2003–2005
- MG Ken Keen 2005–2007

No.	Commanding General		Term		
No.	Portrait	Name	Took office	Left office	Term length
-	Keith M. Huber	Major General; Keith M. Huber	August 2007	10 November 2009	~2 years, 101 days
-	Simeon G. Trombitas	Major General; Simeon G. Trombitas	10 November 2009	24 September 2012	2 years, 319 days
-	Frederick S. Rudesheim	Major General; Frederick S. Rudesheim	24 September 2012	24 June 2013	273 days
-	Joseph P. DiSalvo	Major General; Joseph P. DiSalvo	24 June 2013	4 June 2015	1 year, 345 days
-	Clarence K. K. Chinn	Major General; Clarence K. K. Chinn	4 June 2015	3 October 2017	2 years, 121 days
-	Mark R. Stammer	Major General; Mark R. Stammer	3 October 2017	15 July 2019	1 year, 285 days
-	Daniel R. Walrath	Major General; Daniel R. Walrath	15 July 2019	30 June 2021	1 year, 350 days
-	William L. Thigpen	Major General; William L. Thigpen	30 June 2021	28 June 2024	2 years, 364 days
-	Philip J. Ryan	Major General; Philip J. Ryan	28 June 2024	Incumbent	2 years, 98 days
