= Simeon G. Trombitas =

U.S. Army general

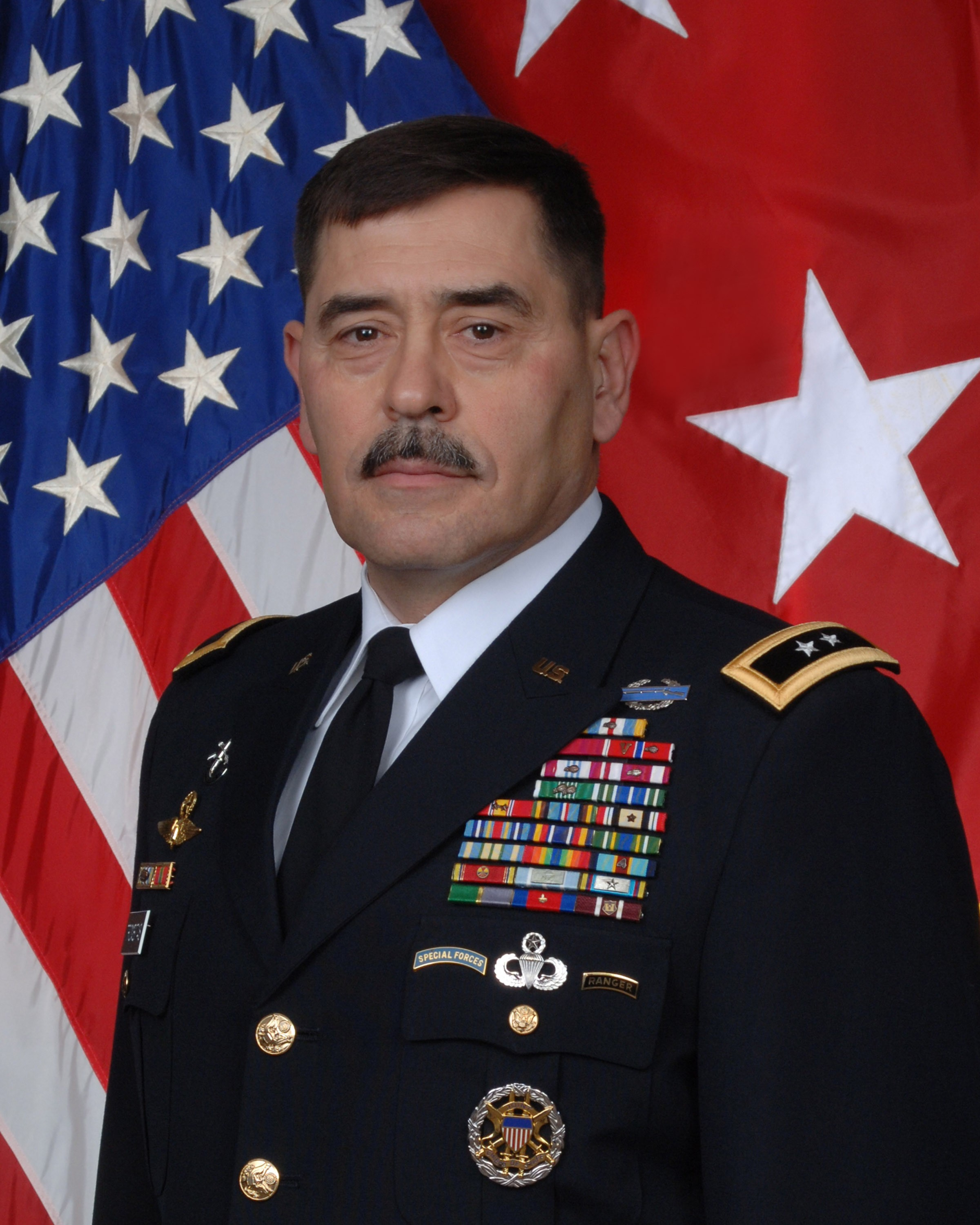
- Trombitas in 2009
- Born: Simeon George Trombitas; September 11, 1955 (age 70); Warren, Ohio, US
- Allegiance: United States
- Branch: United States Army
- Service years: 1978–2015
- Rank: Major general
- Commands: United States Army South

Simeon G. Trombitas (born September 11, 1955) is a retired United States Army major general who served as the Commanding General of United States Army South from November 10, 2009 to September 24, 2012.

== Biography ==
He was born on September 11, 1955 to John Trombitas Sr. and Dorothy V. Trombitas née (Maier) Moyer of Warren, Ohio. He is of Hungarian descent on his father's side. He graduated from the Lordstown High School in 1973. In 1978, Trombitas graduated from the United States Military Academy with a Bachelor of Science degree and was commissioned as a 2nd Lieutenant in to the Infantry Branch. His military education includes the Basic Officer Leaders Course, the Armor Officer Advanced Course, the Special Forces Officer Qualification Course, the United States Army Command and General Staff College, and the Armed Forces Staff College. He earned a Masters Degree in National Security Strategy from the U.S. Army War College.

He began his active duty in the 41st Infantry Regiment, 2nd Armored Division as an Infantry Platoon Leader, Scout Platoon Leader and Infantry Company Commander at Fort Hood, Texas. He was assigned to the Joint Readiness Training Center as a Senior Infantry Company Observer Controller. He served three tours in the 7th Special Forces Group (Airborne) as an ODA Commander, Special Forces Company Commander, Battalion Operations (S3) Officer, Group Executive Officer and Special Forces Battalion Commander. Assigned to USMILGP, El Salvador, he served as Senior Advisor to the 4th El Salvadoran Infantry Brigade. He served as the Assistant Deputy Director for Operations of United States Army Special Operations Command and Commander, U.S. Army Garrison, 7th Infantry Division and Fort Carson, Colorado. His Joint Duty Assignments include Deputy Director of Operations, United States Army Special Operations Command South in Panama; Commander, U.S. Military Group in Bogotá, Colombia, and Chief Regional Special Operations, Special Operations Division (J3), the Joint Staff, in Washington, D.C.

He served as a general officer in various duty assignments beginning as the Commanding General, Special Operations Command Korea. He assumed command of the Iraqi Counter Terrorism Service Transition Team, during Operation Iraqi Freedom. He commanded U.S. Army South from 2009 to 2012, including deployment to Haiti for Operation Unified Response. He also served as the Senior Defense Official/Defense Attache at the U.S. Embassy in Mexico City, Mexico. His next assignment was the Deputy Commanding General of United States Army North. He retired in 2015. After retirement he worked as a security consultant and in 2017 became the Chairman of the Board Emeritus of the Green Beret Foundation.

== Personal life ==
Simeon Trombitas is married to Kellie Snyder and they have two children: Paul and Simeon.

== Awards and decorations ==

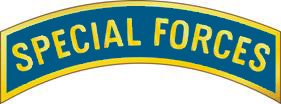

Unit Awards and badges
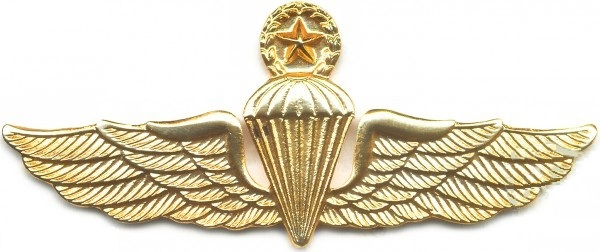

Pocket Badges
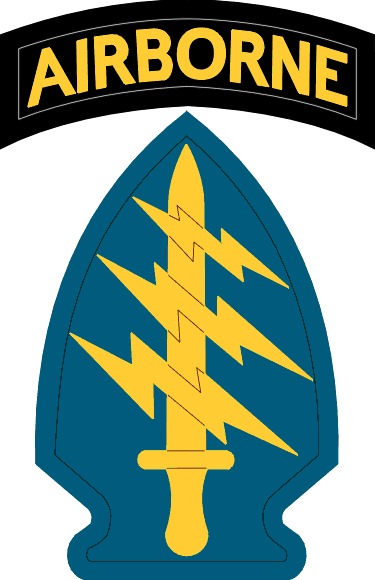

Badge	Combat Infantryman Badge			
Badge	Master Parachutist Badge			
1st row	Defense Superior Service Medal with one oak leaf cluster			
2nd row	Legion of Merit	Bronze Star with V device and one oak leaf cluster	Defense Meritorious Service Medal with one oak leaf cluster	
4th row	Meritorious Service Medal with one oak leaf cluster	Army Commendation Medal with two oak leaf clusters	Army Achievement Medal	
4th row	National Defense Service Medal with two bronze service stars	Armed Forces Expeditionary Medal	Iraq Campaign Medal with bronze service star	
5th row	Global War on Terrorism Expeditionary Medal	Global War on Terrorism Service Medal	Korea Defense Service Medal	
6th row	Military Outstanding Volunteer Service Medal	Army Service Ribbon	Army Overseas Service Ribbon with award numeral 4	
7th row	Order of Military Merit José María Córdova Officers Class	Order of Naval Merit Admiral Padilla Commanders Class	Air Force Cross of Aeronautical Merit Commanders Class	
8th row	Medalla Militar Ministerio de Defensa National Servicios Distinguidos de Columbia	Distinguished Service Medal of the Colombian Marine Corps	Medalla Torre de Castilla de Columbia	
Badges on left breast pocket lapel	Special Forces Tab		Ranger Tab	
Badges above right breast pocket lapel	United States Army Special Forces Distinctive unit insignia			Columbian Master Parachutist Badge
Unit awards above right breast pocket label	Joint Meritorious Unit Award with three oak leaf clusters		Valorous Unit Award with one oak leaf cluster	
Pocket Badges	Joint Chiefs of Staff Identification Badge			1st Special Forces Command (Airborne) Combat Service Identification Badge

Military offices
Preceded by Keith M. Huber	Commanding General of United States Army South; 2009–2012	Succeeded by Frederick S. Rudesheim
