= Frederick F. Woerner Jr. =

American general (1933–2023)

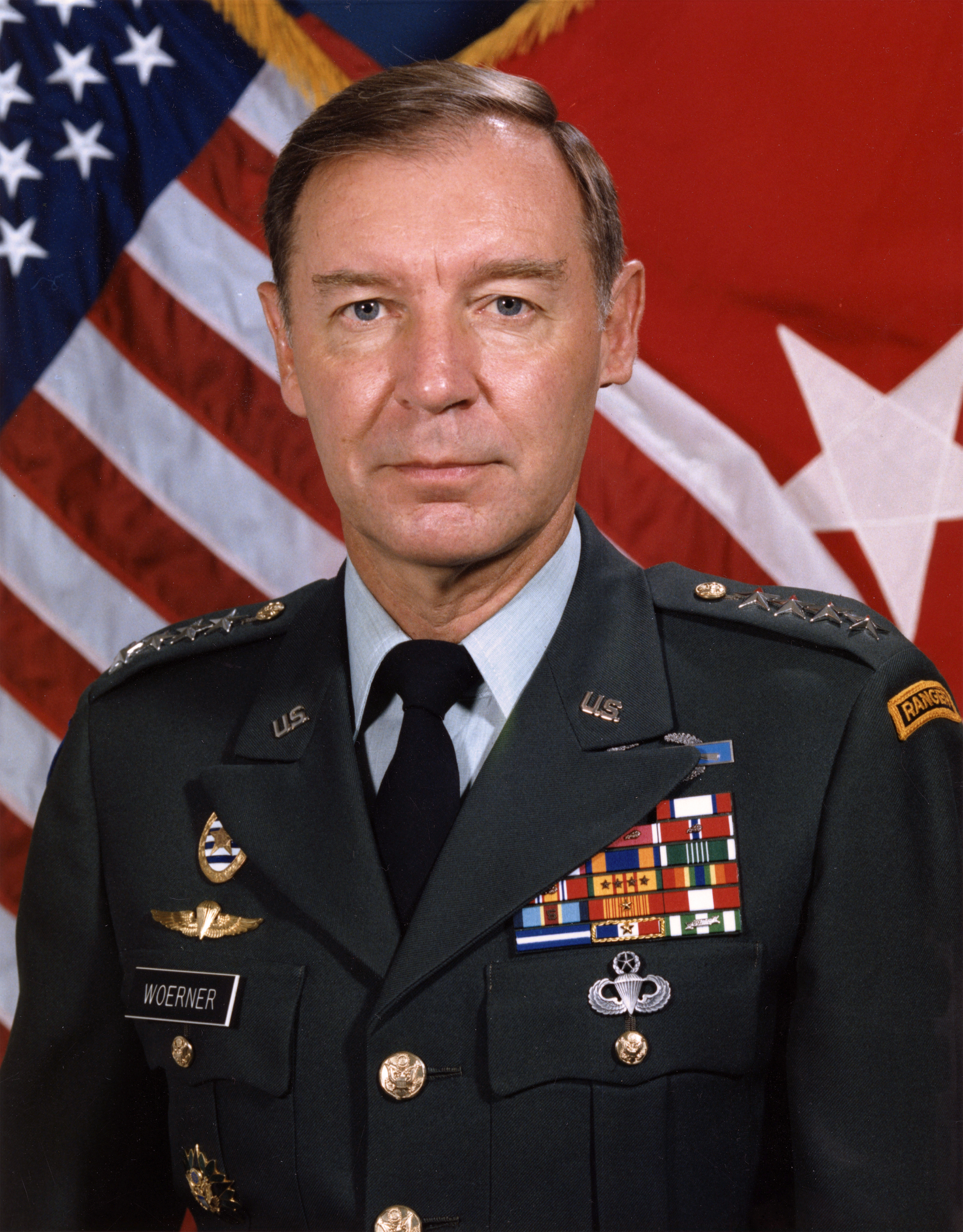
- Born: 12 August 1933; Philadelphia, Pennsylvania, U.S.
- Died: 29 March 2023 (aged 89); Gilbert, South Carolina, U.S.
- Burial place: West Point Cemetery
- Education: United States Military Academy (BS); University of Arizona (MA)
- Military career
- Allegiance: United States
- Branch: United States Army
- Service years: 1955–1989
- Rank: General
- Commands: United States Southern Command; Sixth United States Army; 193rd Infantry Brigade; 3rd Basic Combat Brigade; 1st Battalion, 6th Infantry Regiment
- Conflicts: Vietnam War
- Awards: Defense Distinguished Service Medal; Army Distinguished Service Medal (2); Legion of Merit (3); Bronze Star Medal (2)
- Other work: Professor, Boston University; Chairman, American Battle Monuments Commission

Frederick Frank Woerner Jr. (12 August 1933 – 29 March 2023) was an American general who last served as the Commander-in-Chief of the United States Southern Command from 1987 to 1989. After retiring from the United States Army, he was a professor of international relations at Boston University from 1990 to 2003, and also served as chairman of the American Battle Monuments Commission from 1994 to 2001.

Woerner was born in Philadelphia, Pennsylvania. He graduated from the United States Military Academy in 1955 and was commissioned as an Infantry officer. He later obtained a Master of Arts degree in Latin American history from the University of Arizona in 1965. His service in the Army included tours as a battalion commander and military advisor in South Vietnam during the Vietnam War, and multiple deployments in Latin America. Woerner lived in Colombia and traveled across northern South America from 1965 to 1966, then served as a military advisor in Guatemala from 1966 to 1969. He studied at Uruguay's general staff college from 1969 to 1970, and later served as the director of Latin American studies at the US Army War College from 1973 to 1977.

Woerner's notable commands included the 193rd Infantry Brigade and the US Army Security Assistance Agency, Latin America, while stationed in Panama from 1982 to 1986. He then commanded the United States Sixth Army at the Presidio, San Francisco, from 1986 to 1987, before returning to Panama as Commander-in-Chief of the Southern Command. In that role, he managed increasing tensions between American forces and the regime of Manuel Noriega. He began a gradual troop build-up in May 1989 for a possible intervention, on the order of President George H. W. Bush. His incremental preparations were criticized by other military leaders, and he was removed by the Bush administration.

== Early life, family, and education ==
Frederick Frank Woerner Jr. was born on 12 August 1933 in Philadelphia, Pennsylvania. He attended the William Penn Charter School under an endowment, and graduated in 1951. Woerner graduated from the United States Military Academy at West Point, New York, in 1955, receiving a Bachelor of Science degree in engineering, and being commissioned as a United States Army Infantry officer. He obtained a Master of Arts degree in Latin American history at the University of Arizona in 1965. He was married to Gennie (Ehrhorn) Woerner, and they had four children.

His military education included the US Army's Infantry Officer Basic and Advanced Courses in 1961, the Command and General Staff College in 1964, and the War College in 1973. He also studied at the Uruguayan Military Institute of Superior Studies (a general staff college) from 1969 to 1970. Worner was fluent in Spanish.

== Army career ==
Woerner served as a company commander in the 23rd Infantry Regiment from 1961 to 1962, and was a member of the Military Assistance Command, Vietnam, from 1962 to 1963. After attending the Command and Staff College, he lived in Colombia and traveled through northern South America from 1965 to 1966, and then served with the United States Military Group in Guatemala from 1966 to 1969, as a Civic Action Officer. He advised the Guatemalan government on the use of military forces in national socioeconomic development. After studying in Montevideo, Uruguay, Woerner was deployed for the Vietnam War again, serving as a battalion commander in the 6th Infantry Regiment from 1970 to 1971, and as the Chief of Organization and Training in the Office of the Assistant Chief of Staff, G3 (Operations), in the XXIV Corps, from 1971 to 1972. He also advised the Republic of Vietnam Armed Forces.

After returning from Vietnam, he was initially assigned to the Army Staff in Washington, D.C., until 1973. Woerner served in the General Military Training and Support Branch, in the Office of the Assistant Chief of Staff for Force Development. After the studying at the US Army War College in 1973, he stayed there as Director, The Americas Studies. In that role, Woerner spent four years teaching Latin American studies at the War College, due to his expertise in the region. From 1977 to 1979, he commanded the 3rd Basic Combat Training Brigade at Fort Leonard Wood, Missouri. From 1979 to 1980, he was the chief of staff of the 24th Infantry Division at Fort Stewart, Georgia. Woerner concurrently served as the deputy commanding general of the Combined Arms Training Development Activity and the director of the Echelons Above Corps Study Group at the Combined Arms Center, from 1980 to 1982, at Fort Leavenworth, Kansas.

In early 1981, as a brigadier general, Woerner led a team of US military officers to El Salvador, where they studied the nation's armed forces and attempted to devise a winning strategy for them in the Salvadoran Civil War. Their assessment was completed in November 1981. Woerner was promoted to major general on 14 December 1981. The Woerner team's classified analysis of the Salvadoran military concluded that it will not be able to defeat the insurgency due to its use of conventional tactics against guerrilla fighters and corruption in the officer corps. When the conclusion of the report was revealed to the public in 1983, Woerner told members of Congress that its findings were still true.

Woerner concurrently served as commanding general of the 193rd Infantry Brigade and commander of the United States Army Security Assistance Agency, Latin America, at the United States Southern Command headquarters in Panama from 1982 to 1986. He was promoted to lieutenant general on 4 February 1986. He then served as commanding general of the United States Sixth Army at the Presidio, San Francisco, from March 1986 to June 1987, responsible for the readiness for mobilization of all Army National Guard forces and Army Reserve units in the twelve western states. He was nominated to become Commander-in-Chief of Southern Command on 1 April 1987, succeeding Gen. John R. Galvin, and was promoted to general on 15 May. Woerner took command on 6 June 1987.

As the head of SOUTHCOM, he was responsible for mission performance, training, and welfare of all Department of the Army personnel in Central America, Panama, and South America. During 1988 and 1989, under the leadership of Woerner and Maj. Gen. Bernard Loeffke, the commander of United States Army South, the American troops managed increasing tensions between them and President Manuel Noriega's Panamanian security forces. In May 1989, when violence escalated, President George H. W. Bush ordered a troop build up in the region, Operation Elaborate Maze, which Woerner tried to implement gradually. Due to disagreements that Woerner had with Pentagon leaders who wanted a faster build up, Bush had him removed. Woerner relinquished command to Gen. Maxwell R. Thurman on 30 September 1989, and retired from the Army on 31 October 1989.

== Later life ==
From 1990 to 2003 Woerner was a Professor of International Relations at Boston University. He was a tenured full professor teaching in the Department of International Relations, College of Arts and Sciences. He taught courses addressing United States national security and Latin America. From 1994 to 2001, he was the chairman of the American Battle Monuments Commission.

Woerner served as senior executive for the completion of the project to build the congressionally mandated World War II Memorial on the National Mall in Washington, DC, including design, private fund raising, construction, and dedication. He was also responsible for commemorating the services of the armed forces through the management of 24 military burial grounds and 28 monuments/markers located worldwide, and the construction of new memorials.

Woerner died on 29 March 2023 at his home in Gilbert, South Carolina. He was buried at the West Point Cemetery.

== Awards and decorations ==
Woerner's awards and decorations include: Defense Distinguished Service Medal, Army Distinguished Service Medal with one Oak Leaf Cluster, Legion of Merit with two Oak Leaf Clusters, Bronze Star Medal with one Oak Leaf Cluster, Meritorious Service Medal, Air Medal, Army Commendation Medal, National Defense Service Medal with one Oak Leaf Cluster, Armed Forces Expeditionary Medal, Army Service Ribbon with numeral five, Vietnam Service Medal with four Bronze Stars, Argentine Order of May of Military Merit (Grand Officer Grade), El Salvadoran Gold Medal for Merit, El Salvadoran Gold Medal for Distinguished Service, Guatemalan Cross of Military Merit First Class, Honduran Armed Forces Cross, Panamanian Distinguished Service Medal, Venezuelan Star of Carabobo, Vietnam Cross of Gallantry with Gold Star, U.S. Combat Infantryman Badge, Master Parachutist Badge, Ranger Tab, Army General Staff Badge, Ecuadorian Parachutist Badge, Guatemalan Parachutist Badge, Honduran Parachutist Badge, Panamanian Parachutist Badge, Paraguayan Parachutist Badge, and Uruguayan General Staff Badge.

Military offices
Preceded by Robert Arter	Commanding General of the United States Sixth Army; 1987–1989	Succeeded by James E. Moore Jr.
Preceded by John R. Galvin	Commander-in-Chief of United States Southern Command; 1987–1989	Succeeded by Maxwell R. Thurman
