= John Galvin (general) =

American general (1929–2015)

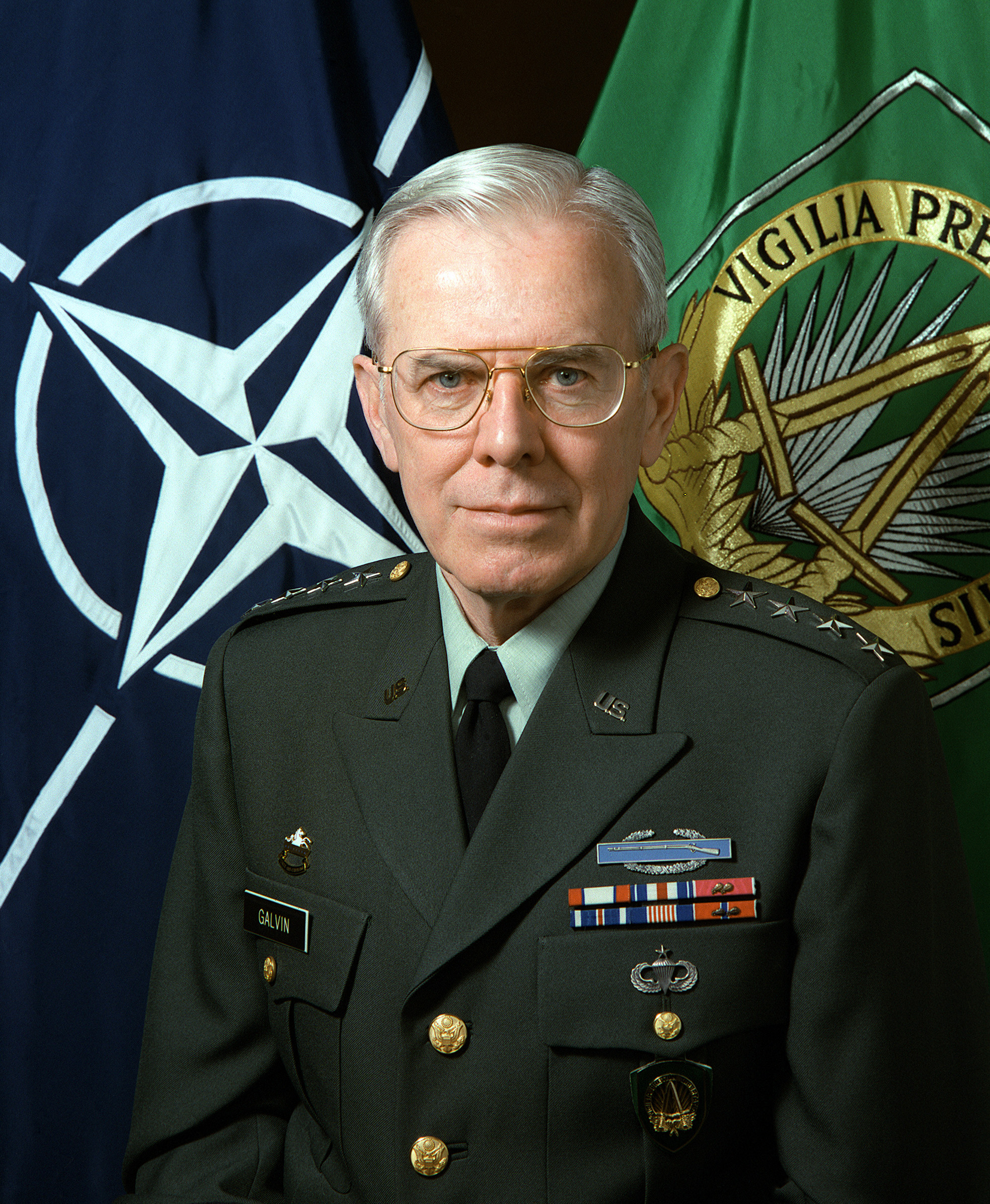
- Official portrait, 1991
- Born: John Rogers Galvin; 13 May 1929; Wakefield, Massachusetts, U.S.
- Died: 25 September 2015 (aged 86); Jonesboro, Georgia, U.S.
- Burial place: Arlington National Cemetery
- Education: United States Military Academy (BS); University of Columbia (MA)
- Military career
- Allegiance: United States
- Branch: United States Army; Army National Guard
- Service years: 1948–1950 (National Guard); 1954–1992
- Rank: General
- Commands: Supreme Allied Commander Europe; United States European Command; United States Southern Command; VII Corps; 24th Infantry Division; 3rd Infantry Division Support Command; 1st Battalion, 8th Cavalry Regiment
- Conflicts: Vietnam War
- Awards: Silver Star; Legion of Merit (3); Distinguished Flying Cross; Soldier's Medal; Bronze Star (3); Air Medal with "V" Device
- Other work: Fletcher School of Law and Diplomacy, Tufts University, Commission on National Security/21st Century

John Rogers Galvin (13 May 1929 – 25 September 2015) was an American general whose last post was concurrently as NATO Supreme Allied Commander Europe and Commander-in-Chief of the United States European Command from 1987 to 1992. After his retirement from the United States Army, he was the dean of the Fletcher School of Law and Diplomacy at Tufts University from 1995 to 2000, and a member of the Commission on National Security/21st Century.

Galvin was born in Wakefield, Massachusetts. He enlisted in the Massachusetts Army National Guard in 1948 served as a medic before applying for and being accepted into the United States Military Academy in 1950. After graduating and being commissioned as an Infantry officer in 1954, he served in Puerto Rico and in Colombia during the 1950s, including as a Lancero instructor, the Colombian equivalent of Ranger School. He graduated from Columbia University in 1962 with a master's degree in English and then worked at West Point. Galvin had two combat deployments in the Vietnam War during the late 1960s, for which he received multiple awards, including the Silver Star, the Legion of Merit, the Distinguished Flying Cross, the Soldier's Medal, and the Air Medal with the "V" device for valor in combat.

He served in Europe for much of the 1970s in multiple command and staff roles. His notable commands later included the 24th Infantry Division in the United States from 1981 to 1983, and the VII Corps in West Germany from 1983 to 1985. As Commander-in-Chief of the United States Southern Command in Panama from 1985 to 1987, Galvin was involved in negotiations with presidents Manuel Noriega of Panama and Augusto Pinochet of Chile.

While serving as supreme allied commander in Europe and head of the US European Command, Galvin presided over reforms to NATO forces amidst reductions after the end of the Cold War. He also directed NATO assets to provide support for the Gulf War, including the missile defense of Israel; for operations in Zaire, Liberia, and elsewhere in Africa; and for humanitarian assistance to former Warsaw Pact countries. During his tenure, Galvin was awarded the Defense, Army, Navy, and Air Force Distinguished Service Medals by the United States, and received honors from several European NATO countries.

== Early life, family, and education ==
John Rogers Galvin was born on 13 May 1929 in Wakefield, Massachusetts. He graduated from Wakefield High School and began studying at Boston University. However, he decided to enlist in the Massachusetts Army National Guard in 1948 and served as a medic in the 182nd Infantry Regiment until 1950, when he applied for and received a National Guard appointment to the United States Military Academy at West Point, New York. He graduated in 1954 with a Bachelor of Science degree in military science, and was commissioned as a second lieutenant of Infantry in the United States Army. This made him the first member of his family to get a college degree.

In 1962, he graduated from Columbia University with a Master of Arts degree in English. Galvin later did graduate work at the University of Pennsylvania. His further military education included the US Army's Infantry Officer Basic and Armor Officer Advanced Courses (the latter in 1961), the Command and General Staff College in 1966, and the War College in 1973. He spoke Spanish and German.

He was married to Virginia Lee (Brennan) Galvin, and they had four daughters.

== Army career ==
Galvin served in the 65th Infantry Regiment in Puerto Rico from 1955 to 1956. He then became an instructor at the Lancero School of the Colombian Army, the Colombian equivalent of the US Army Ranger School, and remained there until 1958. He served in the 101st Airborne Division from 1958 to 1960, and after the Armor Officer Advanced Course, he studied at the University of Columbia. Having received his master's degree, Galvin taught in the English department at the US Military Academy from 1962 to 1965. In 1966 he graduated from the Command and Staff College, and served as Assistant Chief of Staff (G2) of the 1st Air Cavalry Division, deployed for the Vietnam War, until 1967.

From 1969 to 1970, deployed again to South Vietnam, as a lieutenant colonel Galvin commanded the 1st Battalion, 8th Cavalry Regiment, 1st Cavalry Division. For his actions as the battalion's commander he received multiple awards, including the Silver Star Medal, the Distinguished Flying Cross, the Legion of Merit, and the Soldier's Medal. He was also awarded several Air Medals with the "V" device. Upon his return, he served as Publications and Presentations Branch Chief at the Army Combat Developments Command with the rank of colonel, from 1970 to 1972. He was then a student at the War College and a fellow at the Fletcher School of Law and Diplomacy until 1973.

After his completion of the War College, Galvin spent seven years in Europe. From 1973 to 1974, he served as Deputy Secretary of the Joint Staff at Headquarters, United States European Command. From 1974 to 1975, he was Military Assistant to the Supreme Allied Commander Europe at Supreme Headquarters Allied Powers Europe (SHAPE). Galvin commanded the 3rd Infantry Division Support Command in West Germany from 1975 to 1977, and the served as the division's chief of staff until 1978. That year, he was promoted to brigadier general. From then until 1980 Galvin served as assistant division commander of the 8th Infantry Division. Returning to the United States, he served as the Assistant Deputy Chief of Staff for Training at Army Training and Doctrine Command (TRADOC) from 1980 to 1981. He was promoted to major general on 14 December 1981. Galvin was the commanding general of the 24th Infantry Division from 1981 to 1983. He designed and implemented programs that improved the division's combat readiness.

He was promoted to lieutenant general on 10 May 1983, and returned to Europe to command the VII Corps in West Germany, which he did from 1983 to 1985.

=== Combatant commander ===
Galvin served as the head of two unified combatant commands. He was nominated to become Commander-in-Chief of the United States Southern Command by President Ronald Reagan on 12 January 1985, succeeding Gen. Paul F. Gorman. Promoted to general on 31 January 1985, he assumed command in Panama later that year. After taking office, Galvin called his staff together and told them that their task was to convince the Panamanian government to not send away American forces after US control over the Panama Canal expired at the end of 1999. During his tenure, he was involved in negotiations with President Manuel Noriega of Panama, and with President Augusto Pinochet of Chile. Galvin also supported the US-backed Contras in the Nicaraguan Civil War. He relinquished command on 6 June 1987 to Gen. Frederick Woerner.

Galvin, who was known for his support of Reagan's anti-communist stance, was nominated to serve as NATO Supreme Allied Commander Europe and Commander-in-Chief of the United States European Command on 26 February 1987. He took command from Gen. Bernard W. Rogers on 26 June 1987. In that role, he was involved in directing NATO resources to assist in the Gulf War, which included the Patriot missile defense of Israel and the rescue of 450,000 Kurdish refugees in northern Iraq. He began reforming NATO forces after the dissolution of the Soviet Union and the end of the Cold War, as there were reductions in conventional and nuclear arms. Galvin also had a role in supporting operations in Zaire, Liberia, and elsewhere in Africa, as well as humanitarian support for former Warsaw Pact countries. For his leadership as SACEUR, he was awarded the United States Defense, Army, Navy, and Air Force Distinguished Service Medals, and received honors from several other NATO countries.

Also during his time as SACEUR many stay-behind networks in Europe were dismantled, a process that started with the revelations by Italy's then prime minister, Giulio Andreotti, who disclosed to the Italian Parliament the existence of a Gladio stay-behind anti-communist paramilitary network headed by NATO and present in most European countries. Galvin relinquished command on 24 June 1992, and retired from the Army on 1 July 1992.

== Later life ==
Upon retirement from the Army, Galvin became the John M. Olin Distinguished Professor of National Security Studies at the US Military Academy, where he remained until 1994. He was also a visiting policy analyst at Ohio State University from 1994 to 1995, and was involved in the negotiations related to the Bosnian War with the State Department in 1994. Galvin was the dean of the Fletcher School of Law and Diplomacy at Tufts University from 1995 to 2000. He received a 1997 Distinguished Graduate Award from the West Point Association of Graduates.

On 25 September 2015, he died in Jonesboro, Georgia, at the age of 86.

== Awards and decorations ==

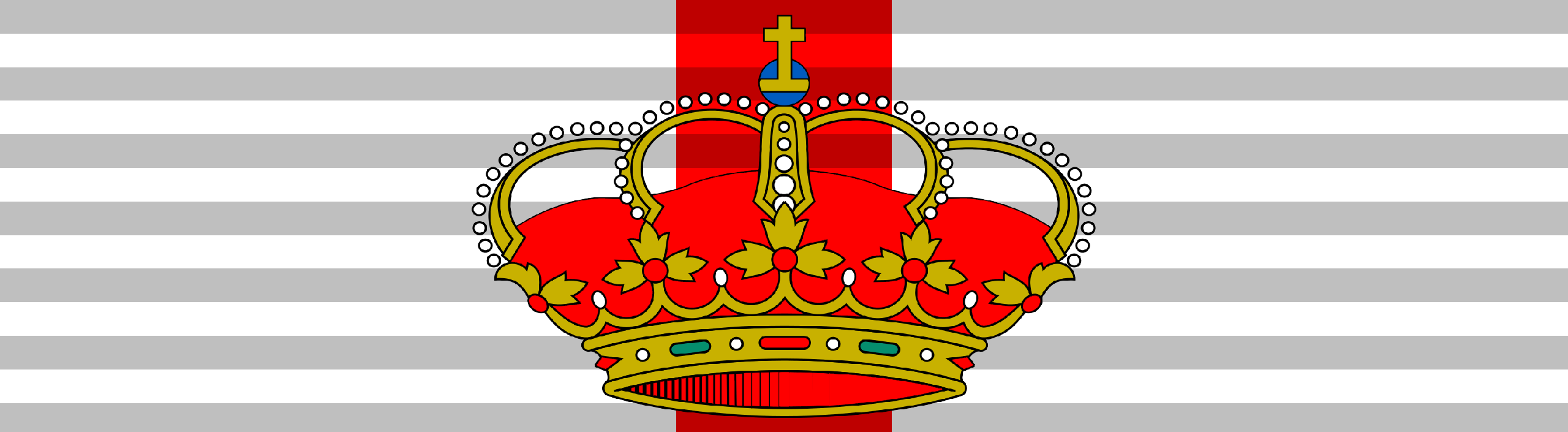

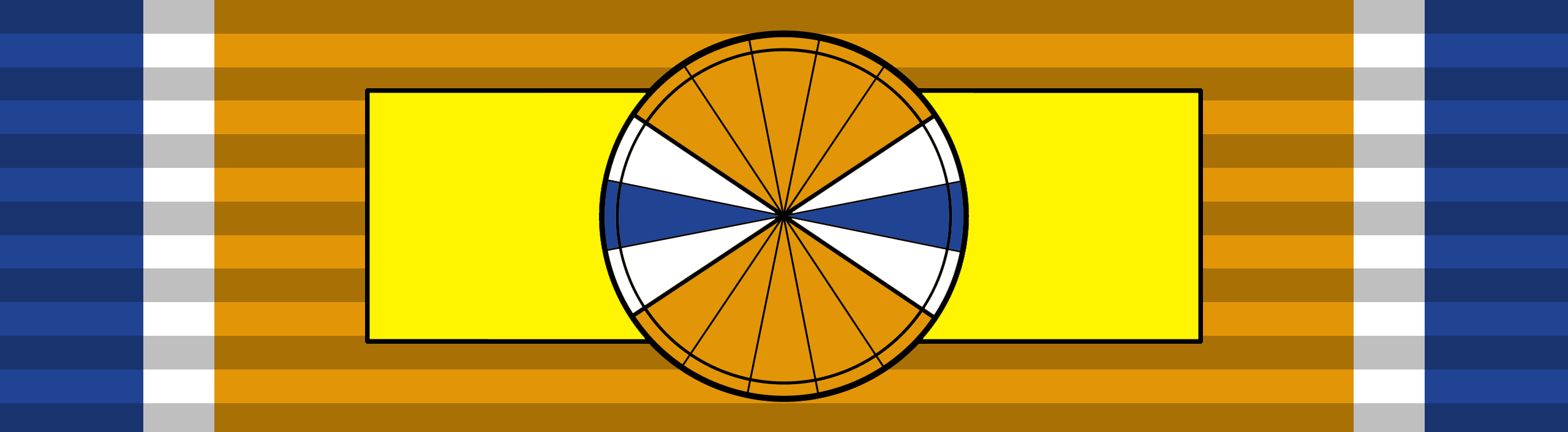

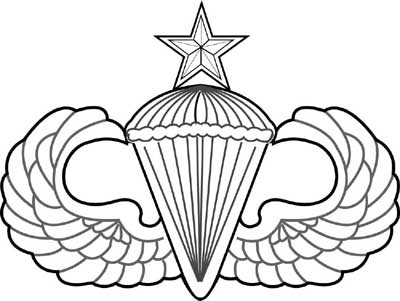

Badge	Combat Infantryman Badge		
1st Row	Defense Distinguished Service Medal with oak leaf cluster		Army Distinguished Service Medal with oak leaf cluster
2nd Row	Navy Distinguished Service Medal	Air Force Distinguished Service Medal	Silver Star
3rd Row	Legion of Merit with two oak leaf clusters	Distinguished Flying Cross	Soldier's Medal
4th Row	Bronze Star Medal with two oak leaf clusters	Air Medal with V Device	National Defense Service Medal with one bronze service star
5th Row	Vietnam Service Medal with three bronze campaign stars	Army Service Ribbon	Army Overseas Service Ribbon
6th Row	Great Cross of Merit with star (Federal Republic of Germany)	Bavarian Order of Merit	Légion d'honneur Grand Officier
7th Row	Order of Military Merit; Grand Cross (Spain)	Order of Orange-Nassau; Grand Cross, 1992 (Netherlands)	Republic of Vietnam Campaign Medal
Badge	Senior Parachutist Badge		

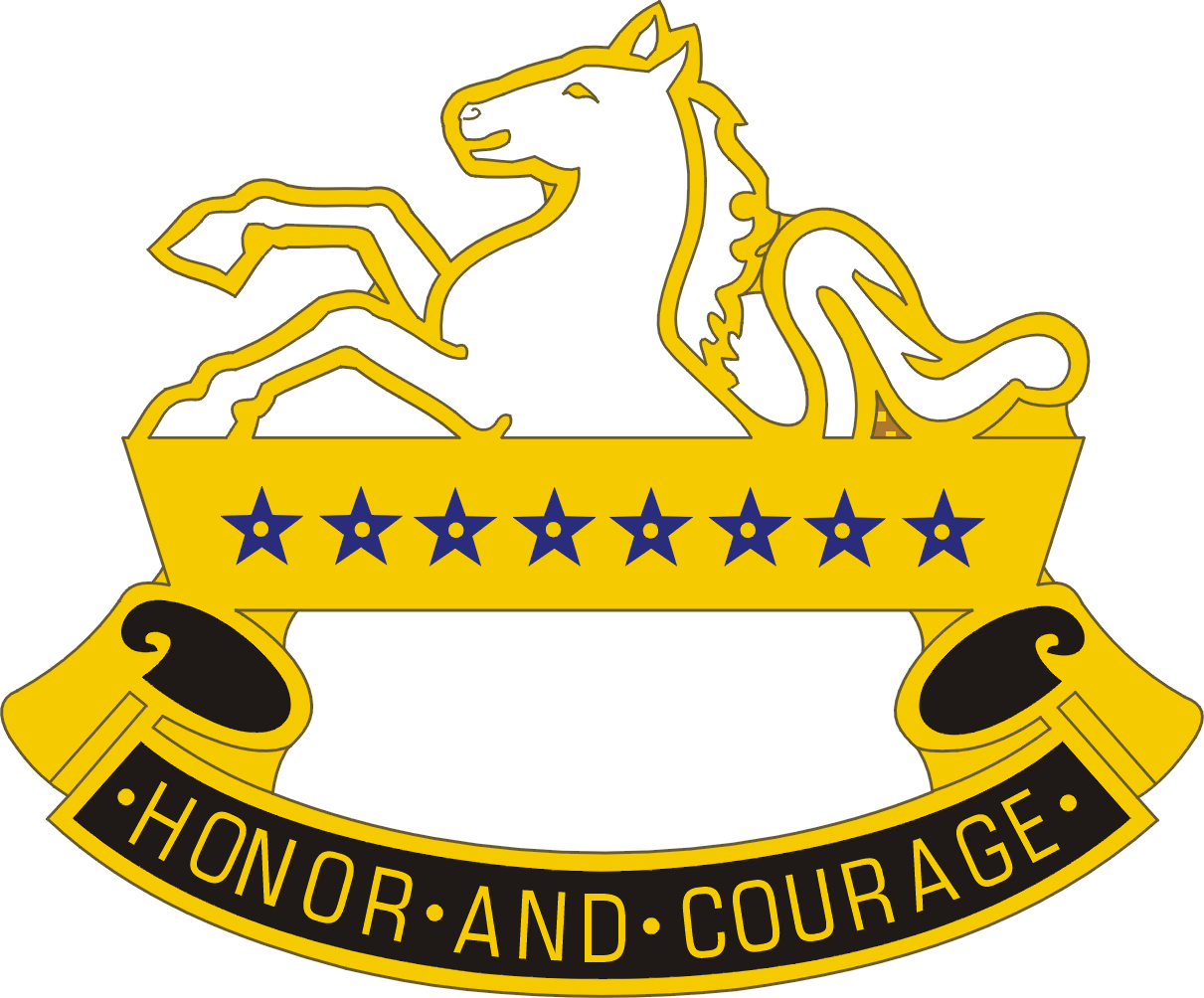
- 8th Cavalry Regiment Distinctive Unit Insignia

== Bibliography ==
- Galvin, John (1969). Air Assault: the Development of Airmobile.
- Galvin, John (1976). Three Men of Boston. Brassey's. ISBN 1574881116.
- Galvin, John (2006). The Minute Men: The First Fight: Myths and Realities of the American Revolution. Potomac Books. ISBN 1597970700.
- Galvin, John (2015). Fighting the Cold War: A Soldier's Memoir. Lexington, Kentucky: University Press of Kentucky.

== See also ==
- Notable graduates of West Point

Military offices
Preceded by Paul F. Gorman	Commander-in-Chief of the United States Southern Command; 1985–1987	Succeeded by Frederick F. Woerner Jr.
Preceded by Bernard W. Rogers	Supreme Allied Commander Europe; Commander-in-Chief of the United States European Command; 1987–1992	Succeeded by John Shalikashvili
