= Sean Swindell =

U.S. Army general

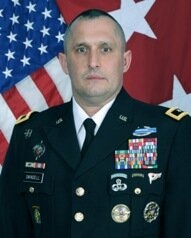
- Official portrait, 2016
- Military career
- Allegiance: United States
- Branch: United States Army
- Rank: Major General
- Commands: Special Operations Joint Task Force–Afghanistan; Special Operations Joint Task Force–Bragg
- Conflicts: Gulf War; War in Afghanistan; Iraq War
- Awards: Defense Superior Service Medal; Legion of Merit; Bronze Star Medal

Sean Patrick Swindell is a retired United States Army major general who last served as the Assistant Deputy Chief of Staff for Operations, Plans, and Training from July 2020 to September 2023. He previously served as the Special Assistant to the Director of the Army Staff from September 2019 to July 2020. He was the commander in charge of a bungled airstrike on a Doctors Without Borders hospital in Kunduz, Afghanistan, that left 42 civilians dead in 2015.

Military offices
Preceded by Edward M. Reeder Jr.	Commander of the Special Operations Joint Task Force-Afghanistan; 2015–2016	Succeeded by Scott A. Howell
Preceded by Christopher K. Haas	Director of Force Structure, Requirements, Resources and Strategic Assessment of the United States Special Operations Command; 2016–2019	Succeeded by Sean M. Farrell
Preceded by ???	Special Assistant to the Director of the Army Staff; 2019–2020	Succeeded by Christopher Sharpsten
Preceded by Paul T. Calvert	Assistant Deputy Chief of Staff for Operations, Plans, and Training of the United States Army; 2020–2023	Succeeded by Joseph A. Ryan
