= Paul Gorman (general) =

United States Army general (1927–2026)

Paul F. Gorman
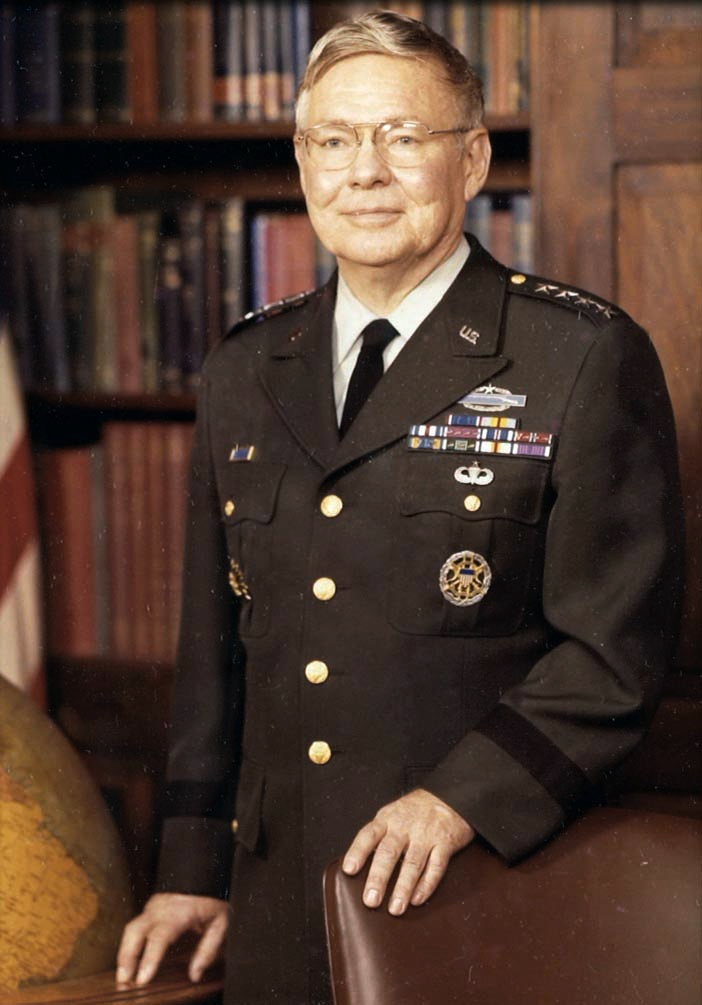
- General Paul Francis Gorman, United States Army
- Born: Paul Francis Gorman; 25 August 1927; Syracuse, New York, U.S.
- Died: 19 January 2026 (aged 98); Louisa, Virginia, U.S.
- Education: United States Military Academy; Harvard University (MPA)
- Military career
- Allegiance: United States
- Branch: United States Navy; United States Army
- Service years: 1945–1946 (Navy); 1950–1985 (Army)
- Rank: General
- Service number: 0-62379
- Unit: Infantry Branch
- Commands: United States Southern Command; 8th Infantry Division; Brigade, 101st Airborne Division; 1st Battalion, 26th Infantry Regiment
- Conflicts: World War II; Korean War; Vietnam War
- Awards: Distinguished Service Cross; Silver Star; Legion of Merit; Distinguished Flying Cross; Bronze Star; Air Medal; Army Commendation Medal; Purple Heart; Combat Infantryman Badge

Paul Francis Gorman Jr. (25 August 1927 – 19 January 2026) was an American general who last served as Commander-in-Chief of the United States Southern Command, in Panama, from 1983 to 1985.

Gorman was born in Syracuse, New York. He enlisted in the United States Navy during World War II before attending the United States Military Academy, where he graduated in 1950. Gorman later obtained a master's degree from Harvard University in 1954. He became a decorated combat veteran of the Korean War and the Vietnam War, where his awards included the Silver Star, the Distinguished Flying Cross, the Bronze Star with valor, and the Purple Heart. He was a military attaché in the American delegation at the Paris Peace Talks, from 1968 to 1970. His notable commands included the 1st Battalion, 26th Infantry Regiment, in South Vietnam in the 1960s, and the 8th Infantry Division in West Germany in the 1970s. He was also an assistant to the chairman of the Joint Chiefs of Staff from 1981 to 1983.

== Early life, family, and education ==
Paul Francis Gorman Jr. was born in Syracuse, New York, on 25 August 1927. He served in the United States Navy as an enlisted sailor during World War II before attending the United States Military Academy at West Point, New York. Gorman graduated from West Point in 1950 and was commissioned as a United States Army Infantry officer. He received a Master of Public Administration degree from Harvard University in 1954.

His further military education included the United States Army Command and General Staff College in 1962, and the United States Naval War College in 1966. He was married to Ruth Marie (Kennedy) Gorman, and they had three children.

== Army career ==
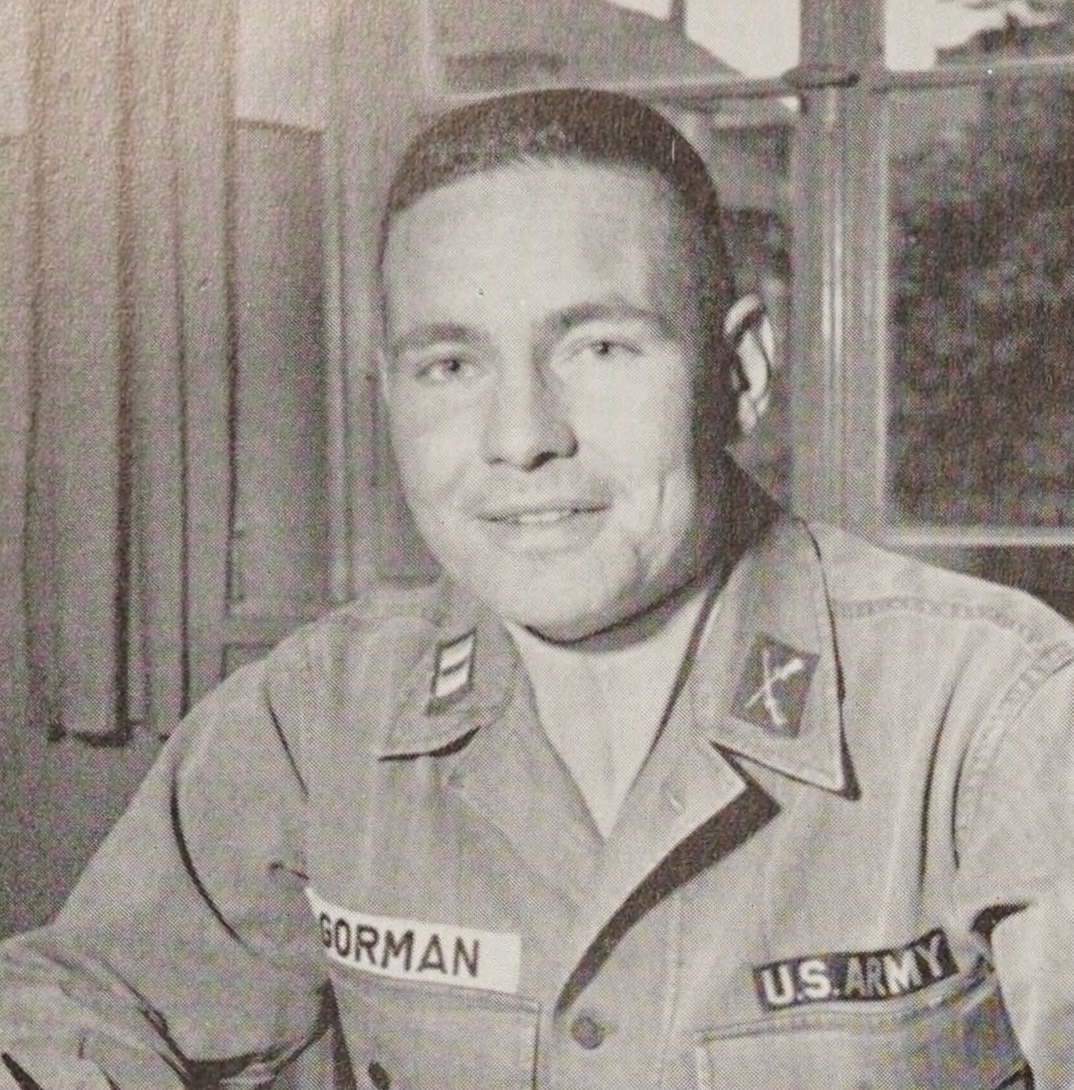
Gorman as Commanding Officer of Company D, 51st Infantry Regiment c. 1959

Gorman served in the 325th Airborne Infantry Regiment and the 508th Infantry Regiment from 1950 to 1951. He was then deployed for the Korean War with the 32nd Infantry Regiment, 7th Infantry Division, from 1952 to 1953. Gorman received several awards during his combat service in Korea, including the Silver Star Medal, two Bronze Star Medals with valor, and the Purple Heart. After attending Harvard University and obtaining a master's degree in 1954, he worked in the department of social sciences until 1957, and then attended the United States Marine Corps Schools at Quantico, Virginia, until 1958. From 1959 to 1961, he served in the 54th Infantry Regiment.

After the Command and General Staff College, from 1962 to 1965 Gorman served in the Office of the Deputy Chief of Staff of the Army for Operations. After the Naval War College, in 1966 he became the commander of the 1st Battalion, 26th Infantry Regiment, 1st Infantry Division, deployed for the Vietnam War. During his combat service in Vietnam, Gorman received several awards, including Distinguished Service Cross and the Distinguished Flying Cross. He was involved in the Paris Peace Talks as a military attaché in the United States delegation from 1968 to 1970, before serving as a brigade commander in the 101st Airborne Division in Vietnam, until 1971.

Gorman was then the assistant commandant of the United States Army Infantry School from 1971 to 1972, where, as the chairman of the Combat Arms Training Board, he developed a new concept of performance-oriented training. After serving as assistant commander of the 4th Infantry Division from 1972 to 1973, Gorman became the Deputy Chief of Staff for Training at the Army Training and Doctrine Command (TRADOC). Serving there from 1973 to 1977, he developed training systems that led to the creation of the National Training Center at Fort Irwin. He then served as commanding general of the 8th Infantry Division in West Germany from 1977 to 1979. Gorman had the troops there conduct training exercises based on his experience at TRADOC.

From 1979 to 1980, he served in the Office of the Director of the Central Intelligence Agency. After that, he was assigned to the strategy, plans, and policies (J5) directorate of the Joint Staff until 1981. Gorman then served as assistant to the chairman of the Joint Chiefs of Staff from 1981 to 1983. His final assignment was as Commander-in-Chief of the United States Southern Command in Panama, from 1983 to 1985.

== Later work ==
Gorman retired with his wife Ruth to their farm, Cardinal Point, in Afton, Virginia, and began raising cattle and wine grapes. He also worked as a consultant for the Institute for Defense Analyses and the Defense Science Board, and served on three White House commissions: the Commission on Organized Crime, the Packard Commission on Defense Management, and the Commission on Long Term Integrated Strategy. Gorman was also an assistant professor for Research in the Department of Neurosurgery, University of Virginia's Health Sciences Center, dealing with issues about information technology and health care.

Gorman died at his home in Louisa, Virginia, on 19 January 2026, at the age of 98.

== Military awards ==
Gorman's military decorations include the following:

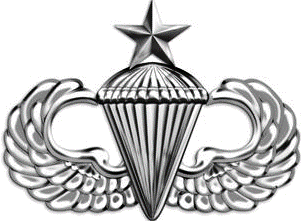

Combat Infantryman Badge 2nd awards
US Army Airborne senior parachutist badge
Distinguished Service Cross	Defense Distinguished Service Medal	Defense Superior Service Medal
Legion of Merit with four oak leaf clusters	Bronze Star Medal with "V" device and three oak leaf clusters	Silver Star Medal
Air Medal with "V" device and Strike/Flight numeral 2	Distinguished Flying Cross	Army Commendation Medal with three bronze oak leaf clusters
Purple Heart	National Defense Service Medal with service star	Korean Service Medal
Vietnam Service Medal	United Nations Service Medal Korea	Republic of Vietnam Campaign Medal
Republic of Korea War Service Medal	U.S. Army and U.S. Air Force; Presidential Unit Citation	Korean Presidential Unit Citation

Military offices
Preceded by Wallace H. Nutting	Commander-in-Chief of the United States Southern Command; 1983–1985	Succeeded by John Galvin
