= Scott A. Howell =

US Air Force lieutenant general

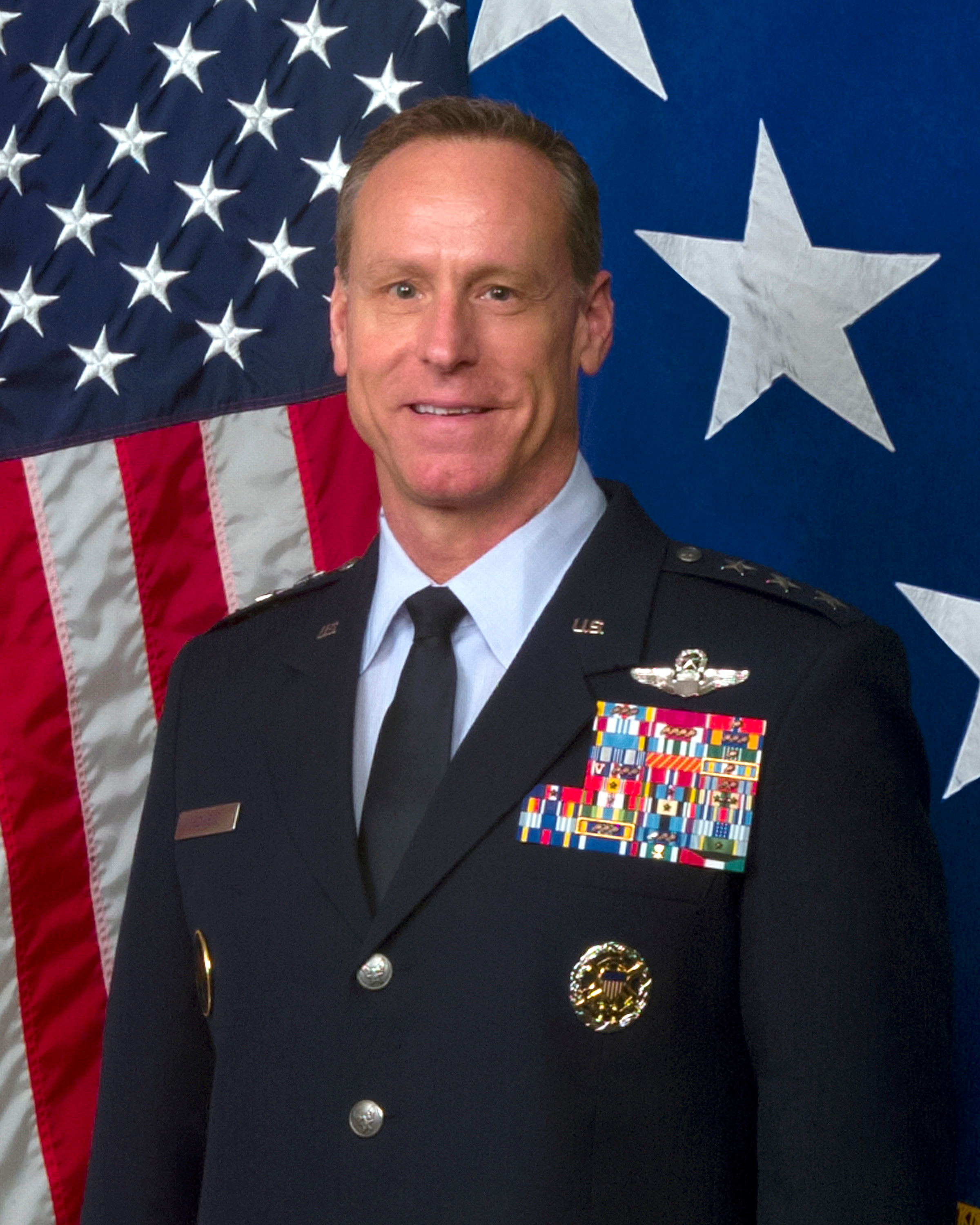
- Born: 1965 (age 60–61); Cadiz, Kentucky, U.S.
- Military career
- Allegiance: United States
- Branch: United States Air Force
- Service years: 1987–2021
- Rank: Lieutenant General
- Commands: Joint Special Operations Command; NATO Special Operations Component Command – Afghanistan; Aviation Tactics Evaluation Group; 20th Special Operations Squadron
- Conflicts: Gulf War; War in Afghanistan; Iraq War
- Awards: Defense Superior Service Medal (4); Legion of Merit; Bronze Star Medal (2)

Scott Alan Howell (born 1965) is a retired lieutenant general in the United States Air Force, who most recently served as the 15th commander of Joint Special Operations Command (JSOC), at Fort Bragg, North Carolina. He previously served as the vice commander United States Special Operations Command (USSOCOM) in Washington, D.C., where he planned, coordinated, and executed USSOCOM initiatives with the Office of the Secretary of Defense, Joint Staff, military services, and other government agencies.

Howell was commissioned through the United States Air Force Academy in 1987 and earned his wings at Fort Rucker, Alabama. He is a career helicopter pilot with assignments in rescue and special operations, and participated in operations in Iraq, Kuwait, Bosnia, Haiti, Kosovo, Mozambique, Djibouti and Afghanistan. He is a command pilot with 2,600 hours of flight time across six unique air platforms.

Howell has commanded a squadron, group, joint special operations air component, special operations wing and special operations task force. In his most recent command tour, he led all NATO special operations forces in Afghanistan as the commander of NATO Special Operations Component Command-Afghanistan and Special Operations Joint Task Force-Afghanistan. His senior staff positions include service in the Air Staff, Air Force Special Operations Command, United States Special Operations Command and as the deputy director of Special Operations at the Joint Staff.

== Education ==
- 1987 Bachelor of Science in management, U.S. Air Force Academy, Colorado Springs, Colo.
- 1991 Squadron Officer School, Maxwell Air Force Base, Ala.
- 1995 Master of Science in management, Troy State University, Troy, Ala.
- 2000 Air Command and Staff College, by correspondence
- 2002 Air Command and Staff College, Maxwell AFB, Ala.
- 2004 Air War College, by correspondence
- 2008 Master of Science, national security strategy, National War College, Fort Lesley J. McNair, Washington, D.C.

== Assignments ==
1. August 1987 – June 1988, undergraduate helicopter pilot training, Fort Rucker, Ala.
2. June 1988 – December 1989, UH-1N Pilot, Detachment 24, 37th Air Rescue Squadron, Fairchild AFB, Wash.
3. December 1989 – October 1991, UH-1H Exchange Pilot, 2nd Armored Division, 1st Cavalry Division, Fort Hood, Texas
4. October 1991 – December 1991, student, Squadron Officer School, Maxwell AFB, Ala.
5. December 1991 – August 1992, student, MH-53J flying training, 551st Tactical Training Squadron, Kirtland AFB, N.M.
6. August 1992 – June 1997, MH-53 Instructor Pilot and 75th Ranger Regiment Liaison Officer, 20th Special Operations Squadron, Hurlburt Field, Fla.
7. June 1997 – June 2000, MH-53 Flight Examiner, 21st Special Operations Squadron, 352nd Special Operations Group, Royal Air Force Mildenhall, England
8. June 2000 – July 2001, Chief, Senior Officer Matters, Rotary Wing Officer Assignments, Headquarters Air Force Special Operations Command, Directorate of Personnel, Hurlburt Field, Fla.
9. August 2001 – June 2002, student, Air Command and Staff College, Maxwell AFB, Ala.
10. June 2002 – September 2003, Chief, Washington, D.C. Rated, Joint Colonel Assignments, Air Force Senior Leader Management Office, Headquarters U.S. Air Force, the Pentagon, Washington, D.C.
11. September 2003 – August 2004, Assistant Executive Officer, Chief of Staff U.S. Air Force, Headquarters U.S. Air Force, Washington, D.C.
12. August 2004 – June 2005, Operations Officer, 20th Special Operations Squadron, Hurlburt Field, Fla.
13. June 2005 – January 2007, Commander, 20th Special Operations Squadron, Hurlburt Field, Fla.
14. January 2007 – July 2007, Deputy Director, Air, Space and Information Operations Directorate, Headquarters Air Force Special Operations Command, Hurlburt Field, Fla.
15. July 2007 – June 2008, student, National War College, Fort McNair, Washington, D.C.
16. June 2008 – June 2010, Commander, Aviation Tactics Evaluation Group, Fort Bragg, N.C. and Commander, Expeditionary Special Operations Wing – Bravo, Air Force Special Operations Command, Hurlburt Field, Fla.
17. July 2010 – June 2012, Special Assistant to the Commander, U.S. Special Operations Command, MacDill AFB, Fla.
18. June 2012 – April 2013, Deputy Commanding General, Special Operations Joint Task Force-Afghanistan, NATO Special Operations Component Command-Afghanistan, Kabul, Afghanistan
19. May 2013 – July 2015, Deputy Director for Special Operations and Counterterrorism (J37) for the Joint Staff, the Pentagon, Washington, D.C.
20. July 2015 – May 2016, Director of Operations, AFSOC, Hurlburt Field, Fla.
21. June 2016 – May 2017, Commanding General, NATO Special Operations Component Command – Afghanistan, Special Operations Joint Task Force – Afghanistan, Bagram AB, Afghanistan
22. July 2017 – July 2018, Vice Commander, U.S. Special Operations Command Washington Office, Washington, D.C.
23. July 2018 – July 2021, Commanding General, Joint Special Operations Command, Fort Bragg, N.C.

== Flight Information ==
Rating: Command pilot
Flight hours: More than 2,600
Aircraft flown: UH-1N, UH-1H, TH-53, CH-47, MH-6, MH-53 J/M

== Awards and decorations ==
US Air Force Command Pilot Badge
Basic Parachutist Badge
Office of the Joint Chiefs of Staff Identification Badge
United States Special Operations Command Badge

Defense Superior Service Medal with three bronze oak leaf clusters
Legion of Merit with "C" device
Bronze Star Medal with oak leaf cluster
Defense Meritorious Service Medal
Meritorious Service Medal with four oak leaf clusters
Air Medal with three oak leaf clusters
Aerial Achievement Medal
Joint Service Commendation Medal
Army Commendation Medal with oak leaf cluster
Air Force Achievement Medal
Air Force Combat Action Medal
Joint Meritorious Unit Award with oak leaf cluster
Air Force Outstanding Unit Award with Valor device and three oak leaf clusters
Air Force Organizational Excellence Award
Combat Readiness Medal with two oak leaf clusters
National Defense Service Medal with one bronze service star
Armed Forces Expeditionary Medal with service star
Southwest Asia Service Medal with three service stars
Kosovo Campaign Medal with service star
Afghanistan Campaign Medal with service star
Iraq Campaign Medal with service star
Global War on Terrorism Expeditionary Medal
Global War on Terrorism Service Medal
Armed Forces Service Medal
Humanitarian Service Medal
Air Force Overseas Short Tour Service Ribbon
Air Force Overseas Long Tour Service Ribbon
Air Force Expeditionary Service Ribbon with gold frame and three oak leaf clusters
Air Force Longevity Service Award with silver and two bronze oak leaf clusters
Small Arms Expert Marksmanship Ribbon with service star
Air Force Training Ribbon
Ghazi Mir Masjidi Khan Medal
NATO Medal for the former Yugoslavia
Kuwait Liberation Medal (Saudi Arabia)
Kuwait Liberation Medal (Kuwait)

== Effective dates of promotions ==
Rank	Date
Second Lieutenant	May 27, 1987
First Lieutenant	May 27, 1989
Captain	May 27, 1991
Major	November 1, 1998
Lieutenant Colonel	August 1, 2003
Colonel	September 1, 2007
Brigadier General	July 3, 2013
Major General	February 1, 2016
Lieutenant General	August 2, 2017

Military offices
Preceded by ???	Deputy Director for Special Operations and Counter-Terrorism of the Joint Staff; 2013–2015	Succeeded by Michael Kurilla
Preceded by ???	Director of Operations of the Air Force Special Operations Command; 2015–2016	Succeeded by William G. Holt
Preceded by Sean P. Swindell	Commander of the Special Operations Joint Task Force-Afghanistan; 2016–2017	Succeeded by James B. Linder
Preceded by Thomas J. Trask	Vice Commander of the United States Special Operations Command; 2017–2018	Succeeded by James C. Slife
Preceded by Austin S. Miller	Commander of the Joint Special Operations Command; 2018–2021	Succeeded by Bryan P. Fenton
