= Bernard Loeffke =

American military officer (born 1934)

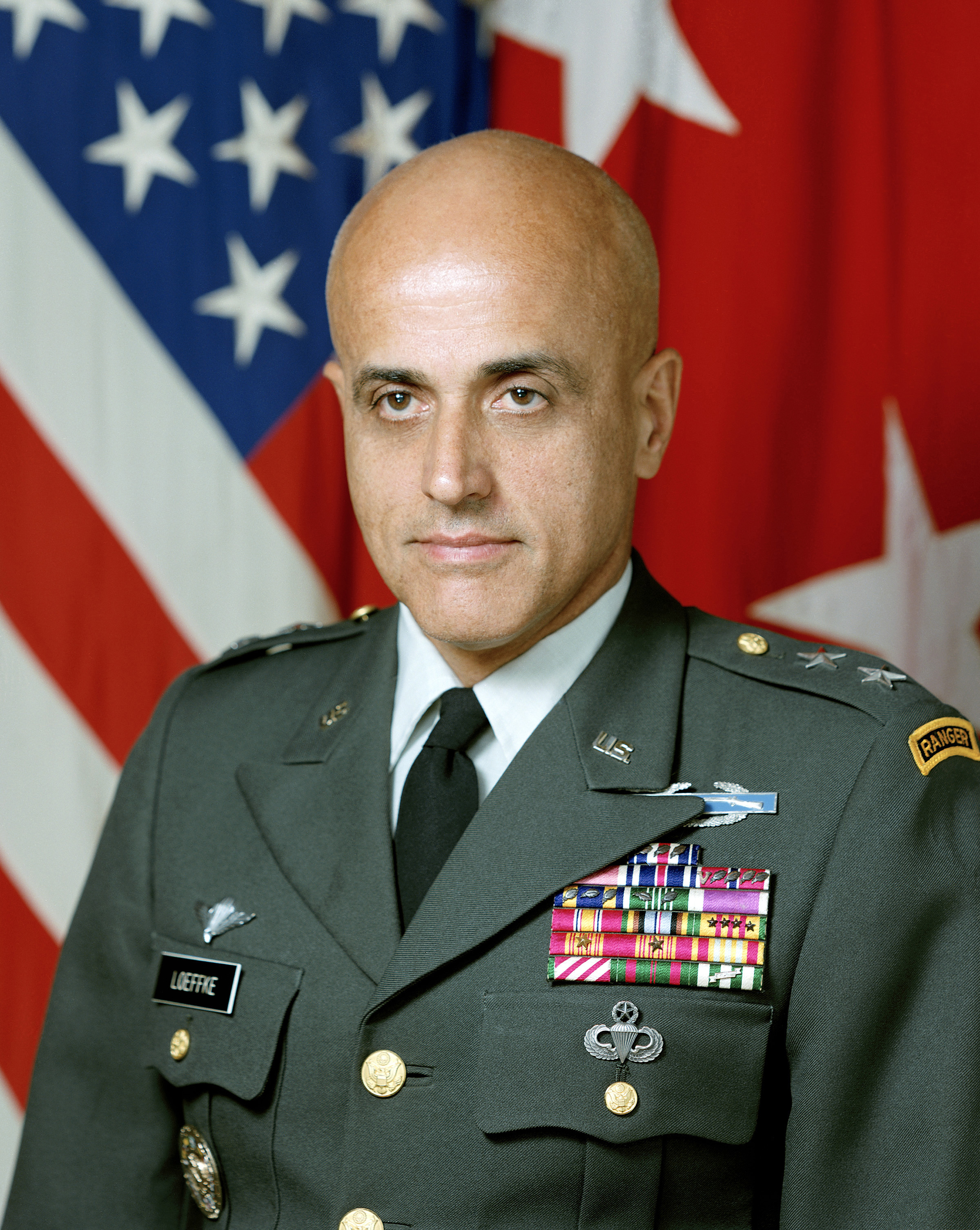
- Official portrait, 1989
- Born: September 17, 1934 (age 92); Barranquilla, Colombia
- Education: United States Military Academy (BS); Middlebury College (MA); University of Miami (PhD)
- Military career
- Allegiance: United States
- Branch: United States Army
- Service years: 1957–1992; 1992–1993
- Rank: Major General
- Nickname: "Burn"
- Commands: Inter-American Defense Board; United States Army South; Joint Task Force–Panama; 1st Brigade, 9th Infantry Division; Strategy and War Plans Division, Army Staff; 1st Battalion, 3rd Infantry Regiment
- Conflicts: Vietnam War
- Awards: Legion of Merit; Silver Star (4); Bronze Star (5)

Bernard Loeffke (born Bernardo Loeffke Arjona; September 17, 1934) is a Colombian-born American retired major general of the United States Army. He graduated from the United States Military Academy in 1957 with a bachelor's degree in engineering. He went on to become an Army Ranger and pilot, and fought in the Vietnam War while leading Infantry and Special Forces units. He later served as commanding general of United States Army South from 1987 to 1989, and as chairman of the Inter-American Defense Board from 1990 to 1992. Loeffke retired from the Army in 1993. He was awarded four Silver Star Medals, the Distinguished Flying Cross, five Bronze Stars (including one with valor), a Purple Heart, and multiple Air Medals.

His education included receiving a master's degree in the Russian language and Soviet studies from Middlebury College in 1965 and a doctorate in international relations from the University of Miami in 1978. He was the army attaché at the US embassy in Moscow in the late 1970s, and in the early 1980s, he was the first American general to serve in the US embassy in Beijing as defense attaché. After leaving the military, he published the book China, Our Enemy?, in 2012, which espouses peaceful relations between the United States and China. Loeffke became a physician assistant in 1997 and has focused on humanitarian work in war-torn countries. He has also taught Russian at the US Military Academy and US foreign policy at Georgetown University.

== Early life and education ==
Bernard "Burn" Loeffke was born as Bernardo Loeffke Arjona on September 17, 1934, in Barranquilla, Colombia, to an American father and a Colombian mother. He was a foreign cadet at the United States Military Academy in West Point, New York, where he graduated in 1957 with a Bachelor of Science degree in engineering. Loeffke became a United States citizen upon graduation. He also obtained a Master of Arts degree in Russian Language and Soviet Area Studies from Middlebury College in 1965, and a Ph.D. in International Relations from the University of Miami. His 1978 doctoral thesis was entitled The Latin American military and Soviet perceptions.

His military education included the Signal Officer Basic Course, the Infantry Officer Advanced Course, the Armed Forces Staff College in 1970, and the United States Army War College in 1973.

== Army career ==
Loeffke was commissioned as an Infantry officer in the United States Army, and his first assignment was as a platoon leader in the 82nd Airborne Division. He later became an Army Ranger and a pilot. Loeffke served in the 77th Special Forces Group from 1958 to 1961. During his three deployments for the Vietnam War, he commanded a Special Forces team in 1959, served as an advisor to a Republic of Vietnam parachute battalion in 1964, and was the executive officer and commander of the 2nd Battalion, 3rd US Infantry Regiment, from 1968 to 1969. He was wounded in Vietnam by Chinese and Vietnamese troops, and received four Silver Stars, five Bronze Stars, and a Purple Heart. From 1965 to 1968, he was an assistant professor of Russian at the US Military Academy.

While serving as a junior officer in Vietnam, Loeffke said he was forever changed by the combat death of one of his soldiers, Sergeant Larry Morford. Morford opposed the war, but explained to Loeffke that even during a time of the draft, when his unit was predominantly draftees, he chose to volunteer to be a soldier because "war is a beastly job and the least beastly of us should be doing it." Loeffke dedicated the Friendship Fund at West Point in Morford's honor to inspire cadets to increase their understanding of Russian and Chinese relations. He likened Morford to Chinese corporal Lei Feng, a national icon in China who symbolizes selfless service. During the war, a total of 34 soldiers died under his command and 200 were wounded.

After the Vietnam War, in 1970 he was selected a White House Fellow and was a staff assistant on the United States National Security Council. In 1973 Loeffke became Director of the President's Commission on White House Fellows. He visited China for the first time in 1973, and befriended the Chinese general Xu Xin, who had been wounded by American fire during the Korean War. He was made the Chief of Strategy and War Plans Division on the Army Operational Staff at the Pentagon in 1974. From 1975 to 1977, he commanded the 1st Brigade, 9th Infantry Division, at Fort Lewis, Washington, before serving as the Army Attaché at the US Embassy in Moscow until 1979. Loeffke was an Army Fellow on the Council on Foreign Relations from 1979 to 1980, then served as a planner on the Army Operational Staff.

Loeffke became the first American general to serve in the US Embassy in Beijing, as defense attache, from 1981 to 1984. He learned to speak Mandarin Chinese during that time. He was also the first foreign soldier to participate in a parachute jump with Chinese airborne troops. His experience in China changed his views about the country, and he began to advocate for the U.S. to treat China as a friend rather than an enemy.

He later served as chief of staff of the XVIII Airborne Corps in 1984, and then as special assistant to the Commander-in-Chief of United States Southern Command from 1985 to 1987. Loeffke took command as commanding general of United States Army South on April 28, 1987. He focused on making Army units a model for Latin American militaries to follow. He spent time in Panama during his tenure, while also serving as commander of Joint Task Force–Panama, and promoted cooperation and joint training with the Panamanian Defense Forces. He and Southern Command chief Frederick F. Woerner Jr. managed growing tensions between American troops and Manuel Noriega's regime. Loeffke relinquished command of Army South in the summer of 1989. Following that, he served as chairman of the Inter-American Defense Board in Washington, D.C., from 1990 to 1992. In that role, he was the military advisor to the Secretary General of the Organization of American States.

== Later work ==
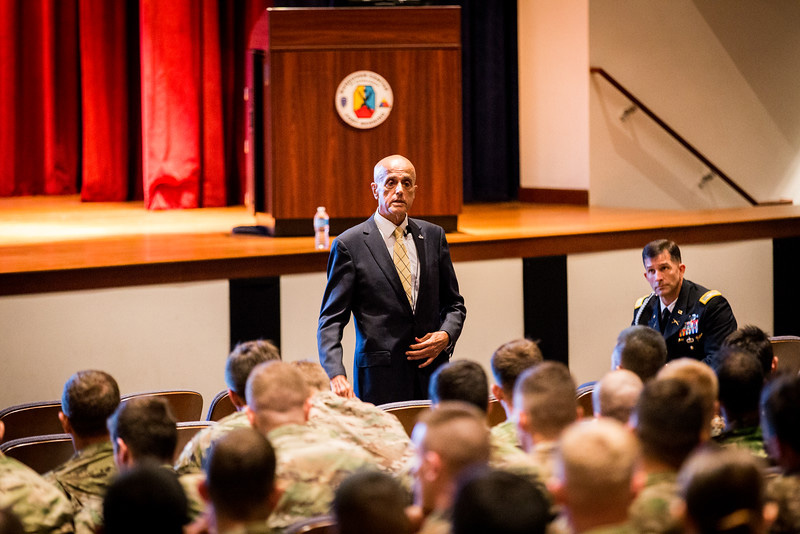
Loeffke giving a speech at Fort Benning in 2016

In 1992, he retired from the military and started his medical career. He was briefly recalled by the Army that same year and was the director of Task Force Russia, which worked to investigate the fate of American POWs and MIA in the Soviet Union. He visited former labor camps in Siberia and reported on his findings to the United States Senate. Loeffke finally retired from military service in 1993. After finishing his studies as a physician assistant in 1997, he participated in medical missions in war-torn or impoverished areas such as Bosnia, Haiti, Kenya, Iraq, Niger, Darfur and the Amazon jungles. In his view, differing nations perceive and value things differently, and one common language that everyone speaks is health; working to improve the health of a population builds lasting friendships and allies, not enemies. He also taught US foreign policy at Georgetown University.

In 2012, he published the book China, Our Enemy?, which recounts his 40 years of experiences with China and espouses peaceful relations between the two countries. In 2026, Chengdu Radio & Television visited Loeffke while making a documentary focused on his life and his efforts to promote cooperation between the US and China, called Hope for the Future: Bernard Loeffke.

== Awards and decorations ==
His military awards included four Silver Stars, a Legion of Merit, the Distinguished Flying Cross, five Bronze Stars (including one with valor), several Air Medals, the Army Commendation Medal, and a Purple Heart. He also had the Combat Infantryman Badge, Master Parachutist Badge, Pathfinder Badge, and the Ranger Tab. Loeffke also received the Distinguished Graduate Award from the West Point Association of Graduates in 2007.

== Personal life ==
Loeffke is married Francesca Adler. In addition to English, he speaks fluent Spanish, Portuguese, French, and Russian, and has a working knowledge of Chinese. He is a life-long athlete, having been the US Army swimming champion, served on the President's Council on Physical Fitness, and competed in a military decathlon while in Russia and full-length marathons while in China. As a senior, his workouts consisted of 300 sit-ups, 100 push-ups, and at least 40 minutes of cardiovascular exercise.

Military offices
Preceded by	Commanding General of United States Army South; 1987–1989	Succeeded by Marc Cisneros
