= Christopher Sharpsten =

U.S. Army general

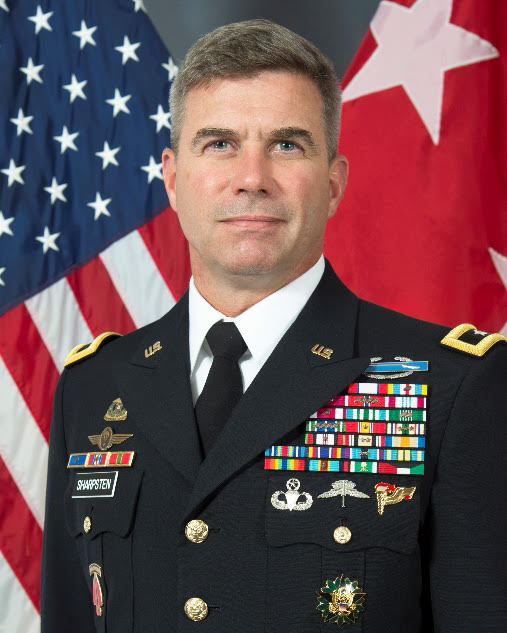
- Official portrait, 2020
- Military career
- Allegiance: United States
- Branch: United States Army
- Service years: 1988–2021
- Rank: Major General
- Commands: 3rd Sustainment Command (Expeditionary); 82nd Sustainment Brigade; 1st Special Forces Operation Detachment-Delta (Airborne) Support Squadron; 540th Quartermaster Company
- Conflicts: Gulf War; War in Afghanistan; Iraq War; Operation Inherent Resolve
- Awards: Army Distinguished Service Medal; Defense Superior Service Medal (2); Legion of Merit (2); Bronze Star Medal (5)

Christopher John Sharpsten is a retired United States Army major general who most recently served as the Deputy Director of Supply, Production and Distribution for the United States Department of Defense COVID-19 prevention and treatment logistics program from July 2020 to July 2021. Previously, he served as the Director of Logistics of the United States Central Command from August 2018 to June 2020.

Sharpsten earned a Bachelor of Science degree in civil engineering from the United States Military Academy in 1988. He later received a Master of Business Administration degree in material and logistics management-operations from the Eli Broad Graduate School of Management at Michigan State University in 1997 and a Master of Science degree in national security strategy from the National War College in 2010.

Listed as Special Assistant to the Director of the Army Staff on the roster of Army general officers from 2020 to 2021, Sharpsten was in fact serving as deputy director of supply, production and distribution for the Department of Defense COVID-19 prevention and treatment logistics program led by General Gustave F. Perna.

Military offices
Preceded by Flem Walker	Commanding General of the 3rd Sustainment Command (Expeditionary); 2015–2017	Succeeded by Christopher O. Mohan
Preceded by ???	Director of Logistics of the Combined Joint Task Force – Operation Inherent Resolve; 2017–2018	Succeeded by Susan E. Henderson
Preceded by ???	Director of Logistics of the United States Central Command; 2018–2020	Succeeded by Jeffrey W. Drushal
Preceded by Sean P. Swindell	Special Assistant to the Director of the Army Staff; 2020–2021	Succeeded by Michael Eastman
