= John P. Sullivan (general) =

U.S. Army general

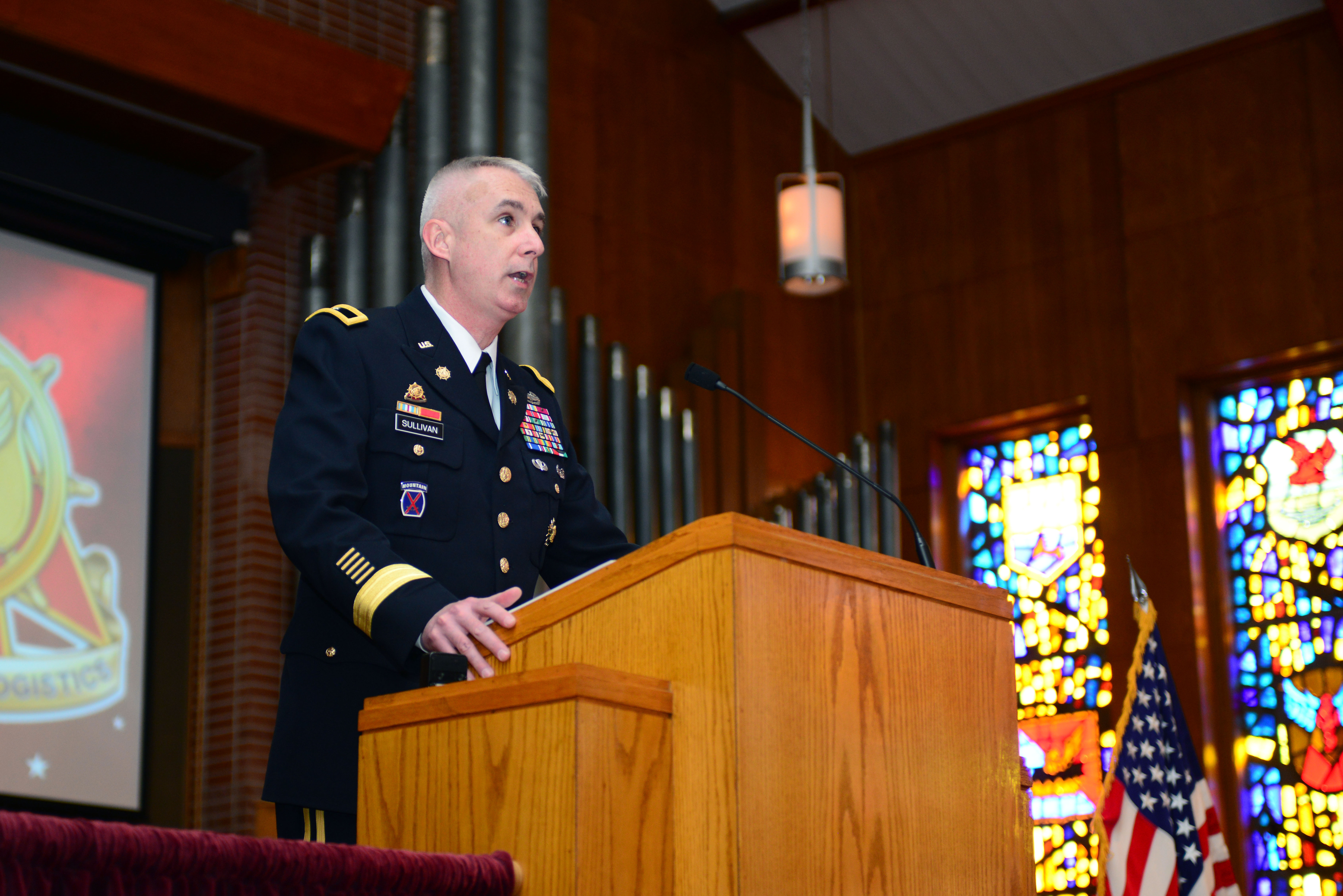
- Born: 1962 (age 63–64); Boston, Massachusetts, U.S.
- Military career
- Allegiance: United States
- Branch: United States Army
- Rank: Lieutenant general (United States)
- Commands: 1st Sustainment Command (Theater); 19th Sustainment Command (Expeditionary); United States Army Transportation School
- Conflicts: Gulf War; War in Afghanistan; Iraq War
- Awards: Army Distinguished Service Medal; Defense Superior Service Medal; Legion of Merit (2); Bronze Star Medal

John P. Sullivan is an active United States Army lieutenant general served as the deputy commander of the United States Transportation Command from 2022 -2026. He most recently served as the 19th Director of Strategy, Capabilities, Policy, Programs, and Logistics of the United States Transportation Command from August 2021 to June 2022, and was previously the Commanding General of the 1st Sustainment Command (Theater).

Military offices
Preceded by Stephen E. Farmen	Chief of Transportation of the United States Army and Commandant of the United States Army Transportation School; 2013–2015	Succeeded by Michel M. Russell Sr.
Preceded by Stephen E. Farmen	Commanding General of the 19th Sustainment Command (Expeditionary); 2015–2017	Succeeded by Michel M. Russell Sr.
Preceded by Ronald Kirklin	Assistant Deputy Chief of Staff for Logistics of the United States Army; 2017–2019	Succeeded by Michel M. Russell Sr.
Preceded by Flem Walker	Commanding General of the 1st Sustainment Command (Theater); 2019–2021	Succeeded by Michel M. Russell Sr.
Preceded by Michael Wehr	Director of Strategy, Capabilities, Policy, Programs, and Logistics of the United States Transportation Command; 2021–2022	Succeeded by Philip E. Sobeck
Preceded by Dee L. Mewbourne	Deputy Commander of the United States Transportation Command; 2022–2024	Succeeded by Jered Helwig
