= Jered Helwig =

U.S. Army general officer

Lieutenant General Jered Helwig
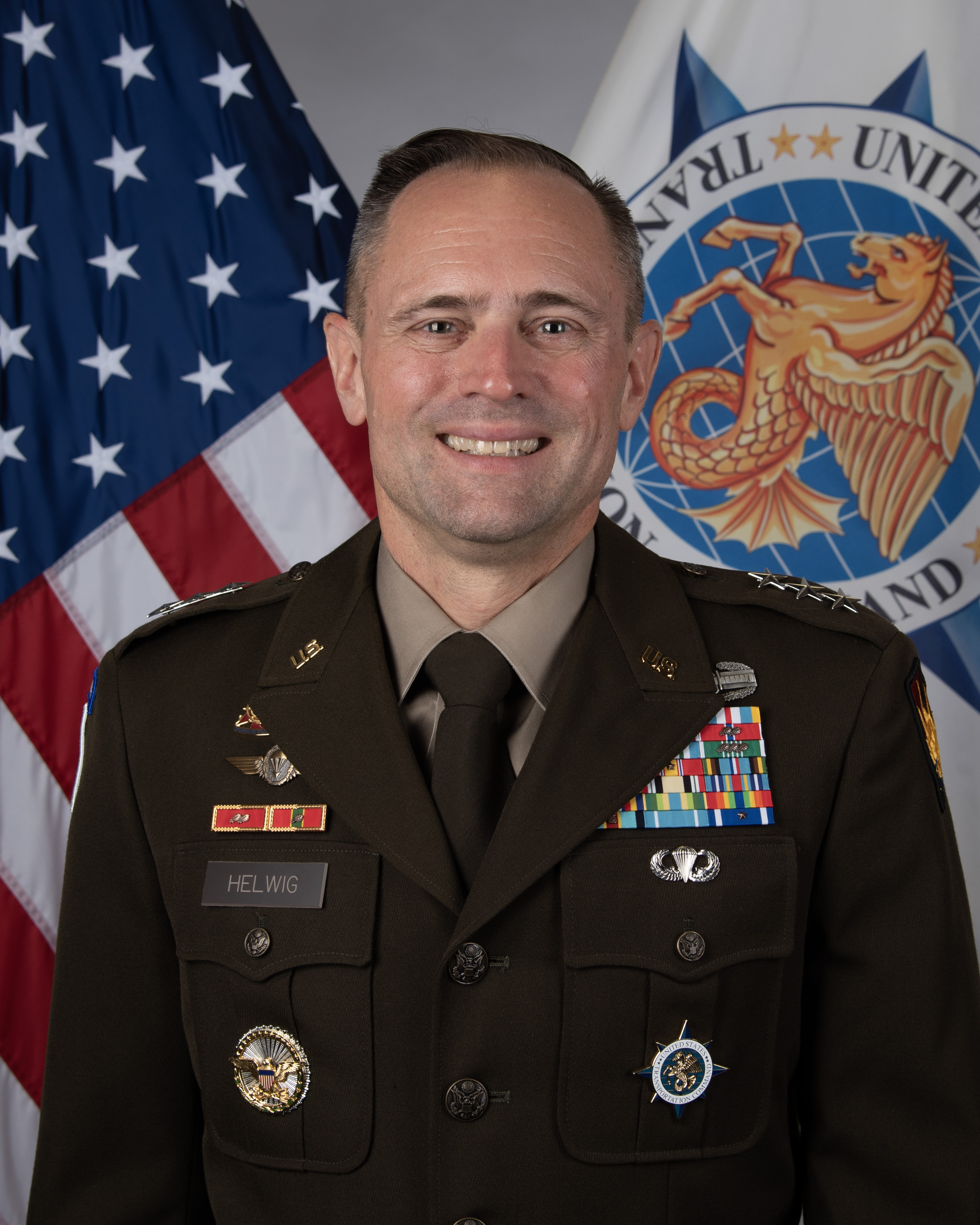
- Official portrait, 2024
- Born: c. 1972 (age 53–54)
- Military career
- Allegiance: United States
- Branch: United States Army
- Service years: 1994–present
- Rank: Lieutenant General
- Commands: 8th Theater Sustainment Command; United States Army Transportation School; 3rd Infantry Division Sustainment Brigade; 710th Brigade Support Battalion, 3rd Brigade Combat Team, 10th Mountain Division
- Awards: Defense Superior Service Medal; Legion of Merit (3); Bronze Star Medal (3)

Jered P. Helwig (born c. 1972) is a United States Army lieutenant general who has served as the deputy commander of United States Transportation Command since July 2024. He most recently served as the commanding general of the 8th Theater Sustainment Command from 2022 to 2024. He previously served as the director for logistics, engineering, and security cooperation of the United States Indo-Pacific Command.

In May 2024, Helwig was nominated for promotion to lieutenant general and assignment as deputy commander of the United States Transportation Command.

Military offices
Preceded by Jeffrey W. Drushal	Chief of Transportation and Commandant of the United States Army Transportation School; 2018–2020	Succeeded by James M. Smith
Preceded by Susan A. Davidson	Director for Logistics, Engineering, and Security Cooperation of the United States Indo-Pacific Command; 2020–2022	Succeeded by Gavin J. Gardner
Preceded by David Wilson	Commanding General of the 8th Theater Sustainment Command; 2022–2024	Succeeded by Gavin J. Gardner
Preceded by John P. Sullivan	Deputy Commander of the United States Transportation Command; 2024–present	Incumbent
