= Michael Wehr =

U.S. Army general

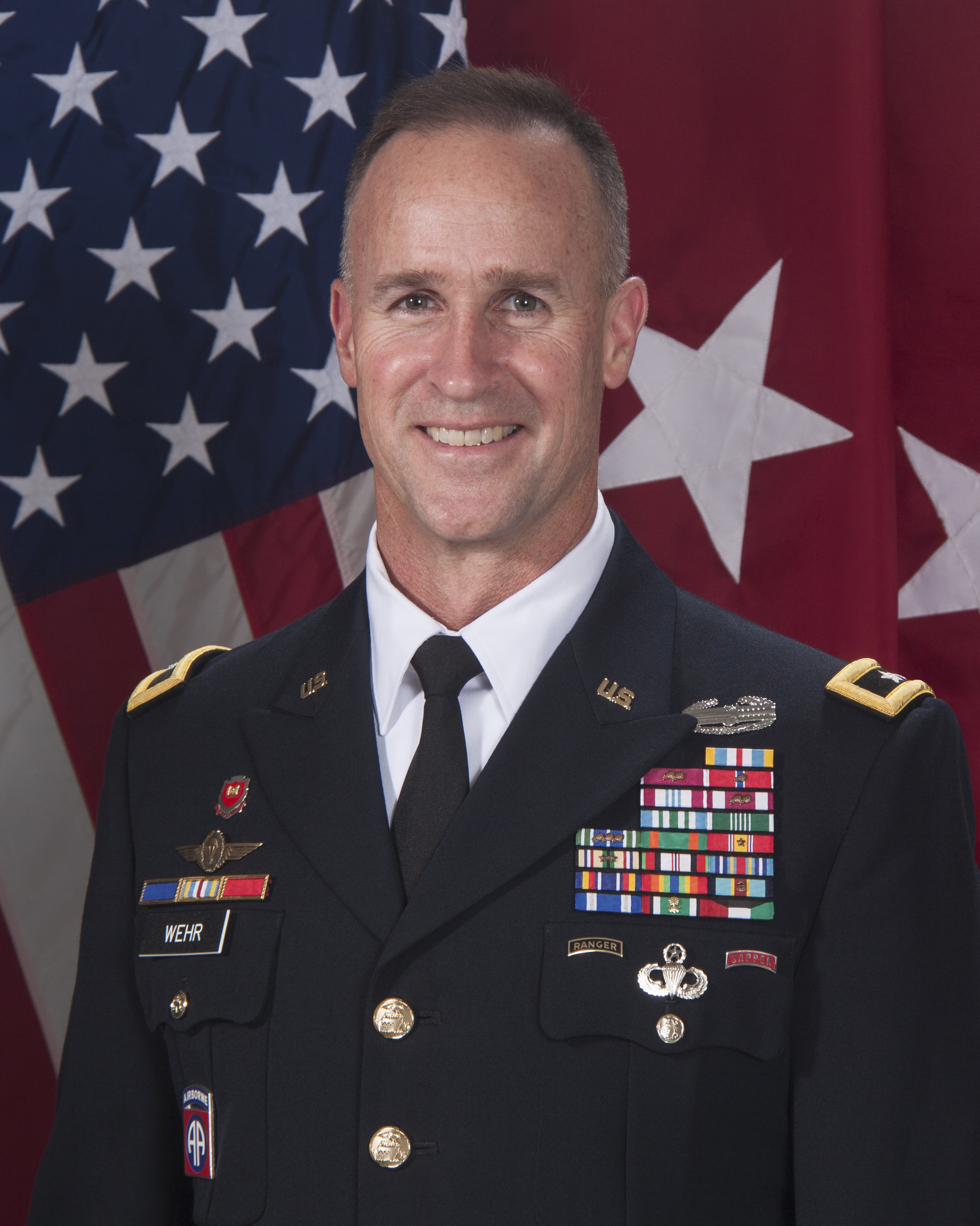
- Military career
- Allegiance: United States
- Branch: United States Army
- Service years: 1985–2021
- Rank: Major General
- Commands: Mississippi Valley Division; South Pacific Division; 307th Engineer Battalion
- Conflicts: Gulf War; War in Afghanistan
- Awards: Army Distinguished Service Medal; Defense Superior Service Medal; Legion of Merit (3); Bronze Star Medal (2)

Michael C. Wehr is a retired United States Army major general who last served as the 18th Director of Strategy, Capabilities, Policy, Programs, and Logistics of the United States Transportation Command. Previously, he served as the Deputy Chief of Engineers and Deputy Commanding General of the United States Army Corps of Engineers.

He graduated from Jesuit High School Sacramento in 1981 with Honors in mathematics. Wehr earned a Bachelor of Science degree in civil engineering from Santa Clara University in 1985 and later received a Master of Science degree in civil engineering from the University of Texas at Austin.

Military offices
Preceded by Peter A. DeLuca	Commanding General of the Mississippi Valley Division; 2014–2017	Succeeded by Richard G. Kaiser
Preceded by Robert D. Carlson	Deputy Chief of Engineers and Deputy Commanding General of the United States Army Corps of Engineers; 2017–2019	Succeeded by Richard G. Kaiser
Preceded by Peter Clarke	Director of Strategy, Capabilities, Policy, Programs, and Logistics of the United States Transportation Command; 2019–2021	Succeeded by John P. Sullivan
