= William L. Thigpen =

Maj. Gen. William L. Thigpen is the former Commanding General of U.S. Army South, headquartered at Fort Sam Houston, Texas.

== Biography ==
Thigpen is a native of Hampton, Virginia, and graduated from Virginia State University in 1991 with a bachelor's degree in Public Administration. He was commissioned an Armor officer in the United States Army from the Trojan Warrior ROTC Battalion.

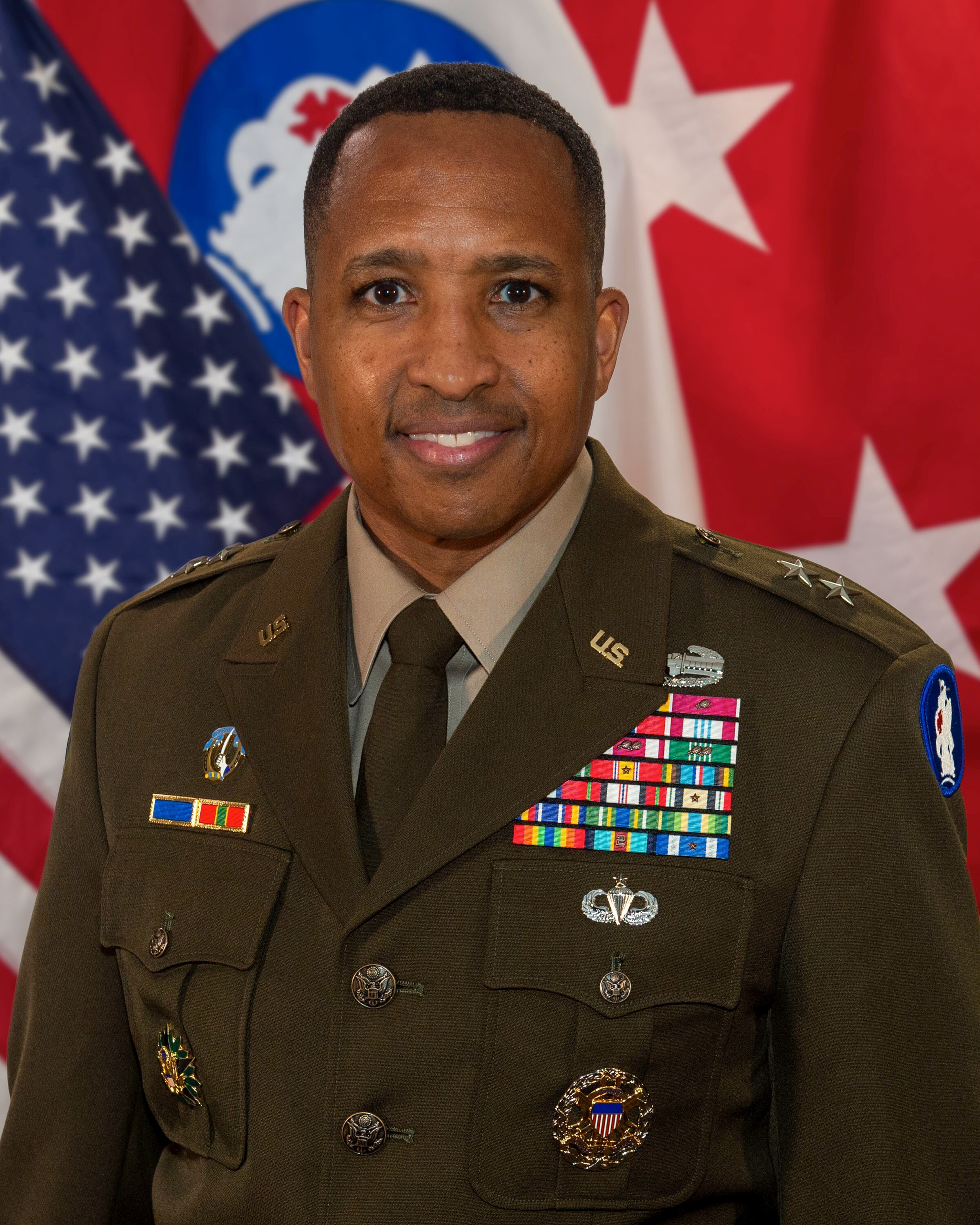
MG William L. Thigpen, CG, US Army South

Prior to assuming command of U.S. Army South, he served as the deputy director for operations, Operations Team Four (OT-4), Joint Staff, J3 National Military Command Center, the Pentagon. Maj. Gen. Thigpen also served as both the Acting Senior Commander for 4th Infantry Division and Fort Carson and Deputy Commanding General for Support.

Maj. Gen. Thigpen is a combat veteran of Iraq and Afghanistan who has commanded at every level from company through brigade. After commanding the 316th Cavalry Brigade at Fort Benning, Georgia, he served at the Center for Strategic and International Studies in Washington, D.C. as a CSA's senior fellow. One of his key staff positions included aide-de-camp to the Vice Chief of Staff of the Army.

Maj. Gen. Thigpen is a graduate of the National War College. He has a master's degree in National Security and Strategic Studies and a second in Business Administration from Embry-Riddle Aeronautical University in 2003.

=== Personal life ===
Thigpen is married and has two children.

== Honours ==
- Order of Military Merit (Brazil, 2022)

== Notes and references ==
This work incorporates material in the public domain in the United States because it is a work of the United States Federal Government under the terms of Title 17, Chapter 1, Section 105 of the US Code.
