= 402nd =

402nd or 402d may refer to:

- 402d Bombardment Squadron, inactive United States Air Force unit
- 402d Fighter Squadron, inactive United States Air Force unit
- 402d Fighter-Day Group, inactive United States Air Force unit
- 402d Maintenance Wing, wing of the United States Air Force based out of Robins Air Force Base, Georgia
- 402nd Field Artillery Brigade (United States), AC/RC/NG unit based at Fort Bliss, Texas
- 402nd Support Brigade (United States), support brigade of the United States Army

== See also ==
- 402 (disambiguation)
