= General Wharton =

General Wharton may refer to:

- Gabriel C. Wharton (1824–1906), Confederate States Army brigadier general
- James Edward Wharton (1894–1944), U.S. Army brigadier general
- John A. Wharton (1828–1865), Confederate States Army major general
- John F. Wharton (general) (born c. 1957), United States Army major general
- Robert Wharton (Philadelphia) (1757–1834), Pennsylvania Militia brigadier general
