= 44th Reconnaissance Squadron =

44th Reconnaissance Squadron

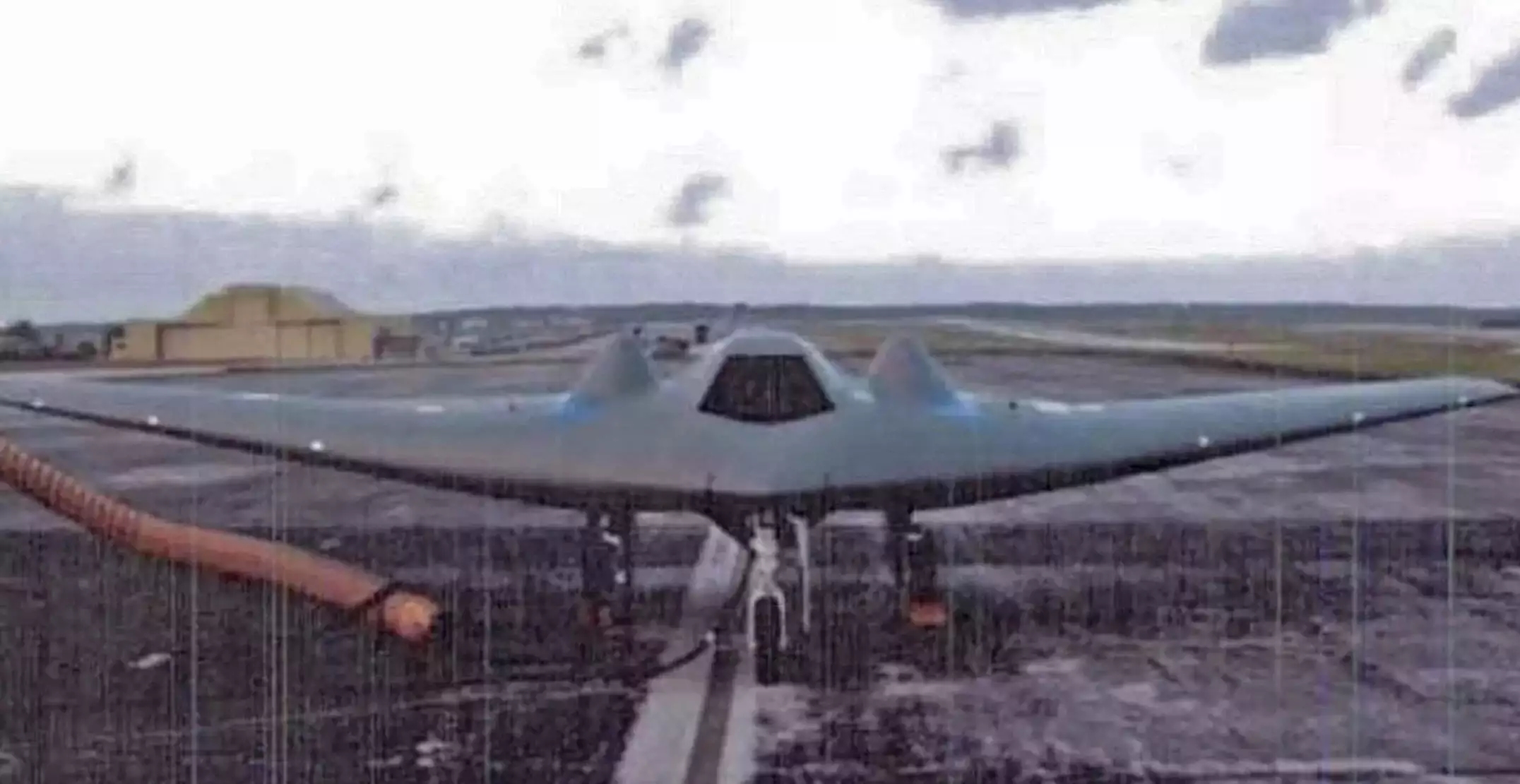
- RQ-170
- Active: 1917–1919; 1922–1927; 1931–1944; 1944–1946; 2015–present
- Country: United States
- Branch: United States Air Force
- Role: Reconnaissance
- Part of: Air Combat Command
- Garrison/HQ: Creech Air Force Base, Nevada
- Engagements: American Theater (World War II) (Antisubmarine); Pacific Theater
- Decorations: Distinguished Unit Citation; Air Force Meritorious Unit Award

Insignia
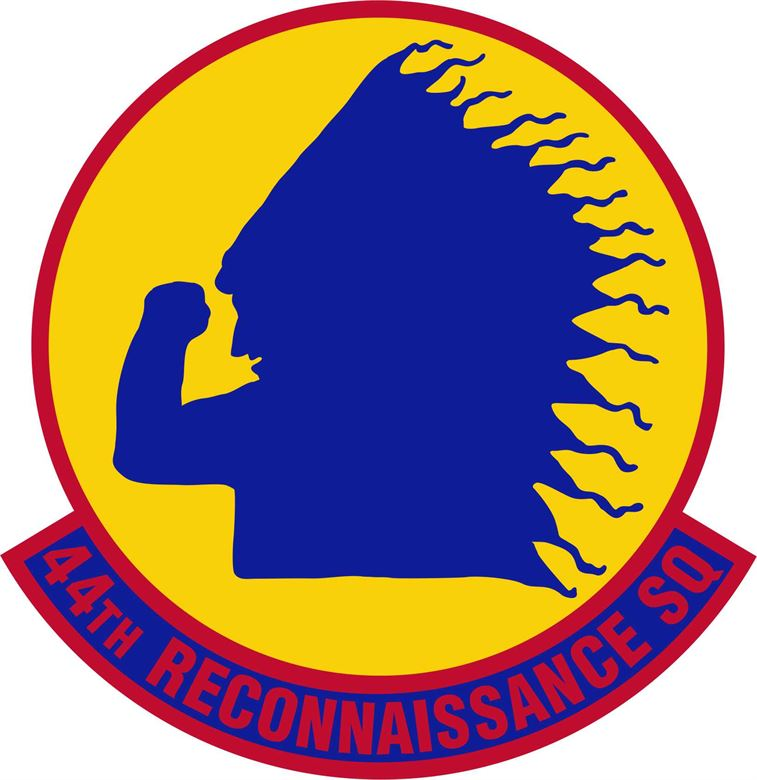
- 44th Reconnaissance Squadron emblem (Note: Approved 20 January 1925. Description: An Indian in war bonnet in silhouette couped at the breast, arm raised, hand shading eyes, in blue on a yellow disc, piped with red.)

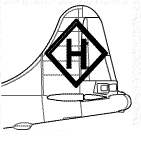
- 430th Bombardment Squadron Tail Marking (Pacific)

The 44th Reconnaissance Squadron is a unit of the United States Air Force's 432nd Wing, Air Combat Command stationed at Creech Air Force Base, Nevada, where it operates unmanned aerial vehicles. The squadron is assigned to the 432nd Operations Group, and has been reported to operate the Lockheed Martin RQ-170 Sentinel.

The first predecessor of the squadron was the 44th Aero Squadron, which was organized in 1917. It served as a training unit until demobilizing in 1919. In 1924, this squadron was consolidated with the 44th Observation Squadron, which conducted aerial reconnaissance for the Field Artillery School. The consolidated squadron was inactivated in 1927.

The squadron was again activated in the Panama Canal Zone in 1931. In 1937, it became the 44th Reconnaissance Squadron, recognizing its mission encompassed longer range missions than battlefield observation. Following the attack on Pearl Harbor, the squadron was involved in the defense of the eastern part of the Caribbean. In April 1942, it became the 430th Bombardment Squadron. Later that year, it returned to the United States and became a training and test unit until inactivating in the spring of 1944.

It was reactivated a few weeks later as a Boeing B-29 Superfortress unit. It saw combat with the 502d Bombardment Group in the closing months of World War II, flying from Northwest Field, Guam and earning a Distinguished Unit Citation. It remained in the Pacific until it was inactivated on 15 April 1946.

== History ==
=== World War I ===
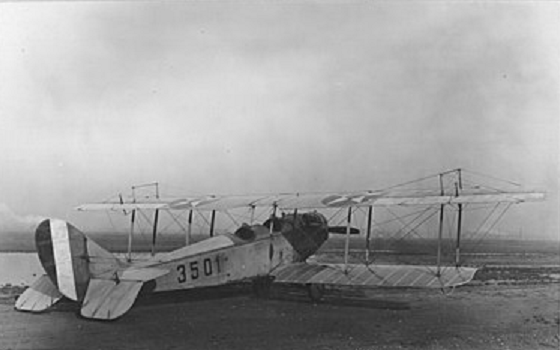
Curtiss JN-4D at Wilbur Wright Field

The first predecessor of the squadron was established as the 44th Aero Squadron at Camp Kelly, Texas in June 1917, shortly after the United States' entry into World War I. The squadron moved to Wilbur Wright Field, Ohio in August apparently serving as a flying training unit with Standard SJ-1, Curtiss JN-4, and possibly Dayton-Wright DH-4 aircraft. When Air Service training units were reorganized as lettered field squadrons in 1918, the squadron became Squadron K (later Squadron P), Wilbur Wright Field, Ohio. The squadron was demobilized in April 1919.

=== Interwar years ===
The second predecessor of the squadron was organized in June 1922 as the 44th Squadron (Observation) at Post Field, Oklahoma within the Eighth Corps Area, where it flew Dayton-Wright DH-4 and evidently Douglas O-2 aircraft conducting training with the Field Artillery School. The two squadrons were consolidated in 1924, with the consolidated unit retaining the name 44th Observation Squadron. In June 1927, the squadron moved to March Field, California, where it was inactivated at the end of July.

The squadron was again activated in the Panama Canal Zone in April 1931. It was initially assigned to the 6th Composite Group, but was assigned or attached to the 16th Pursuit Group from 1932 until 1940. It was the sole reconnaissance unit in the Canal Zone at the time, flying Douglas OA-4 Dolphin amphibians and observation aircraft over both approaches of the canal. The 44th was the first Air Corps unit to occupy Albrook Field after it opened in 1932–33.

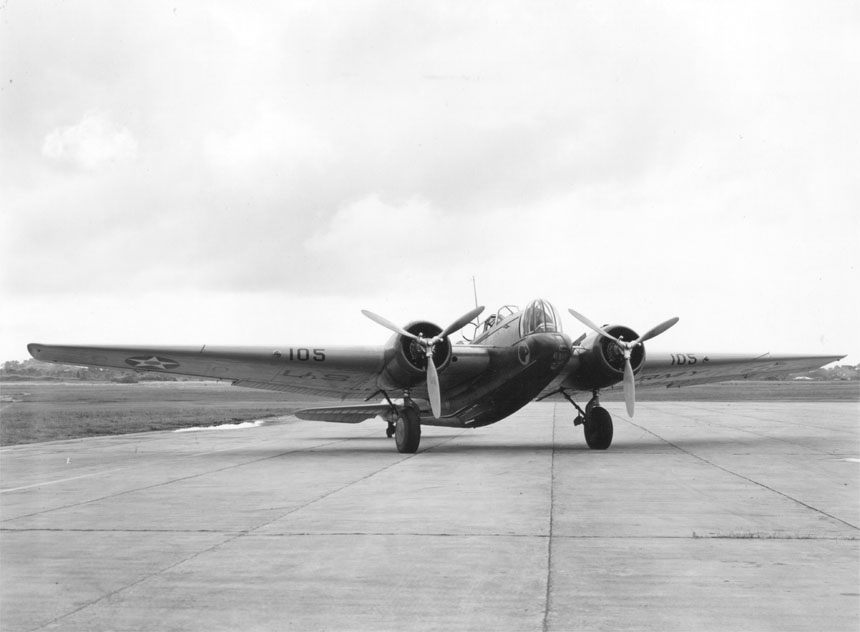
44th Reconnaissance Squadron Martin B-10B

Although it retained its Dolphins until 1939, the squadron began to receive medium bomber Martin B-10s in 1936. Acknowledging its concentration on longer range reconnaissance, it was redesignated the 44th Reconnaissance Squadron the following September. On 20 November 1940, the 9th Bombardment Group moved from the United States to the Canal Zoe, and the 44th was attached to it.

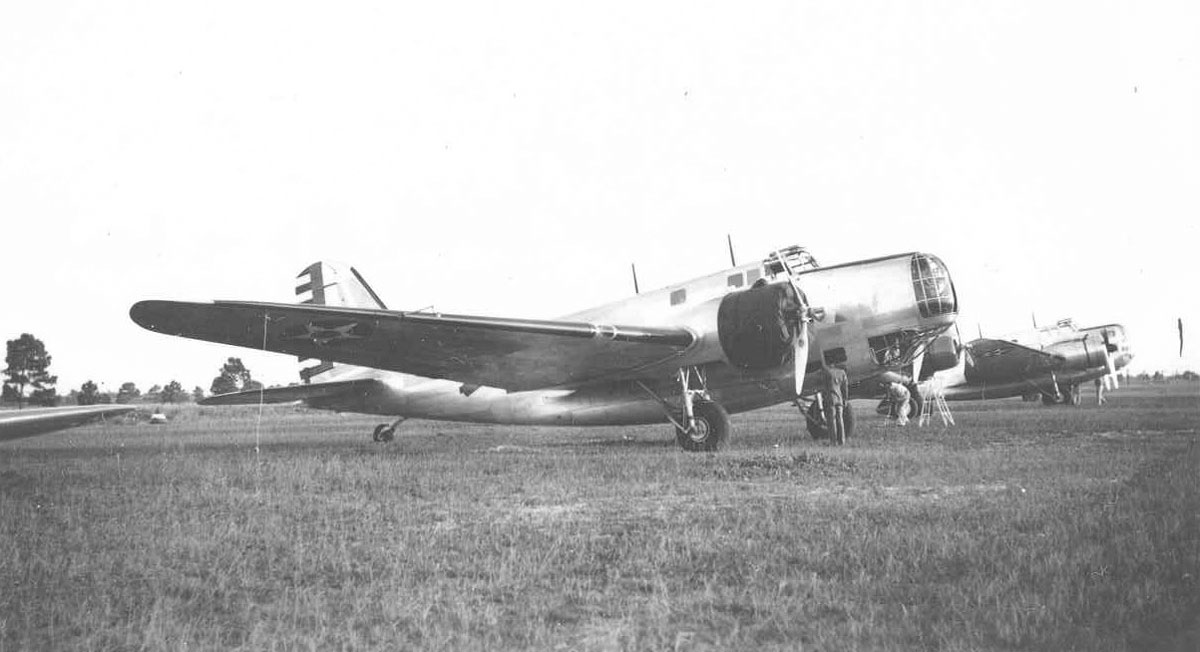
Douglas B-18 parked on a flying field

The squadron was among the first Canal Zone-based units to equip with the Douglas B-18 Bolo, which joined the unit as early as December 1938. The squadron moved from Albrook to Howard Field in July 1941, ending its nine-year stint at Albrook. There, with five B-18s, one B-18A and the B-17B, the squadron commenced long range reconnaissance training in earnest. The squadron's stay at Howard Field was short lived and the squadron departed for Atkinson Field, British Guiana on 27 October 1941, with the air echelon arriving the following day. The ground echelon sailed on the USAT Franklin S. Leisenring and arrived on 4 November.

=== World War II ===
==== Caribbean defense ====
From British Guiana, the squadron operated as an element of the Trinidad Base Command at Atkinson Field. In late 1941, with the coming of war, the unit commenced far-ranging patrols with its remaining three B-18's and, now, two B-18A's. (Note: Conaway, 430th Bombardment Squadron identifies all five B-18s as B-18As and adds one B-17B. Maurer indicates the squadron did not equip with B-17s until 1943. Maurer, Combat Squadrons, pp. 529-530.) The attachment to the 9th Bombardment Group became an assignment on 25 February 1942, and, by mid-February, following an accident to one of its B-18s and severe maintenance problems with the other aircraft, the squadron could count only one B-18A as airworthy and ready for action.

The unit commander also reported that he had "no fully combat trained crews," and, considering that this was the only Air Corps unit at Atkinson at the time, things had deteriorated dangerously. On 22 April 1942, the unit was redesignated the 430th Bombardment Squadron. The squadron continued to fly antisubmarine patrols in the Caribbean until October 1942, when it returned to the United States. This was a move on paper only. The squadron's personnel transferred to the 35th Bombardment Squadron or other units at Atkinson.

==== Test and training unit ====
In October 1942, the 430th returned to the United States, where it was assigned to the Army Air Forces School of Applied Tactics (AAFSAT) at Orlando Army Air Base, Florida. However, the squadron was not manned until March 1943. The squadron was equipped with Boeing B-17 Flying Fortresses, Consolidated B-24 Liberators, North American B-25 Mitchells, and Martin B-26 Marauders (and a Boeing 247, which had been impressed as the C-73) to train cadres of newly formed bombardment units. It also performed operational testing of new equipment.

However, the Army Air Forces (AAF) was finding that standard military units like the 430th, whose manning was based on relatively inflexible tables of organization were proving not well adapted to the training mission. Accordingly, the AAF adopted a more functional system in which each base was organized into a separate numbered unit. The 9th Group and its components moved on paper to Dalhart Army Air Field, Texas on 28 March 1944, and its mission with AAFSAT was assumed by the 906th AAF Base Unit (Bombardment, Heavy) and the 907th AAF Base Unit (Bombardment, Medium and Light).

==== B-29 operations and combat ====
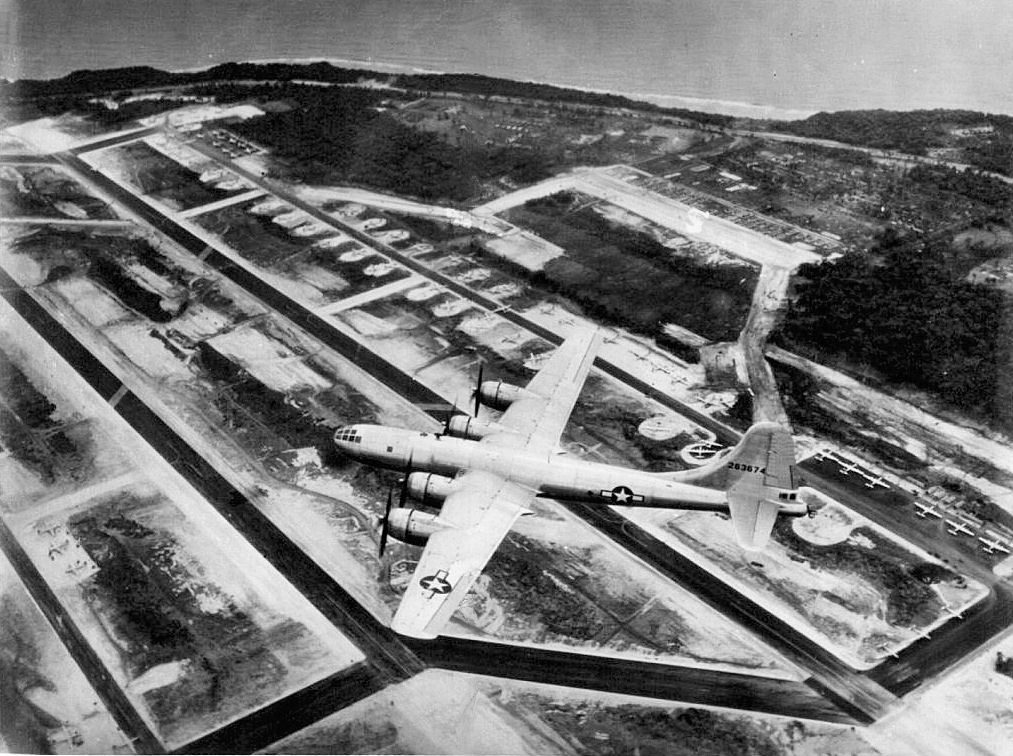
B-29 over Northwest Field

The squadron began to reform as a Boeing B-29 Superfortress unit at Dalhart. However, before the squadron could become fully manned and equipped, the AAF reorganized its B-29 units. Although this reorganization increased the number of aircraft assigned to each squadron and to the group, it reduced the number of squadrons in the group from four to three. The squadron was inactivated in this reorganization on 10 May, and its crews and airplanes were distributed to the other three squadrons of the 9th Group.

A few weeks later, on 1 June 1944, the squadron was activated once again at Davis-Monthan Field as a component of the newly organized 502d Bombardment Group. Five days later, the squadron moved to Dalhart Army Air Field, Texas to begin training with the B-29. The squadron trained at Dalhart and at Grand Island Army Air Field, Nebraska until 7 April 1945, when it departed for the Pacific.

The squadron arrived at its combat station, Northwest Field, Guam on 12 May 1945. It flew its first combat mission on 30 June, an attack on Rota. It carried out attacks on Truk during July. It flew its first mission against the Japanese Home Islands on 15 July, against the oil refinery at Kudamatsu, and until the end of the war, concentrated on attacks on the Japanese petroleum industry. It was awarded a Distinguished Unit Citation for August 1945 attacks on the coal liquefaction plant at Ube, a tank farm at Amagasaki and the Nippon Oil refinery at Tsuchizaki. After the war it participated in show of force missions and evacuated prisoners of war. The squadron remained on Guam until it was inactivated on 15 April 1946.

=== Unmanned vehicle operations ===
The squadron returned to its designation of 44th Reconnaissance Squadron when it was activated at Creech Air Force Base, Nevada on 1 April 2015 to fly unmanned aerial vehicles in the reconnaissance role. It has been reported that the unit operates Lockheed Martin RQ-170 Sentinels.

== Lineage ==
44th Aero Squadron

- Organized as the 44th Aero Squadron on 30 June 1917

Redesignated Squadron K, Wilbur Wright Field, Ohio in October 1918
Redesignated Squadron P, Wilbur Wright Field, Ohio in November 1918
Demobilized on 30 April 1919

- Reconstituted and consolidated with the 44th Observation Squadron as the 44th Observation Squadron on 8 April 1924

44th Reconnaissance Squadron

- Authorized as the 44th Squadron (Observation) on 10 June 1922

Organized on 26 June 1922
Redesignated 44th Observation Squadron on 25 January 1923
Consolidated with Squadron P, Wilbur Wright Field, Ohio on 8 April 1924
Inactivated on 31 July 1927

- Activated on 1 April 1931

Redesignated 44th Reconnaissance Squadron on 1 September 1937
Redesignated 44th Reconnaissance Squadron (Medium Range) on 6 December 1939
Redesignated 44th Reconnaissance Squadron (Heavy) on 20 November 1940
Redesignated 430th Bombardment Squadron (Heavy) on 22 April 1942
Redesignated 430th Bombardment Squadron, Very Heavy on 28 March 1944
Inactivated on 10 May 1944

- Activated on 1 June 1944

Inactivated on 15 April 1946

- Redesignated 44th Reconnaissance Squadron on 19 February 2015

Activated on 1 April 2015.

=== Assignments ===
- Unknown, 1917–1919 (Note: Probably assigned to Post Headquarters, Kelly Field until August 1917, then to Post Headquarters, Wilbur Wright Field.)
- Eighth Corps Area, 26 June 1922 (attached to Field Artillery School, c. August 1922)
- Air Corps Training Center, c. 25 June – 31 July 1927 (Note: Per Bailey. Clay indicates the squadron was assigned to 3d Cavalry Division on 28 February 1927. Clay, p. 1408.)
- 6th Composite Group, 1 April 1931 (attached to 16th Pursuit Group, c. December 1932)
- 16th Pursuit Group, 1 September 1937
- Probably assigned to 19th Wing (later 19th Bombardment Wing), 1 February 1940 (attached to 16th Pursuit Group)
- Probably assigned to Panama Canal Air Force, 20 November 1940 (attached to 9th Bombardment Group)
- Probably assigned to Trinidad Base Command, 4 November 1941 (attached to 9th Bombardment Group)
- 9th Bombardment Group, 25 February 1942 – 10 May 1944
- 502d Bombardment Group, 1 June 1944 – 15 April 1946
- 732nd Operations Group, 1 April 2015 – unknown
- 432nd Operations Group, unknown – present

=== Stations ===
- Camp Kelly (later Kelly Field), Texas, 30 June 1917
- Wilbur Wright Field, Ohio, 25 August 1917 – 30 April 1919
- Post Field, Oklahoma, 26 June 1922
- March Field, California, 25 June – 31 July 1927
- France Field, Panama Canal Zone, 1 April 1931
- Albrook Field, Panama Canal Zone, 13 May 1932
- Howard Field, Panama Canal Zone, 8 July – 27 October 1941
- Atkinson Field, British Guiana, 4 November 1941
- Orlando Army Air Base, Florida, 31 October 1942
- Brooksville Army Air Field, Florida, 6 January 1944
- Orlando Army Air Base, Florida, 25 February 1944
- Dalhart Army Air Field, Texas, 6 March – 10 May 1944
- Davis-Monthan Field, Arizona, 1 June 1944
- Dalhart Army Air Field, Texas, 5 June 1944
- Grand Island Army Air Field, Nebraska, 26 September 1944 – 7 April 1945
- Northwest Field, Guam, 12 May 1945 – 15 April 1946
- Creech Air Force Base, Nevada, 1 April 2015 – present

=== Aircraft ===
- Standard SJ-1, 1917–1919
- Curtiss JN-4, 1917–1919
- Possibly Dayton-Wright DH-4, 1917–1919
- Dayton-Wright DH-4, 1922–1927
- Evidently Douglas O-2, 1922–1927
- Douglas OA-4 Dolphin, 1931–1939
- Thomas-Morse O-19, 1932–1937
- Martin B-10, 1936–1939
- Douglas B-18 Bolo, 1938–1942
- Boeing B-17 Flying Fortress, 1943–1944
- Consolidated B-24 Liberator, 1943–1944
- North American B-25 Mitchell, 1943–1944
- Martin B-26 Marauder, 1943–1944
- Boeing C-73, 1943–1944
- Boeing B-29 Superfortress, 1944–1946
- Lockheed Martin RQ-170 Sentinel, 2015–present

=== Awards and campaigns ===
Award streamer	Award	Dates	Notes
	Presidential Unit Citation	5–15 August 1945	Japan, 430th Bombardment Squadron
	Air Force Meritorious Unit Award	1 June 2017 - 31 May 2018	44th Reconnaissance Squadron

Campaign Streamer	Campaign	Dates	Notes
	Antisubmarine	7 December 1941–31 October 1942	44th Reconnaissance Squadron (later 430th Bombardment Squadron)
	American Theater without inscription	7 December 1941–7 April 1945	44th Reconnaissance Squadron (later 430th Bombardment Squadron)
	Air Offensive, Japan	12 May 1945–2 September 1945	430th Bombardment Squadron
	Western Pacific	12 May 1945–2 September 1945	430th Bombardment Squadron
	Eastern Mandates	30 June 1945–1945	430th Bombardment Squadron (Note: This campaign terminated in April 1944, but credit given for actual combat in the area on later dates.)

== See also ==
- List of American Aero Squadrons
