= 405th Army Field Support Brigade =

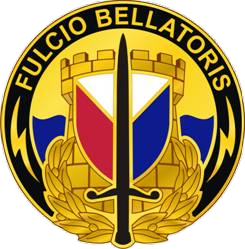
- Distinctive Unit Insignia
- Active: 16 October 2008 - present
- Country: USA
- Allegiance: United States Army Materiel Command
- Branch: United States Army
- Part of: 21st Theater Sustainment Command
- Garrison/HQ: Kaiserslautern, Germany

Insignia
- Current SSI United States Army Materiel Command

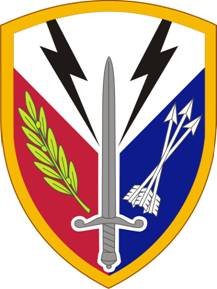
- Former SSI

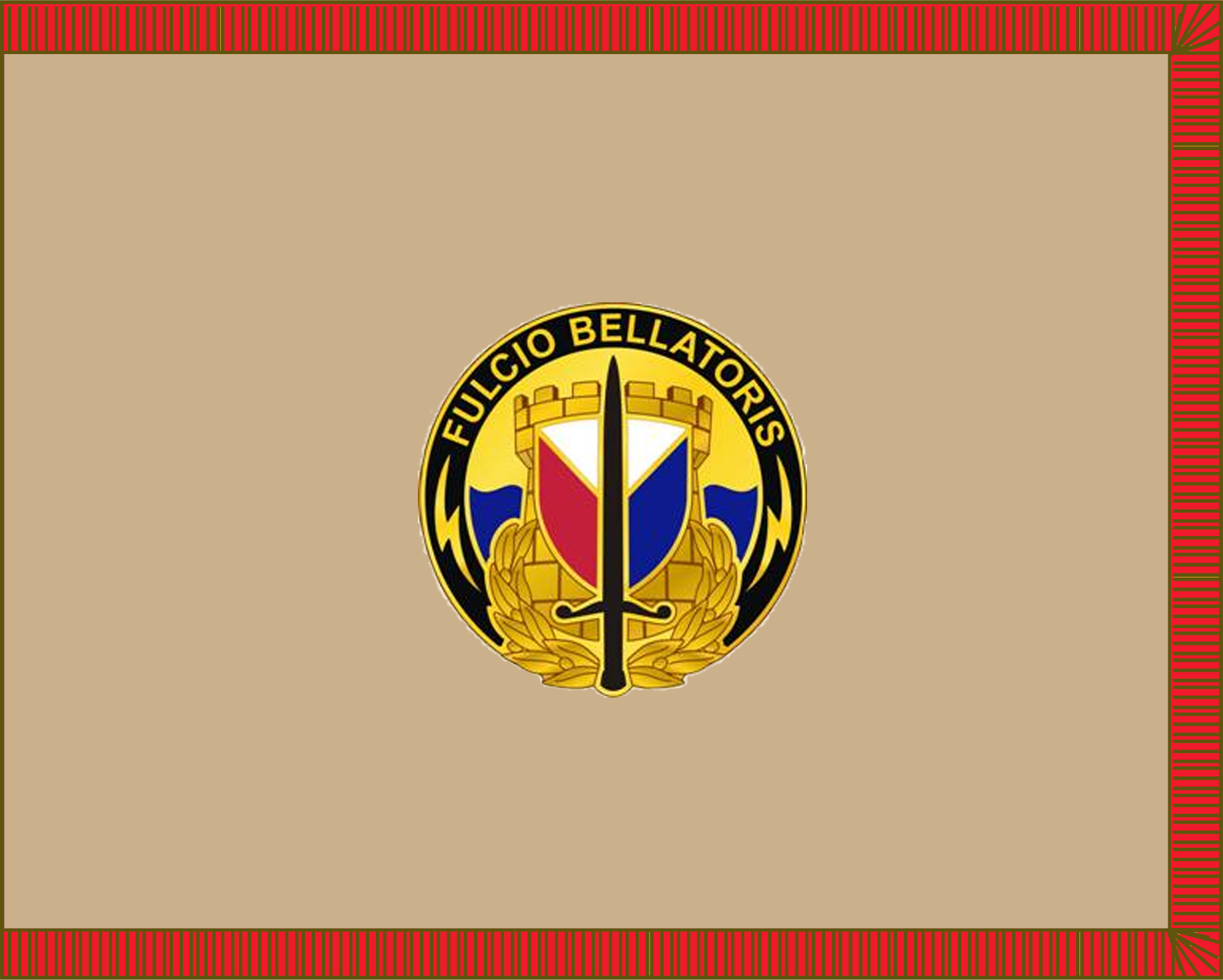
- 405th Army Field Support Brigade Flag

The 405th Army Field Support Brigade (AFSB) is a US Army field support brigade stationed in Kaiserslautern in Germany. The brigade is assigned to the U.S. Army Sustainment Command. The 405th AFSB maintains Army Prepositioned Stocks-2 worksites in Europe and provides APS-2 equipment to units arriving from the continental United States. It also has mission command of eight Logistics Readiness Center and two Base Support Operations units. The brigade provides materiel enterprise support to U.S. forces throughout Europe and Africa – providing theater sustainment logistics; synchronizing acquisition, logistics and technology; and leveraging U.S. Army Materiel Command’s materiel enterprise to support joint forces.

== Organization ==
As of September 2024 the brigade consists of the following units:

- 405th Army Field Support Brigade, in Kaiserslautern (Germany)
  - Army Field Support Battalion-Africa, in Livorno (Italy)
  - Army Field Support Battalion-Benelux, in Eygelshoven (Netherlands)
  - Army Field Support Battalion-Germany, in Vilseck (Germany)
  - Army Field Support Battalion-Poland, in Powidz (Poland)
  - Logistics Readiness Center Ansbach, in Ansbach, Germany (including Illesheim and Katterbach)
  - Logistics Readiness Center Bavaria, in Grafenwöhr, Germany (including Vilseck, Hohenfels, and Garmisch)
  - Logistics Readiness Center Benelux, at Chièvres Air Base, Belgium (including sites in Belgium, Netherlands, and Germany)
  - Logistics Readiness Center Rheinland-Pfalz, in Kaiserslautern, Germany (including Baumholder)
  - Logistics Readiness Center Stuttgart, in Stuttgart, Germany
  - Logistics Readiness Center Poland, in Poznan, Poland (including multiple sites across Poland)
  - Logistics Readiness Center Italy, in Vicenza, Italy (including Livorno)
  - Logistics Readiness Center Wiesbaden, in Wiesbaden, Germany
  - Base Support Operations Transportation, in Kaiserslautern, Germany
  - Base Support Operations Maintenance, in Grafenwöhr, Germany
