= 502d Bombardment Group =

World War II Army Air Forces unit

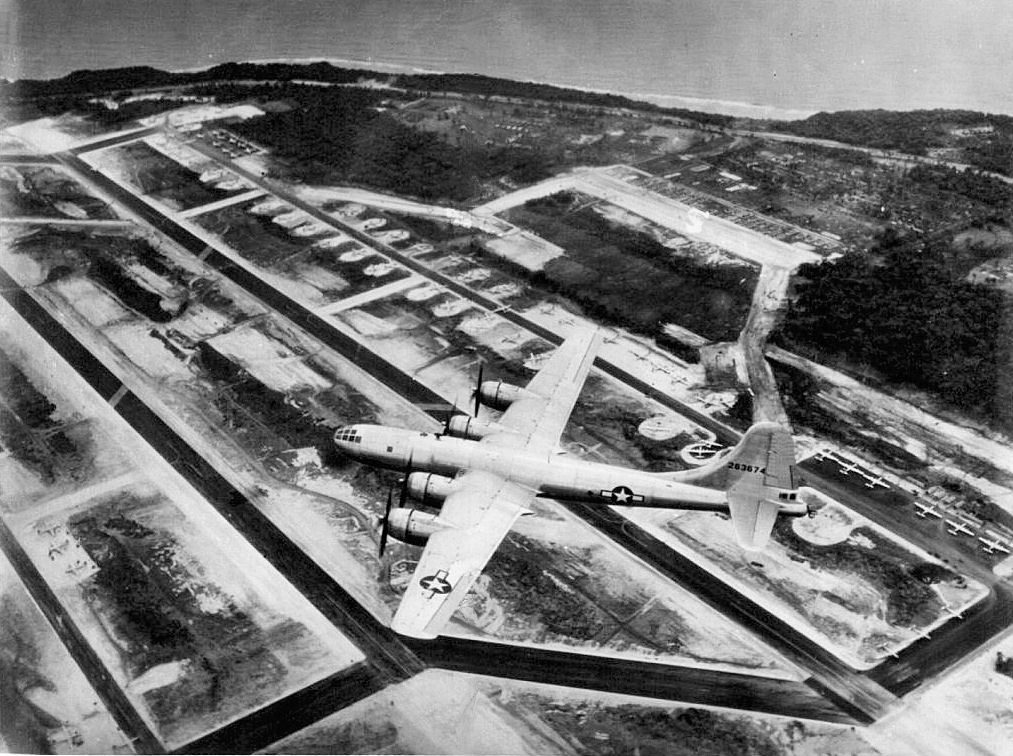
- B-29 Superfortress over Northwest Field
- Active: 1944–1946
- Country: United States
- Branch: United States Air Force
- Role: Strategic bombardment
- Engagements: Pacific Theater
- Decorations: Distinguished Unit Citation

Insignia
- 502d Bombardment Group emblem

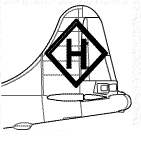
- Tail marking: Diamond H

The 502d Bombardment Group was a World War II Army Air Forces (AAF) strategic bombardment organization. The unit was one of the last few combat groups formed by the AAF, activating on 1 June 1944. After nearly a year training with Boeing B-29 Superfortress, it moved to Guam in April 1945. It flew its first combat mission on 30 June 1945 and its first strike on the Japanese home islands in July. It was awarded the Distinguished Unit Citation for attacks on the Japanese oil industry between 5 August and 15 August 1945. After V-J Day it flew show of force missions and evacuated prisoners of war. It remained in the Pacific until it was inactivated on 15 April 1946.

== History ==
=== Organization and training ===
The group was organized on 1 June 1944 at Davis-Monthan Field, Arizona. Its operational components, the 402d, 411th and 430th Bombardment Squadrons, were all established squadrons that had briefly activated in other groups as Boeing B-29 Superfortress units, but had been inactivated when B-29 groups were reorganized to consist of only three squadrons. Five days later, the group moved without personnel or equipment to Dalhart Army Air Field, Texas. The group was finally manned in July, when 11 officers and 82 enlisted men were reported assigned to the group. At Dalhart, it began to equip and train with B-29s. The group trained at Dalhart and at Grand Island Army Air Field, Nebraska until 7 April 1945, when it departed for the Pacific. The ground echelon departed Grand Island for Fort Lawton and 9 April 1945, and embarked on the SS Cape Newenham on 14 April.

=== Combat in the Pacific and inactivation ===
The 502d was deployed to the Central Pacific Area in late 1944. Upon arrival the group's personnel were engaged in Quonset hut construction. By mid-July most personnel were able to move into the huts from the initial tents which they were assigned on arrival.

The group arrived at its combat station, Northwest Field, Guam on 12 May 1945. It flew its first combat mission on 30 June, an attack on Rota. It carried out attacks on Truk during July. It flew its first mission against the Japanese Home Islands on 15 July, against the oil refinery at Kudamatsu, and until the end of the war, concentrated on attacks on the Japanese petroleum industry. It was awarded a Distinguished Unit Citation for August 1945 attacks on the coal liquefaction plant at Ube, a tank farm at Amagasaki and the Nippon Oil refinery at Tsuchizaki. After the war it participated in show of force missions and evacuated prisoners of war. The squadron remained on Guam until it was inactivated on 15 April 1946.

Due to a shortage of B-29s, the group was equipped with former II Bomber Command B-17 Flying Fortresses previously used for training heavy bomber replacement personnel. The 502d eventually received Atlanta-built B-29B Superfortresses.

After V-J Day, the 502d flew over Japan to evaluate bombardment damage. In the fall of 1945, the group largely demobilized as part of the "Sunset Project", with some aircraft being sent reclamation on Tinian; others being returned to the United States for storage at aircraft depots in the southwest. By Christmas, the group fleet was reduced to 30 or fewer planes and the remaining elements of the group was effectively consolidated into the 501st Bombardment Group. Many of the remaining personnel signed for "any conditions of travel" to get home, arriving three weeks later in Oakland, California, where troop trains scattered them for points of discharge close to their homes.

== Lineage ==
- Constituted as the 502d Bombardment Group, Very Heavy on 25 May 1944

Activated on 1 June 1944
Inactivated on 15 April 1946

=== Assignments ===
- Second Air Force, 1 June 1944 (attached to 17th Bombardment Operational Training Wing after 26 September 1944)
- 315th Bombardment Wing, 12 May 1945 – 15 April 1946 (attached to XXI Bomber Command)

=== Components ===
- 402d Bombardment Squadron: 1 June 1944 – 15 April 1946
- 411th Bombardment Squadron: 1 June 1944 – 15 April 1946
- 430th Bombardment Squadron: 1 June 1944 – 15 April 1946
- 29th Photographic Laboratory Section: 1 June 1944 –

=== Stations ===
- Davis–Monthan Field, Arizona 1 June 1944
- Dalhart Army Air Field, Texas 5 June 1944
- Grand Island Army Air Field, Nebraska 26 September 1944 – 7 April 1945
- Northwest Field, Guam, Mariana Islands, 12 May 1945 – 15 April 1946

=== Aircraft ===
- Boeing B-29 Superfortress, 1944–1946
