= 702nd Tactical Air Support Squadron =

United States Air Force military unit

702d Tactical Air Support Squadron (formerly 402d Bombardment Squadron, 12th Reconnaissance Squadron)
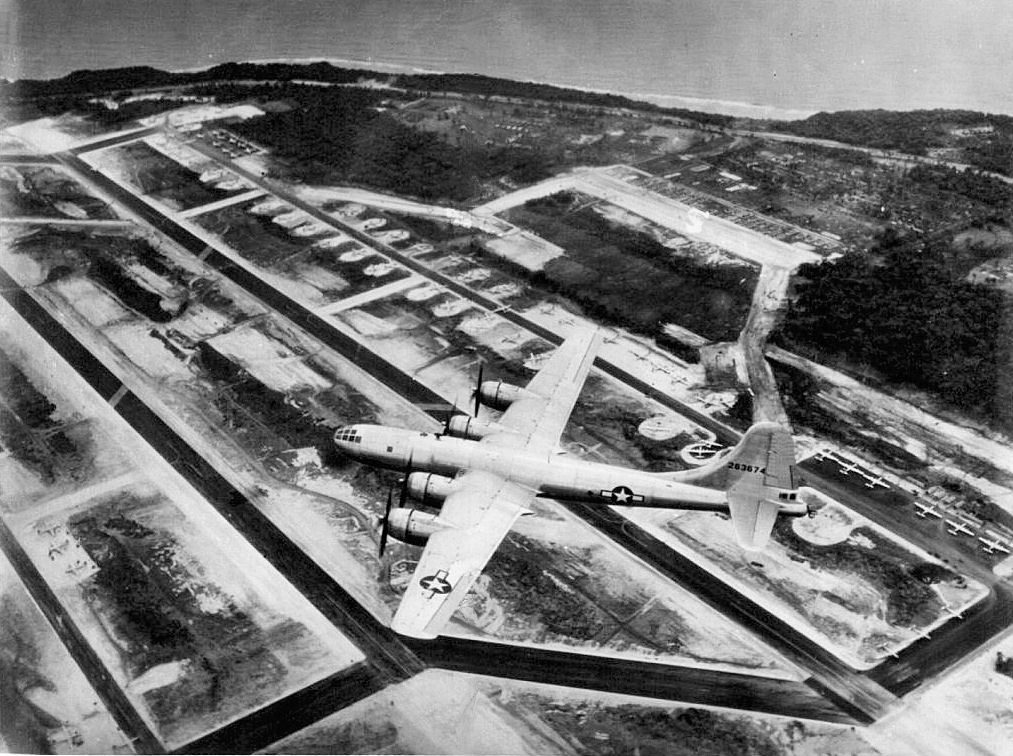
- B-29 Superfortress flying over Northwest Field (Guam)
- Active: 1941-1944, 1944, 1944-1946, 1969-1975
- Country: United States
- Branch: United States Air Force
- Role: Tactical air support
- Engagements: Pacific Theater
- Decorations: Distinguished Unit Citation; Air Force Outstanding Unit Award

Insignia
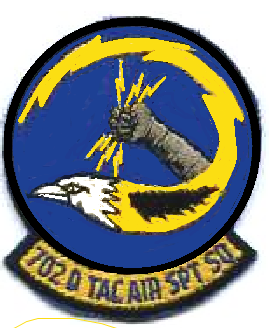
- 702d Tactical Air Support Squadron emblem

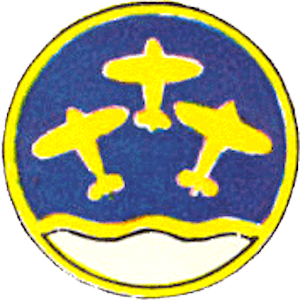
- 12th Reconnaissance Squadron (later 402d Bombardment Squadron) emblem (Note: Approved 23 October 1941. Description: On a disc divided per fess wavy debased blue and white, three gold airplanes radiating from the middle base.)

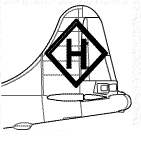
- 402nd Bombardment Squadron Tail Marking (Pacific)

The 702d Tactical Air Support Squadron is an inactive United States Air Force unit. It was part of the 601st Tactical Air Control Wing at Bergstrom Air Force Base, Texas, from 1969 until it was inactivated on 30 November 1975.

The earliest predecessor of the squadron was organized during the expansion of the armed forces of the United States prior to its entry into World War II as the 12th Reconnaissance Squadron. The squadron was redesignated the 402d Bombardment Squadron in the spring of 1942, and became an Operational Training Unit and later a Replacement Training Unit until 1944, when it was inactivated in a reorganization of Army Air Forces training units.

The squadron was reactivated the same day as a Boeing B-29 Superfortress unit, but inactivated shortly thereafter as B-29 units reorganized from four to three squadrons. It was then activated as a component of a different group. It served in combat in the Pacific Theater, where it was awarded the Distinguished Unit Citations for combat in Japan before inactivating in theater on 15 April 1946.

The two squadrons were consolidated into a single unit in September 1985, but the consolidated unit has not been active.

== History ==
=== World War II ===
==== Organization and initial operations ====
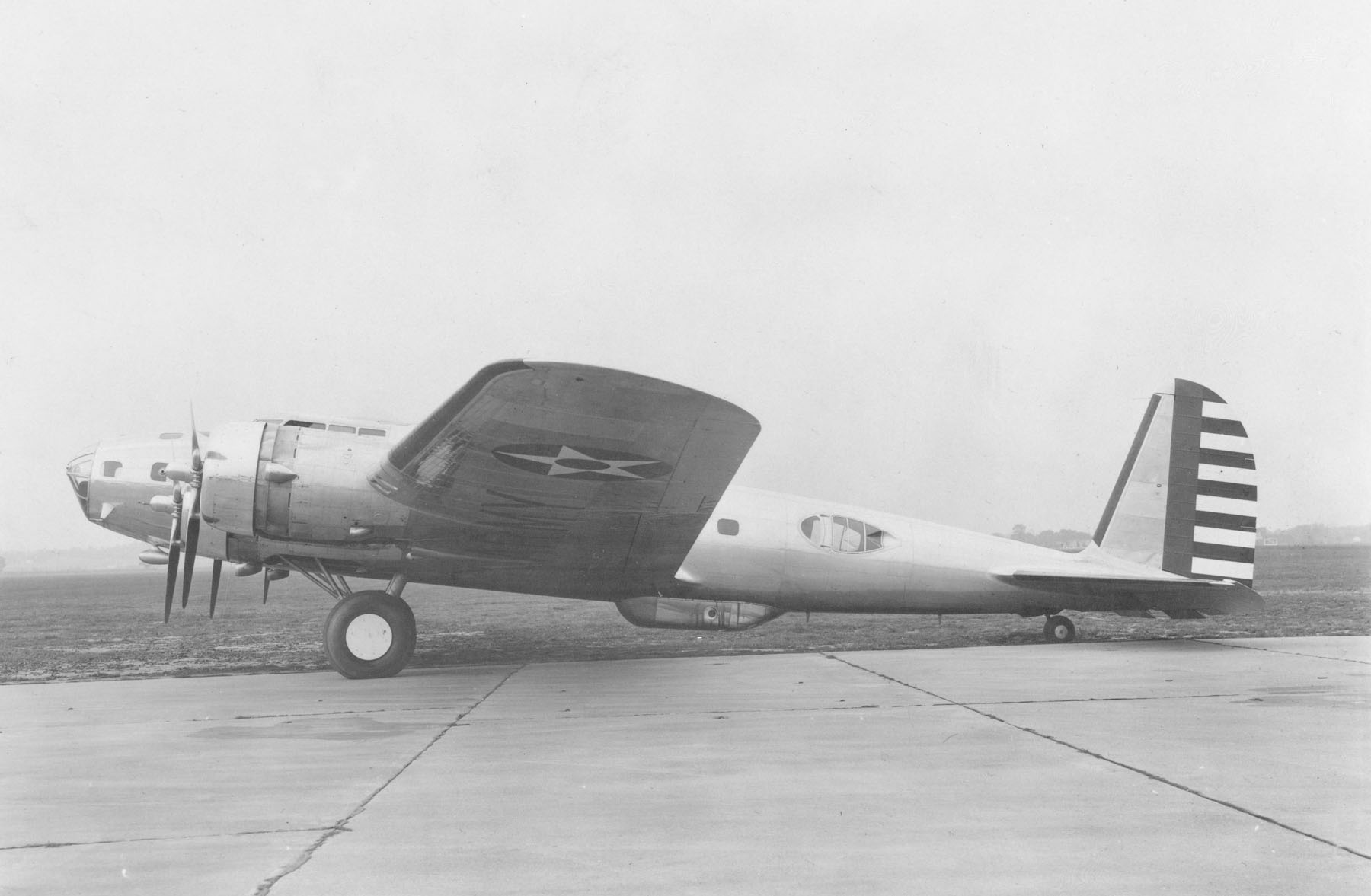
Boeing B-17C

The first predecessor of the squadron was initially activated at Fort Douglas, Utah in January 1941 as the 12th Reconnaissance Squadron. While it was assigned to a higher echelon, it was attached to the 39th Bombardment Group. Since a reorganization of General Headquarters Air Force in September 1936, each bombardment group of the Army Air Forces (AAF) had an attached reconnaissance squadron, which operated the same aircraft as that group's assigned bombardment squadrons. That arrangement continued for units like the 39th that were designated as medium and heavy bombardment units. The squadron flew Boeing B-17 Flying Fortresses, although as it was organizing, it also flew some North American B-25 Mitchells. While stationed at Fort Douglas, the squadron conducted flight operations from Salt Lake City Municipal Airport. In July 1941, the squadron moved with the 39th Group to Geiger Field, Washington.

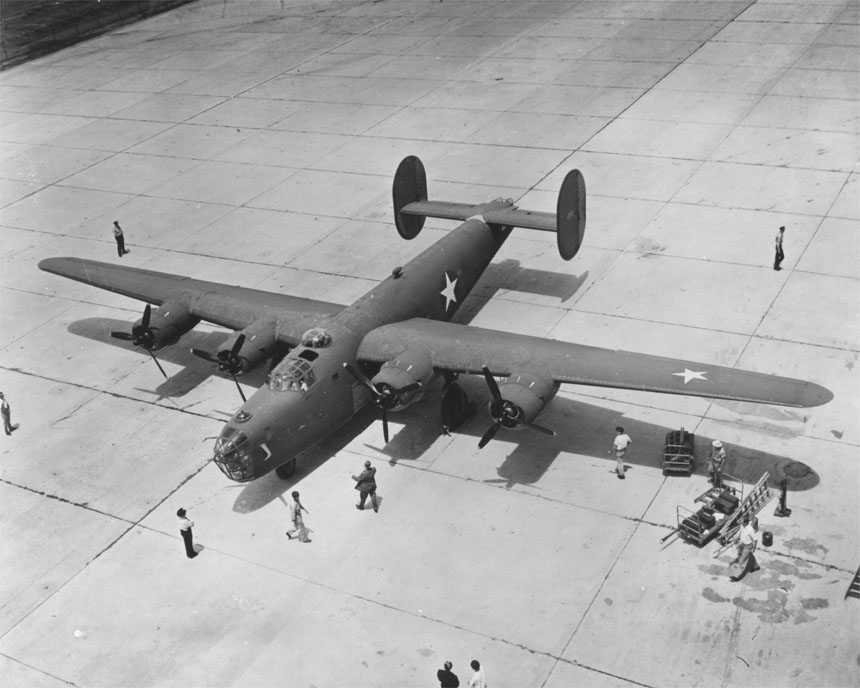
Consolidated B-24E

Following the Attack on Pearl Harbor, the squadron flew antisubmarine patrols off the Pacific Coast until February 1942, when it moved to Davis-Monthan Field, Arizona. At Davis-Monthan, it converted to Consolidated B-24 Liberators. In the spring of 1942 the AAF recognized there was little difference in the equipment and mission of the attached reconnaissance squadrons from that of the parent group's assigned bombardment squadrons. As a result, the squadron was redesignated the 402d Bombardment Squadron in April 1942 and was assigned, not attached, to the 39th Group. With its Liberators, the squadron became an Operational Training Unit (OTU). The OTU program involved the use of an oversized parent unit to provide cadres to "satellite groups" It then assumed responsibility for their training and oversaw their expansion with graduates of Army Air Forces Training Command schools to become effective combat units. The OTU program was patterned after the unit training system of the Royal Air Force. Phase I training concentrated on individual training in crewmember specialties. Phase II training emphasized the coordination for the crew to act as a team. The final phase concentrated on operation as a unit.

By late 1943 most of the AAF's units had been activated and almost three quarters of them had deployed overseas. With the exception of special programs, like forming Boeing B-29 Superfortress units, training “fillers” for existing units became more important than unit training. The squadron mission changed to that of a Replacement Training Unit (RTU). The RTU was also an oversized unit, but its mission was to train individual pilots or aircrews.

However, the AAF was finding that standard military units like the 402nd, whose manning was based on relatively inflexible tables of organization were proving not well adapted to the training mission, even more so to the replacement mission. Accordingly, the AAF adopted a more functional system in which each base was organized into a separate numbered unit. Most of the OTUs and RTUs were inactivated or disbanded and training activities given to these base units. The 39th Group and its components were inactivated, and along with supporting units at Davis-Monthan, replaced by the 233rd AAF Base Unit (Combat Crew Training School, Bombardment, Heavy).

==== B-29 operations and combat ====
The 39th Group and its squadrons, including the 402nd, were activated the same day at Smoky Hill Army Air Field, Kansas as B-29 Superfortress units. However, before the squadron could become fully manned and equipped, the AAF reorganized its B-29 units. Although this reorganization increased the number of aircraft assigned to each squadron and to the group, it reduced the number of squadrons in the group from four to three. The squadron was inactivated in this reorganization on 10 May, and its crews and airplanes were distributed to the other three squadrons of the 39th Group.

A few weeks later, on 1 June 1944, the squadron was activated once again at Davis-Monthan Field as a component of the newly organized 502d Bombardment Group. Five days later, the squadron moved to Dalhart Army Air Field, Texas to begin training with the B-29. The squadron trained at Dalhart and at Grand Island Army Air Field, Nebraska until 7 April 1945, when it departed for the Pacific.

The squadron arrived at its combat station, Northwest Field, Guam on 12 May 1945. It flew its first combat mission on 30 June, an attack on Rota. It carried out attacks on Truk during July. It flew its first mission against the Japanese Home Islands on 15 July, against the oil refinery at Kudamatsu, and until the end of the war, concentrated on attacks on the Japanese petroleum industry. It was awarded a Distinguished Unit Citation for August 1945 attacks on the coal liquefaction plant at Ube, a tank farm at Amagasaki and the Nippon Oil refinery at Tsuchizaki. After the war it participated in show of force missions and evacuated prisoners of war. The squadron remained on Guam until it was inactivated on 15 April 1946.

=== Tactical air support ===
In 1969, the 702d Tactical Air Support Squadron activated at Bergstrom Air Force Base, Texas to provide light airlift and forward control support for the Tactical Air Control System, the deployable command and control system of Tactical Air Command under the control of Twelfth Air Force. It continued this mission, maintaining readiness to deploy and participating in exercises for the next thirteen years until inactivating late in 1975.

The two squadrons were consolidated in September 1985, but the consolidated unit has remained inactive.

== Lineage ==
402d Bombardment Squadron

- Constituted as the 12th Reconnaissance Squadron (Heavy) on 20 November 1940

Activated on 15 January 1941
Redesignated 402d Bombardment Squadron (Heavy) on 22 April 1942
Redesignated 402d Bombardment Squadron, Very Heavy on 28 March 1944
Inactivated on 1 April 1944

- Activated on 1 April 1944

Inactivated on 10 May 1944

- Activated on 1 June 1944

Inactivated on 15 April 1946

- Consolidated with the 702d Tactical Air Support Squadron as the 702d Tactical Air Support Squadron on 19 September 1985 (remained inactive)

702d Tactical Air Support Squadron

- Constituted as 702d Tactical Air Support Squadron on 23 July 1969

Activated on 25 July 1969
Inactivated on 30 November 1975

- Consolidated with 402d Bombardment Squadron on 19 September 1985

=== Assignments ===
- Unknown (probably Northwest Air District (later Second Air Force)), 15 January 1941 (attached to 39th Bombardment Group)
- Unknown (probably II Bomber Command), 5 September 1941 (attached to 39th Bombardment Group)
- 39th Bombardment Group, 25 February 1942 – 1 April 1944
- 39th Bombardment Group, 1 April – 10 May 1944
- 502d Bombardment Group, 1 June 1944 – 15 April 1946
- 4467th Tactical Air Support Group, 25 July 1969
- 71st Tactical Air Support Group, 1 January 1970
- 602d Tactical Air Support Group, 1 June 1974 – 30 November 1975

=== Stations ===
- Fort Douglas, Utah, 15 January 1941
- Geiger Field, Washington, 2 July 1941
- Davis-Monthan Field, Arizona, 5 February 1942 – 1 April 1944
- Smoky Hill Army Air Field, Kansas, 1 April 1944 – 10 May 1944
- Davis-Monthan Field, Arizona, 1 June 1944
- Dalhart Army Air Field, Texas, 5 June 1944
- Grand Island Army Air Field, Nebraska, 26 September 1944 – 7 April 1945
- Northwest Field, Guam, 12 May 1945 – 15 April 1946
- Bergstrom Air Force Base, Texas, 25 July 1969 – 30 November 1975

=== Aircraft ===
- North American B-25 Mitchell, 1941
- Boeing B-17 Flying Fortress, 1941–1942
- Consolidated B-24 Liberator, 1942–1944
- Boeing B-29 Superfortress, 1944–1946

=== Awards and campaigns ===
Award streamer	Award	Dates	Notes
	Presidential Unit Citation	5–15 August 1945	Japan, 402nd Bombardment Squadron
	Air Force Outstanding Unit Award	15 January 1970 - 15 January 1972	702nd Tactical Air Support Squadron

Campaign Streamer	Campaign	Dates	Notes
	Antisubmarine	7 December 1941–January 1942	402nd Bombardment Squadron
	American Theater without inscription	7 December 1941 – 7 April 1945	402nd Bombardment Squadron
	Air Offensive, Japan	12 May 1945 – 2 September 1945	402nd Bombardment Squadron
	Western Pacific	12 May 1945 – 2 September 1945	402nd Bombardment Squadron
	Eastern Mandates	30 June 1945 – 1945	402nd Bombardment Squadron (Note: The campaign terminated in April 1944, but credit was given for actual combat in the area on later dates.)
