= 402 (disambiguation) =

402 may refer to:

- 402 (year), the year 402.
- 402 (number), the number 402.
- 402 BC, the year 402 Before Christ.
- 402 Chloë, an asteroid.
- Area code 402, a telephone area code.
- Cessna 402, a type of aircraft.
- IBM 402, a 1940 accounting machine.
- Peugeot 402, a type of car.
- X.402, defines the system architecture of an X.400 Message Handling System.

== See also ==
- 402nd (disambiguation)
