= Karen LeDoux =

Retired US army general

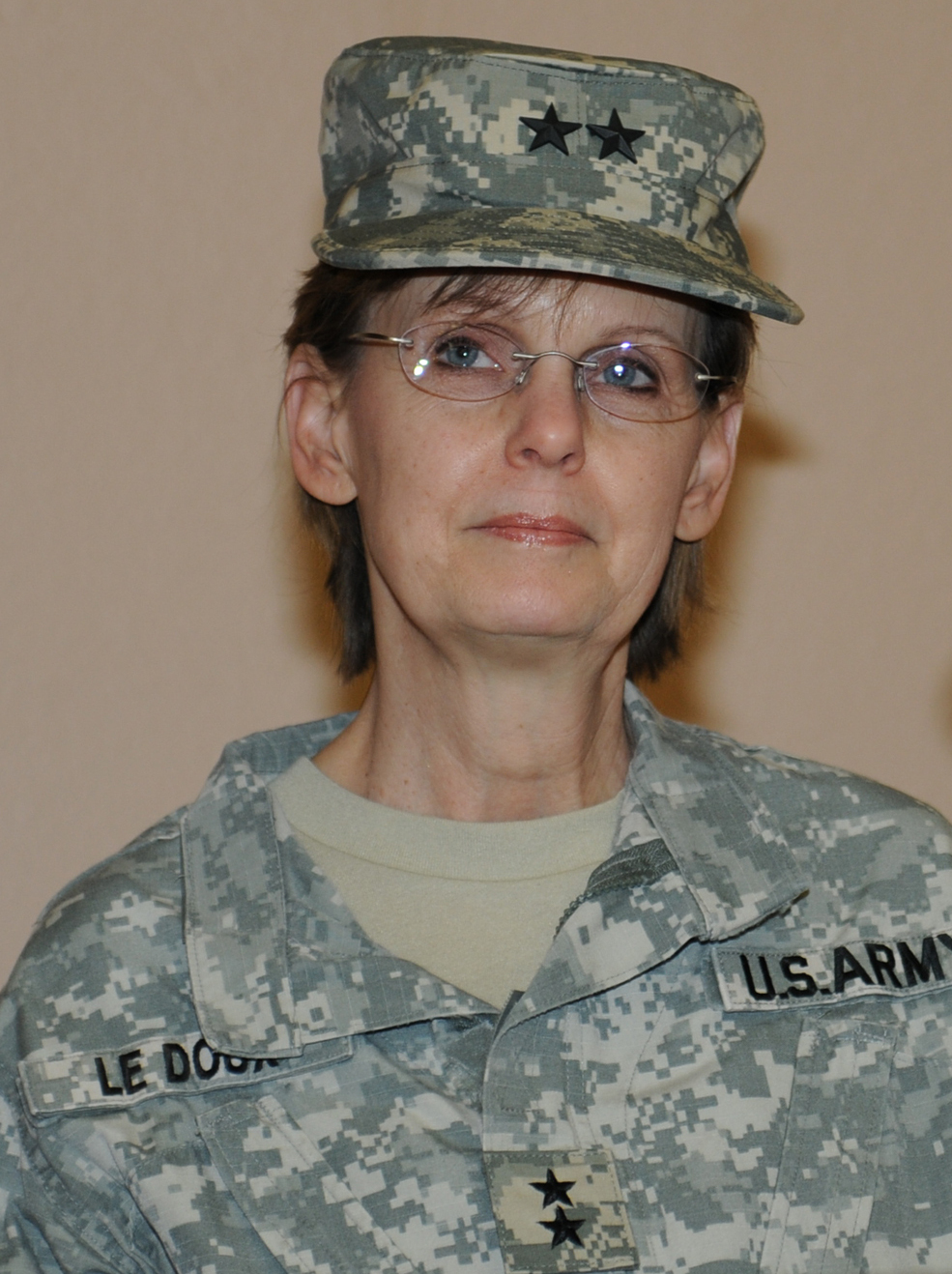
Major General Karen LeDoux in 2013

Karen LeDoux is a retired major general in the United States Army Reserve and former Commander of Fort McCoy, Wisconsin.

== Career ==
LeDoux originally joined the United States Army in 1983. She was then assigned to the 1st Armored Division in Germany.

After receiving further training at Aberdeen Proving Ground, LeDoux joined the 5th Infantry Division in 1988. In 1993, she transferred to the Army Reserve.

In 1997, LeDoux returned to Germany, serving in the Office of the Deputy Chief of Staff of United States Army Europe. Later, she was deployed to serve in the Iraq War.

LeDoux assumed command of the 55th Sustainment Brigade in 2006. She held the position until 2007, at which time she became Commander of the 103rd Sustainment Command (Expeditionary). In 2009, she assumed command of the 94th Infantry Division.

LeDoux was assigned to the United States Army Materiel Command at Camp Arifjan in Kuwait from 2011 to 2012. Afterwards, she began her current duties.

Awards she has received include the Legion of Merit, the Bronze Star Medal, the Meritorious Service Medal, the Joint Service Commendation Medal, the Army Commendation Medal and the Army Achievement Medal.

== Education ==
- University of Central Missouri
- United States Army Command and General Staff College
- United States Army War College
- CAPSTONE Military Leadership Program
