= John F. Wharton (general) =

US Army officer (born c. 1957)

Major General John Francis Wharton
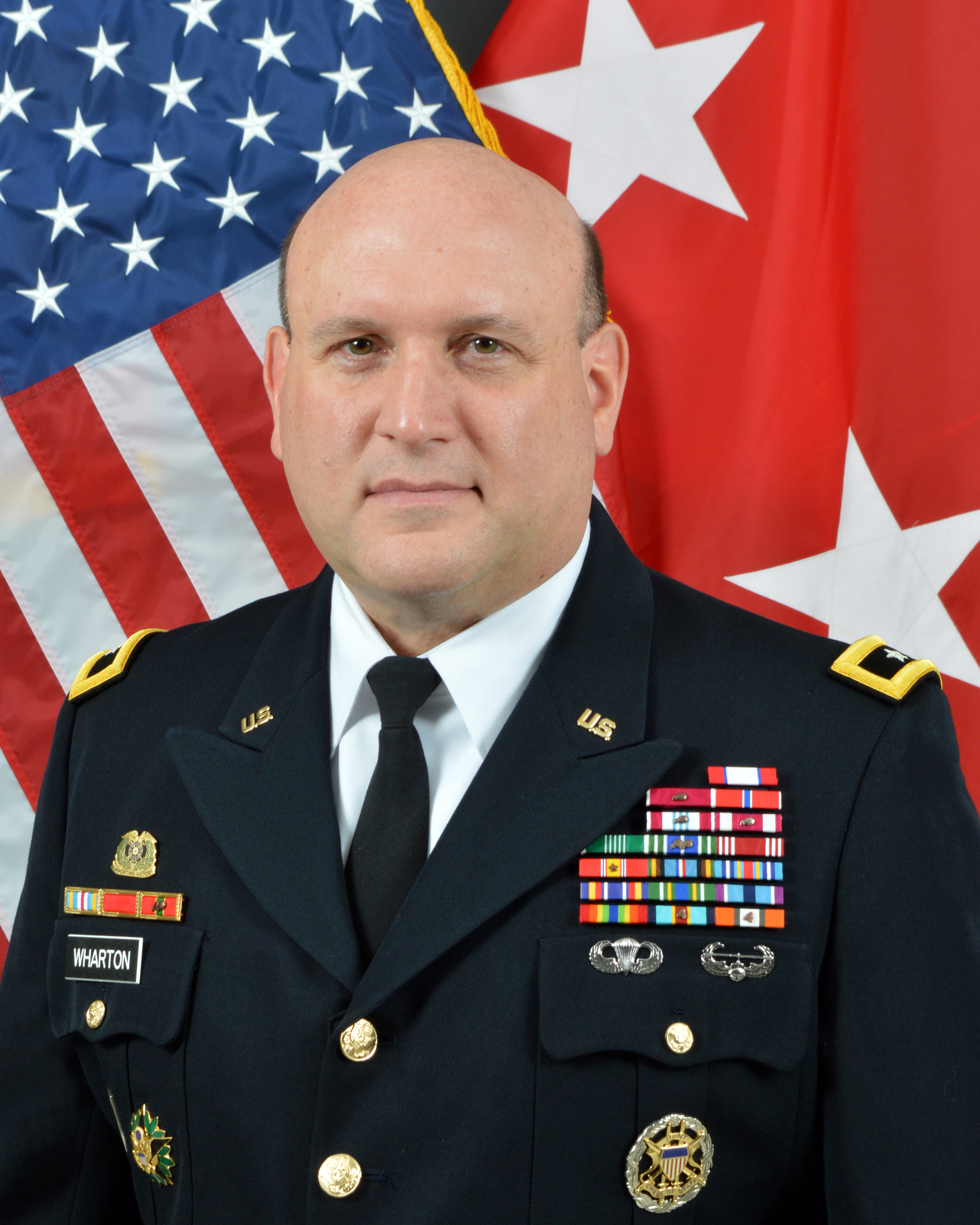
- Born: December 28, 1957 (age 68); Dover AFB, Delaware, U.S.
- Alma mater: United States Military Academy (BS); United States Naval War College (MS)
- Military career
- Allegiance: United States of America
- Branch: United States Army
- Service years: 1981–2016
- Rank: Major General
- Commands: U.S. Army Research, Development and Engineering Command; U.S. Army Sustainment Command; Rock Island Arsenal; U.S. Army Materiel Command-Southwest Asia; 55th Theater Support Command; 1st United States Army Support Battalion
- Conflicts: Global war on terrorism Operation Iraqi Freedom; Operation Enduring Freedom
- Awards: Distinguished Service Medal (3); Legion of Merit (3); Bronze Star Medal; Defense Meritorious Service Medal (2); Meritorious Service Medal (6); Army Commendation Medal; Army Achievement Medal (3)

Major General John Francis Wharton (born December 28, 1957) is a retired general of the United States Army. He was a career Army Logistician who also led US Army Science and Technology. In his last assignment served as the commanding general of the U.S. Army Research, Development and Engineering Command at Aberdeen Proving Ground in Maryland. Before that, Wharton served as the commanding general of U.S. Army Sustainment Command and Rock Island Arsenal, and as the senior commander for U.S. Army Garrison, Rock Island, Illinois.

== Education ==
Born in Delaware and raised in South Carolina, Wharton graduated from the United States Military Academy in West Point, New York in 1981. In addition, his education includes the Quartermaster Basic and Advanced Courses, the Inspector General's Course, the Command and General Staff College. He also holds a Master of Science degree in national security and strategic studies from the Naval War College.

== Military career ==
After graduating from the United States Military Academy in 1981, Wharton's first assignment was at Fort Hood, Texas, where he served as main supply platoon leader and company commander, 15th Supply and Transport Battalion, 1st Cavalry Division.

In 1985, he transferred to the Dragon Brigade, XVIII Airborne Corps, Fort Bragg, North Carolina, and later deployed to Sinai, Egypt, with Task Force 3-502nd Infantry, 101st Airborne Division (Air Assault) as part of the Multinational Force and Observers. He remained deployed with TF 2-504th Parachute Infantry Regiment (Airborne), 82nd Airborne Division, becoming the first commander of the Support Company, Logistical Support Unit.

In 1986, Wharton assumed duties as an inspector general to the U.S. Army Western Command at Fort Shafter, Hawaii. Following that tour, he served as battalion S-3 (operations officer) in the 25th Supply and Transport Battalion, 25th Infantry Division (Light), Schofield Barracks, Hawaii. From 1992 to 1994 he was the Lieutenant Colonels' Assignments Officer at the U.S. Army's Personnel Command, Alexandria, Virginia, and then moved to Fort Drum, New York, to be battalion executive officer in the 210th Forward Support Battalion, 10th Mountain Division (Light Infantry) and later deployed to Operation Restore/Uphold Democracy as the Battalion Commander (Forward). Following the deployment, he remained at Fort Drum as chief, Division Materiel Management Center, 10th Mountain Division Support Command from 1995 to 1996. For the next two years he served as a joint Strategy Planner in the Logistics Directorate, J-4, Joint Chiefs of Staff, Washington, D.C. In 1998, he took command of the 1st United States Army Support Battalion, 507th Corps Support Group (Airborne), MFO, Sinai, Egypt. After command, he served a second tour at U.S. Army Personnel Command as the quartermaster branch chief.

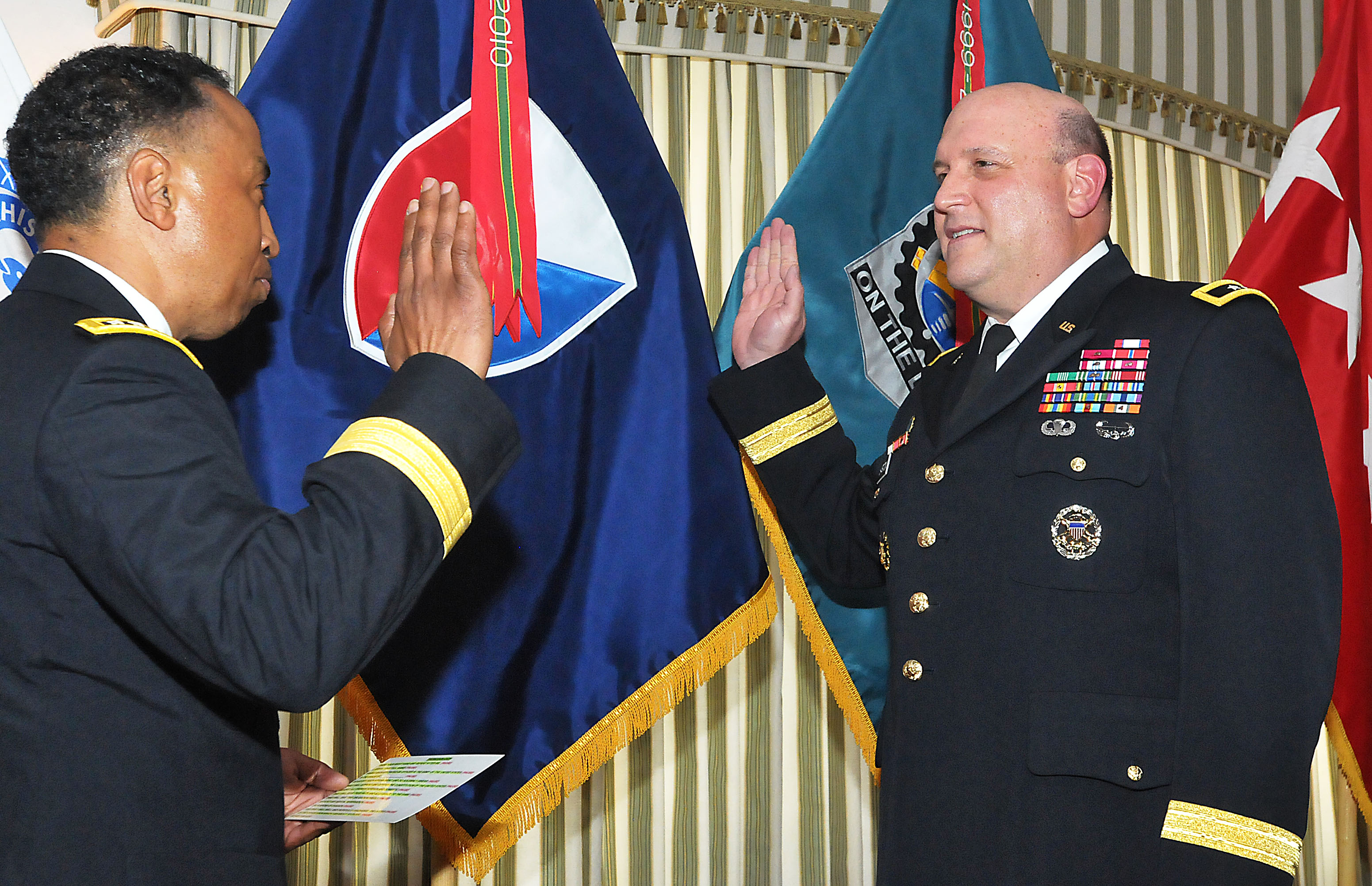
Gen. Dennis L. Via, commanding general of AMC, administers the oath of office to Maj. Gen. John Wharton, ASC commanding general.

In 2001, Wharton assumed brigade command of the 55th Theater Support Command (AC/RC), Eighth United States Army. From 2003 to 2004, he led the CSA's Task Force Logistics and was subsequently selected to be Deputy Commander (Futures), U.S. Army Combined Arms Support Command. In 2006 he became director, Army Initiatives Group, Army G-4, followed by executive officer to the Headquarters Department of the Army Deputy Chief of Staff for Logistics, G-4, Washington, D.C. In 2008, he deployed to Kuwait as commanding general, AMC-SWA/U.S. Army Central G-4/CFLCC C-4 for Operations Iraqi Freedom and Enduring Freedom. He was the U.S. Army Materiel Command chief of staff from November 2009 to March 2012. Wharton's penultimate assignment was as commanding general, U.S. Army Sustainment Command and Rock Island Arsenal, and as the senior commander for U.S. Army Garrison, Rock Island, Illinois. His final assignment was as the commanding general of the U.S. Army Research, Development and Engineering Command at Aberdeen Proving Ground, Maryland.

== Awards and decorations ==
Badges
Joint Chiefs of Staff Identification Badge
Army Staff Identification Badge
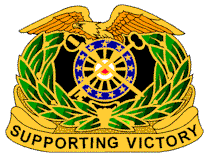
U.S. Army Quartermaster Corps Distinctive Unit Insignia
Parachutist Badge
Air Assault Badge

Personal Decorations
Army Distinguished Service Medal (with two oak leaf clusters)
Legion of Merit (with two oak leaf clusters)
Bronze Star
Defense Meritorious Service Medal (with one oak leaf cluster)
Meritorious Service Medal (with one silver leaf cluster)
Army Commendation Medal
Army Achievement Medal (with two oak leaf clusters)

Service Awards
Army Good Conduct Medal
National Defense Service Medal (with one service star)
Armed Forces Expeditionary Medal
Global War on Terrorism Expeditionary Medal
Global War on Terrorism Service Medal
Korea Defense Service Medal
Humanitarian Service Medal
Army Service Ribbon
Army Overseas Service Ribbon (with 4 numeral device)
Multinational Force and Observers Medal (with 4 numeral device)

Unit Decorations
Joint Meritorious Unit Award (with two oak leaf clusters)
Meritorious Unit Commendation
Army Superior Unit Award (with two oak leaf clusters)

Military offices
Preceded by Major General Patricia E. McQuistion	Commander, United States Army Sustainment Command and Commander, Rock Island Arsenal; 2012–2014	Succeeded by Major General Kevin G. O'Connell
Preceded by Dale A. Ormond	Commander, United States Army Research, Development, and Engineering Command; 2014–2016	Succeeded by Major General Cedric T. Wins
