= 55th Sustainment Brigade =

- 55th Sustainment Brigade shoulder sleeve insignia
- Active: 2006–present
- Country: United States
- Branch: United States Army Reserve
- Type: Sustainment Brigade
- Size: Brigade
- Part of: 310th Expeditionary Sustainment Command
- Garrison/HQ: Fort Belvoir, Virginia
- Mottos: "Sustain the Force, Secure the Victory"
- Battle honours: Operation Joint Endeavor; Operation Iraqi Freedom; Operation Enduring Freedom; Operation Inherent Resolve

Commanders
- Commanding officer: COL Tara Trout
- Command Sergeant Major: CSM Edward Carrington
- Notable commanders: MG Dempsey D. Kee (R); MG Celia L. Adolphi (R); MG John F. Wharton (R); MG Karen LeDoux (R); BG Therese M. O'Brien (R); COL Karen L. Jennings (R)

Insignia
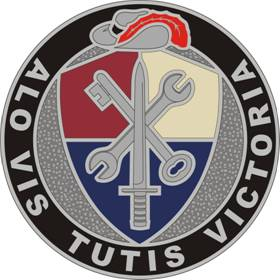
- Distinctive Unit Insignia

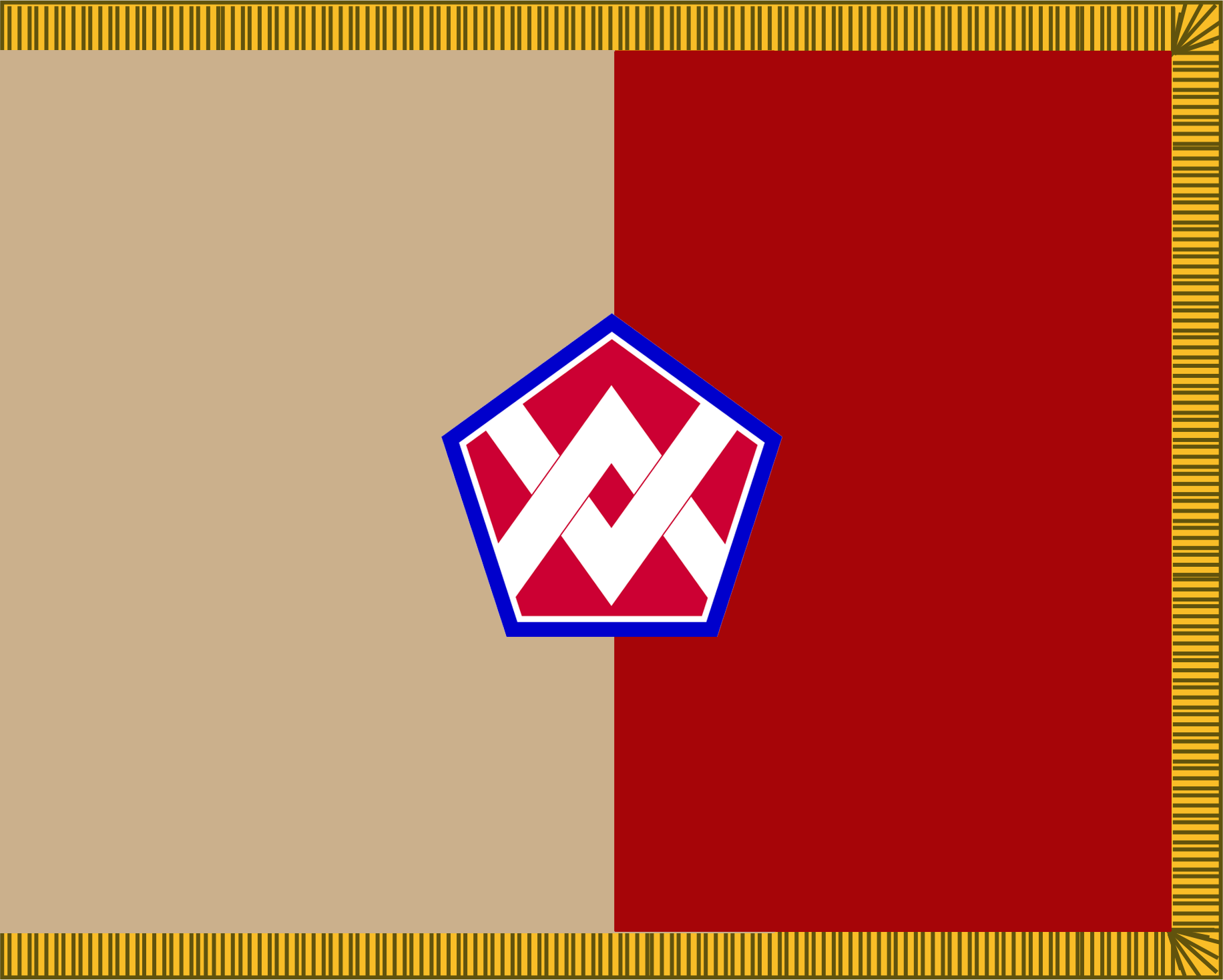
- 55th Sustainment Brigade Flag

The 55th Sustainment Brigade is a sustainment brigade of the United States Army Reserve.

It is located at Fort Belvoir, Virginia. Activated in March 2006, the unit has served at least one tour in Iraq and Afghanistan.

The 55th Sustainment Brigade was established in September 2006 from the 55th Theater Material Management Center. The mission of the brigade is to provide command and control for all subordinate units, and provide sustainment in an area of operations as defined by the ESC/TSC. The sustainment brigade plans and executes sustainment, distribution, theater opening and reception, staging, and onward movement of Army forces in full spectrum operations as directed by the ESC/TSC.

== Organization ==
The brigade is a subordinate unit of the 310th Expeditionary Sustainment Command. As of January 2026 the brigade consists of the following units:

- 55th Sustainment Brigade, at Fort Belvoir (VA)
  - 55th Special Troops Battalion, at Fort Belvoir (VA)
    - Headquarters and Headquarters Company, 55th Sustainment Brigade, at Fort Belvoir (VA)
    - 410th Brigade Signal Company (MEB/CAB/SB), at Fort Belvoir (VA)
  - 313th Transportation Battalion (Movement Control), in Baltimore (MD)
    - Headquarters and Headquarters Detachment, 313th Transportation Battalion (Movement Control), in Baltimore (MD)
    - 199th Transportation Detachment (Movement Control Team), in Upper Marlboro (MD)
    - 200th Transportation Detachment (Movement Control Team), in Baltimore (MD)
    - 319th Transportation Detachment (Movement Control Team), in Dover (DE)
    - 430th Transportation Company (Inland Cargo Transfer Company — ICTC), in Baltimore (MD)
      - Detachment 1, 430th Transportation Company (Inland Cargo Transfer Company — ICTC), at Biddle Air National Guard Base (PA)
    - 678th Transportation Detachment (Movement Control Team), at Joint Base Langley–Eustis (VA)
    - 679th Transportation Detachment (Movement Control Team), at Fort Eustis (VA)
  - 398th Combat Sustainment Support Battalion, in Rockville (MD)
    - Headquarters and Headquarters Company, 398th Combat Sustainment Support Battalion, in Rockville (MD)
    - 611th Quartermaster Company (Field Service) (Modular), in Baltimore (MD)
    - 673rd Quartermaster Company (Mortuary Affairs), in Dover (DE)
    - 774th Quartermaster Detachment (Field Feeding Team), in Salem (VA)
    - 775th Quartermaster Detachment (Field Feeding Team), in Towson (MD)
    - 776th Quartermaster Detachment (Field Feeding Team), in Rockville (MD)
    - 818th Ordnance Company (Support Maintenance), at Fort Meade (MD)
    - 946th Transportation Medium Truck Company (POL, 5K GAL) (EAB Linehaul), in Lewes (DE)
      - Detachment 1, 946th Transportation Medium Truck Company (POL, 5K GAL) (EAB Linehaul), in Newark (DE)
    - 988th Quartermaster Detachment (Theater Petroleum Laboratory Team), in Rockville (MD)
    - 1015th Quartermaster Company (Supply), in Baltimore (MD)
  - 497th Combat Sustainment Support Battalion, in Salem (VA)
    - Headquarters and Headquarters Company, 497th Combat Sustainment Support Battalion, in Salem (VA)
    - 261st Ordnance Company (Ammo) (Modular), in Charleston (WV)
      - 1st Platoon, 261st Ordnance Company (Ammo) (Modular), in Millwood (WV)
      - 2nd Platoon, 261st Ordnance Company (Ammo) (Modular), in Kenova (WV)
    - 275th Quartermaster Company (Field Service) (Modular), at Fort Pickett (VA)
    - 424th Transportation Medium Truck Company (Cargo) (EAB Linehaul), in Dublin (VA)
      - Detachment 1, 424th Transportation Medium Truck Company (Cargo) (EAB Linehaul), at Joint Expeditionary Base Little Creek–Fort Story (VA)
    - 639th Transportation Medium Truck Company (PLS) (EAB Tactical), in Bedford (VA)
    - 751st Quartermaster Company (Petroleum Support), in Bedford (VA)
    - 811th Ordnance Company (Ammo) (Modular), in Rainelle (WV)
      - 1st Platoon, 811th Ordnance Company (Ammo) (Modular), in Dublin (VA)
      - 2nd Platoon, 811th Ordnance Company (Ammo) (Modular), at Letterkenny Army Depot (PA)
Abbreviations: PLS — Palletized Load System; POL — Petroleum Oil Lubricants; EAB — Echelon Above Brigade

== 55th Sustainment Brigade Lineage ==
The 55th MMCs Lineage began with the creation of the 435th Highway Transport Command (HTC) in 1954. In 1963, the 435th HTC was reorganized and redesignated as the 300th Transportation Group (TG). In 1969, the 300th TG was redesignated as the 300th Field Army Support Command. On 30 November 1977, the 300th Field Army Support Command was reorganized and redesignated as the 55th MMC. The 55th MMC was assigned to the 310th Logistical Command at the John Singleton Mosby United States Army Reserve Center, Fort Belvoir, Virginia.

When the 310th Logistical Command moved from Fort Myer, Virginia to a warehouse in the heart of Old Town Alexandria, Virginia the new home was designated the Mosby USAR Center" in honor of Colonel John Singleton Mosby, also known as 'The Gray Ghost', who was a native of Alexandria. Colonel Mosby's Rangers operated primarily in the Northern Virginia area often disrupting the logistical supply lines of the Union Army. During the late 1950s, his exploits received wide publicity as the result of the weekly television series "The Gray Ghost". The series was based on the book "Gray Ghosts and Rebel Raiders" by Virgil Carrington Jones. When the 310th moved to the Army Reserve Center at Fort Belvoir, Virginia in 1975, the building was dedicated as the John Singleton Mosby United States Army Reserve Center (JSMUSARC).)

For two decades, the 55th MMC's training prepared the soldiers to augment the 200th Theater Army Materiel Management Center (TAMMC) in Zweibruecken, Germany. This paired the reserve soldiers with their counterpart active duty personnel and units with whom they would be involved if there were to be war in Europe. The 55th MMC soldiers were present on an Active Tour (AT) when the Berlin Wall came down. Soldiers from the 55th MMC have served with distinction in a wide variety of missions, including individuals who have been called to active duty to support the Army's objectives in Operation Desert Shield and Storm" (Persian Gulf) and "Operation Restore Democracy" (Haiti).

The 55th TSC (MMC) consists of forward and rear elements. This organization operates under a split-based concept with a forward element that is in support of deployed theater units while maintaining a rear element in support of non-deployed units. When required, this organization deploys Material Management Teams (MMTs) capable of providing limited Corps Materiel Management Center (CMMC) forward functions and immediate communications with all elements prior to the establishment of the theater communications network.

The 55th Materiel Management Center (MMC), Theater Support Command (TSC), (Multi-Component) was activated on 17 October 2000 by combining the 55th MMC in Fort Belvoir, Virginia, and the 6th Support Center, MMC's, in Taegu, Korea. The 55th MMC is now Multi-Component – part Reserve and part Active Duty unit. The active duty component is based at Camp Henry, South Korea and the reserve component is at Fort Belvoir, Virginia. The mission on the 55th is to Perform integrated supply and maintenance management at Theater level for the Army Service Component Theater Support Command on all classes of supply (less classified maps, medical, and COMSEC) and for all assigned and designated maintenance activities.

In support of the U.S. Army transformation objective and to ensure the ability to perform its wartime mission in non-linear, non-contiguous operational environments, the 55th MMC converted to the 55th Sustainment Brigade on 16 September 2006. On 2 January 2008 the unit was activated in support of Operation Iraqi Freedom and returned home in December 2008.

== Shoulder Sleeve Insignia ==
Description
On a red pentagon shape edged with a 1/16 inch (0.16 cm) white inner border, two white chevrons, the top inverted, both interlaced, all with a 1/8 inch (0.32 cm) blue border. The overall dimensions are 3 inches (7.6 cm) in width and 2 7/8 inches (7.3 cm) in height.

Symbolism
The pentagon-shape symbolizes the birth of the unit during the Global War on Terrorism and the unit's location not far from the Pentagon. Red, white and blue are the national colors, whereas red is the color traditionally used by Sustainment units. The "V" is for the Roman numeral "5", also signifying victory; combined with the pentagon alludes to the unit designation "55". The chevron represents support; interlaced with the inverted chevron suggests the unit's mission of support and maintaining the victory.

Background
The shoulder sleeve insignia was approved on 23 March 2006. (TIOH Dwg. No. A-1-888)

== Distinctive unit insignia ==
Description
A Silver shield shaped device 1 1/8 inches (2.9 cm) in diameter blazoned as follows: Per fess, the chief per pale Gules (Brick Red) and Buff, the base Azure (Dark Blue), a key ward upward and outward and a wrench in saltire Argent (Silver Gray), overall a dagger palewise point up of the last. Encircling the shield, a Black designation band displaying at top a Silver Gray Mosby hat, Black band and Red plume, inscribed at the bottom of the designation band "ALO VIS TUTIS VICTORIA" in Silver.

Symbolism
The shield symbolizes defense. Buff is the color traditionally associated with the Sustainment units, also reflecting the unit's Quartermaster lineage. The following colors and images depict the organizational lineage combined to form the Fifty-fifth Sustainment Brigade: Brick red signifies Transportation, Crimson (red) for Ordnance, Dark Blue for the Adjutant General Corps, the wrench suggests maintenance support and the key denotes the unit's control of military supplies by the Quartermaster Corps. The dagger with point up represents military support, signifying "Soldiers First". The Mosby hat with ostrich plume was worm by COL John Singleton Mosby, commander of the Civil War Mosby's Rangers and the namesake of the Reserve Center where the 55th Sustainment Brigade is located. The motto translates to "Sustain The Force, Secure The Victory".

Background
The distinctive unit insignia was approved on 23 March 2006.

== Combat Service Identification Badge ==
Description
A silver color metal and enamel device 2 inches (5.1 cm) in width consisting of a design similar to the shoulder sleeve insignia.

== Operation Joint Endeavor ==
Col. Celia Adolphi, 55th MMC Commander, and Command Sgt. Maj. Harry ShuBargo with soldiers of the 55th MMC (FWD) in front of their command headquarters during Operation Joint Endeavor

- COL Celia L. Adolphi 1996–1997
- CSM Harry E. ShuBargo 1996–1997

From 8 July 1996 through 3 February 1997, a seventy-person cell from the 55th MMC was mobilized for active duty to support the United Nations Peacekeeping mission in Bosnia. The unit's mission provided logistical and materiel management support to the soldiers of the U.S. Army's 1st Armor Division, 1st Infantry Division and other elements enforcing the peace in Bosnia-Herzegovina. A secondary mission was to assist those support elements based in Kapsovar and Taszar, Hungary. These locations became the main staging bases for all U.S. forces entering and leaving the Balkan theater of operations. Mission requirements were such that the 55th MMC soldiers found themselves stationed throughout the theater of operations in Bosnia, Croatia and Hungary. The 55th MMC functioned as a materiel management center for all supplies at the corps level during its deployment.

Adapting to changes since the end of the Cold War, the 55th MMC was reassigned from the 310th Theater Army Area Command (TAACOM) to the 99th Regional Support Command on 16 April 2000.

== Operation Iraqi Freedom ==
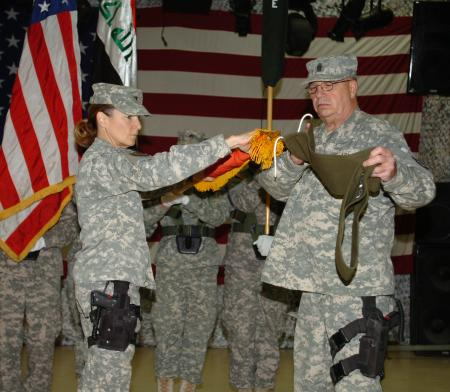
Col. Therese O’Brien, 55th Sustainment Brigade Commander, and Command Sgt. Maj. James Hill, senior enlisted leader of the 55th Sust. Bde., case the 55th Sust. Bde. colors during a transfer of authority ceremony held at Joint Base Balad, Iraq

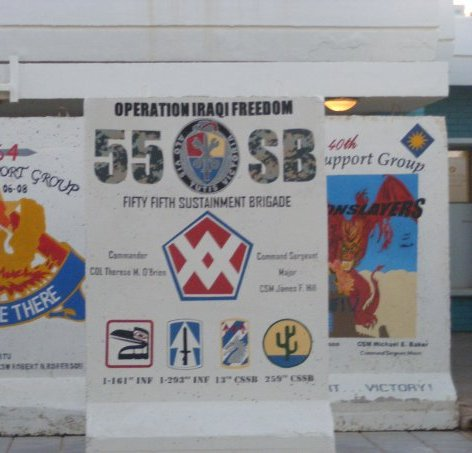
55th Sustainment Brigade T-Wall outside of the brigade headquarters at Joint Base Balad, Iraq

- COL Therese O'Brien 2008–2009
- CSM James Hill 2008–2009

The 55th Sustainment Brigade took command of sustainment operations at Joint Base Balad Iraq on 2 March 2008. The 55th provided logistical oversight of key commodities, distribution of all classes of supply and key maintenance services during their combat tour in support of Multi-National Divisions-North and Baghdad. A subordinate brigade of the 3d Expeditionary Sustainment Command, the 55th Sust. Brigade made history as the first reserve-component sustainment brigade to be deployed to Iraq. Since its arrival in March 2008, the 55th Sust. Bde. completed over 3,225 combat logistics patrols, drove over 6,800,000 miles, processed over 7500 transportation movement requests, and partnered with the 8th Iraqi Army and Kirkush Location Command to improve Iraq's military drive towards self-sustainment. On 11 December 2008 the 55th Sustainment Brigade transfer authority to the 304th Sustainment Brigade, bringing to an end a historical deployment.

Organization during deployment:

- 1st Bn, 161st Infantry Rgt, 81st Heavy Brigade Combat Team
- 1st Bn, 293rd Infantry Rgt, 76th Infantry Brigade Combat Team
- 13th Combat Service Support Bn, 3rd Sustainment Brigade
- 259th Combat Service Support Bn, 103rd Expeditionary Sustainment Command

== Operation Enduring Freedom ==
- COL Martha Wilkins 2013–2014
- CSM Levi Maynard 2013–2014

On 18 May 2013, more than 150 soldiers of the 55th Sustainment Brigade formally bid farewell to family and friends as the unit deployed in support of Operation Enduring Freedom. The 55th Sustainment Brigade assumed the role of Deputy Commander – Support Operations for NATO Training Mission Afghanistan, enabling the transition of sustainment and logistical functions from Coalition partnering to autonomous Afghan National Security Forces control.

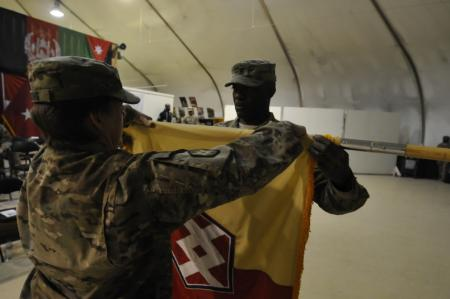
U.S. Army Col. Martha Wilkins, the commander of the Fort Belvoir, Va., – based 55th Sustainment Brigade, and U.S. Army Command Sgt. Maj. Levi Maynard, the top enlisted soldier for the unit, case the colors at an end of mission ceremony in Kabul, Afghanistan, on 4 April.The unit is nearing the end of its nine-month deployment where it helped improve the supply and record keeping capabilities, among other logistical areas, of the Afghan National Security Force. (Photo by U.S. Army Staff Sgt. John Zumer, IJC Public Affairs)

== Honors ==
=== Campaign streamers ===
Conflict	Streamer	Year(s)
Operation Iraqi Freedom	Iraqi Surge	2008–2009
Operation Enduring Freedom	Transition I	2013–2014
