= 402nd Army Field Support Brigade =

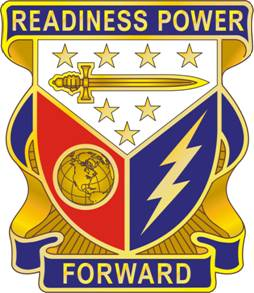
- Active: 2006 - present
- Country: United States
- Branch: United States Army
- Type: Support brigade
- Role: Support
- Size: Brigade
- Garrison/HQ: Fort Shafter, Hawaii
- Motto: Readiness Power Forward

Commanders
- Current commander: COL Matthew T. Amsdell
- Command Sergeant Major: CSM Luis Ortiz Escalera

Insignia
- Current SSI United States Army Materiel Command

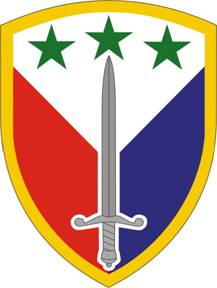
- Former SSI 2006-2010

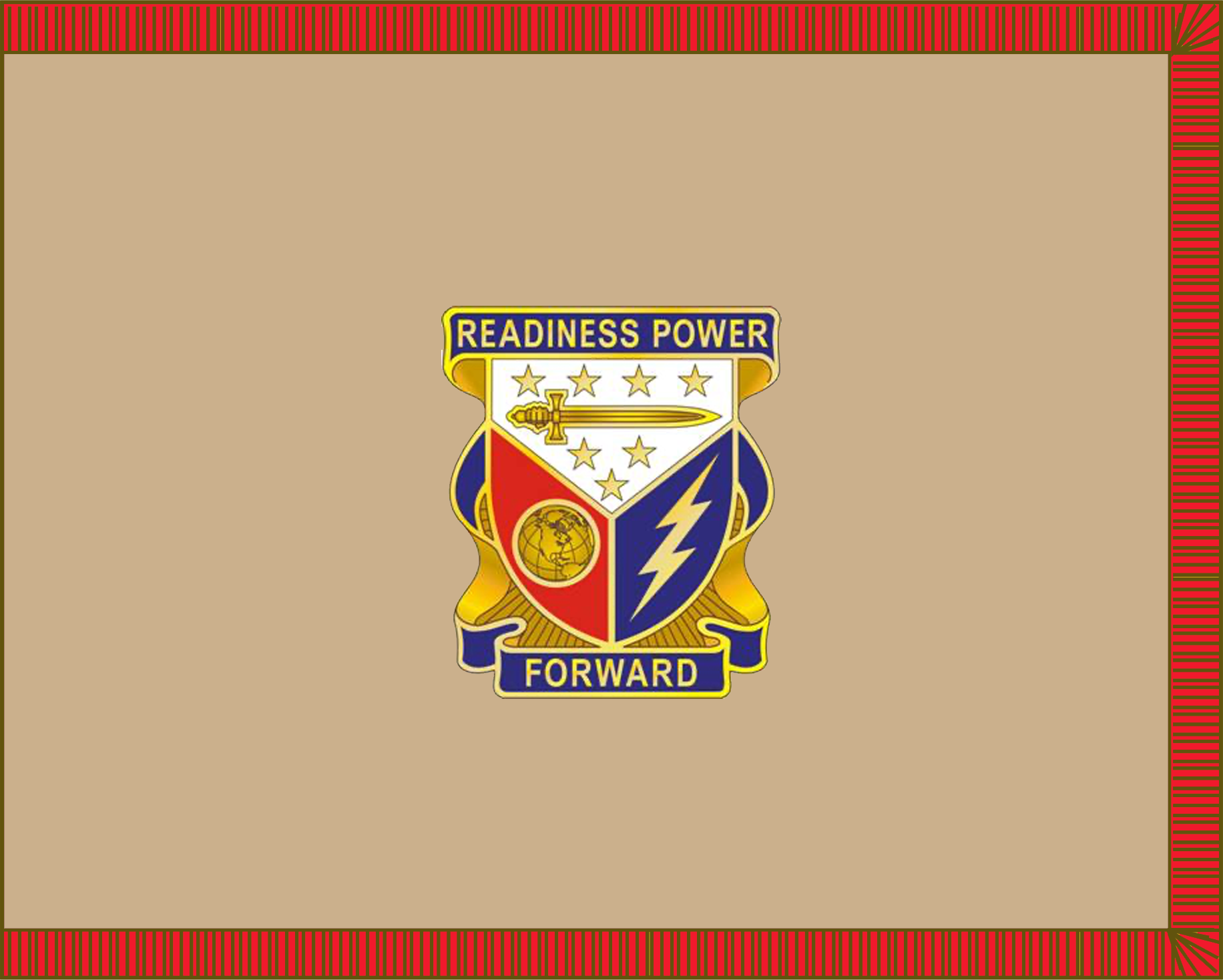
- 402nd Army Field Support Brigade Flag

The 402nd Army Field Support Brigade (AFSB) is a support brigade of the United States Army. The Brigade was activated on 16 October 2006 at Balad Air Base, Iraq. In 2010, the unit took over responsibility for Army Field Support Battalions (AFSBn) in Kuwait and Qatar from the 401st AFSB. The headquarters moved to Hawaii in 2015 to provide support to US Army Pacific and US Indo-Pacific Command.

== Organization ==
- 402nd Army Field Support Brigade, at Fort Shafter (HI)
  - Army Field Support Battalion-Alaska, at Fort Wainwright and Joint Base Elmendorf–Richardson (AK)
  - Army Field Support Battalion-Hawaii, at Schofield Barracks (HI)

== Insignia ==
The Distinctive Unit Insignia is a round bottom shield divided into thirds white, red and blue. The white top section contains a gold sword and 7 gold stars. The blue section a gold lightning bolt and the red section a gold globe. Above and below is a blue ribbon containing the motto "Readiness Power Forward."

== Former Commanders ==
From	To	Commander
	2006	COL John (Jack) O'Connor
2006	2007	COL George (Rob) R.C. Sorensen
2007	2008	COL Robert P. Sullivan
2008	2009	LTC (P) Ronald F. Fizer
2009	2010	COL Brian R. Haebig
2010	2011	COL Lawrence W. Fuller
2011	2012	COL John S. Laskodi
2012	2013	COL John D. Kuenzli
2013	2014	COL James D. Kinkade
2014	2015	COL Robert A. Dawson
2015	2017	COL Anthony L. McQueen
2017	2019	COL John C. Brookie
2019	2021	COL Anthony T. Walters
2021	2023	COL Erik C. Johnson
2023	2025	COL Courtney Sugai
2025	present	COL Matthew T. Amsdell
