= Patricia E. McQuistion =

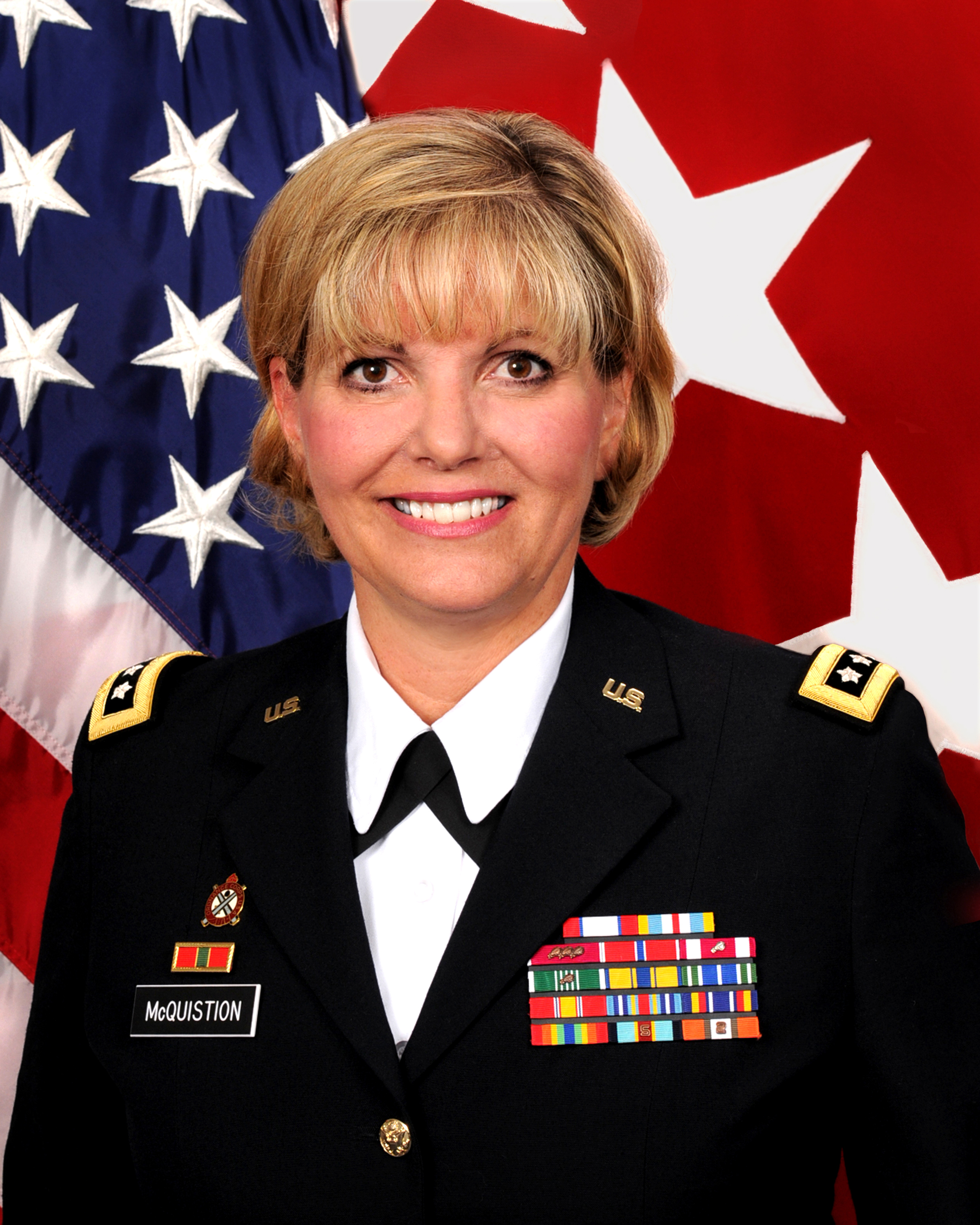
- Born: Steubenville, Ohio
- Military career
- Allegiance: United States
- Branch: United States Army
- Service years: 1980–2015
- Rank: Lieutenant General
- Commands: United States Army Sustainment Command; 21st Theater Sustainment Command; Defense Supply Center, Columbus; Tobyhanna Army Depot
- Awards: Army Distinguished Service Medal; Defense Superior Service Medal; Legion of Merit (4); Bronze Star Medal

Patricia E. McQuistion is a United states Lieutenant General lieutenant general of the United States Army. She served as deputy commander and chief of staff for the United States Army Materiel Command from 2012 until her retirement in 2015.

== Military career ==
Patricia McQuistion received her initial army officer training in the ROTC program at the University of Akron in Ohio. She graduated with a Bachelor of Science degree in biology and received her commission as a second lieutenant for the United States Army Ordnance Corps in 1980. She later earned a master's degree in acquisition management at Babson College in Wellesley, Massachusetts and a master's degree in national resource strategy at the National Defense University in Washington, D.C.

McQuistion's nomination for promotion to colonel was received by the Senate along with 429 others on February 2, 2000, and approved on April 27. McQuistion assumed command of the Tobyhanna Army Depot in Pennsylvania on July 12, 2001, and held that position until July 2003. She was nominated for promotion to the rank of brigadier general on August 31, 2005. This nomination was confirmed by the Senate on October 28. Two years later she assumed command of the Defense Supply Center in Columbus, Ohio on September 12, 2007.

McQuistion was appointed as commanding general of the 21st Theater Sustainment Command in Kaiserslautern, Germany on May 12, 2009. McQuistion was relieved from her command in Columbus on August 6, and assumed her new command on August 20. She was subsequently nominated for promotion to the rank of major general on October 15. This nomination was quickly reviewed and approved by the Senate on October 28. She received this promotion on November 10. After serving in Germany for two years, she was appointed commanding general of the United States Army Sustainment Command in Rock Island, Illinois on April 5, 2011. McQuistion was relieved from her previous command on August 25, and assumed her new position on October 28.

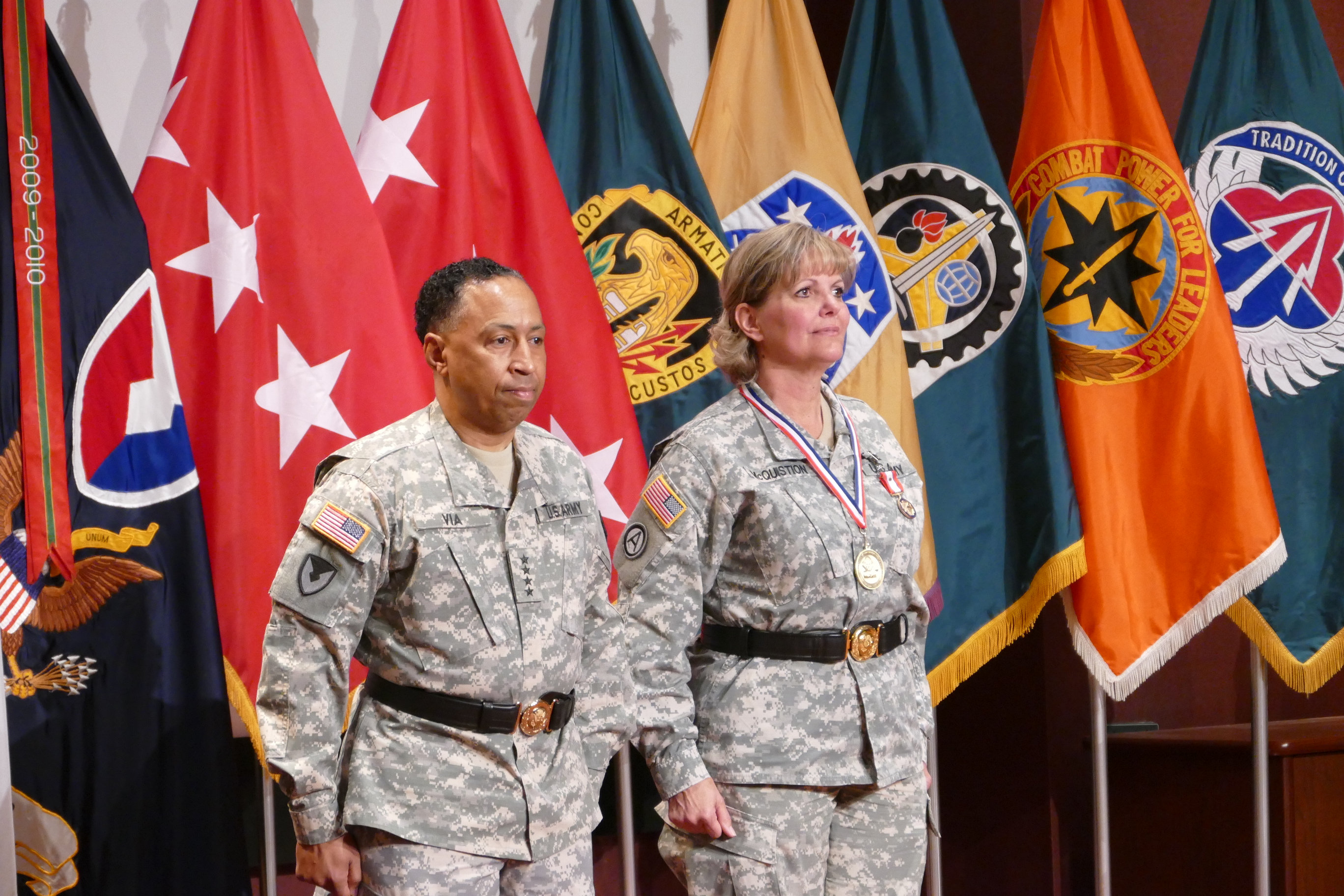
McQuistion and her superior, Gen. Dennis L. Via stand at attention at McQuistion's retirement ceremony on April 10, 2015.

McQuistion was nominated for promotion to the rank of lieutenant general on January 25, 2012. This nomination was confirmed by the Senate on April 26. She was relieved from her previous command on July 27. She received her promotion on August 2 and assumed her position as deputy commander and chief of staff for the United States Army Materiel Command on August 7. She served in this position for two and a half years until her retirement on April 10, 2015.
