= Hohenfels Army Airfield =

Military airfield in Germany

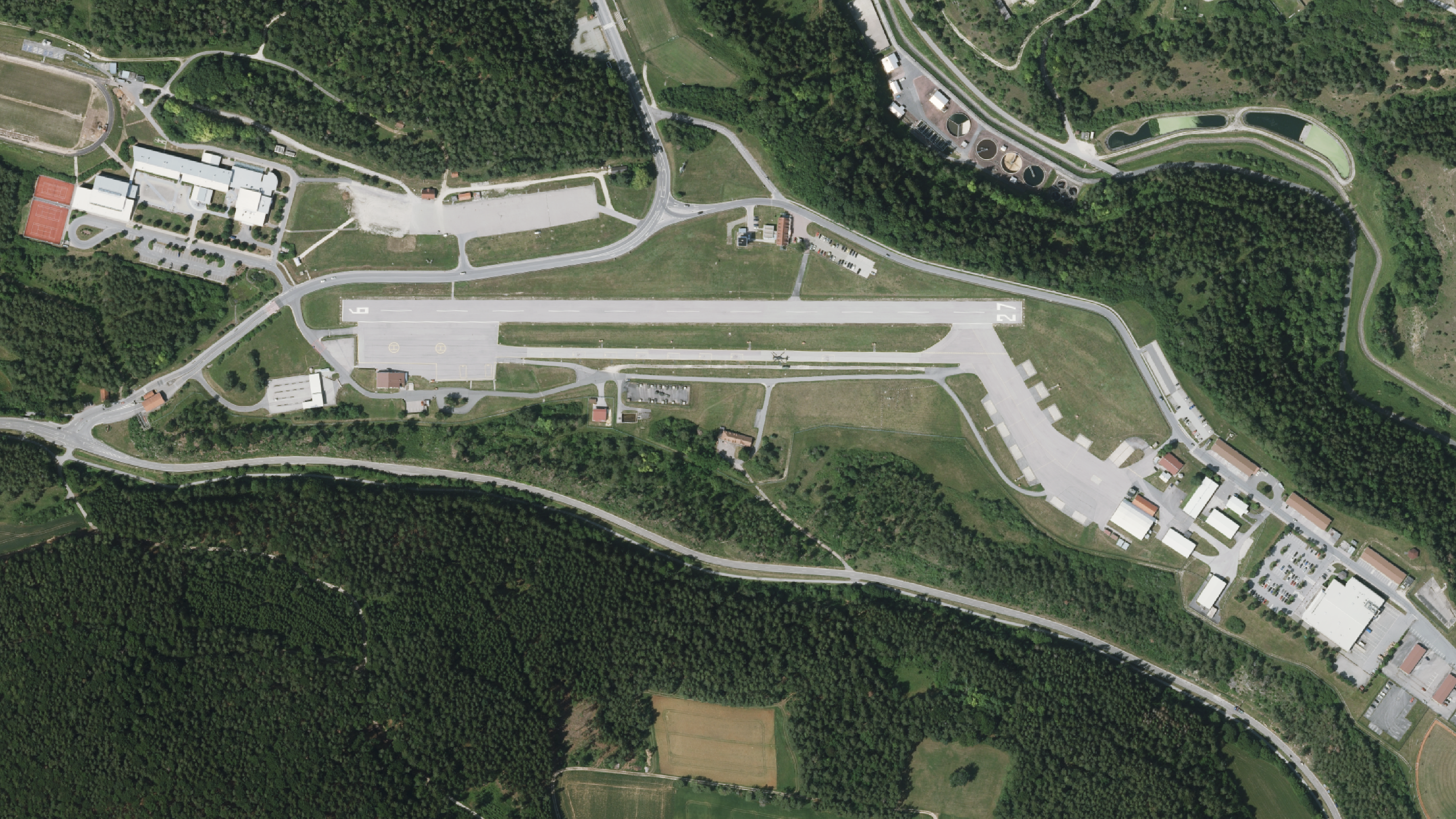
- IATA: none; ICAO: ETIH

Summary
- Airport type: Military
- Operator: United States Army
- Elevation AMSL: 1,455 ft / 443 m
- Coordinates: 49°12.99′N 11°50.17′E

Map
- Location in Germany

Runways
Direction	Length		Surface
Direction	ft	m	Surface
09/27	2,188	667	Asphalt
- Source: DoD FLIP

Hohenfels Army Airfield (ICAO: ETIH) is a military airport near Hohenfels, a small town in Bavaria, Germany. It is part of the Hohenfels Training Area, which hosts the U.S. Army's Joint Multinational Readiness Center (JMRC). As part of JMRC, the airfield is used by helicopters in support of exercises held at the Hohenfels Training Area. It is also used as a refueling stop by Army helicopters transiting through Europe.
