= 401st Army Field Support Brigade =

401st Army Field Support Brigade (AFSB)
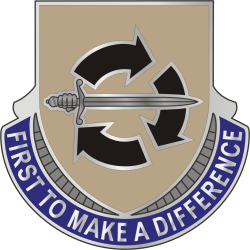
- Active: October 1997 - Present
- Country: United States
- Branch: United States Army
- Type: Support brigade
- Role: Support
- Size: Brigade
- Part of: United States Army Sustainment Command
- Garrison/HQ: Camp Arifjan, Kuwait
- Engagements: War on terror; Operation Iraqi Freedom; War in Afghanistan

Commanders
- Current commander: COL Erin Frazier
- Command Sergeant Major: CSM Emanuel T. Stephens

Insignia
- Current Parent Unit SSI

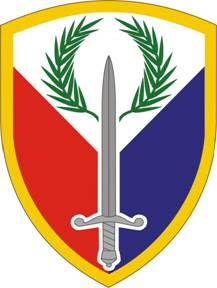
- Former SSI 2006-2010

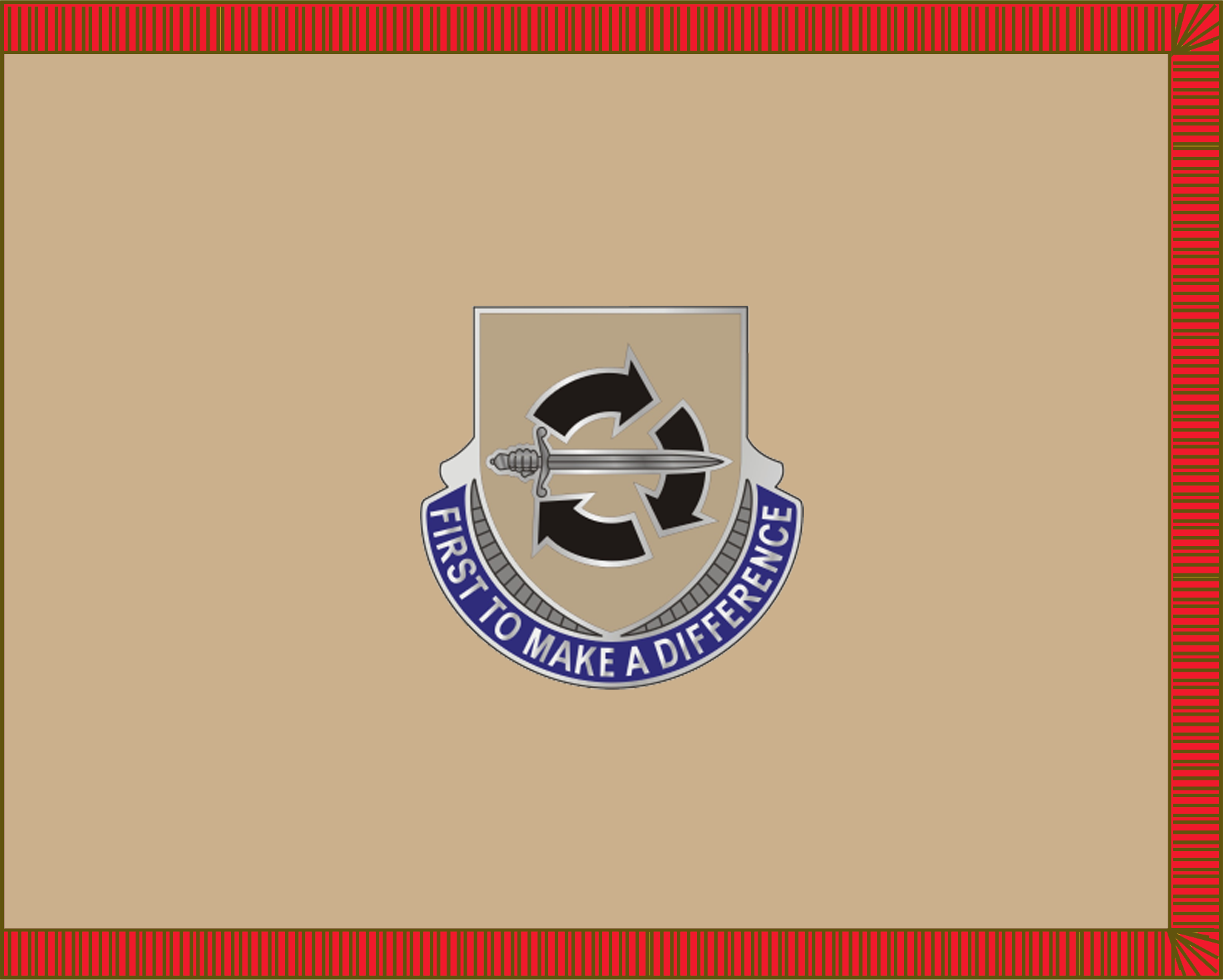
- 401st Army Field Support Brigade Flag

The 401st Army Field Support Brigade (AFSB), located at Camp Arifjan, Kuwait, after moving from Afghanistan, where it responsible for sustainment, accounting and support across Central Command’s area of responsibility in Southwest Asia.

== Organization ==
- 401st Army Field Support Brigade, at Camp Arifjan (Kuwait)
  - Army Field Support Battalion-Kuwait, at Camp Arifjan (Kuwait)
  - Army Field Support Battalion-Southwest Asia, at Camp Arifjan (Kuwait)

== History ==
The brigade's primary mission is to provide logistical and maintenance support to sustain the United States Army that is deployed in the Central Command's area of responsibility, this includes the management and overseeing of supplies, maintenance, the distribution of equipment, as well as coordinating transportation and other logistical functions.

=== Formation ===
The brigade traces its history back to the activation of the Combat Equipment Group - Southwest Asia, in October 1997. The command was formed as a result of the Chief of Staff's decision to expand the United States Army Materiel Command's responsibility for war reserve stocks to include the Persian Gulf region. While the unit created Army propositioned stock sets in Qatar, and Kuwait, it underwent a series of name and organisational changes.

When the unit assumed responsibility for the Logistics Assistance Program in Southwest Asia, the Combat Engineer Group - Southwest Asia was renamed to the current formation of the Army Field Support Battalion - Southwest Asia. The United States Army Materiel Command began to support operations in Afghanistan in October of 2001. The headquarters moved from Qatar to Kuwait in the Autumn of 2002 as part of the build-up to Operation Iraqi Freedom. The unit was re-designated as the Army Field Support Brigade - Southwest Asia on October 1, 2004, simultaneously, the unit consisted of the Brigade Headquarters in Qatar, the Army Field Support Battalion in Qatar, the Army Field Support Battalion in Kuwait, the Army Field Support Battalion in Afghanistan that was prepositioned at Kuwait Naval Base, as well as the Logistics Support Element at Camp Arifjan, Kuwait.

The Army Field Support Brigade - Southwest Asia was deactivated on October 16, 2006, when the 401st Army Field Support Brigade was activated. In 2008, the brigade headquarters was deployed to Bagram Airfield. The battalions in Kuwait and Qatar transferred to the 402nd Army Field Support Brigade in 2010 to allow the 401st to focus on operations in Afghanistan. In 2015, the 401st moved their headquarters to Camp Arifjan, Kuwait, and reintegrated their battalions from Kuwait and Qatar to their command. The 402nd then redeployed back to Hawaii.

== Former Commanders ==
From	To	Commander
2006	2007	COL Greg W. Cusimano
2007	2008	COL Dennis Thompson
2008	2009	COL Jon K. Buonerba
2009	2010	COL Richard B. Dix
2010	2011	COL Richard B. O'Connor II
2011	2013	COL Michel M. Russell, Sr.
2013	2014	COL Edward J. Burke
2014	2015	COL Matthew Ferguson
2015	2016	COL Christopher Day
2016	2017	COL Aaron M. Stanek
2017	2018	COL Carmelia J. Scott-Skillern
2018	2019	COL Jeffrey S. Niemi
2019	2020	COL Charles A. Fisher
2020	2021	COL Michael F. LaBrecque
2021	2022	COL Patrick J. McClelland
2022	2023	COL Thomas R. Boland
2023	2024	COL Misti L. Fordyma
2024	2025	COL Brandon J. Hill
2025	Present	COL Erin Frazier

== Structure ==
=== Army Field Support Brigade Kuwait ===
The Army Field Support Battalion - Kuwait, receives, maintains, and issues Army Prepositioned stocks in support of strategic requirements, provides theatre sustainment support and conducts retrograde operations for the Central Command's Area of Operations.

The battalion has a unique organisational structure in that it is composed of a team of soldiers, Department of the Army Civilians, and a contractor support base for a total workforce of more than 2,000 individuals. The battalion's missions relies heavily upon contractors which comprise 98% of the Battalion's workforce.

The subordinating unit has been known as the Army Field Support Battalion - Kuwait, since May 21, 2007. It was originally activated as the Combat Equipment Battalion - Kuwait on October 1, 1997 at Camp Doha, Kuwait.

The battalion is forwardly deployed to receive, repair, issue, and retrograde Army equipment, the battalion has directly supported units in Afghanistan, Iraq, Kuwait, and the Horn of Africa. In recent years, the battalion rebuilt the Infantry Brigade, Combat Team, retrograded over 10,000 pieces of rolling stock, executed over 1.3 million hours of direct maintenance labour, and maintained accountability for over 700,000 pieces of equipment.

==== Leadership ====
As of 2024 the battalion's leadership is as follows:

- Battalion Commander - Lieutenant Colonel, Andrew S. Horn
- Senior Enlisted Advisor - Master Sergeant, Christopher L. Jackson

=== Army Field Support Brigade Southwest Asia ===
The Army Field Support Battalion - Southwest Asia, synchronizes and integrates United States Army Materiel Command assets to focus on Operation Inherent Resolve readiness through the Theater Provided Equipment oversight and Redistribution Property Accountability Team capabilities operationalising logistical support to current and future operations and contributing to the reset of Army stocks.

The battalion also provided Brigade Logistics and Regional Logistics support teams to ensure units throughout the Combined Joint Operational Area were logistically supported. Additionally, the battalion expanded its reach into Iraq by establishing a Theater Provided Equipment retrograde and redistribution capability; culminating in a Redistribution Property Accountability Team located at Camp Taji with an additional location in Erbil being planned. It also provides the brigade the material enterprise partners a forward presence and executed critical programs and missions in support of the Regional Logistics Support Teams in Afghanistan. These included tasks such as providing oversight of maintenance operations in support of contracts in Iraq, support for the Coalition and American forces, Responsible Retrograde, consolidation and rightsizing of the force, equipment, and materiel, Theater Provided Equipment, Logistics Assistance Program, and support to Kuwait, Iraq, and Syria.

The unit was reflagged during a ceremony at Camp Arifjan with Lieutenant Colonel Timothy Maples assuming command alongside Sergeant Major Sean Shea assuming responsibility on February 7, 2018. The original Headquarters was established at Camp Buehring, Kuwait, with five Army Sustainment Command soldiers mobilised as a combination of Active Duty, Army Reservists, and National Guardsmen assumed mission command of both Logistic Support Elements in Kuwait and Iraq, tasked with providing material and maintenance support to maximising mission readiness.

==== Leadership ====
As of 2024, the battalion's leadership is as follows:

- Battalion Commander - Lieutenant Colonel, Waldrell J. Thomas
- Senior Enlisted Advisor - Master Sergeant, Jason M. Penfold
