= Grand Island Army Air Field =

Operating 1942 to 1946

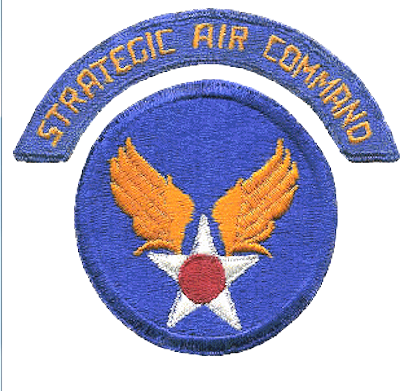
Grand Island Army Airfield
- Part of Strategic Air Command
- Hall County, near Grand Island, Nebraska
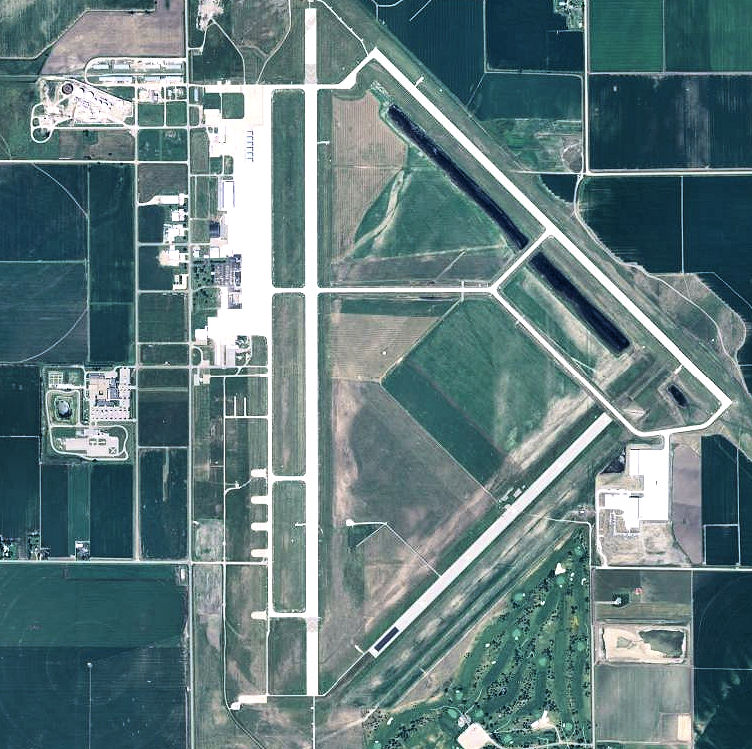
- 2006 USGS Orthophoto

Site information
- Type: Air Force Base

Location
- Coordinates: 40°58′03″N 98°18′35″W

Site history
- Built: 1942
- In use: 1942-1946

Grand Island Army Airfield (IATA: GRI, ICAO: KGRI, FAA LID: GRI) was a United States Army Air Forces airfield which operated from 1942 to 1946. After its closure, the base was reopened as Central Nebraska Regional Airport.

== History ==
Grand Island Army Airfield was opened in 1942, and was one of eleven USAAF training bases in Nebraska during World War II. A portion of the 2,125-acre (8.60 km^{2}) site was a former national defense airport. The site is bordered on all sides by farm ground. The Army Airfield was constructed, in part, over the pre-existing Grand Island Arrasmith Airport. To convert the existing airport into a military airfield, 173 buildings and structures were constructed at Grand Island Army Airfield.

The airfield was activated on 1 April 1943, under the command of Second Air Force Headquarters, Colorado Springs Army Air Base, Colorado. It was used in the early part of the war to train bomber air crews. Later in the war, the field was a staging area for bomber crews preparing for assignments in Guam and Tinian in the Pacific Theater of Operations. It was also a Strategic Air Command base in 1946. Major engine and airframe repair facilities were available for B-17 Flying Fortress and B-29 Superfortress bombers. One bombardment training wing (Second Air Force), and three bombardment groups (Twentieth Air Force) were attached to Grand Island during the war.

The 242nd (Operational Training Unit, Very Heavy) of the 17th Bombardment Training Wing commanded the support elements at Grand Island AAF as part of Air Technical Service Command.

Known B-29 Superfortress units that trained at Grand Island AAF were:

- 6th Bombardment Group (18 May - 19 November 1944)

24th, 39th and 40th Bombardment Squadrons
Deployed to Twentieth Air Force, Tinian

- 502d Bombardment Group (26 September 1944 – 7 April 1945)

402nd, 411th, and 430th Bombardment Squadrons
Deployed to Twentieth Air Force, Guam

- 376th Bombardment Group (25 June - 10 November 1945)

512th, 513th, 514th, and 515th Bombardment Squadrons
Inactivated 10 November 1945

- 449th Bombardment Group (8 September 1945 – 4 August 1946)

716th, 717th, 718th, and 719th Bombardment Squadrons
Assigned to Strategic Air Command at Grand Island AAF
Inactivated 4 August 1946

- 28th Bombardment Group (4 August 1946 – 6 October 1946)

77th, 717th, and 718th Bombardment Squadrons
Assigned personnel and equipment from inactivated 449th Bombardment Group, reassigned to Elmendorf AAF Alaska.

With the departure of the B-29 units the USAAF closed Grand Island Army Airfield on 31 October 1946. The facility was turned over to the City of Grand Island for use as a municipal airport and industrial park.

However the military use of the base did not end entirely. During the 1960s, Grand Island Regional Airport was utilized by Convair F-102 Delta Darts of the 328th Fighter Wing, 326th Fighter-Interceptor Squadron (Air Defense) of Air Defense Command as a dispersal base. These aircraft were deployed from Richards-Gebaur Air Force Base outside of Kansas City, Missouri. These dispersal flights ended in 1968.

Today, about a dozen military buildings still exist at Central Nebraska Regional Airport including several aircraft hangars, some former warehouses being used for commercial storage and several sheds along with the old parachute building.

== See also ==
- Nebraska World War II Army Airfields
