= Finance Corps =

U.S. Army branch charged with financial operations

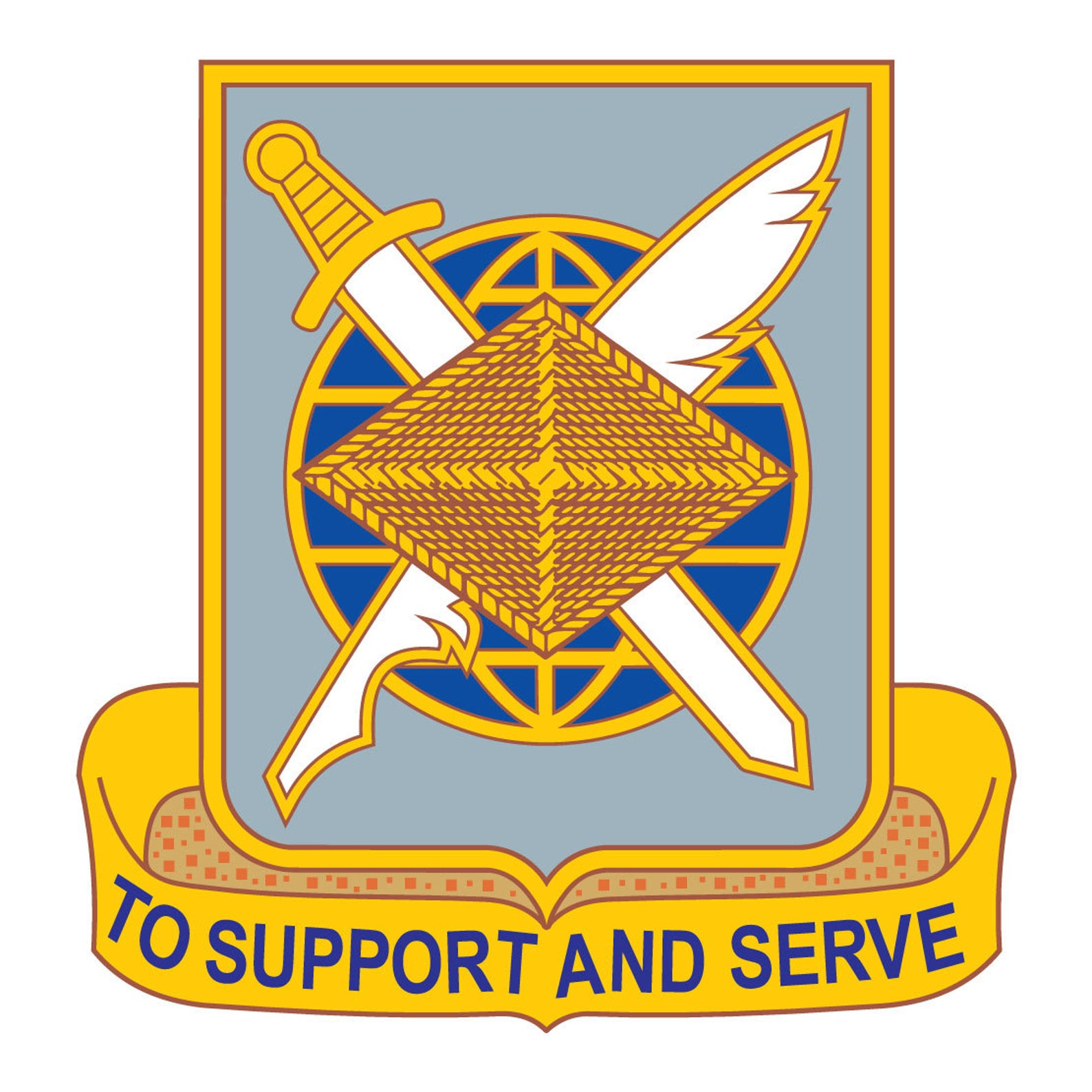
- Distinctive unit insignia
- Active: 16 June 1775 – present
- Country: United States of America
- Branch: United States Army
- Part of: U.S. Army Materiel Command
- Mottos: "To Support and Serve"
- Engagements: American Revolutionary War; American Civil War; World War I World War II; Korean War; Vietnam War; Operation Desert Storm; Operation Enduring Freedom; Operation Iraqi Freedom

Commanders
- Current commander: COL Michelle M. Williams, Commander of U.S. Army Financial Management Command

Insignia
- Branch insignia

The United States Army Finance Corps is a combat service support (CSS) branch of the United States Army. The Finance Corps traces its foundation to 16 June 1775, when the Second Continental Congress established the office of Paymaster General of the Army. The Pay Department became a separate department in 1816, and the Finance Department was created by law on 1 July 1920. It became the Finance Corps in 1950. It is responsible for financial operations, most notably payroll and resource management.

== Finance Corps units ==
Corps-level financial management formations exist in Europe, South Korea, as well as at Fort Bragg, North Carolina, and at Fort Hood, Texas.

The 18th Financial Management Support Center (18 FMSC) provides financial management services to the units of the XVIII Airborne Corps. It is based at Fort Bragg, North Carolina and its higher headquarters (HQ) is the 1st Theater Sustainment Command (1st TSC) Fort Bragg, North Carolina. The 18th FMSC is responsible for the 24th Financial Management Company (FMCO), the 33rd FMCO, the 82nd FMCO, the 101st FMCO, and the 126th FMCO. The mission of the 18th Financial Management Center is:

- Rapidly deploy as part of the crisis response force by air, sea and land anywhere in the world.
- Provide financial management support for joint and combined operations (Central Funding, Disbursing, Accounting, Vendor Services, Policy and Internal Controls).
- Provide technical oversight and coordination to designated CONUS-based Financial Management Companies preparing to deploy in concert with the Army Force Generation Cycle.
- Direct employment of non-deployed FM Companies in support of the Installation finance mission in accordance with Assistant Secretary of the Army (Financial Management and Comptroller) (ASA FM&C) guidance

In early 1998 the Commanding General of United States Army Forces Command approved a request from the CG, XVIII Airborne Corps to combine the 18th Finance Group and the 18th Personnel Group (Airborne); to establish a provisional 18th Soldier Support Group (18th SSG) at Ft. Hood; to form SSBs at Forts Stewart, Drum and Campbell; and, to combine the two remaining Finance Battalions at Ft. Bragg. The General Officer Steering Committee (GOSC) did not support the XVIII consolidations as proposed. This decision was made without the benefit of the TRADOC force development process which was Phase 2 of the Service to the Soldier Study. It was not a foregone conclusion that SSBs and SSGs would be implemented Army-Wide. FORSCOM and XVIII Airborne Corps were forging ahead of the Soldier Support Institute study as it was expedient to do so due to the impending force reductions.

Other higher finance formations include:

- 13th Finance Group, Fort Cavazos (III Corps)
  - 1st Finance Battalion
  - 4th Finance Battalion
  - 15th Finance Battalion
  - 215th Finance Battalion
- 266th Finance Support Center (United States Army Europe)
  - 208th Finance Management Company
  - Italy and Benelux offices
- 175th Finance Center (Yongsan, South Korea) (Eighth United States Army)
- 3rd Finance Group
- 5th Finance Group
- 7th Finance Group
- 9th Finance Group
- 220th Finance Group

=== Battalions and sections ===
- 9th Finance Battalion
- 24th Finance Battalion
- 25th Infantry Division Finance Section
- 27th Finance Battalion
- 30th Finance Battalion
- 39th Finance Battalion
- 49th Finance Battalion
- 82nd Finance Battalion
- 101st Finance Battalion
- 105th Finance Battalion
- 106th Finance Battalion
- 107th Finance Battalion
- 125th Finance Battalion
- 126th Finance Battalion
- 126th Finance Section
- 130th Finance Battalion
- 147th Finance Battalion
- 158th Finance Battalion
- 176th Finance Battalion
- 177th Finance Battalion
- 230th Finance Battalion
- 267th Finance Battalion
- 325th Finance Battalion
- 338th Finance Battalion
- 374th Finance Battalion
- 376th Finance Battalion
- 395th Finance Battalion
- 453rd Finance Battalion
- 501st Finance Battalion
- 369th Finance Battalion

=== Army National Guard ===
- 27th Finance Battalion (NYARNG)
- 28th Finance Battalion (PAARNG)
- 40th Finance Battalion (CAARNG)
- 49th Finance Battalion (TXARNG)
- 50th Finance Battalion (NJARNG)
- 138th Finance Battalion (INARNG)
- 153rd Finance Battalion (FLARNG)
- 210th Finance Battalion (MSARNG)
- 726th Finance Battalion (MAARNG)
- 93rd Financial Management Support Unit (GA)
- 149th Financial Management Support Unit (TXARNG)
- 249th Financial Management Support Unit (TXARNG)
- 224th Financial Management Support Unit (CAARNG)
- 374th Financial Management Support Unit (MDARNG)
- 376th Financial Management Support Unit (WIARNG)
- 395th Financial Management Support Unit (UTARNG)
- 147th Financial Management Support Detachment (MNARNG)
- 247th Financial Management Support Detachment (MNARNG)
- 1863rd Financial Management Support Detachment (ILARNG)

=== Army Reserve ===
Centers:

- 326th Financial Management Support Center, in Los Angeles (CA)
- 336th Financial Management Support Center, in Lake Charles (LA)
- 398th Financial Management Support Center, at Fort Belvoir (VA)
- 469th Financial Management Support Center, in New Orleans (LA)

Units:

- 368th Financial Management Support Unit, in Wichita (KS)
  - Detachment 2, 368th Financial Management Support Unit, in Lawrence (KS)
- 374th Financial Management Support Unit, in Newark (DE)
  - Detachment 1, 374th Financial Management Support Unit, in Owings Mills (MD)
  - Detachment 2, 374th Financial Management Support Unit, at Fort Belvoir (VA)
  - Detachment 3, 374th Financial Management Support Unit, at Fort Lee (VA)
  - Detachment 4, 374th Financial Management Support Unit, in New Cumberland (PA)
- 376th Financial Management Support Unit, in Wausau (WI)
- 395th Financial Management Support Unit, at Fort Douglas (UT)

Detachments:

- 389th Financial Management Support Detachment, at Fort Buchanan (PR)
- 398th Financial Management Support Detachment, at Fort Buchanan (PR)
- 413th Financial Management Support Detachment, at Fort Buchanan (PR)

== List of commanders ==
No.	Commanding General		Term		
No.	Portrait	Name	Took office	Left office	Duration
-	Paul A. Chamberlain	Lieutenant General; Paul A. Chamberlain	March 2016	October 25, 2019	~3 years, 214 days
-	Mark S. Bennett	Brigadier General; Mark S. Bennett	October 25, 2019	May 7, 2021	1 year, 194 days
-	Barry W. Hoffman	Barry W. Hoffman; Acting	May 7, 2021	July 15, 2021	69 days
-	Paige M. Jennings	Brigadier General; Paige M. Jennings	July 15, 2021	June 18, 2024	2 years, 339 days
-	Michelle M. Williams	Colonel; Michelle M. Williams	June 18, 2024	Incumbent	2 years, 130 days
