= 361st Civil Affairs Brigade =

- Active: 1966-2023
- Country: United States
- Branch: US Army Reserve
- Role: Civil Affairs
- Size: Brigade
- Garrison/HQ: Kaiserslautern, Germany
- Motto: Secure Peace

Commanders
- Final Commander: Col. Carlos E. Gorbea

Insignia
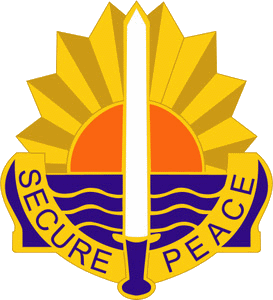
- 361st Civil Affairs Brigade DUI

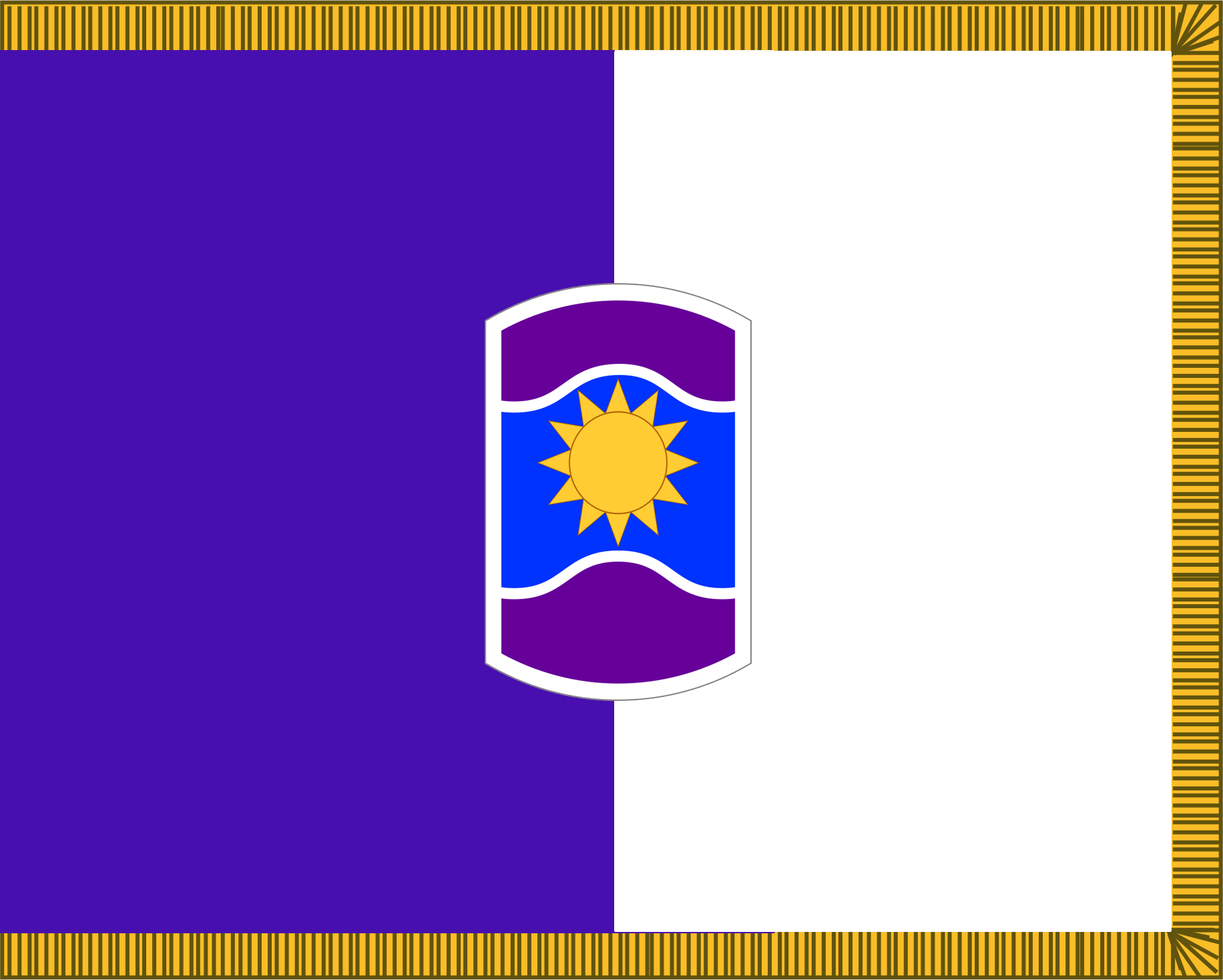
- 361st Civil Affairs Brigade Flag

The 361st Civil Affairs Brigade (United States) was a unit of the US Army Reserve until September 9, 2023. The unit was created in 1966 as the HHC, 361st Civil Affairs Area in Pensacola, Florida. In 1975 the unit was redesignated HHC, 361st Civil Affairs Brigade. In 2010, the unit and it's subordinate battalion moved to Kaiserslautern, Germany as a part of the 7th Mission Support Command. In 2023, the unit was deactivated at Daenner Kaserne in a ceremony led by the commander of the 7th MSC.

== Subordinate Units ==
457th Civil Affairs Battalion - Kaiserslautern, Germany
