= 408th =

408th may refer to:

- 408th Armament Systems Group, inactive United States Air Force unit
- 408th Bombardment Squadron, inactive United States Air Force unit
- 408th Support Brigade (United States), support brigade of the United States Army

== See also ==
- 408 (number)
- 408, the year 408 (CDVIII) of the Julian calendar
- 408 BC
