= United States Army Contracting Command =

U.S. Army's provider of contracting services

Army Contracting Command
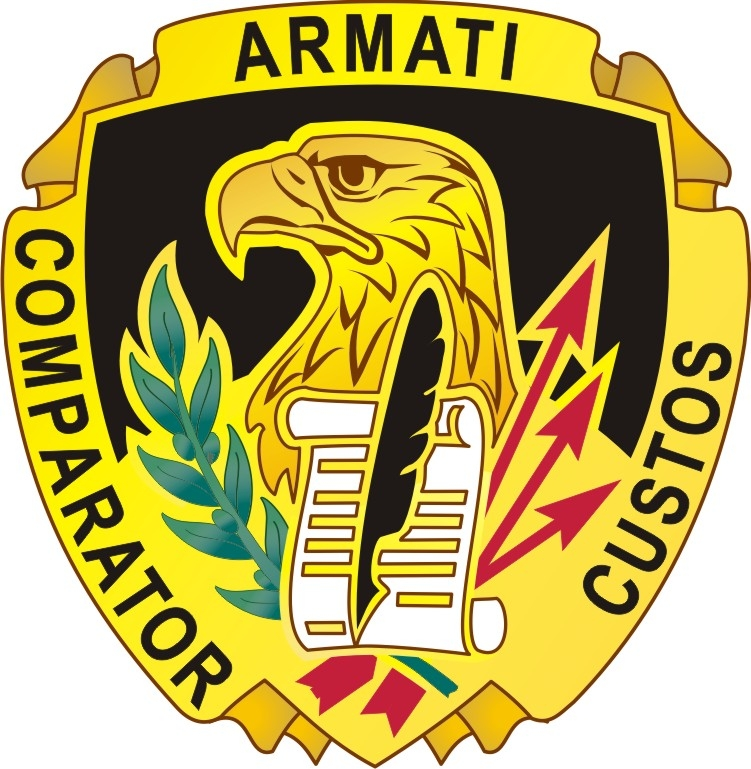
- ACC distinctive unit insignia
- Active: 2008–present
- Country: United States
- Branch: United States Army
- Role: Arranging contracts
- Part of: U.S. Army Materiel Command
- Garrison/HQ: Redstone Arsenal, Alabama
- Mottos: Armati, Comparator, Custos (Latin) ("Soldier, Emptor, Guardian")
- Website: Official website

Commanders
- Current commander: MG Douglas S. Lowrey

The United States Army Contracting Command (ACC) is a command of the United States Army that provides contracting services. Headquartered on Redstone Arsenal, Alabama, the ACC is a component of the U.S. Army Materiel Command.

The elements of Army Contracting Command are: the contracting centers, the contracting support brigades, a contracting battalion, and the Mission and Installation Contracting Command (MICC) and its assigned units.

== History ==
In January 2002, the secretary of the army and the chief of staff of the army (CSA) directed the assistant secretary of the army for acquisition, logistics and technology (ASA(ALT)) to begin planning for the formation of an army contracting agency.

On October 1, 2002, the Army established the U.S. Army Contracting Agency (ACA)—a field operating agency (FOA) under the office of ASA(ALT). The ACA was headquartered in Falls Church, Virginia.

One of the ACA’s primary functions was to provide contracting support for contingency operations. The Army Contracting Agency received responsibility for contracting in support of the "missions" of the following units: the Army Forces Command, the Army Training and Doctrine Command, and the Army Military District of Washington.

The agency also provided contracting support for the IT and commercial products of the Army Chief Information Officer/G-6, the Army Network Enterprise Technology Command, and the Army Program Executive Office, Enterprise Information Systems. An ACA component was formed for this purpose, the Information Technology E-Commerce and Commercial Contracting Center (ITEC4).

The Army Contracting Agency received the information management and installation-related contracting functions of the following specialty commands:

- the Army Materiel Command,
- the Military Traffic Management Command,
- the Army Corps of Engineers,
- the National Guard,
- the Army Medical Command,
- the Army Medical Research and Materiel Command,
- the Army Space and Missile Defense Command, and
- the Army Intelligence and Security Command.

Said specialty commands retained their existing contracting functions (including contingency contracting), while the information management and certain installation-related missions were tasked to the ACA.

=== Transition to command ===
On October 1, 2008, the U.S. Army Contracting Command (ACC) was established. The ACC incorporated the contracting mission of the Army Contracting Agency. The ACC was headquartered at Fort Belvoir, Virginia, and was designated a major subordinate command of the U.S. Army Materiel Command (AMC).

ACC became responsible for a majority of the contracting work of the U.S. Army. Initially, it consisted of two subordinate commands, responsible for installation and expeditionary contracting, along with other contracting elements.

=== Consolidation of Army Contracting Command-New Jersey ===
ACC-New Jersey (ACC-NJ), including its mission to arrange ammunition contracts, was officially incorporated into ACC-Rock Island (ACC-RI) on May 4, 2026. ACC-RI became responsible for contracting services in armaments and ammunition programs. According to the Army, a munitions program that was ready for transition from research and development to full-scale production previously required handoffs between different contracting centers. These handoffs between contracting centers had potential to cause delays, and reportedly were mitigated by consolidating ACC-NJ into ACC-RI.

== Organizational structure ==
=== Contracting centers ===
- Army Contracting Command-Aberdeen Proving Ground (ACC-APG) – Aberdeen Proving Ground, Maryland
- Army Contracting Command-Detroit Arsenal (ACC-DTA) – Detroit Arsenal, Michigan
- Army Contracting Command-Orlando (ACC-ORL) – Orlando, Florida
- Army Contracting Command-Redstone Arsenal (ACC-RSA) – Redstone Arsenal, Alabama
- Army Contracting Command-Rock Island (ACC-RI) – Rock Island Arsenal, Illinois

=== Contracting support brigades ===
- 408th Contracting Support Brigade – Shaw Air Force Base, South Carolina and Camp Arifjan, Kuwait
- 409th Contracting Support Brigade – Sembach Kaserne, Germany
- 411th Contracting Support Brigade – Camp Humphreys, Korea
- 413th Contracting Support Brigade – Fort Shafter, Hawaii
- 414th Contracting Support Brigade – Vicenza, Italy

=== Direct reporting contracting battalion ===
- 905th Contracting Battalion – Fort Bragg, North Carolina

=== Mission and Installation Contracting Command ===
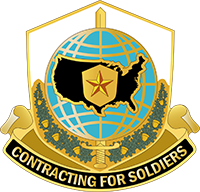
MICC distinctive unit insignia

Mission and Installation Contracting Command (MICC) is a one-star command headquartered at Joint Base San Antonio, Texas, responsible for mission and installation-related contracting services for the U.S. Army. It is a component of the U.S. Army Contracting Command.

MICC is made up of approximately 1,500 employees (military and civilian), and is assigned a number of units: two contracting support brigades (CSBs), two field directorate offices (FDOs), and 33 field offices throughout the nation and Puerto Rico, which provide contracting support for the U.S. Army.

The MICC was initially established as the Installation Contracting Command (ICC) on October 1, 2008. One day later, however, the ICC was redesignated as the Mission and Installation Contracting Command (MICC), retaining the same mission and functions.

Headquarters:

- MICC headquarters, Joint Base San Antonio, Texas

Contracting support brigades (CSBs), field directorate offices (FDOs), and related elements:

- 418th Contracting Support Brigade – Fort Hood, Texas
  - MICC-Fort Bliss/919th Contracting Battalion – Fort Bliss, Texas
  - MICC-Fort Carson/918th Contracting Battalion – Fort Carson, Colorado
  - MICC-Dugway Proving Ground – Dugway Proving Ground, Utah
  - MICC-Fort Irwin – Fort Irwin, California
  - MICC-Joint Base Lewis-McChord – Joint Base Lewis-McChord, Washington
  - MICC-Fort Polk – Fort Polk, Louisiana
  - MICC-Fort Riley/923rd Contracting Battalion – Fort Riley, Kansas
  - MICC-Fort Rucker/901st Contracting Battalion – Fort Rucker, Texas
  - MICC-Yuma Proving Ground – Yuma, Arizona
- 419th Contracting Support Brigade – Fort Bragg, North Carolina
  - MICC-Fort Bragg/900th Contracting Battalion and 905th Contracting Battalion – Fort Bragg, North Carolina
  - MICC-Fort Campbell/922nd Contracting Battalion – Fort Campbell, Kentucky
  - MICC-Fort Drum/925th Contracting Battalion – Fort Drum, New York
  - MICC-Fort Jackson – Fort Jackson, South Carolina
  - MICC-Fort McCoy – Fort McCoy, Wisconsin
  - MICC-Fort Stewart/904th Contracting Battalion – Fort Stewart, Georgia
- Field Directorate Office-Fort Eustis – Joint Base Langley-Eustis, Virginia
  - MICC-Carlisle Barracks – Carlisle, Pennsylvania
  - MICC-Fort Benning – Fort Benning, Georgia
  - MICC-Fort Eustis – Joint Base Langley-Eustis, Virginia
  - MICC-Fort Gordon – Fort Gordon, Georgia
  - MICC-Fort Leavenworth – Fort Leavenworth, Kansas
  - MICC-Fort Lee – Fort Lee, Virginia
  - MICC-Fort Leonard Wood – Fort Leonard Wood, Missouri
  - MICC-Fort Rucker – Fort Rucker, Alabama
  - MICC-Fort Sill – Fort Sill, Oklahoma
  - MICC-West Point, West Point, New York
- Field Directorate Office-Fort Sam Houston – Joint Base San Antonio, Texas
  - Installation Readiness Center
  - Government Purchase Card Program Management Directorate
  - MICC-Fort Belvoir – Fort Belvoir, Virginia
  - MICC-Fort Knox – Fort Knox, Kentucky
  - MICC-Fort Sam Houston – Joint Base San Antonio, Texas

== Former elements ==
=== Expeditionary Contracting Command ===
Expeditionary Contracting Command (ECC) was a one-star command active from 2008 to 2017 and responsible for expeditionary contracting. Headquartered most recently at Redstone Arsenal, Alabama, the ECC was a major subordinate command of the U.S. Army Contracting Command.

The ECC consisted of the following units: nine contracting support brigades (CSBs), seventeen contingency contracting battalions, sixteen senior contingency contracting teams, and ninety-two contingency contracting teams.

The Expeditionary Contracting Command was discontinued and merged with the Army Contracting Command on October 1, 2017.

Assigned contracting brigades and contracting support brigades (approximately in the mid-2010s):

- 408th Contracting Support Brigade – Camp Arifjan, Kuwait
- 409th Contracting Support Brigade – Kaiserslautern, Germany
- 410th Contracting Brigade – Fort Sam Houston, Texas
- 411th Contracting Brigade – Yongsan, Korea
- 412th Contracting Brigade – Fort Sam Houston, Texas
- 413th Contracting Brigade – Fort Shafter, Hawaii
- 414th Contracting Brigade – Vicenza, Italy
- 418th Contracting Support Brigade – Fort Hood, Texas
- 419th Contracting Support Brigade – Fort Bragg, North Carolina

=== 412th Contracting Support Brigade ===
The 412th Contracting Support Brigade was responsible for contracting operations in and around Joint Base San Antonio, Texas. The 412th CSB was deactivated in 2017, and replaced by a field directorate office (FDO).

Organization:

- 412th Contracting Support Brigade, Joint Base San Antonio, Texas
  - MICC-Joint Base San Antonio-Fort Sam Houston, Joint Base San Antonio, Texas
  - MICC-Fort Buchanan, Fort Buchanan, Puerto Rico
  - MICC-Fort Jackson, Fort Jackson, South Carolina
  - MICC-Fort Knox, Fort Knox, Kentucky
  - MICC-Fort McCoy, Fort McCoy, Wisconsin
  - MICC-Moffett Field, Moffett Field, California

== Insignia ==
=== Distinctive unit insignia ===
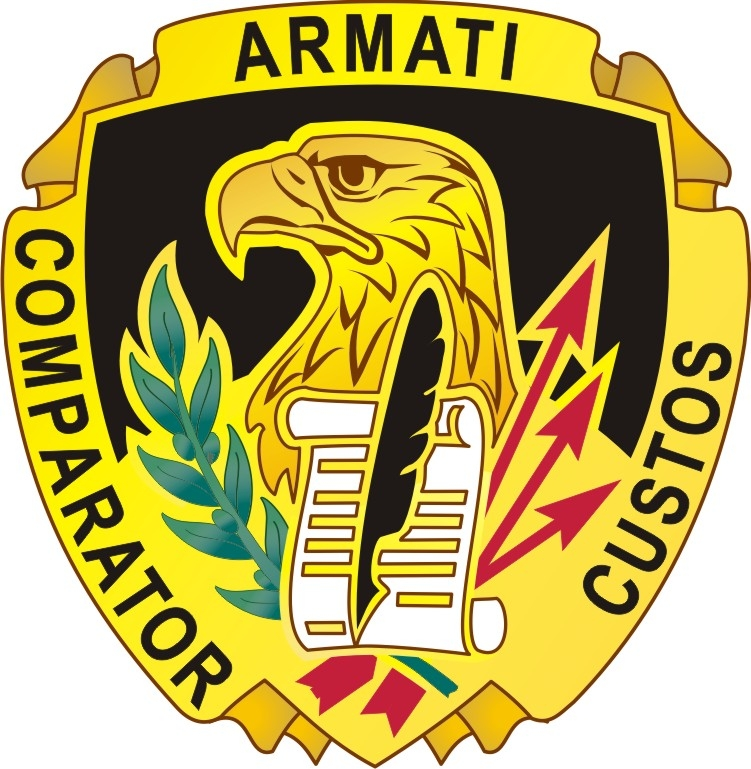
ACC distinctive unit insignia

The distinctive unit insignia of the U.S. Army Contracting Command was approved by the Institute of Heraldry on June 23, 2008.

The olive branch and arrows represent the command's contracting mission, in peacetime and wartime. The eagle symbolizes strength and vigilance. The motto "Armati, Comparator, Custos" (Latin) roughly translates to "Soldier, Emptor, Guardian". An alternate interpretation is "Soldiers guarding soldiers through careful purchase."

== List of commanders ==
No.	Commander		Term		
No.	Portrait	Name	Took office	Left office	Duration
Executive Director, U.S. Army Contracting Command
1	Jeffrey P. Parsons	Jeffrey P. Parsons	March 13, 2008	September 27, 2011	3 years, 198 days
2	Carol E. Lowman	Carol E. Lowman	September 27, 2011	May 17, 2012	233 days
Commanding General, U.S. Army Contracting Command
1	Camille M. Nichols	Major General; Camille M. Nichols	May 17, 2012	October 2, 2013	1 year, 138 days
2	Theodore Harrison III	Major General; Theodore Harrison III	October 2, 2013	August 19, 2015	1 year, 321 days
3	James E. Simpson	Major General; James E. Simpson	August 19, 2015	May 31, 2018	2 years, 285 days
4	Paul H. Pardew	Major General; Paul H. Pardew	May 31, 2018	June 21, 2021	3 years, 21 days
5	Christine A. Beeler	Brigadier General; Christine A. Beeler	June 21, 2021	June 14, 2024	2 years, 359 days
6	Douglas S. Lowrey	Major General; Douglas S. Lowrey	June 14, 2024	Incumbent	2 years, 134 days
