= Thomas Horlander =

U.S. Army general

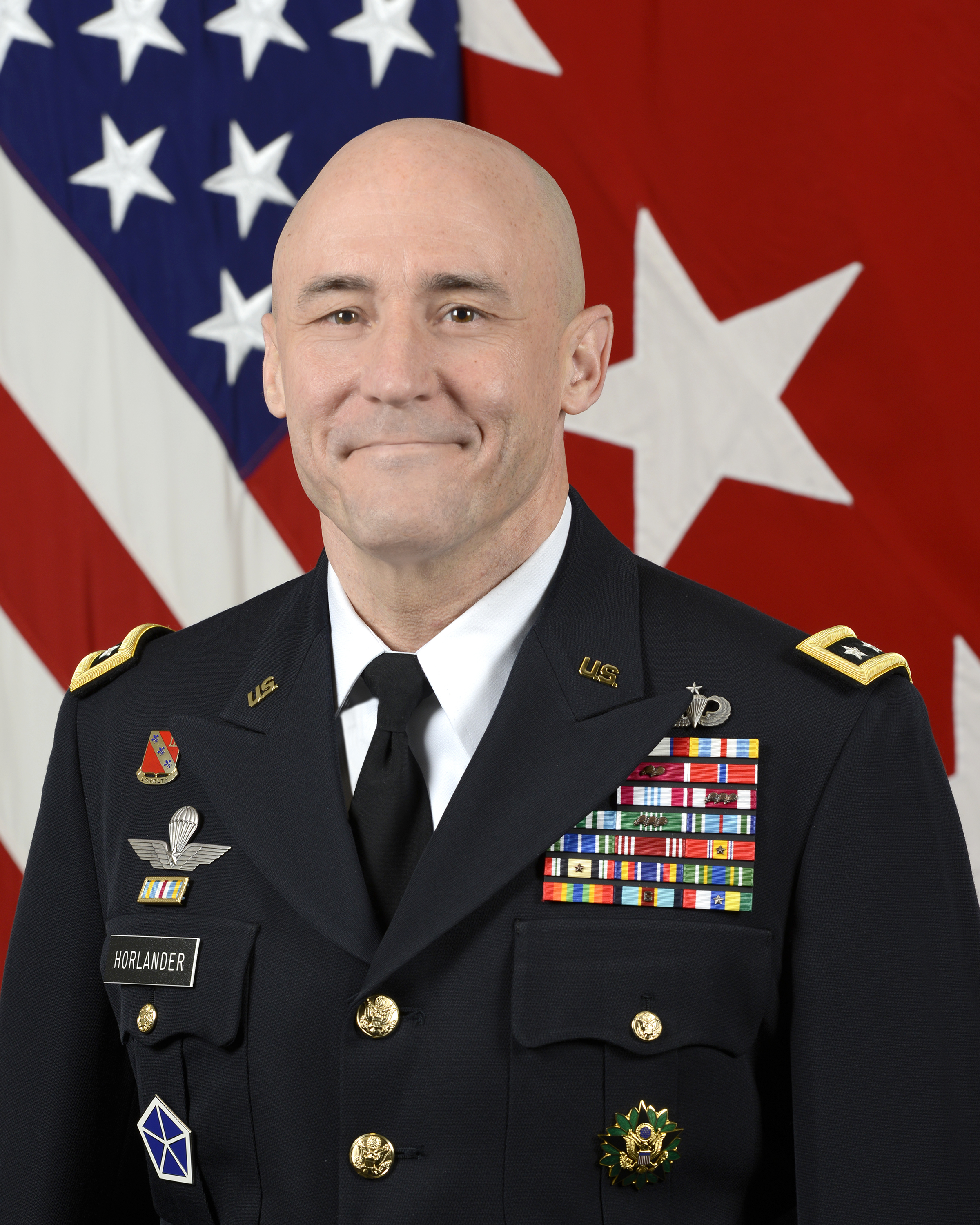
- Born: Aurora, Colorado
- Military career
- Allegiance: United States
- Branch: United States Army
- Service years: 1983–2021
- Rank: Lieutenant General
- Conflicts: Iraq War
- Awards: Army Distinguished Service Medal; Defense Superior Service Medal; Legion of Merit (3); Bronze Star Medal

Thomas A. Horlander is a retired United States Army lieutenant general who most recently served as the Military Deputy for Budget to the Assistant Secretary of the Army for Financial Management & Comptroller from August 2, 2017, to August 2021. Previously, he served as the Director for Army Budget of the Office of the Assistant Secretary of the Army for Financial Management & Comptroller.

== Dates of rank ==
Rank	Date
Brigadier General	August 3, 2009
Major General	July 15, 2013
Lieutenant General	August 3, 2017

Military offices
Preceded by Edward P. Donnelly Jr.	Director for Business Operations of the Office of Business Transformation; 2013–2014	Succeeded by Camille M. Nichols
Preceded by Karen E. Dyson	Director for Army Budget of the Office of the Assistant Secretary of the Army for Financial Management & Comptroller; 2014–2017	Succeeded by Paul A. Chamberlain
Preceded by Karen E. Dyson	Military Deputy for Budget to the Assistant Secretary of the Army for Financial Management & Comptroller; 2017–2021	Succeeded by Paul A. Chamberlain
