= Paul A. Chamberlain =

U.S. Army general

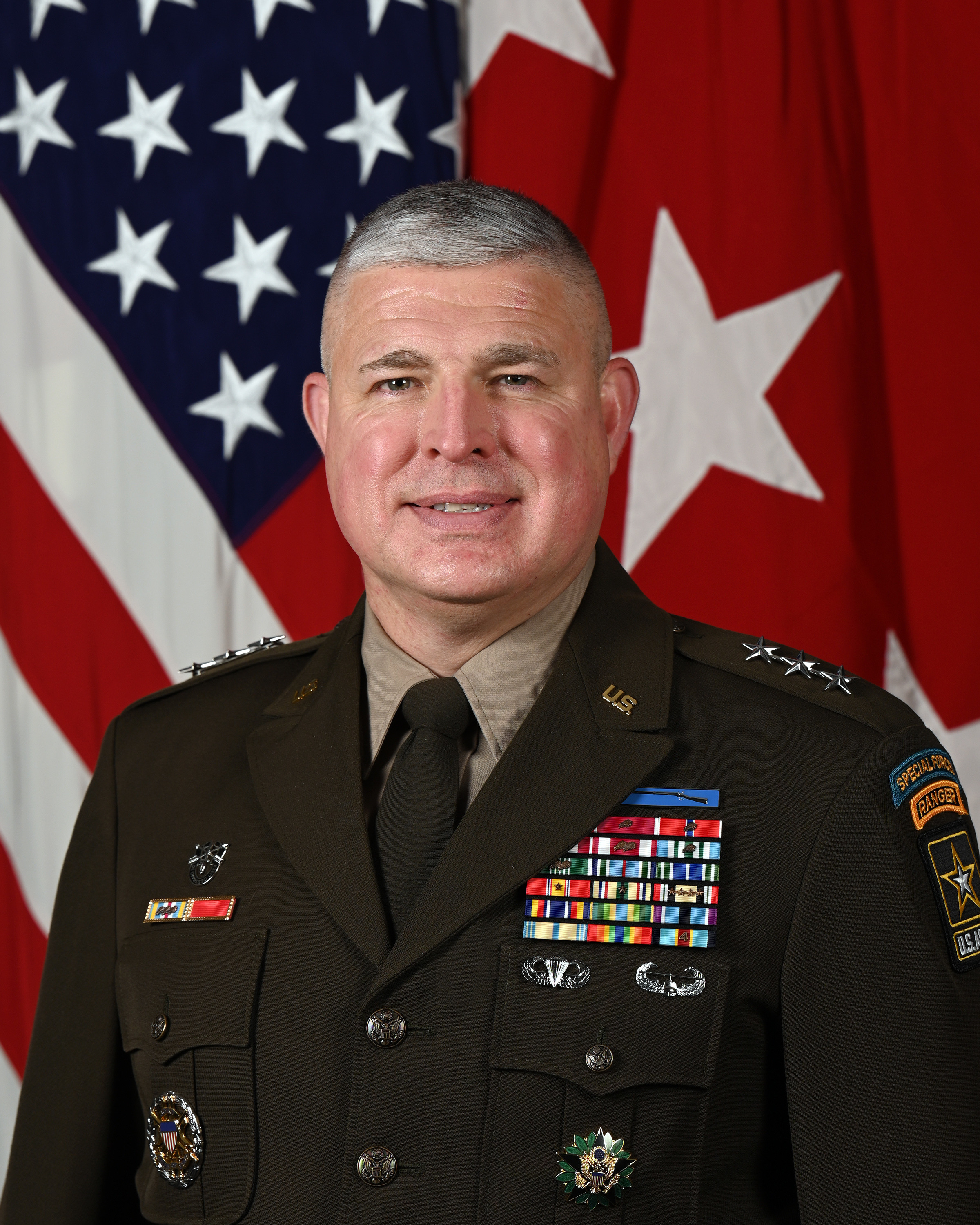
- Official portrait, 2021
- Military career
- Allegiance: United States
- Branch: United States Army
- Service years: 1988–2025
- Rank: Lieutenant General
- Commands: United States Army Soldier Support Institute

Paul A. Chamberlain is a retired United States Army lieutenant general who last served as the military deputy for budget to the Assistant Secretary of the Army (Financial Management and Comptroller) from 2021 to 2025. He previously served as director for army budget of the United States Army from 2017 to 2021, and as the deputy chief of staff for programs and director of resource management of United States Army Central.

In June 2021, he was nominated and confirmed for promotion to lieutenant general and assignment as the next military deputy for budget to the Assistant Secretary of the Army (Financial Management and Comptroller), succeeding the retiring Thomas Horlander. He was promoted to his present rank on 2 August 2021.

Military offices
Preceded by David C. Coburn	Deputy Chief of Staff for Programs and Director of Resource Management of the United States Army Central; 2015–2017	Succeeded by Kenneth D. Hubbard
Preceded by Thomas A. Horlander	Director for Army Budget of the United States Army; 2017–2021	Succeeded by Mark S. Bennett
Preceded by Thomas A. Horlander	Military Deputy for Budget to the Assistant Secretary of the Army (Financial Management and Comptroller); 2021–2025	Succeeded by Mark S. Bennett
