= 413th Contracting Support Brigade =

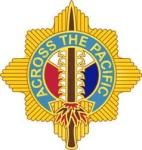
- Active: 2009-present
- Country: United States
- Branch: US Army
- Role: Support
- Size: Brigade
- Garrison/HQ: Fort Shafter, Hawaii
- Motto: Across The Pacific
- Website: https://www.facebook.com/413thContractingSupportBrigade/

Commanders
- Current commander: COL James Burkes
- Command Sergeant Major: CSM Julio Calzada

Insignia
- Current SSI

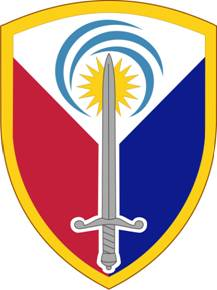
- Former SSI

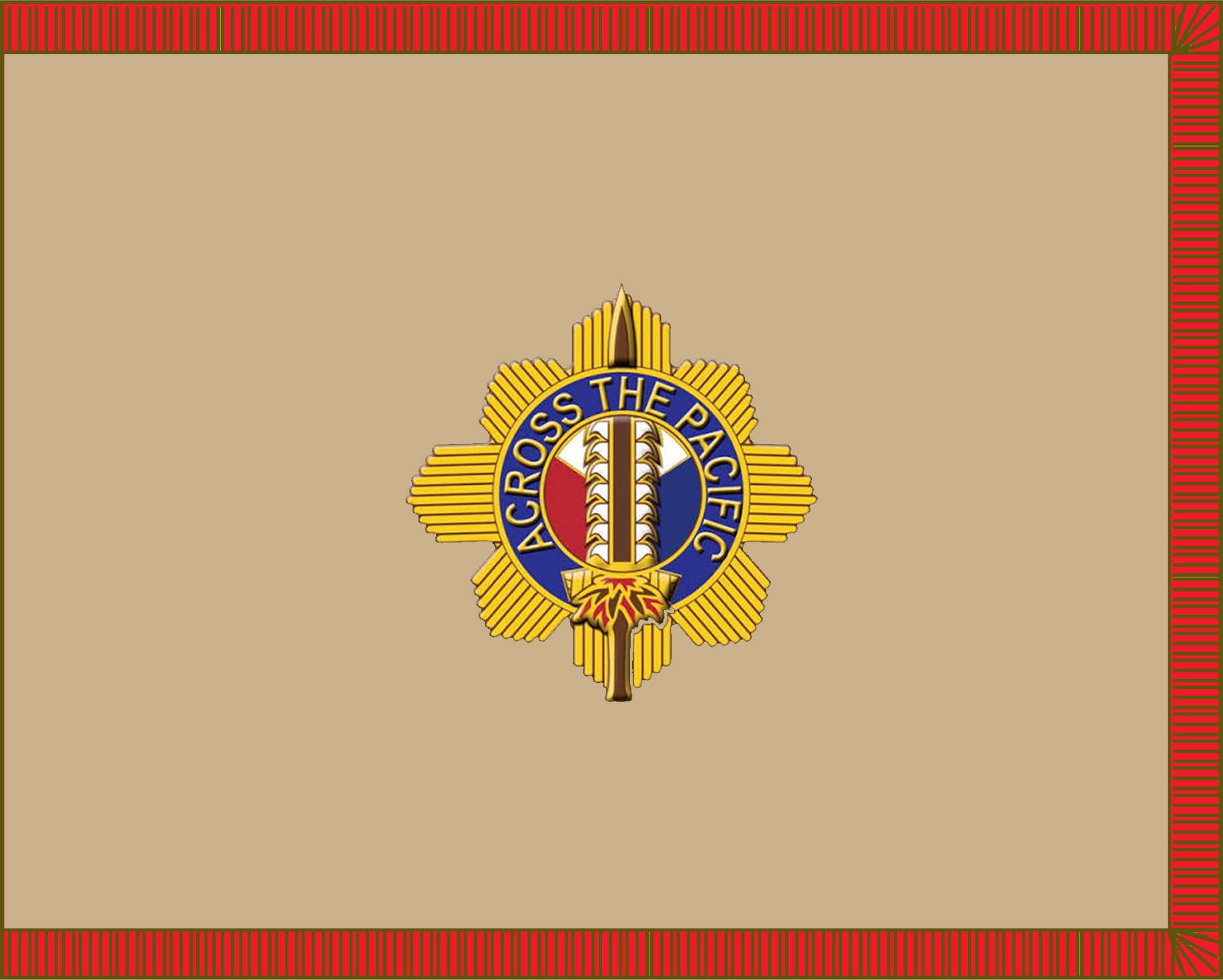
- 413th Contracting Support Brigade Flag

The 413th Contracting Support Brigade (CSB) is a unit of the US Army stationed at Fort Shafter, Hawaii. The unit has a long lineage going back to 1898 in Hawaii when the army needed contracting in the newly annexed territory. The unit's roots start in US Army Western Command (WESTCOM) as a part of the US Pacific Command as early as 1979. The unit became a part of US Army Alaska in 1989 and US Army Japan in 1990. The unit would go through many other reorganizations until in 2009 it was established as the 413th Contracting Support Brigade under the Army Contracting Command (ACC) to provide contracting support to the Indo-Pacific region.

The unit received the Army Superior Unit Award in 2023 for its support of Operation Warp Speed.

== Subordinate Units ==
- Regional Contracting Office - Alaska (RCO-AK)
- Regional Contracting Office - Hawaii (RCO-HI)
