= 21st Theater Sustainment Command =

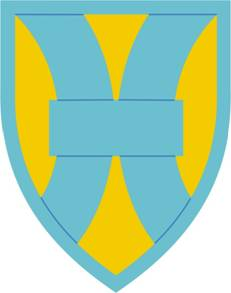
- 21st Theater Sustainment Command Shoulder Sleeve Insignia
- Active: 1965–present
- Country: United States
- Branch: United States Army
- Part of: US Army Europe
- Garrison/HQ: Kaiserslautern, Germany
- Nickname: 21st TSC
- Motto: First In Support
- Engagements: Operation Iraqi Freedom; Operation Enduring Freedom

Commanders
- Current commander: MG Michael B. Lalor

Insignia
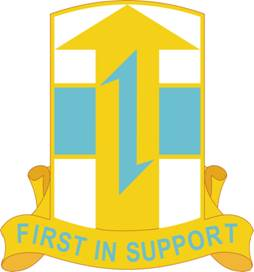
- 21st Sustainment Command DUI

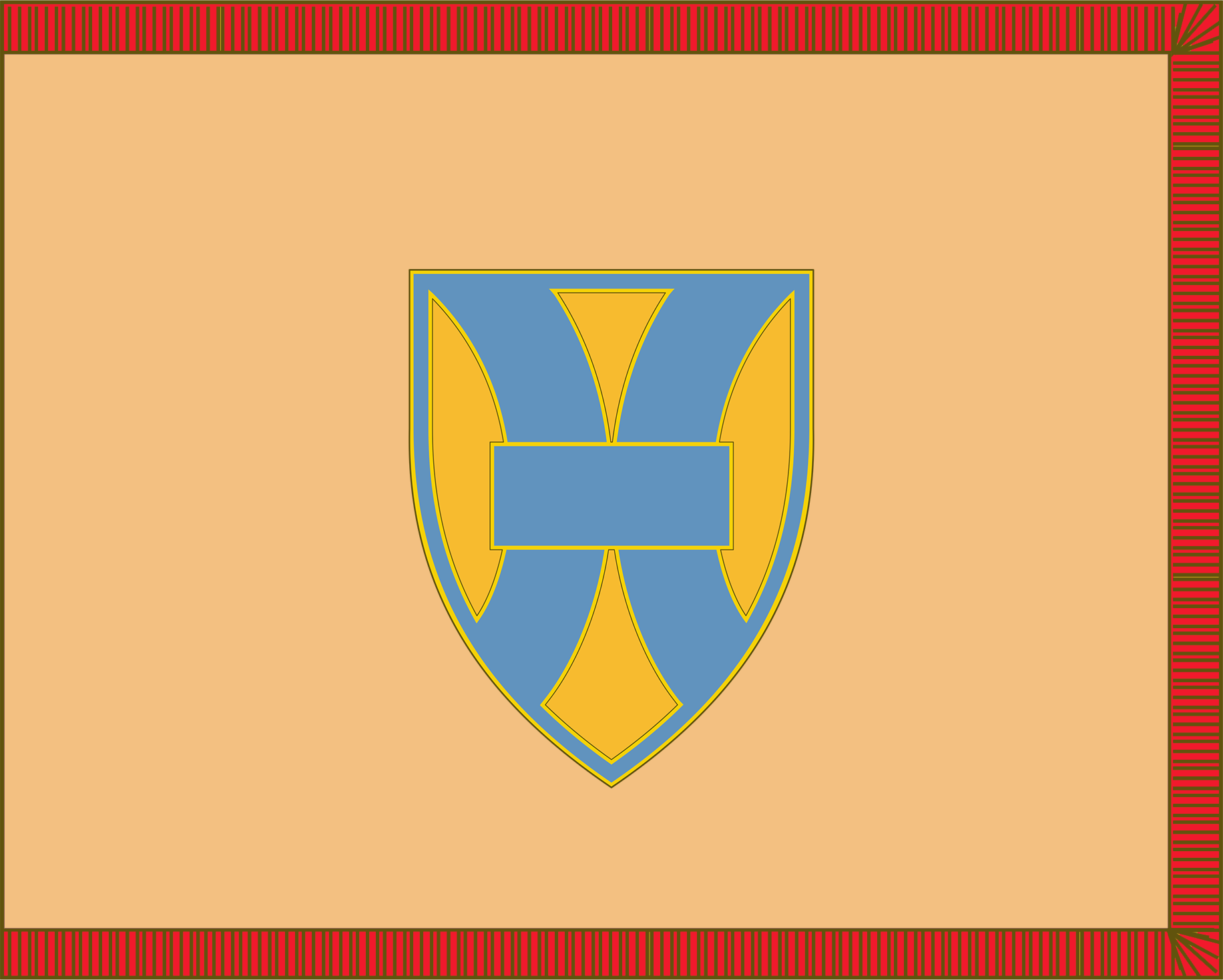
- 21st Sustainment Command Flag

The 21st Theater Sustainment Command (21 TSC) provides theater sustainment throughout EUCOM and AFRICOM Areas of Responsibility in support of USAREUR and 7th Army. On order, it deploys to support theater opening, distribution, and Reception, Staging, Onward Movement & enable Integration (RSO&I) functions. It is prepared to support Joint and Coalition forces.

== History ==
The heritage of 21st Theater Sustainment Command began on 23 June 1965 with the activation of the 1st Support Brigade. The 21st TSC originated as a maintenance support headquarters under Seventh Army Support Command, the brigade's first home was Taylor Barracks, Mannheim, Germany.

After the United States military withdrawal from France in 1967 and the organization of the U.S. Theater Army Support Command, Europe, informally known as TASCOM, the brigade became the rear-area counterpart of the newly formed corps support commands. Assigned to TASCOM in 1969, 1st Support Brigade was responsible for Prepositioning of Materiel Configured to Unit Sets (POMCUS) and provided combat service support for U.S. units in the area west of the Rhein River.

In 1974, TASCOM was merged with Headquarters, United States Army Europe, and the missions of 1st Support Brigade were expanded to include base operations support for eight military communities as well as the management of regional area support. The brigade was upgraded to a general officer command and the headquarters moved to Kleber Kaserne, Kaiserslautern, Germany.

By mid-1976 the 1st Support Brigade's personnel strength was approximately 16,000 – the largest brigade in the U.S. Army. Consequently, the Department of the Army approved the elevation of the commander's position to major general and on 19 August 1976 the brigade was re-designated 21st Support Command. The command came to include the 47th Area Support Group with a major depot located at RAF Burtonwood, Cheshire, in the United Kingdom, stockpiling POMCUS equipment. Other units included Combat Equipment Group Europe, 29th Area Support Group, and 60th Ordnance Group.

During the next several years, important missions and units were assigned to the 21st and, in June 1981, the President of the United States elevated the commander's position to lieutenant general, reflecting the organization's status as a Theater Army Area Command. Accordingly, on 18 October 1988, 21st Support Command was officially re-designated the 21st Theater Army Area Command.

After the dissolution of the Soviet Union, U.S. forces in Europe began a reduction in personnel to accompany the reduced threat. Authorizations for both military and civilian positions were decreased substantially and, in 1993, the grade of the 21st TAACOM commander was returned to major general.

On 18 October 2000 the 21st TAACOM structure was replaced by the Army and U.S. Army Europe and transformed into the 21st Theater Sustainment Command (TSC). In 2006, the 21st TSC HQ further changed by absorbing some functions of some of its former units, such as the 200th MMC (Material Management, formerly the US Army Material Command, Europe,(MATCOM) located in Zweibruecken, and 1st TMCA (Transportation Movement Control) because these units deactivated. This change made the 21st the Army's largest forward deployed military formation. The command stayed a major forward presence in theater logistics in support of Central Region, Europe.

Throughout this evolution the 21st has retained the lineage and honors, distinguishing flag (colors), and distinctive unit badge and shoulder sleeve insignia of the "FIRST IN SUPPORT!"

== Organization 2025 ==
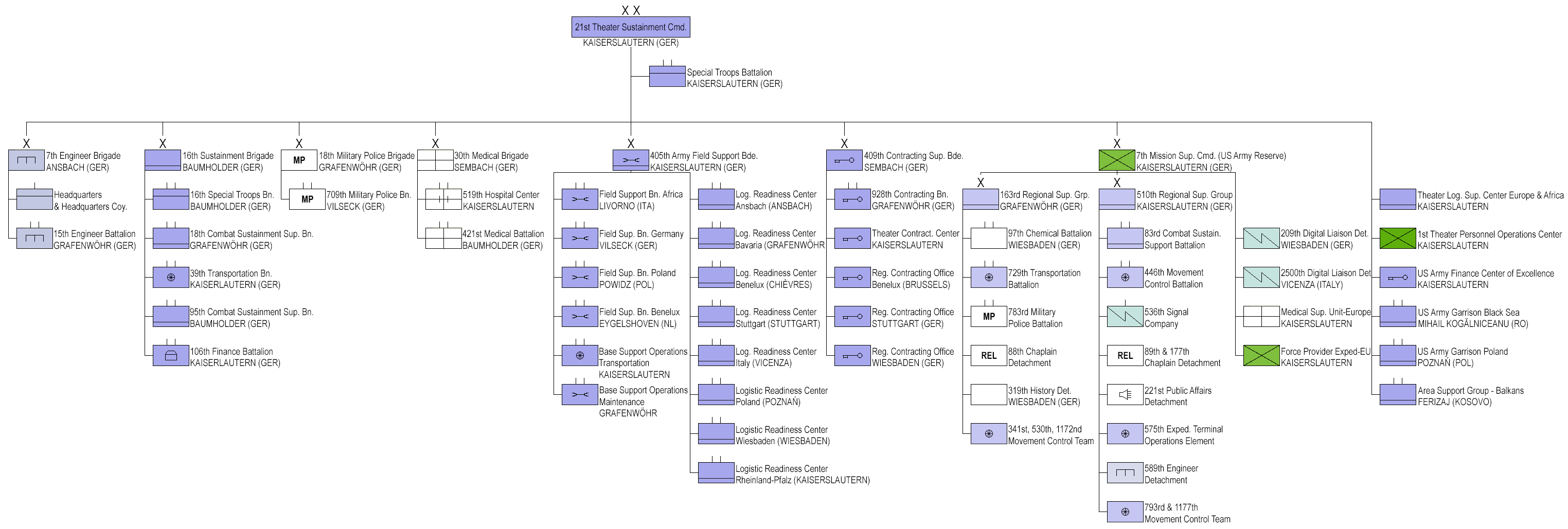
21st Theater Sustainment Command organization December 2025

As of December 2025 21st Theater Sustainment Command consists of the following units:

- 21st Theater Sustainment Command, in Kaiserslautern
  - Special Troops Battalion, 21st Theater Sustainment Command, in Kaiserslautern
  - 7th Mission Support Command, in Kaiserslautern (US Army Reserve)
  - 7th Engineer Brigade, in Ansbach
  - 16th Sustainment Brigade, in Baumholder
  - 18th Military Police Brigade, in Grafenwöhr
  - 30th Medical Brigade, in Sembach
  - 405th Army Field Support Brigade, in Kaiserslautern
  - 409th Contracting Support Brigade, in Kaiserslautern
  - US Army Garrison Black Sea, at Mihail Kogălniceanu Air Base, (Romania)
  - US Army Garrison Poland, in Poznań (Poland)
  - Area Support Group - Balkans, at Camp Bondsteel, (Kosovo)
  - 1st Theater Personnel Operations Center, in Kaiserslautern
  - US Army Finance Center of Excellence (USAFCE), in Kaiserslautern
    - Germany Finance Center of Excellence (GFCE)
    - BENELUX Finance Center of Excellence (BFCE)
    - Italy Finance Center of Excellence (IFCE)
  - Theater Logistics Support Center Europe and Africa, in Kaiserslautern
    - Maintenance Activity Kaiserslautern, in Kaiserslautern
    - Maintenance Activity Vilseck, in Vilseck
    - 6966th Transportation Truck Terminal, in Kaiserslautern
    - Supply Activity Europe, in Kaiserslautern
    - Ammunition Center Europe, in Miesau

== Former notable members ==
- Steven A. Shapiro, previous commanding general
- Joe Weingarten, honorary colonel
- Diane L. Potts, previous Deputy, G3, responsible for conversion to TSC.
