= 16th Special Troops Battalion =

United States Military unit

- Active: 16 July 2007 – Present
- Country: United States
- Allegiance: United States Army
- Branch: Active duty
- Role: Sustainment
- Size: Battalion
- Part of: 16th Sustainment Brigade
- Garrison/HQ: Baumholder, Germany
- Motto(s): On Point!
- Decorations: Presidential Unit Citation

Commanders
- Commander: LTC Hans Lokodi
- Command Sergeant Major: CSM Burke Bates

The 16th Special Troops Battalion is a subordinate battalion of the 16th Sustainment Brigade, and is based in Baumholder, Germany. On 16 July 2007, the 16th Special Troops Battalion was activated in Warner Barracks, U.S. Army Garrison, Bamberg, Germany.

In July 2008, the battalion deployed to Iraq, where it provided sustainment, combat support, and force protection operations in support of Multi-National Division-North through expert life support and logistical operations.
