= 16th Sustainment Brigade =

Sustainment brigade of the United States Army

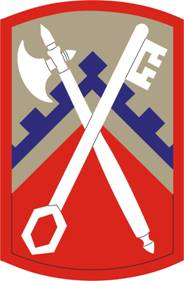
- 16th Sustainment Brigade shoulder sleeve insignia
- Active: 16 July 2007 – present
- Country: United States
- Branch: United States Army
- Type: Sustainment Brigade
- Role: Sustainment
- Size: Brigade
- Part of: 21st Sustainment Command
- Garrison/HQ: Baumholder, Germany
- Motto: "Deeds Not Words!"

Commanders
- Current commander: COL Christopher Richardson; CSM Jimmy Ingram

Insignia
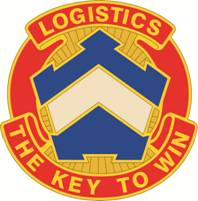
- 16th Sustainment Brigade DUI

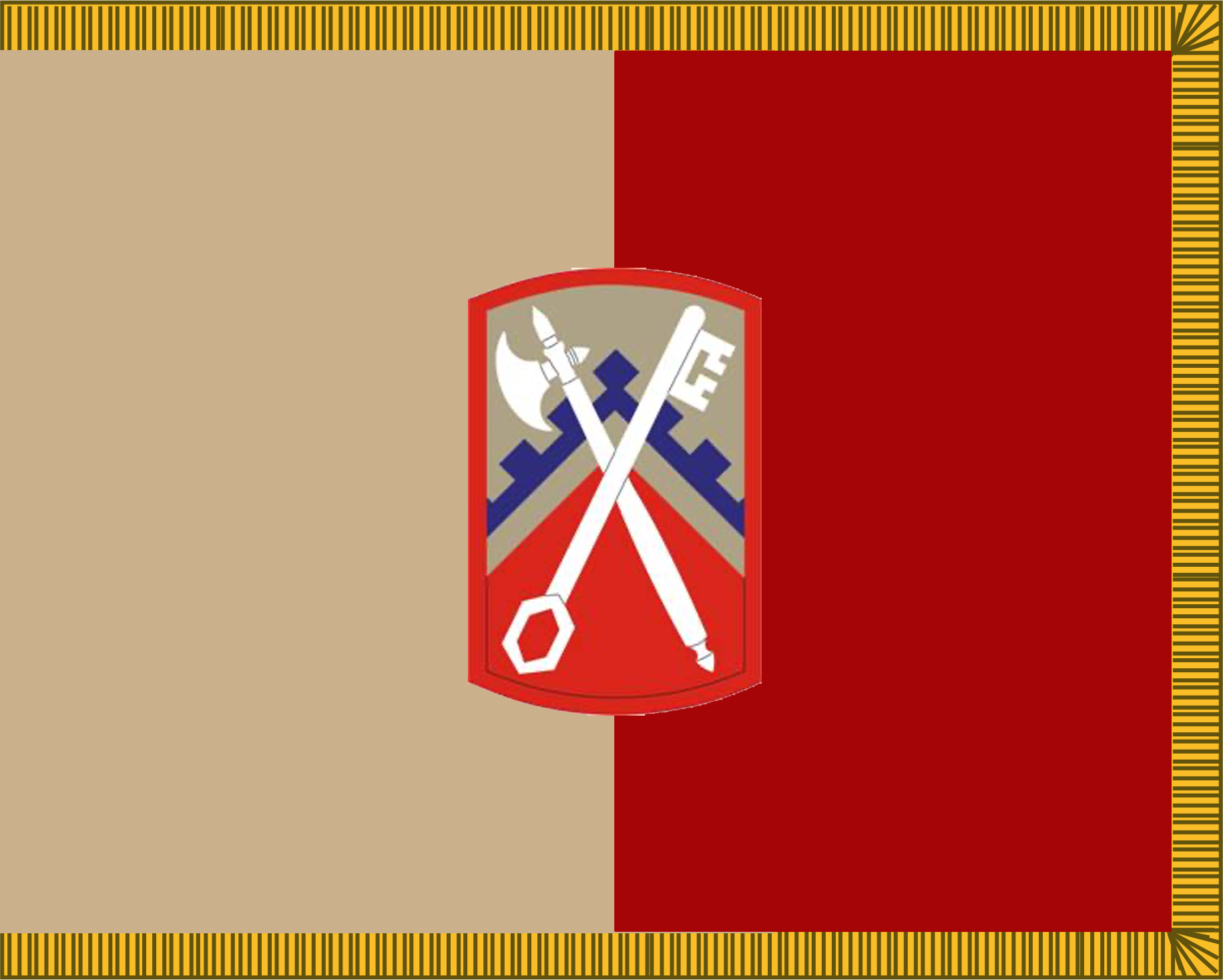
- 16th Sustainment Brigade Flag

The 16th Sustainment Brigade is a sustainment brigade of the United States Army based at Smith Barracks in Baumholder, Germany. It is a subordinate unit of the 21st Theater Sustainment Command of the Seventh Army.

Activated in the summer of 2007, the brigade traces its lineage to the 7th and 16th Corps Support Groups which combined to form it. As the only sustainment brigade active in US Army Europe, the brigade provides sustainment for all of the forces of US Army's commands for Europe and Africa. It saw two deployments to Iraq in support of Operation Iraqi Freedom as the 16th Corps Support Group. It deployed to Iraq for its first tour as a Sustainment brigade from July 2008 to October 2009.

== Organization ==
The headquarters of the 16th Sustainment Brigade is located in Baumholder and the brigade is subordinate to 21st Theater Sustainment Command, which in turn is subordinate to the United States Army Europe and Africa.

As of January 2026 brigade consists of the following units:

- 16th Sustainment Brigade, in Baumholder (Germany)
  - 16th Special Troops Battalion, in Baumholder (Germany)
    - Headquarters and Headquarters Company, 16th Special Troops Battalion, in Baumholder (Germany)
    - 5th Quartermaster Company (Theater Aerial Delivery) (Airborne), in Kaiserslautern (Germany)
    - 504th Signal Company, in Baumholder (Germany)
    - 569th Human Resources Company, in Baumholder (Germany)
  - 18th Combat Sustainment Support Battalion, in Grafenwöhr (Germany)
    - Headquarters and Headquarters Company, 18th Combat Sustainment Support Battalion, in Grafenwöhr (Germany)
    - 23rd Ordnance Company (Ammo) (Modular), in Grafenwöhr (Germany)
    - 51st Transportation Medium Truck Company (PLS) (EAB Tactical), in Grafenwöhr (Germany)
    - 63rd Transportation Medium Truck Company (POL, 5K GAL), in Grafenwöhr (Germany)
    - 166th Maintenance Team, in Grafenwöhr (Germany)
    - 221st Quartermaster Company (Field Feeding), in Ansbach (Germany)
    - 493rd Quartermaster Company (Petroleum Support), in Grafenwöhr (Germany)
    - 515th Transportation Medium Truck Company (POL, 5K GAL), in Baumholder (Germany)
  - 39th Transportation Battalion (Movement Control), in Kaiserslautern (Germany)
    - Headquarters and Headquarters Company, 39th Transportation Battalion (Movement Control), in Kaiserslautern (Germany)
    - 1st Transportation Company (Inland Cargo Transfer Company), in Kaiserslautern (Germany)
    - 66th Transportation Medium Truck Company (PLS) (EAB Tactical), in Kaiserslautern (Germany)
    - 260th Transportation Detachment (Movement Control Team), in Grafenwöhr (Germany)
    - 355th Transportation Detachment (Movement Control Team), in Grafenwöhr (Germany)
    - 386th Transportation Detachment (Movement Control Team), at Caserma Ederle (Italy)
    - 624th Transportation Detachment (Movement Control Team), in Kaiserslautern (Germany)
    - 627th Transportation Detachment (Movement Control Team), in Kaiserslautern (Germany)
    - 635th Transportation Detachment (Movement Control Team), in Kaiserslautern (Germany)
  - 95th Combat Sustainment Support Battalion, in Baumholder (Germany)
    - Headquarters and Headquarters Company, 95th Combat Sustainment Support Battalion, in Baumholder (Germany)
    - 40th Transportation Medium Truck Company (Cargo) (EAB Linehaul), in Baumholder (Germany)
    - 42nd Transportation Medium Truck Company (Cargo) (EAB Linehaul), in Kaiserslautern (Germany)
    - 55th Quartermaster Company (Field Feeding), in Baumholder (Germany)
    - 240th Quartermaster Company (Supply), in Baumholder (Germany)
    - 317th Ordnance Company (Support Maintenance), in Baumholder (Germany)
  - 106th Finance Battalion, in Kaiserslautern (Germany)
    - Headquarters and Headquarters Company, 106th Finance Battalion, in Kaiserslautern (Germany)
    - Alpha Company, 106th Finance Battalion, in Grafenwöhr (Germany)
    - Bravo Company, 106th Finance Battalion, at Caserma Ederle (Italy)

== History ==
=== Origin ===
The unit was first constituted on 29 October 1965 in the Regular Army as the 16th General Support Group. It was then activated on 10 December 1965 in the Dominican Republic. The group returned to the continental United States and was subsequently inactivated on 19 September 1968 at Fort Benning, Georgia.

The group was redesignated on 16 September 1987 as the 16th Support Group and activated in Germany. Through the 1990s, the 16th CSG also participated in operations in Kuwait, Saudi Arabia and Kosovo. It received its distinctive unit insignia on 14 April 1988.

On 1 May 2002, the group was re-aligned to include the 181st Transportation Battalion located at Turley Barracks in Manheim, Germany, and the 485th Corps Support Battalion, located on Hutier Kaserne, to increase their combat service support capabilities.

In March 2003, the 16th Corps Support Group and its battalions deployed to Iraq in support of Operation Iraqi Freedom. The group provided logistical support to include direct support maintenance, transportation and supply support to all units in the operation. During this deployment the unit and controlled 3,000 logistical soldiers provided a support role for Combined Joint Task Force 7 (CJTF-7) for combat and stability operations, including the invasion, for Operation Iraqi Freedom. During this deployment they primarily operated out of Camp Dogwood.

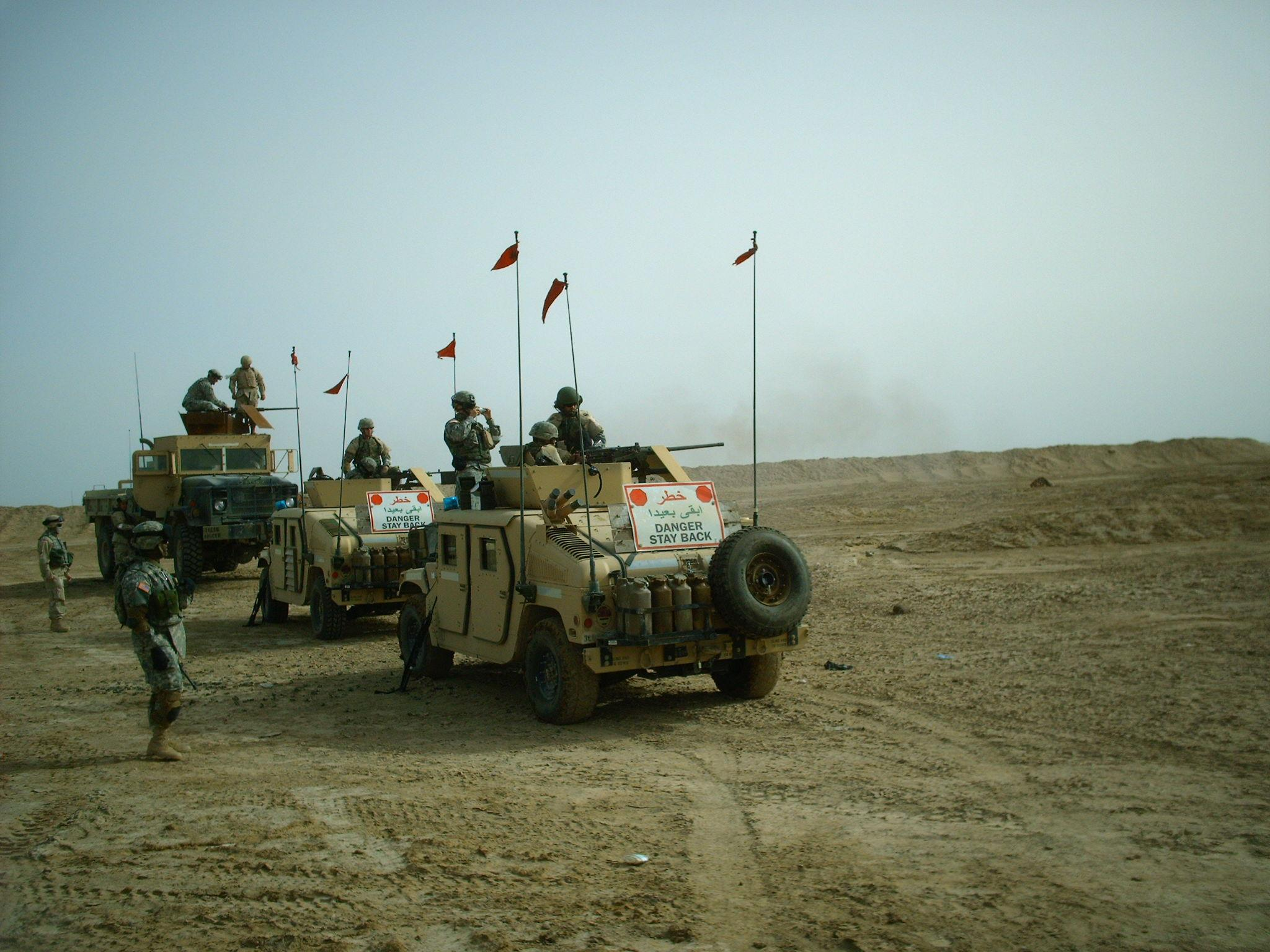
HHC 16th Corps Support Group conducts Heavy Weapons Range in support of Convoy Logistic Patrols in Samawah Iraq 2006

The group saw a second deployment to Iraq in October 2005 while primarily operating out of Tallil Air Base and Camp Adder near An Nasiriyah Iraq. The 16th CSG also had support personnel located in Kuwait, Mosul, Baghdad and LSA Anaconda, LSA Taji, and other major bases around Iraq. 16th CSG Also provided support to Cedar II, Scania, Camp Charlie, Camp Delta, Camp Echo, Camp Duke and others with an area expanding from the Kuwait Border to LSA Anaconda During this deployment, soldiers of the group executed over 1,500 sustainment convoys which provided over 250 million US gallons (950,000 m^{3}) of fuel, 1 million cases of bottled water and 60 million US gallons (230,000 m^{3}) of purified water to allied forces. The 16th CSG also operated both the Air and Land Movement Control Centers with over rotary and fixed wing support for the 27th Movement Control Battalion and the 101st Airborne Division supply emergency support for camps and bases throughout Southern Iraq. During this deployment the 16th CSG also operated a Military Transition Team in the Southern Baghdad Area. During this operation they also controlled and supported logistic operations for such units for the 48th Infantry Brigade Combat Team, 36th Infantry Division, and the 34th Infantry Division. One of the other missions of the 16th CSG was their "S5 Section" which was Civil Affairs On 19 September 2006, the group rotated out of Iraq and back to Germany, replaced by the 82nd Sustainment Brigade.

Upon rotation back to Hanau Germany the 16th Corp Support Group began deactivating and assisting in the deactivation of units throughout Europe. Soldiers left with the unit were attached to Task Force Sustainer which was a joint operation with the 21st Theater Support Command in the shutting down of Kaserne's and Units, and the retrograding of vehicles and equipment.

=== Activation ===
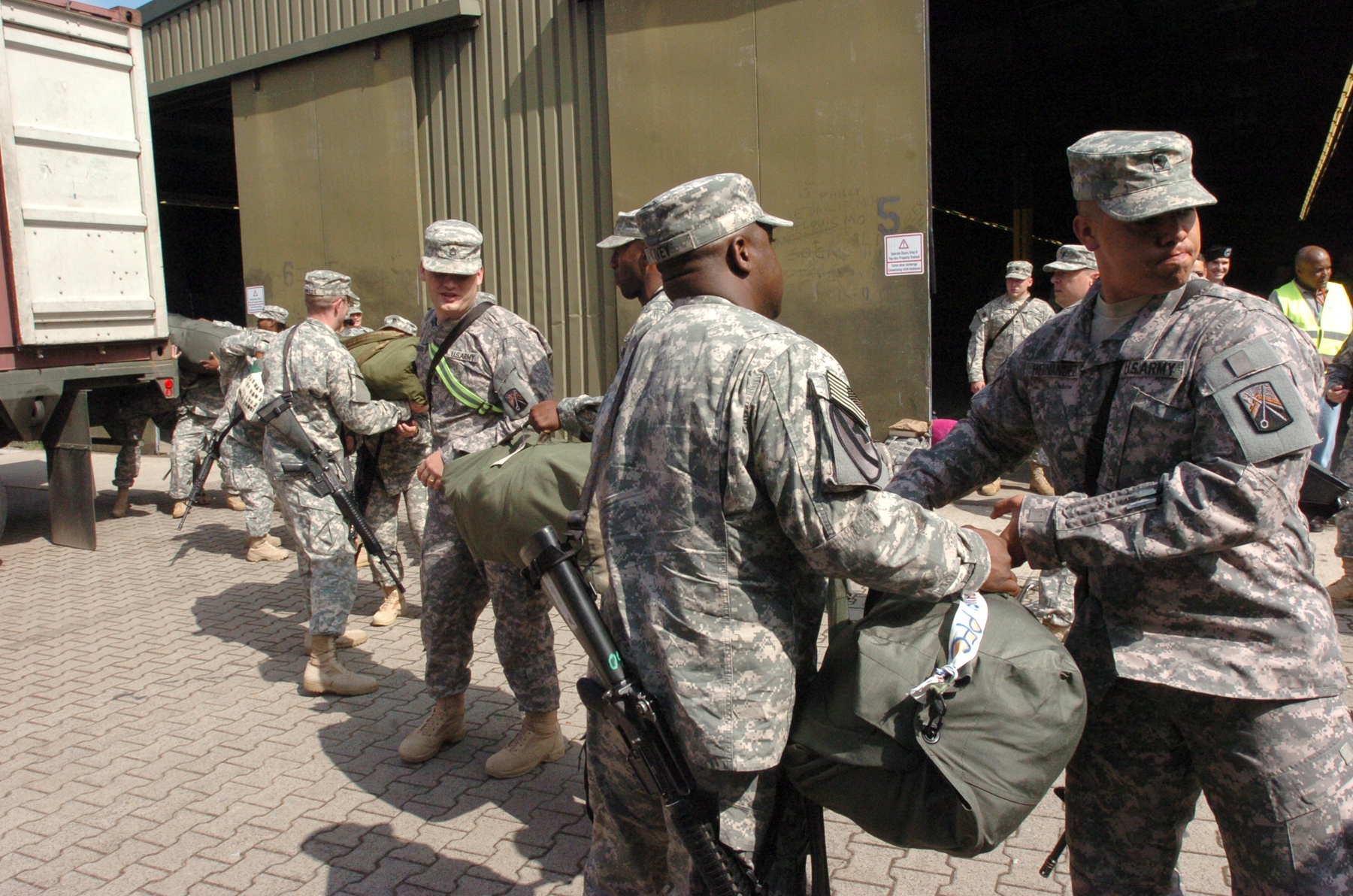
The brigade loads gear for a deployment to Iraq.

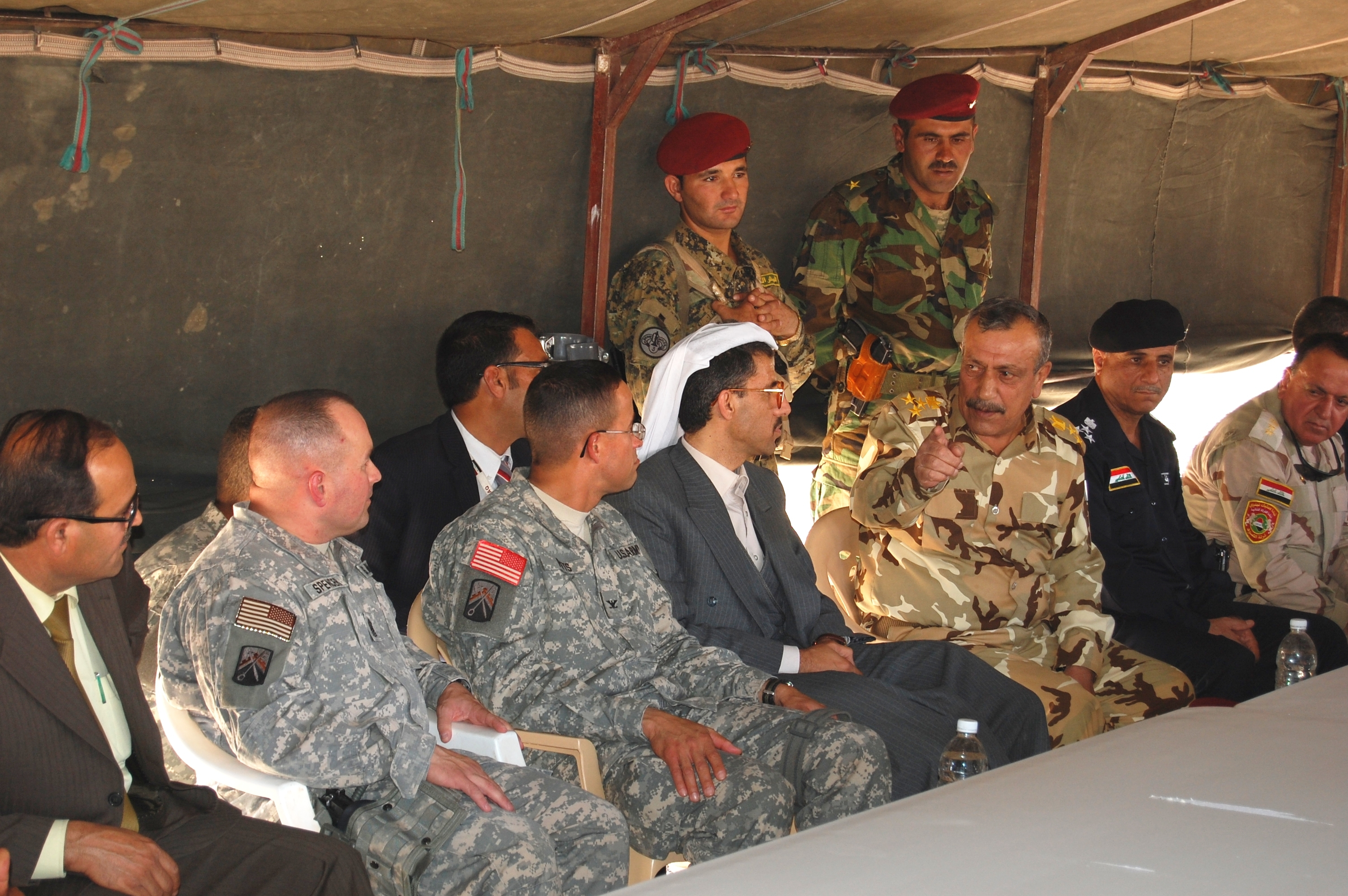
Brigade leaders meet with Iraqi officials at COB Q-West.

In January 2007, the lineage and honors were designated to be transferred to the 16th Sustainment Brigade. On 16 July 2007 the group was reorganized as part of an effort to reform support groups into larger, more versatile sustainment brigades. It became the 16th Sustainment Brigade and was subsequently activated at Warner Barracks in Bamberg, Germany. The 16th Corps Support Group and the 7th Corps Support Group had been deactivated and combined to form the new formation. Their subordinate units had been moved and redesignated as well. This move made the 16th Sustainment Brigade the only brigade-sized logistics unit supporting United States Army Europe. It was put under the command of the 21st Theater Sustainment Command. The move was part of an overall streamlining of the Command's logistics element, as all major logistics formations were redesigned to be modular and more efficient. The sustainment brigade not only retained all previous logistics functions and responsibilities, but also assumed additional services, like finance, medical and signal capabilities. The brigade was composed of the 16th Special Troops Battalion headquartered at Bamberg, the 391st Combat Sustainment Support Battalion at Bamberg, and the 18th Combat Sustainment Support Battalion in Grafenwoehr. It also received its shoulder sleeve insignia.

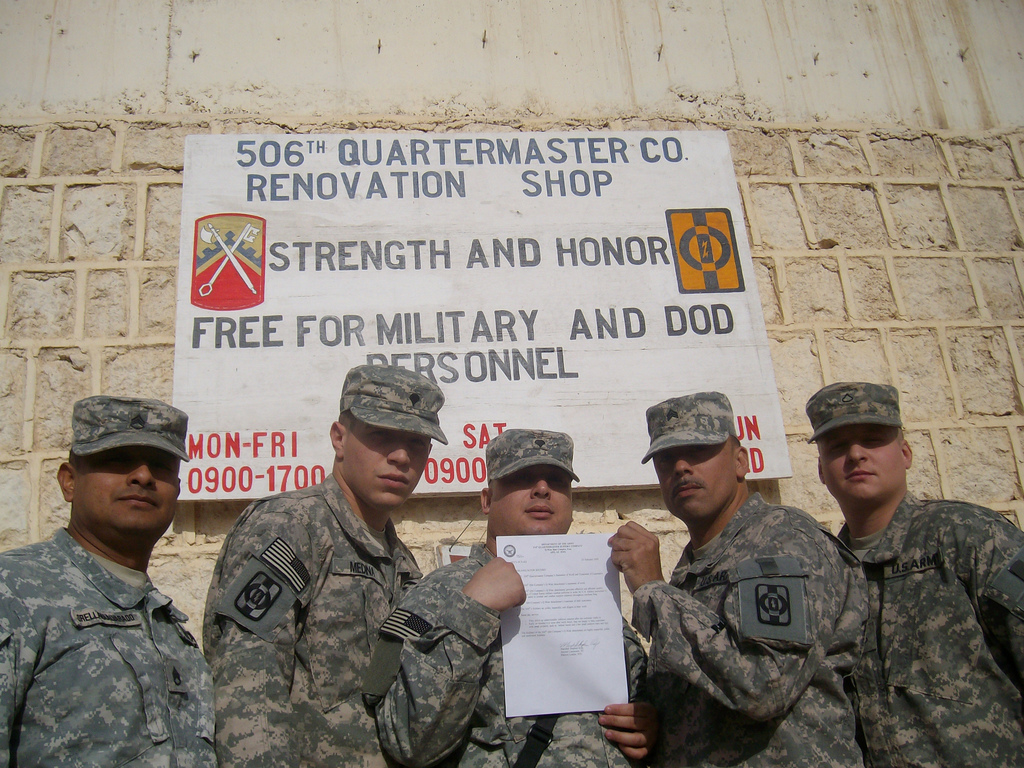
16th Sustainment Brigade soldiers in Iraq.

On 29 November 2007, it was announced that the 16th Sustainment Brigade would be deployed to Iraq in summer of 2008. It would be part of a force of 8,000 soldiers from US Army Europe to deploy. The brigade was just one of over 20 major units from Europe to deploy to the Middle East in 2008; most of these units came from the 21st Theater Sustainment Command and V Corps. Throughout the Spring of 2008, the unit prepared for the deployment by conducting training exercises in Germany.

In July 2008, the brigade deployed to Iraq for its first tour in Operation Iraqi Freedom as a sustainment brigade. Its mission in the country was to provide sustainment and force protection operations in support of Multi-National Division North with life support and logistical operations. On 22 July 2008, the brigade's soldiers underwent final preparations before departing Ramstein Air Base for northern Iraq. The brigade operated out of Contingency Operating Base Q-West, which was supported by a dozen Iraqi small businesses.

In October 2008, the brigade's leaders attended a conference at Joint Base Balad. Hosted by the 3rd Sustainment Command (Expeditionary), the conference was attended by the 1st, 7th, 16th, 55th, and 371st Sustainment Brigades, as well as the 76th Infantry Brigade Combat Team. They discussed streamlining and coordinating sustainment throughout the region. Among the brigade's operations was a water project in the Ninewa province. The brigade operated with US Air Force and Iraqi Army engineers to repair infrastructure that brought water from the Tigris River to the entire province, including the base. The brigade has also undertaken several other support duties for units operating throughout northern Iraq.

The brigade participated in joint exercises with the 18th Military Police Brigade and other elements of the 21st Theater Support Command in Spring of 2009. The exercises involved extensive battle simulations and role play missions to test the overall effectiveness of the units.

In October 2010, the brigade served as the command and control element for Saber Strike 11, a cooperative training effort aimed at improving interoperability and preparing Latvian, Estonian, Lithuanian and U.S. troops for upcoming deployments in support of the International Security Assistance Forces in Afghanistan.

In July 2016, 23rd Ordnance Company, 18th Combat Sustainment Support Command assumed mission command of the logistics for Task Force Warhammer, in Mihail Kogălniceanu Air Base, Romania.

== Honors ==
=== Unit Decorations ===
Ribbon	Award	Year	Notes
	Meritorious Unit Commendation (Army)	2003–2004	for service in Operation Iraqi Freedom
	Meritorious Unit Commendation (Army)	2005–2006	for service in Operation Iraqi Freedom
	Superior Unit Award	1995–1996	for service during Operation Joint Endeavor
	Superior Unit Award	2016-2017	for Anaconda exercise

=== Campaign streamers ===
Conflict	Streamer	Year(s)
Gulf War	Defense of Saudi Arabia	1990–1991
Gulf War	Liberation and Defense of Kuwait	1990–1991
Gulf War	Cease-Fire	1990–1991
Iraq War	Operation Iraqi Freedom I	2003–2004
Iraq War	Operation Iraqi Freedom III	2005–2006
Iraq War	Operation Iraqi Freedom IV	2008–2009
