= Mark S. Bennett =

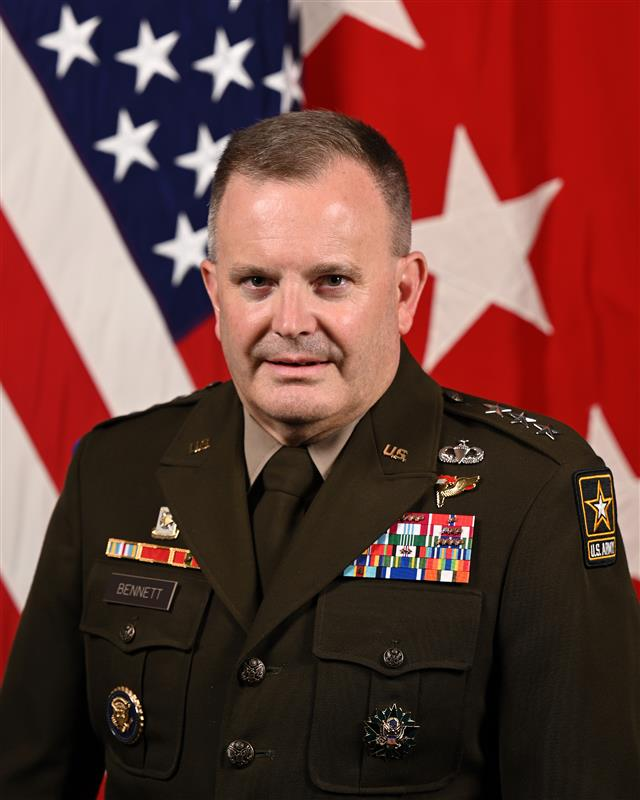
- Education: John Carroll University (BSBA); Syracuse University (MBA); National Defense University (MS)
- Military career
- Branch: United States Army
- Service years: 1990 to present
- Rank: Lieutenant general
- Awards: Legion of Merit (5); Bronze Star (2)

Lieutenant General Mark S. Bennett is a decorated three-star U.S. Army general. On August 25, 2025, he became a Deputy Assistant Secretary of the Army, as the Military Deputy for Budget, Office of the Assistant Secretary of the Army. His prior posting, he was the thirty-second Director of Army Budget as Assistant Secretary of the Army (Financial Management and Comptroller) ASA (FM&C).

== Early life and education ==
A native of Ohio, Bennett holds a Bachelor of Science in Business Administration degree in accounting from John Carroll University and a Master of Business Administration degree from Syracuse University. He additionally holds a Master of Science degree in National Security and Resource Strategy from the National Defense University. His military training includes the Field Artillery Officer Basic Course, Finance Officer Advanced Course, the United States Army Command and General Staff College, and the Dwight D. Eisenhower School for National Security and Resource Strategy.

== Military career ==
Bennett was commissioned in 1990 into the Field Artillery as a Distinguished Military Graduate. He began his operational assignments with the 6th Battalion, 37th Field Artillery Regiment in Korea and also served as the Task Force Finance Officer for 4th Battalion, 325th Airborne Infantry Regiment, for a Multinational Force and Observers rotation to Sinai, Egypt. He had two company command experiences with the 82nd Finance Battalion at Fort Bragg, North Carolina, and the 177th Finance Battalion in Korea. Following completion of graduate school at Syracuse University, he served as the Executive Officer to the Deputy Chief of Staff for Resource Management, United States Army Training and Doctrine Command at Ft. Monroe, Virginia. Shortly after arriving for duty at the Pentagon, he supported the Army and Nation's response to the 9-11 attacks before attending Command and General Staff College.

He returned to the 82nd Airborne Division as the Division Finance Support Operations Officer at Fort Bragg and deployed in support of Operation Iraqi Freedom. He then served as the Executive Officer to the Director of Army Budget, as a Program Examiner at the Office of Management and Budget, and as a Congressional Budget Liaison for the Office of the Assistant Secretary of the Army for Financial Management & Comptroller ASA(FM&C).

Bennett commanded the Headquarters and Headquarters Battalion, 10th Mountain Division (Light Infantry), Fort Drum, New York for 31 months including a deployment to Kandahar, Afghanistan. He returned to HQDA as the Executive Officer to the Military Deputy for Budget, ASA(FM&C) and Chief of the Planning, Programming, Budgeting, and Execution System Integration for the ASA(FM&C). Bennett also served as the Assistant Chief of Staff, G8, at Headquarters, I Corps, Joint Base Lewis–McChord, Washington before deploying again to Afghanistan. He served as the deputy director of Resource Management with the Combined Security Transition Command – Afghanistan (CSTC-A) in support of the Resolute Support Mission. Bennett then served as the Chief of Army Congressional Budget Liaison (SAFM-BUL), in the ASA(FM&C). He served as the Director of Resource Management (G8) for the Headquarters, Installation Management Command (IMCOM) before most recently serving as the Commanding General of the U.S. Army Financial Management Command.

On August 3, 2025, Bennett was promoted to lieutenant general and on August 25, 2025, he became the Military Deputy for Budget, Office of the Assistant Secretary of the Army (Financial Management and Comptroller), in Washington, DC.

== Awards ==
Bennett's awards and decorations include the Legion of Merit with 4 oak leaf clusters (OLC), the Bronze Star Medal with 1 OLC, the Joint Meritorious Service Medal, the Meritorious Service Medal (1 SLC + 2 OLC), the Senior Parachutist Badge, the Pathfinder Badge, the Presidential Service Badge and the Army Staff Identification Badge.
