= 7th Mission Support Command =

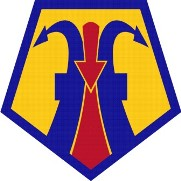
- Shoulder Sleeve Insignia
- Active: 1 July 1956 - present
- Country: United States
- Branch: United States Army Reserve
- Role: Mission Support
- Size: Command
- Part of: 21st Theater Sustainment Command
- Garrison/HQ: Kaiserslautern, Germany
- Mottos: All Ready, Already Here
- Decorations: Superior Unit Award

Commanders
- Commanding General: Brigadier General Karen S. Monday-Gresham
- Command Sergeant Major: Shahpour Eskandary
- Command Chief Warrant Officer: Chief Warrant Officer 5 Angela J. Williams

Insignia
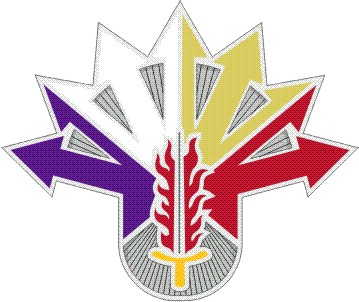
- 7th Mission Support Command DUI

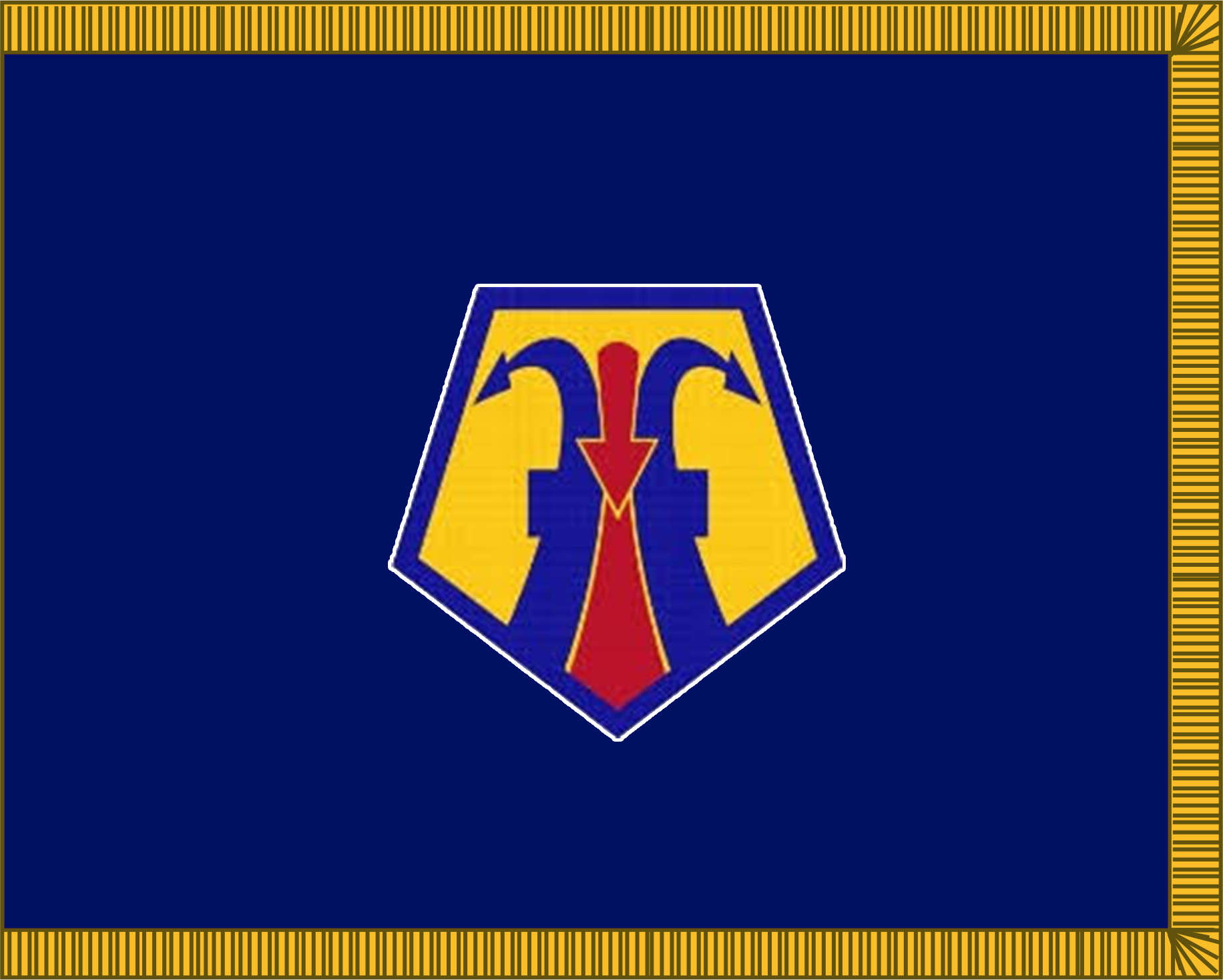
- 7th Mission Support Command Flag

The 7th Mission Support Command (7 MSC) has operational control of the US Army Reserve units in Europe.

The command traces its history to 1956 when the first Army Reserve units (four Army Reserve Schools) were established in Europe at Heidelberg, Frankfurt, and Paris. The 7th ARCOM was activated provisionally in January 1986 and was headquartered at Tompkins Barracks, Schwetzingen, Germany.

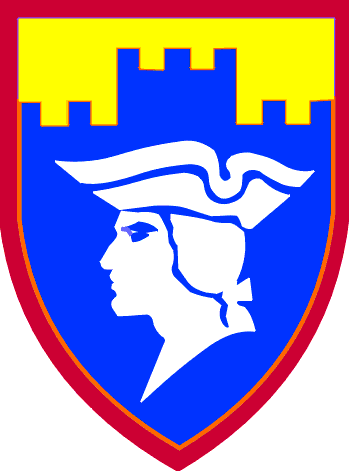
7th Army Reserve Command SSI

The 7th ARCOM enabled soldiers separating overseas, Americans living and working in Europe, and Reservists transferring there, to continue their military careers in the Army Reserve. Consistent with the Chief of Army Reserve's (CAR) vision, the Army Reserve was the essential support provider for the Army engaged in worldwide operations.

Five 7th ARCOM units mobilized and deployed with their affiliated active-Army units in Southwest Asia for Operations Desert Shield/Storm.

The 7th Civil Support Command was officially activated to replace the 7th ARCOM in December 2009.

The 7th Mission Support Command replaced the 7th CSC on 1 October 2015.

== Organization ==
The 7th Mission Support Command is a subordinate geographic command of the United States Army Reserve Command responsible for reserve units in Europe. As of January 2026 the command consists of the following Army Reserve units:

- 7th Mission Support Command, in Kaiserslautern (Germany)
  - Headquarters and Headquarters Company, 7th Mission Support Command, in Kaiserslautern
  - 7th Intermediate Level Education Detachment (ILE), in Grafenwöhr
  - 209th Digital Liaison Detachment (DLD), in Wackernheim
  - 2500th Digital Liaison Detachment (DLD), in Longare (Italy)
  - Medical Support Unit – US Army Europe and Africa, in Kaiserslautern
  - 457th Civil Affairs Battalion, in Longare (Italy)
    - Alpha Company, 457th Civil Affairs Battalion, in Longare (Italy)
    - Bravo Company, 457th Civil Affairs Battalion, in Grafenwöhr
    - Charlie Company, 457th Civil Affairs Battalion, in Wackernheim
    - Delta Company, 457th Civil Affairs Battalion, in Grafenwöhr
  - 163rd Regional Support Group, in Grafenwöhr
    - Headquarters and Headquarters Company, 163rd Regional Support Group, in Grafenwöhr
    - 97th Chemical Battalion, in Wiesbaden
      - Headquarters and Headquarters Company, 97th Chemical Battalion, in Wiesbaden
    - 729th Transportation Battalion (Terminal), in Grafenwöhr
      - Headquarters and Headquarters Detachment, 729th Transportation Battalion (Terminal), in Grafenwöhr
    - 783rd Military Police Battalion, in Grafenwöhr
      - Headquarters and Headquarters Company, 783rd Military Police Battalion, in Grafenwöhr
    - 88th Chaplain Detachment, in Grafenwöhr
    - 89th Chaplain Detachment, in Kaiserslautern
    - 319th Military History Detachment, in Wiesbaden
  - 510th Regional Support Group, in Kaiserslautern
    - Headquarters and Headquarters Company, 510th Regional Support Group, in Kaiserslautern
    - 83rd Combat Sustainment Support Battalion, in Kaiserslautern
      - Headquarters and Headquarters Company, 83rd Combat Sustainment Support Battalion, in Kaiserslautern
    - 446th Transportation Battalion (Movement Control) (Echelon Above Corps — EAC), in Kaiserslautern
      - Headquarters and Headquarters Detachment, 446th Transportation Battalion (Movement Control) (EAC), in Kaiserslautern
      - 341st Transportation Detachment (Movement Control Team), in Grafenwöhr
      - 530th Transportation Detachment (Movement Control Team), in Grafenwöhr
      - 793rd Transportation Detachment (Movement Control Team), in Kaiserslautern
      - 1172nd Transportation Detachment (Movement Control Team), in Grafenwöhr
      - 1177th Transportation Detachment (Movement Control Team), in Kaiserslautern
    - 221st Public Affairs Detachment, in Kaiserslautern
    - 536th Signal Company, in Kaiserslautern
    - 589th Engineer Detachment (Forward Engineer Support Team — Advance) (FEST-A), in Kaiserslautern

== Insignia ==
=== Shoulder Sleeve Insignia ===
Description/Blazon: On an inverted yellow pentagon-shaped embroidered item issuing from base a stylized blue mill rind, the top ending in arrow points arched to the left and right, surmounted at center by a narrow red wedge, the sides arching inward superimposed at top by a red arrow point down, both with yellow outlines, all within a 1/8 inch (.32 cm) blue border. The dimension is 2 1/2 inches (6.35 cm) in height and width overall.

Symbolism: The colors are taken from the Seventh Army shoulder sleeve insignia. The mill rind refers to the 21st Theater Sustainment Command's shoulder sleeve insignia. The arrows suggest the ability to rapidly deploy in response to mission directives.

Background: The shoulder sleeve insignia was originally approved for the 7th Civil Support Command on 23 September 2009. It was redesignated for the 7th Mission Support Command with the description updated effective 1 October 2015.

=== Distinctive Unit Insignia ===
Description/Blazon: A silver color metal and enamel device 1 3/16 inches (3.02 cm) in width consisting of a sword, yellow hilt and hand guard, silver blade, with red flames, issuing from behind the sword seven arrows, pointing outwards, arrayed in a semi-circle, arranged in four colors from left to right, purple, white, buff and scarlet; the second, fourth and sixth arrows divided through the center in colors as follows: the second arrow-purple and white; fourth-white and buff and the sixth arrow-buff and red.

Symbolism: The four arrow colors indicate that the Command is tasked with a two-fold responsibility, those of the Civil Affairs and Support branches. The arrows arrayed as they are signify the capability to quickly mobilize in response to mission directives. The flaming sword is a symbol of the theater of operations, U.S. Army Europe. The seven points serve as a reminder of the Command's numerical designation.

Background: The distinctive unit insignia was originally approved for the 7th Civil Support Command on 23 September 2009. It was amended to correct the description and symbolism on 30 September 2009. The insignia was redesignated for the 7th Mission Support Command with the description updated effective 1 October 2015.
