= 409th Contracting Support Brigade =

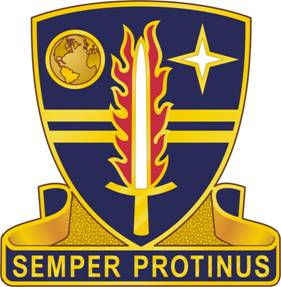
- Distinctive unit insignia
- Active: November 1, 2007 - present
- Country: United States
- Allegiance: United States Army Materiel Command
- Branch: United States Army
- Type: Support
- Size: Brigade
- Part of: 21st Theater Sustainment Command
- Garrison/HQ: Sembach, Germany
- Motto: "Semper Protinus" (Always Forward)
- Website: https://www.409csb.army.mil/

Commanders
- Current commander: COL Jarret S. Moffitt
- Command Sergeant Major: CSM Della S. Overton

Insignia
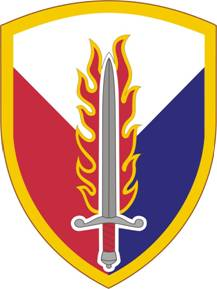
- Identification symbol: Former Unit SSI

- Identification symbol: Current Unit SSI United States Army Materiel Command

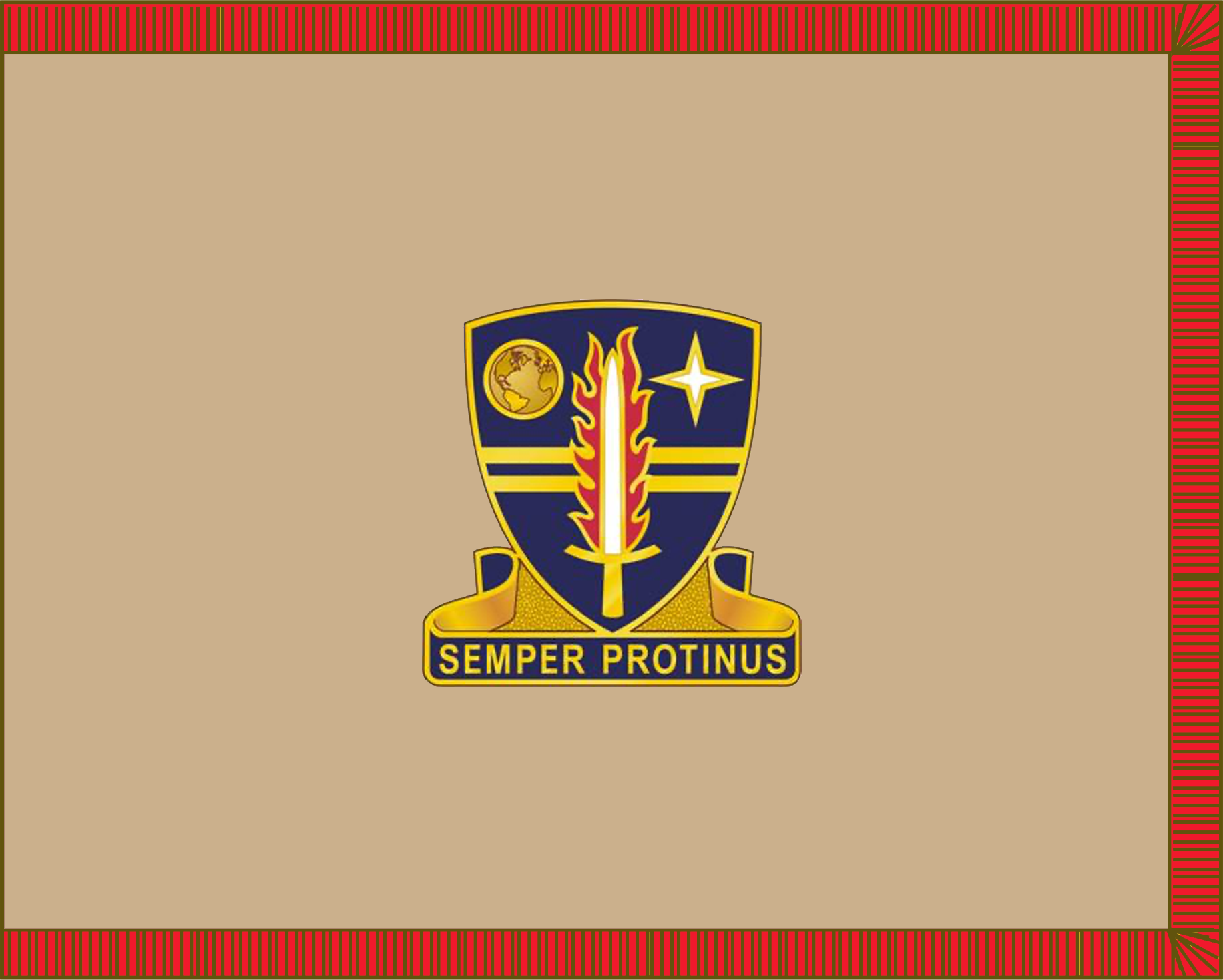
- 409th Contracting Support Brigade Flag

The 409th Contracting Support Brigade provides contract capability and procurement support to United States Army Europe and Africa.

The unit received the Army Superior Unit Award in 2023 for its support of Operation Warp Speed.

== Organization 2025 ==
As of December 2025 the brigade consists of the following units:

- 409th Contracting Support Brigade, in Sembach
  - 928th Contracting Battalion / Regional Contracting Office Bavaria, in Grafenwöhr
  - Theater Contracting Support Center, in Kaiserslautern
  - Regional Contracting Office Benelux, in Brussels (Belgium)
  - Regional Contracting Office Stuttgart, in Stuttgart
  - Regional Contracting Office Wiesbaden, in Wiesbaden
