= 266th Finance Support Center =

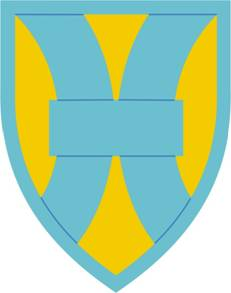
- Active: 1945-present
- Country: United States
- Branch: United States Army
- Role: Finance
- Size: Center
- Part of: 21st Theater Sustainment Command
- Garrison/HQ: Kaiserslautern, Germany
- Motto: First In Finance Support

Commanders
- Current commander: Colonel Lance M. Sneed

The 266th Finance Support Center is a unit of the 21st Theater Sustainment Command and a part of United States Army Europe and Africa. The unit war originally activated in England in 1945 as the 266th Finance Center. At some point after its activation it moved to Germany.

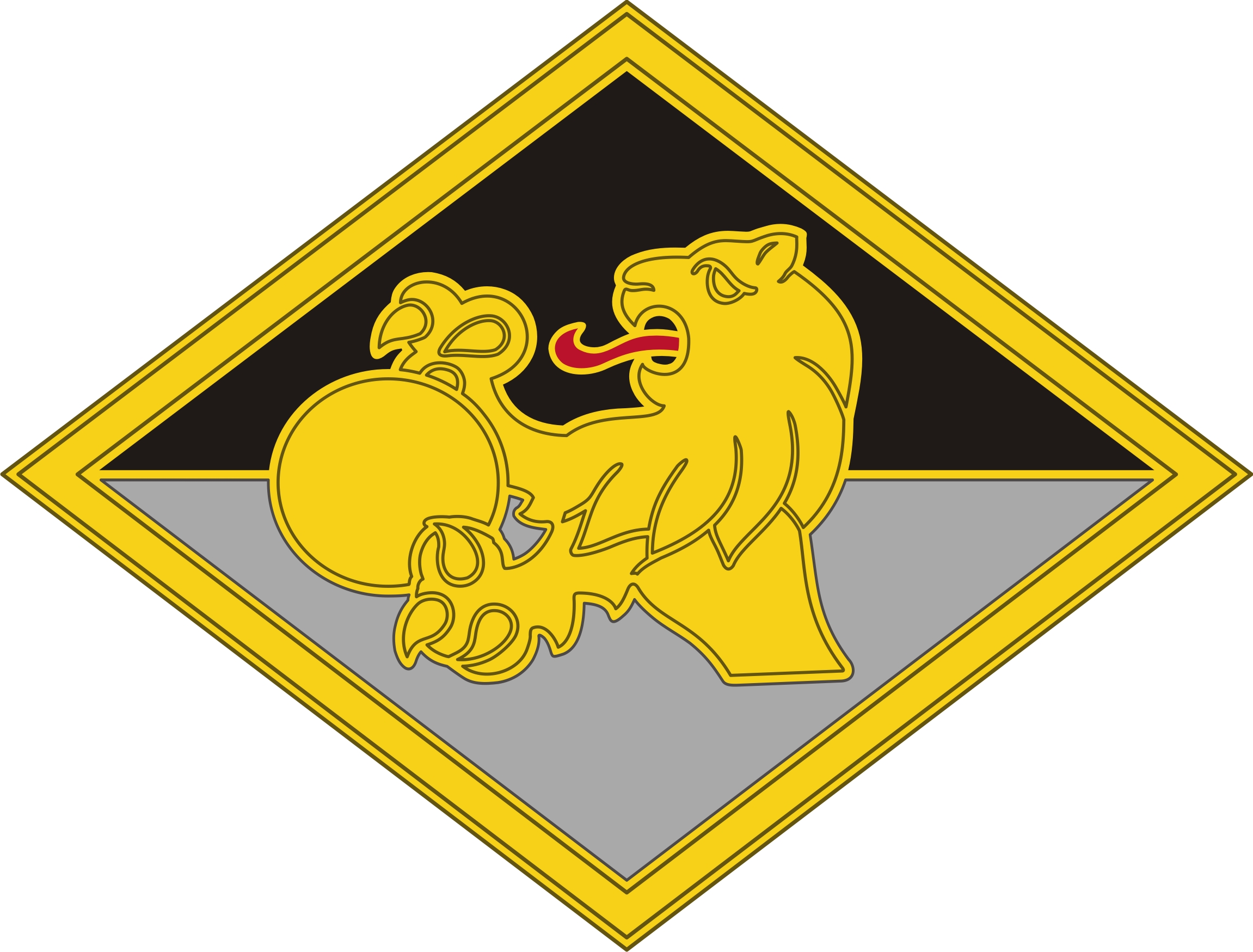
266th Finance Command SSI

In 1987 it was redesignated the 266th Theater Finance Center headquartered at Tompkins Barracks near Heidelberg. In January 1994 it was redesignated as the 266th Finance Command. The command was deactivated in 2008 and moved to Kaiserslautern to become the 266th Financial Management Center.

The unit earned a Meritorious Unit Citation during their rotation to Kuwait in 2021-22.
