= 408th Contracting Support Brigade =

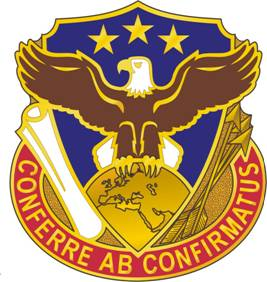
- Distinctive unit insignia
- Active: 2007 - present
- Country: United States
- Allegiance: United States Army
- Type: Combat service support unit
- Role: Arranging Contracts
- Part of: U.S. Army Materiel Command - Army Contracting Command (ACC)
- Garrison/HQ: Camp Arifjan, Kuwait/ Shaw AFB, South Carolina
- Nickname: 408th CSB
- Mottos: "CONFERRE AB CONFIRMATUS" (Focused and Determined)
- Website: ACC Homepage

Commanders
- Current commander: Colonel Gregory Howard Jr.

Insignia
- Identification symbol: Current SSI United States Army Materiel Command

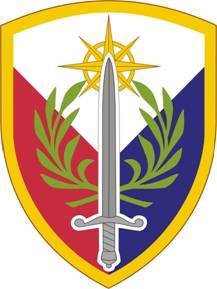
- Identification symbol: Former SSI 2007-2010

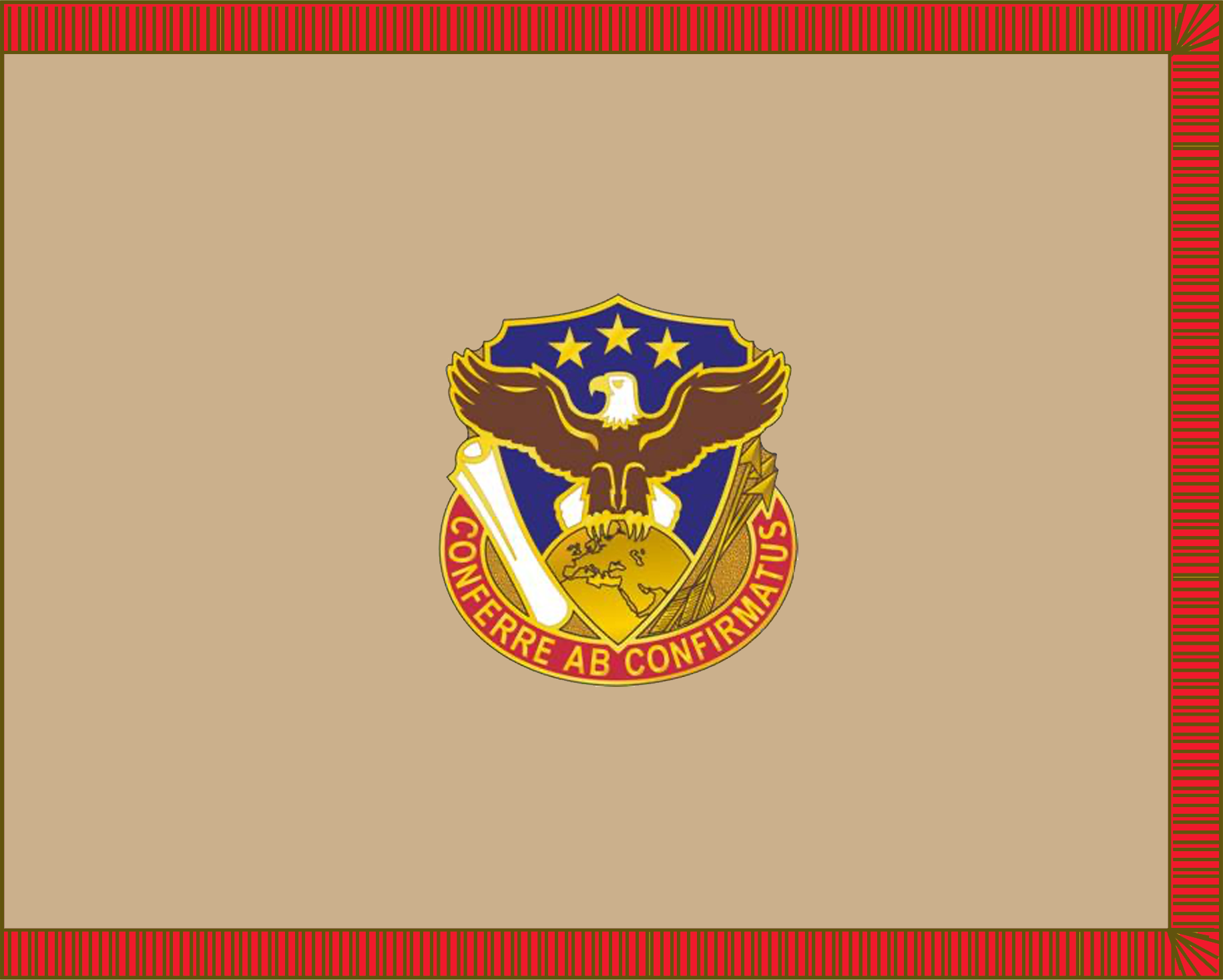
- 408th Contracting Support Brigade Flag

The 408th Contracting Support Brigade is a contracting support unit in the United States Army with headquarters at Camp Arifjan, Kuwait and Shaw Air Force Base, South Carolina. It is a unit in the United States Army Contracting Command.

The brigade provides operational contracting support to United States Army Central (USARCENT) as the Lead Contract Service throughout Southwest Asia. The brigade prepares and coordinates support plans, provides oversight, assessment, policy and acquisition authority to assigned contingency contracting organizations and contracting assets deployed in support of the USARCENT mission.

The unit received the Army Superior Unit Award in 2023 for its support of Operation Warp Speed.

== Commanders ==
Commander	Date assumed command
Colonel Joseph L. Bass	June 29, 2007
Colonel Shane Dietrich	June 6, 2008
Colonel Michael J. Rogers	June 25, 2010
Colonel David Kaczmarski	June 20, 2012
Colonel Phillip E. Smallwood	TBD
Colonel Michelle Sanner	June 15, 2016
Colonel Kim Thomas	June 19, 2017
Colonel Ralph T. Borja	June 22, 2018
Colonel Mary O.B. Drayton	June 27, 2019
Colonel Richard H. Pfeiffer, Jr.	June 26, 2020
Colonel Anthony Hughley	June 30, 2021
Colonel Justin DeArmond	July 15, 2022
Colonel Barry Williams	July 7, 2023
Colonel Robert Bartruff	June 24, 2024
Colonel Jamarcus Brooks	June 27, 2025
Colonel Gregory Howard Jr	June 18, 2026
