= James W. Monroe =

United States Army general

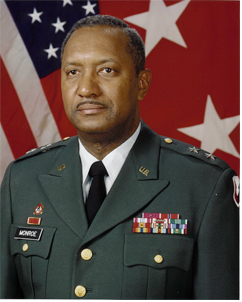
- Major General James W. Monroe
- Military career
- Allegiance: United States of America
- Branch: United States Army
- Service years: 1963–1998
- Rank: Major General
- Commands: 28th Chief of Ordnance (1994–1995)

Major General James W. Monroe is a retired general officer in the United States Army and served as the Commanding General of the United States Army Industrial Operations Command at Rock Island Arsenal, Illinois from 1995 to 1998. Prior to this, he served as the 28th Chief of Ordnance and Commandant of the U.S. Army Ordnance School at Aberdeen Proving Grounds, Maryland.

== Military education ==
Monroe graduated from West Virginia State College in 1963 with a bachelor's degree in Electrical Engineering and a commission as a Distinguished Military Graduate from the school's Reserve Officer Training Corps Program (ROTC). He also holds a master's degree in political science from the University of Cincinnati. His military education includes the Ordnance Officer Basic and Advanced Course, Armor Officer Basic Course, U.S. Army Command and General Staff College, and the Industrial College of the Armed Forces.

== Military career ==
Monroe began his career as a platoon leader for the 31st Ordnance Company, Fort Knox, Kentucky. Then, he went to Germany and was assigned to the 24th Infantry Division as a Platoon Leader for two armored cavalry platoons in the 9th Cavalry. After this, he assumed command of the 621st General Supply Company, United States Army Europe.

He returned to the U.S. to attend the Defense Language Institute at the U.S. Naval Station Anacostia, Washington D.C., with a follow-on tour as Ordnance Advisor to the United States Training Mission in Saudi Arabia from 1968 to 1969. After attendance at the Ordnance Officer Advanced Course, he accepted an assignment as assistant professor of military science, while studying to earn an M.A. in political science with a concentration in Middle Eastern Studies from the University of Cincinnati in 1973. Following this, he was assigned as a Strategic Intelligence Officer at the Office of the Assistant Chief of Staff for Intelligence for the Department of the Army.

Following attendance at the U.S. Army Command and General Staff College at Fort Leavenworth, Kansas, Monroe was assigned as the Company Commander for the 61st Maintenance Company in Korea. Upon return to the United States, he served as the Executive Officer for the 709th Maintenance Battalion at Fort Lewis, Washington and as Commander of the Division Materiel and Management Center for Division Support Command for the 9th Infantry Division at Fort Lewis. Monroe returned to Germany to take command of the 71st Maintenance Battalion in 1982.

Following a one-year tour at the Industrial College of the Armed Forces, he served for a year as a faculty member at the National Defense University at Fort Lesley J. McNair, Washington D.C. Next, he reported to Fort Stewart, Georgia to take command of Division Support Command for the 24th Infantry Division (Mechanized) in 1987. Following command at Fort Stewart, he served as the Assistant Chief of Staff, G-4 (Logistics) for the U.S. Third Army at Fort McPherson, Georgia and then, as the Deputy Chief of Staff for Logistics and Deputy for Host Nation Support at U.S. Central Command during Operation Desert Storm.

Monroe was promoted to Brigadier General in 1991 and assigned as Deputy Commanding General for Systems and Logistics for the U.S. Army Tank-Automotive Command in Warren, Michigan. While in this position, he received a temporary assignment, first as the Deputy Commander, and later as the Commanding General of the U.S. Army Materiel Command's Logistics Support Group during the Hurricane Andrew relief efforts.

In 1994, he was selected to be the 28th Chief of Ordnance and Commanding General of the U.S. Army Ordnance Center and School at Aberdeen Proving Ground, Maryland. In this assignment, he was instrumental in reorganizing and stabilizing the Ordnance School's workforce after the turbulence caused by the establishment of the Combined Arms Support Command.

In 1995, he culminated his career as he assumed command of the U.S. Army Industrial Operations Command (IOC) at Rock Island Arsenal, Illinois. This newly established command encompassed the Army's arsenals, depots, plants, and prepositioned stocks and contained 80 per cent of the Army's industrial base with assets totaling over $27 billion. Under his leadership, the IOC matured into a worldwide command linking more than 23,000 military and civilian personnel and 11,000 contractor personnel located in 25 states and 8 overseas locations to the United States defense industry.

Major General Monroe retired in 1998 after 35 years of service to the Army.

== Awards and decorations ==
Major General Monroe's decorations include the Legion of Merit (four awards), Bronze Star, Defense Meritorious Service Medal, Meritorious Service Medal (five awards), Army Commendation Medal, National Defense Service Medal (two awards), Humanitarian Service Medal, Southwest Asia Service Medal, Army Service Ribbon, the Overseas Service Ribbon (five awards), and the Kuwait Liberation Medal.

Military offices
Preceded by General John G. Coburn	Chief of Ordnance of the United States Army; 1994 - 1995	Succeeded by Major General Robert D. Shadley
