= James Ball =

James or Jim Ball may refer to:

- James Ball (cyclist) (born 1991), Welsh Paralympic cyclist
- James Ball (economist) (1933–2018), emeritus professor of economics at London Business School
- Jimmy Ball (football manager) (born 1975 or 1976), English football manager
- James Ball (footballer) (born 1995), English footballer
- James Ball (journalist), British investigative journalist and author
- James Dyer Ball (1847–1919), sinologist
- James Presley Ball (1825–1904), African-American daguerreotypist, abolitionist, and businessman
- James W. Ball (born 1939), U.S. Army General and 24th Chief of Ordnance
- Jim Ball (baseball) (1884–1963), Major League Baseball player
- Jim Ball (radio personality), Australian radio personality
- Jimmy Ball (athlete) (1903–1988), Canadian athlete
