= General Ruggles =

General Ruggles may refer to:

- Colden Ruggles (1869–1933), U.S. Army brigadier general
- Daniel Ruggles (1810–1897), Confederate States Army brigadier general
- George D. Ruggles (1833–1904), U.S. Army brigadier general

== See also ==
- Harold Ruggles-Brise (1864–1927), British Army major general
