= General Dickinson =

General Dickinson may refer to:

- Douglas Dickinson (1886–1949), British Army lieutenant general
- James H. Dickinson (born c. 1962), U.S. Army general
- John Dickinson (1732–1808), Pennsylvania Militia brigadier general in the American Revolutionary War
- Philemon Dickinson (1739–1809), New Jersey Militia brigadier general in the American Revolutionary War
- Thomas R. Dickinson (born 1945), U.S. Army brigadier general
