= Anthony Acevedo =

United States Army soldier

Anthony C. Acevedo
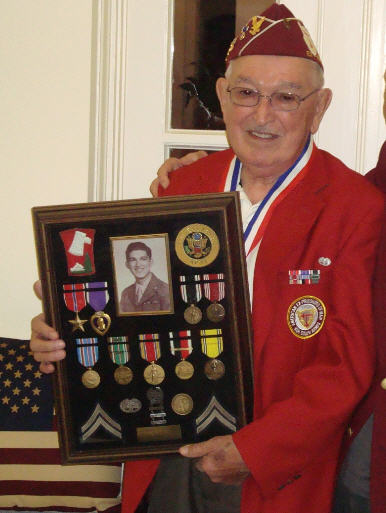
- Acevedo pictured here in 2010 at Pasadena CA courthouse honoring Veterans.
- Born: Anthony Claude Acevedo; July 31, 1924; San Bernardino, California, US
- Died: February 11, 2018 (aged 93); Loma Linda, California, US
- Occupation: Design Engineer
- Known for: Berga concentration camp diary
- Spouses: Amparo "Chita" Martinez; Maria Dolores
- Children: 4
- Military career
- Burial place: Riverside National Cemetery; Riverside, California, United States
- Allegiance: United States
- Branch: US Army
- Rank: Corporal
- Nickname: "Tony"
- Conflicts: World War II; Ardennes-Rhineland; Central Europe
- Awards: Combat Medical Badge; Bronze Star; Purple Heart; Prisoner of War; Good Conduct Medal; American Campaign Medal; European-African-Middle Eastern Campaign Medal (3); World War II Victory Medal; Army of Occupation Medal with German Clasp; Overseas Service Bars; Belgian Commemorative Medal of the 1940–1945 War

Anthony Claude Acevedo (July 31, 1924 – February 11, 2018) was an American soldier during World War II. Acevedo's experiences as a prisoner of war in the Berga concentration camp, a subcamp of Buchenwald, became instrumental in documenting Nazi atrocities against American POWs. Notably, Acevedo kept a detailed diary during his captivity, recording the deaths and suffering of his fellow soldiers, which later served as crucial evidence of the camp's brutality.

Acevedo was born in San Bernardino, California, to a Mexican-American family, He enlisted in the U.S. Army in 1942. Captured during the Battle of the Bulge, he was wrongly classified as Jewish and sent to Berga, where he endured severe torture, including rape, and witnessed unspeakable horrors.

Acevedo dedicated his postwar life to advocating for veterans, particularly those suffering from post-traumatic stress disorder (PTSD), and contributed significantly to raising awareness about the Berga survivors' plight. His diary, now housed at the United States Holocaust Memorial Museum, is a significant historical record of Nazi war crimes. Acevedo's life story also highlighted the US government's delayed recognition of the suffering of Berga survivors.

== Early life ==
Acevedo was born in San Bernardino, California, on July 31, 1924, to Francisco Guillermo Acevedo, an engineer from Mexico, and Maria Louisa Contreras (née Limantur) Acevedo. His early education was in San Bernardino, where he attended a local school for non-white students. Anthony's mother died when he was two years of age. Four years after his first wife's death, his father remarried to a woman with an identical first and middle name, Maria Louisa Morgan. Acevedo's stepmother was deported to Mexico sometime later. In addition, the Great Depression had made finding employment difficult in the United States. As a result, his father moved the family to Durango, Mexico in 1937. Acevedo's father found employment as an engineer in Mexico City with the Pan-American Highway, and eventually became an official for the Federal Mexican Government.

As a teenager, Acevedo and a friend intercepted radio messages sent in Morse code from German agents operating in Mexico to a German submarine in coastal waters. As a result, the agents were captured and tried in court.

== Education and draft ==
From an early age Acevedo desired to become a physician. Acevedo graduated from Durango Institute of Technology. An American citizen by birthplace, he was summoned by the draft in 1942. Acevedo left Mexico to report for the draft, partly out of American patriotism awakened by the Pearl Harbor bombing, and partly to distance himself from his father. Reporting to an induction center in Pasadena, California, he was informed his Durango schooling was insufficient, so he completed an additional semester.

He was first assigned to Fort MacArthur in California. The Governor of Durango had sent papers informing the U.S. Armed Forces of Acevedo's desire to become a doctor. He was therefore sent to O'Reilly General Hospital to receive medical training. After training he was sent to Camp Adair in Oregon and attached to the 91st Infantry Division. When this unit shipped out to Italy, Acevedo was not amongst them, as he had acquired a case of the measles. Instead, he was reassigned to Company B of the 70th Infantry Division, which was also at Camp Adair. This division was deployed to Marseilles in December 1944, crossing the ocean on the USS West Point. At this time Acevedo held the rank of Corporal.

== Capture and incarceration ==
Acevedo was captured during the Battle of the Bulge on January 6, 1945. Initially, Acevedo was sent to the Stalag IX-B prison camp, and he spent a few weeks there. Eventually a Nazi commander arrived and declared that all Jews should step forward. Few did so, and therefore those who "looked like Jews" or appeared otherwise "undesirable" were selected. The Nazis were unfamiliar with Latin Americans, and he was summarily classified as Jewish and sent to the death camp at Berga, designed for American soldiers of Jewish descent. He was shipped by railcar, arriving at Berga on February 8, 1945.

At Berga, he kept a diary which listed in detail the death of each soldier, along with the medical details of the soldiers he looked after, as he felt it was his "moral obligation" as a medic. This diary also recorded notes on every detail of the camp and camp life that Acevedo saw, and he came to view this diary as his "lifeline". He kept the diary secret from the Nazi guards by hiding it variously in his pants or in the barracks.

Berga was designed to work the prisoners to death through a program the Nazis called "Vernichtung Durch Arbeit," but Acevedo attempted to keep his fellows alive insofar as possible. He did this by "cooking", adding cats, grass, rats, sand, wood shavings and other material to the 3.5 grams (0.12 oz) of bread they received on some days. He also kept up morale with his genial attitude, mixed with jokes.

Acevedo himself was subject to abuses at the hands of the Gestapo, including being raped as part of his torture. Part of the reason for Acevedo's torture was the role he had played in the capture of German espionage agents when he lived in Mexico as a teenager. On April 23, 1945, the camp was evacuated in the face of the approaching Allied armies. The prisoners were subjected to a 150-mile (240 km) death march. Between the camp and the march, fewer than half of the Berga prisoners survived. Acevedo was rescued later that month, weighing only 87 pounds (39 kg).

In camp, Acevedo received correspondence and care packages from a woman named Maria Dolores. He established a romantic relationship with her, and they became engaged to be married, having never met in person.

Acevedo and other survivors of Berga were instructed to sign a document that swore them to secrecy regarding their experiences at the Nazi camp. The U.S. Army maintains it was to protect escapees and the local populace who helped POWs, but it deeply hurt Acevedo that he was unable to share his experiences.

== Postwar ==
After the war, Acevedo traveled back to Mexico. On the train ride there he made the acquaintance of Amparo "Chita" Martinez, a young woman who was a neighbor of an army friend. When he arrived home, Acevedo's father confronted him regarding his relationship with Martinez, in view of Anthony's engagement to Maria Dolores. The argument further escalated when his father accused him of cowardice because he "let himself be captured", and his father further stated that Acevedo should have "killed himself". Acevedo was infuriated and immediately left home, taking his few unpacked belongings, moved back to the United States, and married Martinez. He did not see or speak to his parents for several years. Dolores was deeply hurt by the dissolution of the engagement.

After the war Acevedo worked for a time as a surgical technician, and wished to continue his medical studies with the goal of becoming a medical doctor. This never came to fruition; instead he made a career as a design engineer for McDonnell Douglas, North American Aviation, and the Hughes Aircraft Company.

Acevedo eventually divorced Martinez, and was re-introduced to Dolores through a mutual friend. Acevedo and Dolores married in the 1980s.

Acevedo retired in 1987 and until 2017 he lived in Yucaipa, California. After retirement PTSD affected him considerably; he would wake up sweating and screaming in the middle of the night among other effects. The bulk of his retirement was spent volunteering at Veterans Affairs hospitals to assist patients with PTSD, in part to help himself cope with the same issues.

Dolores Acevedo died in 2014. The last year of Acevedo's life was spent living with family members in Rancho Cucamonga, California. Acevedo died on February 11, 2018, at the Loma Linda Veterans Affairs Medical Center of congestive heart failure and chronic obstructive pulmonary disease.

== Personal life and beliefs ==
You only live once. Let's keep trucking. If we don't do that, who's going to do it for us? We have to be happy. Why hate?

— Anthony Acevedo

Acevedo had two sisters and three brothers between his father's two marriages. He recalled his childhood as abusive, having received abuse from his father and from his nanny, but believed this experience gave him the strength to survive the Nazi death-camp.

He and his first wife, Chita, had three boys and one girl. Acevedo practiced the Roman Catholic faith. His main interests included barbecuing, reading books about World War II, and spending time with his family. He believed that the U.S. Government intentionally covered up the abuse of Americans at Berga, and that this action significantly added to the affected soldiers' suffering. When the government finally did give official recognition, Acevedo refused to attend as it was held in Orlando instead of Washington D.C.

Although his treatment by the United States was often less than optimal, throughout his life he was highly patriotic towards the country he had served. He identified with US conservative politics, but felt betrayed by later conservative stances on immigration, stating, "They don't know shit from Shinola". When one of his sons discovered his Armed Forces psychiatric evaluation a few months before his death, he also found out that his father had been raped by the Nazis. Acevedo was glad about the discovery, saying, "I'm glad you found it... I want you to tell everyone what I went through and how I struggled with the nightmares," so mankind could see "this is how low man can get".

== Legacy ==
On June 1, 2004, Acevedo was recognized in the United States House of Representatives by Joe Baca, who cited Acevedo's patriotism and forbearance, calling him a "symbol of all that we, as Americans, strive to be". In 2008, an investigative report by CNN based on interviews with Acevedo was the catalyst for the U.S. government to finally acknowledge the experiences of the American soldiers held in the Berga concentration camp. Accordingly, Maj. Gen. Vincent E. Boles met with some of the Berga survivors to honor them with flags flown over The Pentagon a few months later.

Acevedo's Berga diary is housed at the United States Holocaust Memorial Museum, the first such document created by an American captive to be included. The museum also took oral history from Acevedo in both English and Spanish. He became the first Mexican-American to be registered, in 2010, as a survivor at the museum's database. His personal experiences enhanced Mexican-American understanding of the Holocaust.

== Bibliography ==
- Whitlock, Flint (2009). Given Up For Dead: American GIs in the Nazi Concentration Camp at Berga. Basic Books. p. 7. ISBN 9780786736645.
