= Mitchell H. Stevenson =

United States Army general

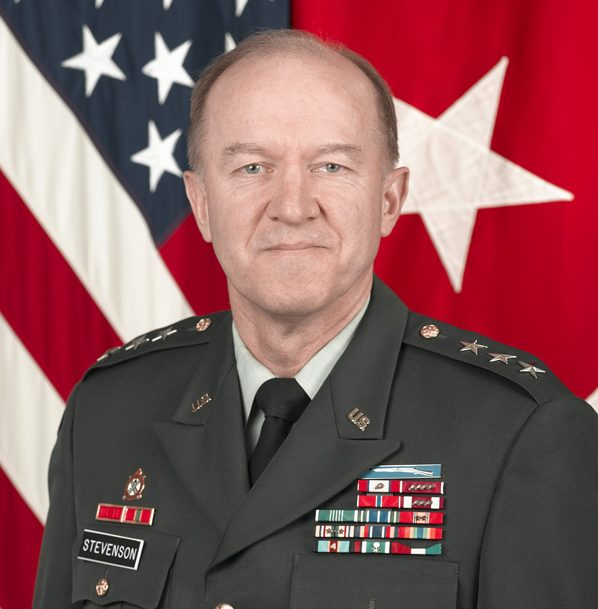
- Mitchell H. Stevenson as a Lieutenant General
- Born: December 25, 1952 (age 73); Linz, Austria
- Military career
- Allegiance: United States of America
- Branch: United States Army
- Service years: 1974–2012
- Rank: Lieutenant General
- Commands: 31st Chief of Ordnance (2000–2003)

Lieutenant General Mitchell H. Stevenson (born December 25, 1952) is a retired general officer in the United States Army and served as the Deputy Chief of Staff, G-4, United States Army. He served as the Commanding General of the U.S. Army Combined Arms Support Command at Fort Lee, Virginia. Prior to this assignment, he served as the 31st Chief of Ordnance and Commandant of the U.S. Army Ordnance School at Aberdeen Proving Grounds, Maryland.

== Military education ==
Stevenson was born on December 25, 1952, in Linz, Austria, the son of a career Army Noncommissioned Officer. He was a Distinguished Military Graduate and was commissioned a Regular Army officer from the Reserve Officer Training Corps (ROTC) program at West Virginia University in May 1974. He also holds a Master of Science Degree in Logistics Management from Florida Institute of Technology. His military education includes the Infantry Officer Basic Course, the Ordnance Officer Advanced Course, the U.S. Army Command and General Staff College, and the Army War College.

== Military career ==
After an initial detail as a Rifle Platoon Leader in C Company, 1st Battalion, 2nd Infantry Regiment, 1st Infantry Division (Mechanized) at Fort Riley, Kansas, Stevenson transferred to the Ordnance branch in March 1976.

Following his transfer to the Ordnance Branch, Stevenson's initial assignments were with the 701st Maintenance Battalion at Fort Riley, Kansas. Initially, he served as a Shop Officer, followed by command of 'B' Company, and finally as the Battalion S-1 (Personnel). Upon completion of his assignment with the 701st, Stevenson attended the Ordnance Officer Advanced Course at Aberdeen Proving Ground, Maryland.

Upon completion, Stevenson traveled to Germany for his next assignment with the 122nd Maintenance Battalion, 3rd Armored Division. From February 1980 until November 1981, he commanded Company ‘D’, the Forward Support Maintenance Company. Afterwards, he served as the Materiel Officer for the battalion. Stevenson went to Fort Leavenworth, Kansas to attend the Army Command and General Staff College in June 1982, followed by follow-on schooling at Fort Lee, Virginia and the Florida Institute of Technology where he earned a Master of Science in Logistics Management.

His next assignment took him to the Army's Tank-Automotive Command (TACOM) in Warren, Michigan From November 1983 until January 1985, he served as the Aide-de-Camp to the Commanding General of TACOM. After serving as a Contracting Officer in the Directorate of Procurement and Production for a year, he was selected to be the Executive Officer to the Commanding General of TACOM for 1986.

Upon return to Germany, Stevenson served as the Support Operations Officer for the 703rd Support Battalion, 3rd Infantry Division from January 1987 to October 1988. Next, he was assigned as the Division Materiel Management Officer for the 3rd Infantry Division. From April 1990 to May 1992, Stevenson commanded the 724th Main Support Battalion, 24th Infantry Division at Fort Stewart, Georgia. During this time, his unit participated in Gulf War.

Upon completion of senior Army education at the Army War College at Carlisle, Pennsylvania between May 1992 and June 1993, Stevenson commanded the Division Support Command for the 3rd Infantry Division in Germany for two years. Stevenson returned to Washington D.C. for an assignment as the Executive Officer to the Deputy Chief of Staff for Logistics in October 1995. Upon completion of Executive Officer responsibilities, he shifted to become the Director of Plans and Operations in the Office of the Deputy Chief of Staff of Logistics. In June 1998, he returned for his final assignment overseas in Germany as the Deputy Chief of Staff for Logistics for United States Army – Europe and Seventh Army.

In July 2000, Stevenson became the 31st Chief of Ordnance and Commandant of the Ordnance Center and School at Aberdeen Proving Ground, Maryland. Following a two-year assignment beginning in August 2003 as the Deputy Chief of Staff for Logistics and Operations for the U.S. Army Materiel Command, he became the Commanding General of the U.S. Army Combined Arms Support Command. In June 2008, he was selected as the U.S. Army Deputy Chief of Staff for Logistics (G-4).

Lieutenant General Mitchell H. Stevenson retired on January 1, 2012.

== Awards and decorations ==
Stevenson's awards and decorations include the Distinguished Service Medal (with oak leaf cluster), Legion of Merit (with 4 oak leaf clusters), Bronze Star Medal, the Meritorious Service Medal (with 3 oak leaf clusters), the Army Commendation Medal, the Army Achievement Medal, and the Expert Infantryman Badge.

Military offices
Preceded by Major General Dennis K. Jackson	Chief of Ordnance of the United States Army; 2000–2003	Succeeded by Major General William M. Lenaers
