= Bochenek =

Bochenek (Polish pronunciation: [bɔˈxɛnɛk]) is a Polish surname meaning loaf (of bread). It is most frequent in southern Poland. The surname may refer to:

- Dominik Bochenek (born 1987), Polish athlete
- Grace Bochenek, American industrial engineer
- Jan Bochenek (1931–2011), Polish weightlifter
- Krystyna Bochenek (1953–2010), Polish politician
- Mateusz Bochenek (born 1993), Polish politician
