= Thomas R. Dickinson =

United States Army general

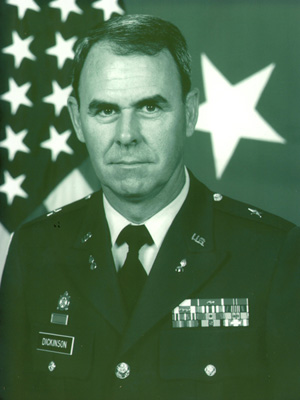
- Brigadier General Thomas R. Dickinson
- Military career
- Allegiance: United States of America
- Branch: United States Army
- Service years: 1967 - 1998
- Rank: Brigadier General
- Commands: 29th Chief of Ordnance (1997 - 1998)

Brigadier General Thomas R. Dickinson (born April 1, 1945) is a retired general officer in the United States Army and served as the 29th Chief of Ordnance and Commandant of the U.S. Army Ordnance School at Aberdeen Proving Grounds, Maryland.

== Military education ==
Born in Charleston, South Carolina, on April 1, 1945, Dickinson graduated from The Citadel, The Military College of South Carolina in 1967 with a Bachelor of Science degree in Business Administration and a commission as a Second Lieutenant through the school's Reserve Officer Training Corps (ROTC) program. He also holds a Masters of Science degree in Logistics Management and a Masters of Business Administration degree, both from the Florida Institute of Technology. His military education includes the Armor Officer Basic Course, the Ordnance Officer Advanced Course, the U.S. Army Command and General Staff College, and the Air War College.

== Military career ==
Initially detailed to duty as an Armor officer, he began his Army career as a platoon leader in the 2nd Squadron, 6th Armored Cavalry Regiment at Fort Meade, Maryland, followed by Ordnance assignments as Adjutant, 62nd Maintenance Battalion, 45th General Support Group; and Commander, 794th Maintenance Company, 62nd Maintenance Battalion, both in Vietnam.

From 1971 to 1973, following attendance at the Ordnance Officer Advanced Course, Dickinson served as Instructor and Tactical Officer for the Ordnance Officer Basic Course at Aberdeen Proving Ground, Maryland. He went on to serve in a series of important command and staff positions, to include: Commander, C Company, 704th Maintenance Battalion, 4th Infantry Division (Mechanized) Fort Carson, Colorado; Maintenance Officer, Materiel Support Branch, J-4 (Logistics), Combined Forces Command/United States Forces - Korea; and Chief, Supply Systems Branch, Combat Development Directorate, U.S. Army Quartermaster School at Fort Lee, Virginia.

Following attendance at the U.S. Army Command and General Staff College at Fort Leavenworth, Kansas, Dickinson served as the Materiel Officer and Battalion Executive Officer for the 71st Maintenance Battalion, VII Corps, United States Army Europe and Seventh Army in Nuremberg, Germany. In 1985, he was selected to be the Commander of the 704th Main Support Battalion, 4th Infantry Division at Fort Carson. Following his command tour, he attended the Air War College at Maxwell Air Force Base, Alabama. In 1988, he reported as the Director of Readiness at the U.S. Army Tank Automotive Command at Warren, Michigan followed by an assignment as the Commander of the 4th Training Brigade, U.S. Army Training Center at Fort Jackson, South Carolina.

From 1993 to 1994, Dickinson served as Assistant Commandant of the U.S. Army Ordnance Center and School at Aberdeen Proving Ground, Maryland. Shortly, after assuming this assignment, he revitalized hands-on recovery training by retrofitting the school's aging recovery fleet with overhauled M578 and M88 recovery vehicles from the U.S. Army Tank-Automotive Command. In 1994, he also planned and coordinated the transfer of the Ordnance Combat and Training Development Directorates from the Ordnance Center & School to the newly reorganized and expanded U.S. Army Combined Arms Support Command at Fort Lee, Virginia.

In January 1995, Dickinson assumed the post of Deputy Commanding General and executive director of Industrial Operations, U.S. Army Industrial Operations Command, Rock Island Arsenal, Illinois; and subsequently as the Commanding General of the 13th Corps Support Command at Fort Hood, Texas.

Dickinson culminated his career as the 29th Chief of Ordnance and Commanding General of the U.S. Army Ordnance Center and School from 1997 to 1998. During his tenure, he assumed responsibility for training more than 63,000 Ordnance soldiers and was an admirable proponent for the Corps. Among other accomplishments, he promoted modular maintenance concepts that would support force projection and joint and combined operations, and developed new organizational structures to support the Force XXI Army. He also championed the force modernization necessary to support these new concepts and organizations, most notably by securing funds for the Forward Repair System. In addition, he revived a financially struggling Ordnance Corps Association by organizing an annual golf tournament and commissioning a series of Ordnance prints by artist, Don Stivers.

Dickinson retired in 1998 after 31 years of service to the Army.

== Awards and decorations ==
Dickinson's awards and decorations include the Distinguished Service Medal (with oak leaf cluster), Legion of Merit (with 2 oak leaf clusters), Bronze Star Medal, the Meritorious Service Medal (with 3 oak leaf clusters), the Joint Service Commendation Medal, the Army Commendation Medal, and the Army Achievement Medal.

Military offices
Preceded by Major General Robert D. Shadley	Chief of Ordnance of the United States Army; 1997 - 1998	Succeeded by Major General Dennis K. Jackson
