= William Estel Potts =

United States Army general (1935–2004)

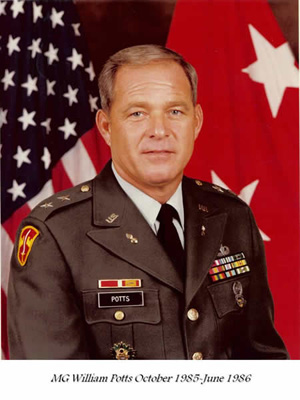
- Major General William E. Potts
- Born: December 9, 1935; Nashville, Tennessee, U.S.
- Died: February 29, 2004 (aged 68)
- Burial place: Arlington National Cemetery
- Military career
- Allegiance: United States
- Branch: United States Army
- Service years: 1958–1988
- Rank: Major General
- Commands: Chief of Ordnance; 702nd Maintenance Battalion
- Conflicts: Vietnam War
- Awards: Army Distinguished Service Medal; Defense Superior Service Medal

Major General William Estel Potts (December 9, 1935 – February 29, 2004) was a career officer in the United States Army and served as the 22nd Chief of Ordnance for the United States Army Ordnance Corps.

== Early life ==
Potts was born in Nashville, Tennessee, December 9, 1935. He played halfback on his high school football team in Columbia, Tennessee, when it won the state championship. He attended Vanderbilt University on a football scholarship. In 1955, this Vanderbilt team went to the Gator Bowl, where they defeated Auburn. At Vanderbilt, he entered the Reserves Officer Training Corps (ROTC) and graduated with a reserve commission in 1958.

== Military career ==
Upon graduation, Potts joined the Transportation Corps and attended the basic transportation course at Fort Eustis. After a follow-on course at Aberdeen Proving Ground, Maryland, he remained at the Ordnance School as commander of the 7th Enlisted Training Company, School Troops. In 1961, he attended Airborne School at Fort Benning, Georgia. In 1962, he received a Master of Education degree from Gonzaga University. Next, he went to Fort Campbell, Kentucky to serve with the 101st Airborne Division. During this tour, he served as the shop officer for the 801st Maintenance Battalion, Company Commander of Company B of the 801st, Company Commander of Company A of the 801st, and finally adjutant and Company Commander for Headquarters, Division Support Command of the 101st Airborne. Potts then went to Vietnam in 1964 as a maintenance and supply advisor attached to I Corps.

Potts returned to Aberdeen Proving Ground as an instructor, and then as chief of the Mobility Training Department for the Ordnance School. In 1967, by then a major, he was detailed to Monterey, California, to attend the Defense Language Institute as a student of Turkish in preparation for an assignment as the assistant military attache in that country. This course was followed by a six month course in intelligence in Washington. In July 1968, Potts began a highly productive three-and-a-half-year tour in Ankara, Turkey. Promoted to lieutenant colonel in July 1970, he was sent to Fort Leavenworth to attend the Command and General Staff course in 1971. Upon completion of his studies in 1972, he went to Korea for service as commander of the 702nd Maintenance Battalion of the 2d Infantry Division.

In 1974, Potts completed a Master's degree in Public Administration at Middle Tennessee State University. Then, he went to Washington, where he served as Chief of the Ordnance/Chemical Assignment Branch, Officer Personnel Directorate, Military Personnel Center at the Pentagon, with a follow-on assignment as the Chief of the Ordnance Branch there. In 1977, he completed the course at the Industrial College of the Armed Forces and promoted to colonel. In the next three years, he was successively Logistics Staff Officer in the Readiness Directorate, Office of the Deputy Chief of Staff for Logistics at the Pentagon; Commander, Division Support Command, 82nd Airborne Division; and Executive Officer in the Office of the Deputy Chief of Staff for Logistics.

Promoted to brigadier general in April 1981, Potts was then named Deputy Commanding General for Readiness and then Deputy Commanding General for Research and Development at the United States Army Missile Command, Huntsville, Alabama. Following a one year tour as Director of Readiness at the United StatesArmy Materiel Development and Readiness Command in Alexandria, Virginia, Potts received his second star, and in November, 1983, was named commanding general of the Army's Ordnance Center and School at Aberdeen Proving Ground. He was formally appointed to the reconstituted Office of Chief of Ordnance on October 28, 1985, the first to hold that proud and historic position in over twenty-three years.

Potts' tenure as Chief of Ordnance was marked by improvements in unit and individual training, improved methods of identifying and securing the best qualified men and women to serve as Ordnance Officers (including improvements in ROTC training and officer procurement), and the stimulation of interest among Warrant Officer candidates in technical career fields. He also oversaw the development of a full-scale training program for Warrant Officers and the revision of the Ordnance Officer Advanced Course to more accurately reflect the demands being placed upon ordnance leadership in the modern army.

In the area of combat developments, ongoing studies of unit readiness, recovery capabilities, maintenance productivity, support, and readiness, and of support operations plans and concepts posed new challenges to the Ordnance Corps in the school room and in the field. The concept of a master diagnostician who was to provide improved battlefield maintenance support was developed and implemented. The U.S. Army Ordnance Center and School systematically evaluated the performance of its graduates, and incorporated its findings in to the ongoing instructional program. That program was also enhanced by the expansion and upgrading of the Ordnance School's physical plant during Potts' tenure.

The Ordnance Corps was the first of the combat support and service branches of the Army to secure approval of its plans for integration into the Army's new Regimental System in October 1985. General Potts also succeeded in getting a single Ordnance Enlisted Assignment Branch established at the Military Personnel Center at the Pentagon. The Ordnance Center and School also produced increasing quantities of doctrinal literature. Considerable emphasis was placed on standardization, both within Ordnance, in cooperation with other branches of the Army and other services, and to some extent in conjunction with other NATO forces, notably those of Great Britain and West Germany.

In 1986, Potts was transferred to Ankara, Turkey, as Chief, Joint United States Military Mission for Aid to Turkey. He retired from the army on July 29, 1986 and entered private business.

He was buried at Arlington National Cemetery, in Arlington, Virginia.

Military offices
Preceded by Horace F. Bigelow	Chief of Ordnance of the United States Army; 1985–1986	Succeeded by Leon E. Salomon
