= Johnnie E. Wilson =

United States Army general

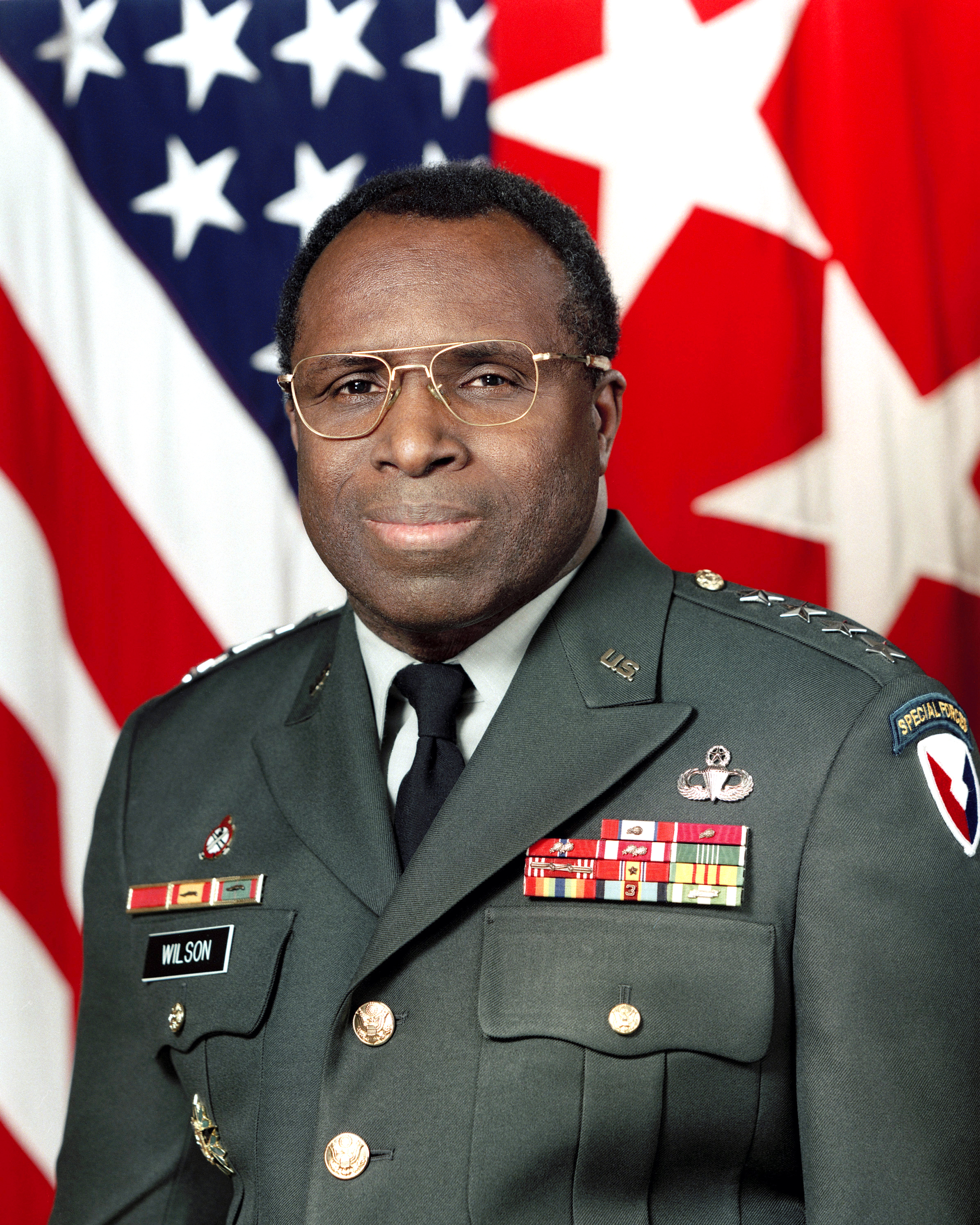
- General Johnnie E. Wilson
- Born: 9 February 1944 (age 82); Baton Rouge, Louisiana, U.S.
- Military career
- Allegiance: United States
- Branch: United States Army
- Service years: 1961–1999
- Rank: General
- Commands: United States Army Materiel Command; 13th Support Command; Chief of Ordnance
- Conflicts: Vietnam War
- Awards: Army Distinguished Service Medal (2); Legion of Merit (2); Bronze Star Medal (3)
- Other work: President and Chief Operating Officer, Dimensions International, Inc.

General Johnnie Edward Wilson (born 4 February 1944) is a retired United States Army four-star general who served as Commanding General, United States Army Materiel Command from 1996 to 1999. He also served as the 25th Chief of Ordnance for the United States Army Ordnance Corps.

== Military career ==
Wilson was born on 5 February 1944, in Baton Rouge, Louisiana. He was raised in Lorain, Ohio, and entered the United States Army in August 1961 as an enlisted soldier, attaining the rank of staff sergeant before attending Officer Candidate School (OCS). Upon completion of OCS in 1967, he was commissioned a second lieutenant in the Ordnance Corps. He was awarded a Bachelor of Science degree in Business Administration from the University of Nebraska at Omaha. He also holds a Master of Science degree in Logistics Management from the Florida Institute of Technology. His military education includes completion of the Ordnance Officer Basic and Advanced Courses, the Army Command and General Staff College, and the Industrial College of the Armed Forces.

Wilson held a wide variety of command and staff positions, culminating in his assignment as the Commanding General, United States Army Materiel Command. Other key assignments include: Deputy Chief of Staff for Logistics, Department of the Army, Pentagon; Chief of Staff, United States Army Materiel Command; Commanding General, Ordnance Center and School, Aberdeen Proving Ground, Maryland; Deputy Commanding General, 21st Area Theater Command, United States Army Europe and 7th Army; Commander, 13th Support Command, Fort Hood, Texas; and Commander, Division Support Command, 1st Armored Division, United States Army Europe.

Wilson served at every level of command. He commanded three times at the company level; a maintenance company in the 82nd Airborne Division as a first lieutenant, followed by command of a supply and services company in South Vietnam with the 173rd Airborne Brigade, and B Company 123rd Maintenance Battalion with the 1st Armored Division in Europe. At the lieutenant colonel level, Wilson commanded the 709th Maintenance Battalion, 9th Infantry Division, Fort Lewis, which converted and became the army's first Main Support Battalion. Wilson commanded twice at the colonel level, serving as the DISCOM Commander of the 1st Armored Division followed by command of the 13th Support Command at Fort Hood, Texas.

Wilson next served as the Deputy Commanding General, 21st TAACOM, the army's largest and most diverse logistics unit. Based on his wide experience with leading soldiers, Wilson was selected to become the Chief of Ordnance of the United States Army and command the United States Army Ordnance Center and School responsible for the training and professional development of thousands of soldiers, NCOs, and officers every year. Following this successful assignment, Wilson served as the Chief of Staff, AMC, where he was responsible for resource and personnel management for a workforce with over 80,000 military and civilian members. From 1994 to 1996 served as the Deputy Chief of Staff for Logistics, Department of the Army, where he was responsible for worldwide logistics.

== Awards and decorations ==
Wilson's awards and decorations include:

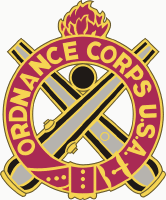

Master Parachutist Badge
Army Distinguished Service Medal with oak leaf cluster		Legion of Merit with oak leaf cluster
Bronze Star Medal with two oak leaf clusters	Meritorious Service Medalwith two oak leaf clusters	Army Commendation Medal
Army Good Conduct Medalwith bronze clasp with 2 loops	National Defense Service Medal with star	Vietnam Service Medal
Army Service Ribbon	Army Overseas Service with Award numeral "3"	Vietnam Campaign Medal
Meritorious Unit Award	Vietnam Gallantry Cross Unit Citation	Civil Actions Medal Unit Citation (Vietnam)
Ordnance Corps Regimental Insignia	United States Army Materiel Command shoulder Insignia	13th Armored Corps Sustainment CommandInsignia
Special Forces Tab

== Post military career ==
After retirement, Wilson became President and Chief Operating Officer of Dimensions International, Inc. He has also served on the board of the Truman Library Institute, after being nominated by Colin Powell, and serves on the Army Scholarship Foundation as a member of the Foundation's Honorary Advisory Committee.

Wilson is married to the former Helen McGhee of Elyria, Ohio. They have three children and seven grandchildren.

Wilson is a member of Alpha Phi Alpha fraternity. He is also a member of Sigma Pi Phi.

Wilson also served ten years on Morgan State Board of Regents, Washington First Bank Board of Directors. Other Honors: a school, a park, and a tower named in his honor in Lorain Ohio; honorary doctor of laws decree from Alabama A&M University, US Army Officer Candidate Distinguished Graduate, BEYA Lifetime Achievement.

In July 2022, he joined with other former U.S. military leaders in condemning former president and commander in chief, Donald Trump for his role in the storming of the U.S. Capitol on 6 January 2021.

== Personal ==
In the 2024 United States presidential election, Wilson endorsed Kamala Harris.

== Notes ==
Military offices
Preceded by James W. Ball	Chief of Ordnance of the United States Army; 1990–1992	Succeeded by John G. Coburn
