= Detroit Arsenal (Warren, Michigan) =

Former US Army tank manufacturing plant

Coordinates: 42°29′49″N 83°02′30″W

Detroit Army Arsenal
- Part of U.S. Army Tank-automotive and Armaments Command
- Warren, Michigan
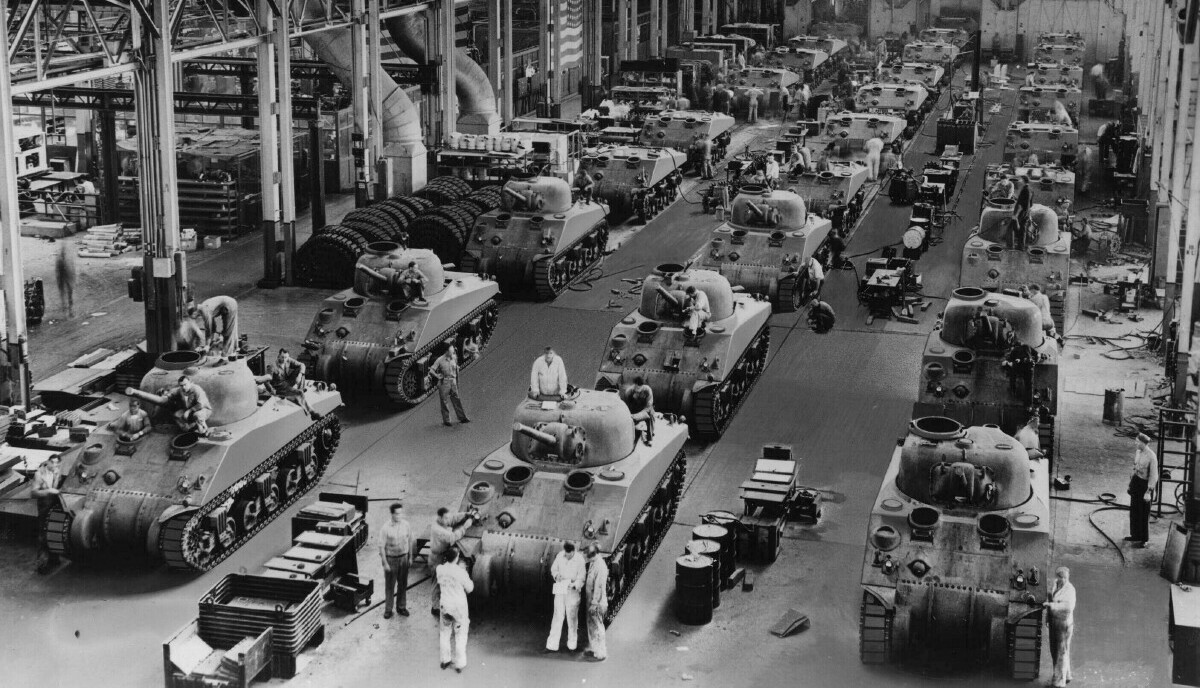
- The plant floor in 1942

Site information
- Type: TACOM: Research, Development and Engineering Center; Life Cycle Management Command
- Controlled by: US Army Installation Management Command

Garrison information
- Garrison: US Army Garrison - Detroit Army Arsenal

Detroit Arsenal (DTA), formerly Detroit Arsenal Tank Plant (DATP) was the first manufacturing plant ever built for the mass production of tanks in the United States. Established in 1940 under Chrysler, the plant was owned by the U.S. government until 1996. It was designed by architect Albert Kahn. The building was designed originally as a "dual production facility", so that it could make armaments and be turned into peaceful production at war's end. Notwithstanding its name, the 113-acre (0.46 km^{2}) site was located in Warren, Michigan, Detroit's most populous suburb.

== History ==
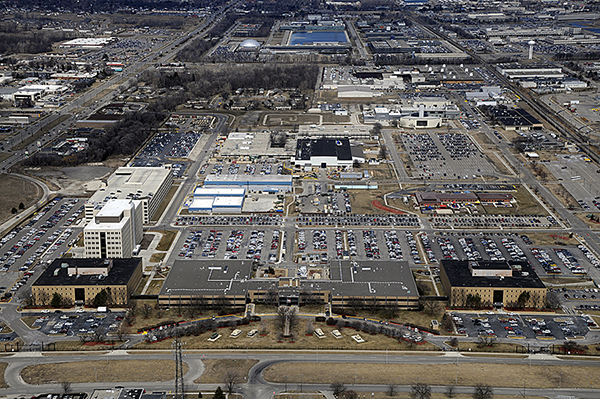
US Army Detroit Arsenal, 2013.

Chrysler's construction effort at the plant in 1941 was one of the fastest on record. The first tanks rumbled out of the plant before its complete construction.

During World War II, the Detroit Arsenal Tank Plant built a quarter of the 89,568 tanks produced in the U.S. overall. The plant made M3 Lee tanks while the buildings were still being raised and switched to M4 Sherman tanks in 1942. The Korean War boosted production for the first time since World War II had ended; the government would suspend tank production after each war. In May 1952, Chrysler resumed control from the army, which had been unable to ramp up production.

External image
- Aerial view of the site, 2006

As a government-owned, contractor operated (GOCO) facility, Chrysler retained operational control of the production facility until March 1982, when Chrysler sold its Chrysler Defense division to General Dynamics Land Systems. General Dynamics produced the M1 Abrams tank at the facility (and at another plant in Lima, Ohio) until 1996, when the plant was closed and tank assembly and maintenance operations were consolidated at the Lima plant. The plant and some of the adjoining property were transferred to the City of Warren in 2001. The site of the original tank plant has been parcelled up and is now dedicated to civilian uses.

This important production site of the Arsenal of Democracy is memorialized by a Michigan Historical Marker.

The structure of the plant was designed to survive bombardment by the weapons of the day. It included 3-foot-thick (0.91 m) concrete walls in some areas and a reinforced roof with slats to direct bombs away from vulnerable windows and exhaust fans.

The portion of the property not sold to the city remains an active Army facility with many agencies present. The installation is managed by Installation Management Command (IMCOM) and hosts the headquarters of the United States Army CCDC Ground Vehicle Systems Center (GVSC), formerly United States Army Tank Automotive Research, Development and Engineering Center (TARDEC), and it hosts the United States Army TACOM Life Cycle Management Command. TACOM continues to function at the location, and experienced a major building boom in the 2010s.

== Tenant units ==
- United States Army DEVCOM Ground Vehicle Systems Center
- United States Army TACOM Life Cycle Management Command TACOM LCMC
- U.S. Army Program Executive Office Combat Support & Combat Service Support (PEO CS&CSS)
- U.S. Army Program Executive Office Ground Combat Systems (PEO GCS)

== Tanks produced ==
- M3 Lee, 1941–1942
- M4 Sherman, 1941–1945
- M26 Pershing, 1945
- M46 Patton, 1949
- M47 Patton, 1951–1953
- M67 "Zippo", 1955–1956
- M60, 1960–1987
- M1 Abrams, 1980–1996
