= U.S. Army DEVCOM Ground Vehicle Systems Center =

Coordinates: 42°29′33.0″N 83°02′30.1″W

U.S. Army DEVCOM Ground Vehicle Systems Center Center
- Active: 1946 – present
- Country: United States
- Branch: U.S. Army
- Type: Research and Development
- Garrison/HQ: Detroit Arsenal, Michigan
- Website: Official Website

The United States Army DEVCOM Ground Vehicle Systems Center (GVSC) (formerly United States Army Tank Automotive Research, Development and Engineering Center (TARDEC)), located in Warren, Michigan, is the United States Armed Forces' research and development facility for advanced technology in ground systems. It is part of the U.S. Army Combat Capabilities Development Command (DEVCOM), a major subordinate command of the U.S. Army Transformation and Training Command. GVSC shares its facilities with the United States Army Tank-automotive and Armaments Command (TACOM). Current technology focus areas include Ground Vehicle Power and Mobility (GVPM), Ground System Survivability and Force Protection, among others.

== Laboratories ==
It features a number of research laboratories, including:

- Laser Protection Laboratory
- Crew Station Systems Integration Laboratory
- Robotic Systems Integration Laboratory
- Ground Vehicle Durability Test Laboratory — ride motion simulator, pintle motion-based simulator, crew station/turret motion based simulator and several vehicle and vehicle component "shaker" facilities
- High Performance Computing Laboratory — supports virtual prototyping and design development of combat vehicles and improves virtual reality capabilities
- Next Generation Software Laboratory
- Water Laboratory
- Petroleum Laboratory — researches properties and durability of a wide range of fuel including JP-8, Diesel, hydraulic fluids and lubricants
- Bridging Simulation Laboratory — Located at Selfridge Air National Guard base, this facility features computer-controlled load test areas with automated data acquisition capability for structural testing of bridging systems. Laboratory capabilities include static and dynamic structural load application for structural and fatigue testing.
- Propulsion Test Laboratory
- Physical and Rapid Prototyping Laboratory
- Advanced Materials and Manufacturing Center — researches a variety of alternative vehicle structural materials, including composite materials
- Center for Systems Integration (CSI)
- Advanced joining research facility (fusion & friction stir welding, adhesives and mechanical fasteners)
- Vehicle Protection Integration Laboratory (VPIL)
- Ground System Power and Energy Laboratory (GSPEL) (opened April 2012)
  - Power and Energy Vehicle Environment Laboratory (PEVEL)
  - Fuel Cell Research Laboratory
  - Energy Storage Laboratory
  - Air Filtration Laboratory
  - Electric Components Laboratory
  - Power Laboratory
  - Thermal Management Laboratory
  - Calorimeter Laboratory

Robotic Power and Energy Vehicle Environmental Laboratory (Opened 2021)

== Relationship with Industry ==
U.S. Army GVSC maintains collaborative partnerships with a spectrum of defense and automotive industry entities to co-develop key ground vehicle technologies while leveraging industry technology advancements and economy-of-scale. These relationships are formalized through various mechanisms, including formal contracts, Test Services Agreements, and Cooperative Research and Development Agreements. Mechanisms such as Patent License Agreements and Small Business Innovation Research allow GVSC to build bridges to commercial technology to accelerate the innovation timeline.

These collaborations frequently extend to academic institutions. A key academic partner is the University of Michigan, which leads the Automotive Research Center (ARC), a U.S. Army Center of Excellence for modeling and simulation of ground vehicles and Clemson University, through its Virtual Prototyping of Ground Systems (VIPR-GS) program. GVSC additionally employs a “quad” model with each academic collaboration, which includes a university researcher, government researcher/engineer, student(s), and an industry member.

== Robotic Vehicles ==
U.S. Army GVSC is the Department of Defense's lead agency for automated, driver-optional, and driver-assist technology development for ground vehicles. Developed within its Ground Vehicle Robotics portfolio, these technologies apply through the common, open-source Robotics Operating System-Military to tactical and combat vehicle platforms and applications.

=== Automated Convoy Testing on Interstate Highways ===
In 2016, and again in 2017, U.S. Army GVSC with the Michigan Department of Transportation conducted tests and demonstrations of its leader-follower technology on Interstate 69 and across the Blue Water Bridge in Eastern Michigan. The tests, intended to exercise the Dedicated Short Range Communications radios installed both in the vehicles and along the roadways, demonstrated the effectiveness of Vehicle-to-Vehicle (V2V) and Vehicle-to-Infrastructure (V2I) communications along the interstate. Further tests are expected in conjunction with the American Center for Mobility in Ypsilanti, Michigan.

== List of directors ==
No.	Director		Term		
No.	Portrait	Name	Took office	Left office	Duration
As U.S. Army Tank-Automotive Research, Development, and Engineering Center
1	Wayne Wheelock	Wayne Wheelock	Before 1994	After 1994	
1	Richard E. McClelland	Richard E. McClelland	2002	2006	~4 years, 0 days
2	Grace M. Bochenek	Grace M. Bochenek	August 2006	March 2012	~5 years, 213 days
3	Jennifer A. Hitchcock	Jennifer A. Hitchcock; Acting	March 2012	12 August 2012	~164 days
4	Paul D. Rogers	Paul D. Rogers	12 August 2012	22 October 2018	6 years, 82 days
5	Jeffrey L. Langhout	Jeffrey L. Langhout	22 October 2018	4 February 2019	105 days
As U.S. Army DEVCOM Ground Vehicle Systems Center
1	Jeffrey L. Langhout	Jeffrey L. Langhout	4 February 2019	17 January 2021	1 year, 348 days
2	Alfred J. Grein	Alfred J. Grein; Acting	17 January 2021	11 April 2021	84 days
3	Michael Cadieux	Michael Cadieux	11 April 2021	Incumbent	5 years, 107 days

== See also ==
- Humvee
- Intelligent Ground Vehicle Competition
- Lawrence Technological University
- List of U.S. military vehicles by model number
- Medium Mine Protected Vehicle
- MillenWorks Light Utility Vehicle
- Multi Autonomous Ground-robotic International Challenge
- Office of Naval Research
- Plug-in vehicle
- United States Army Combat Capabilities Development Command
