= John G. Coburn =

United States Army general

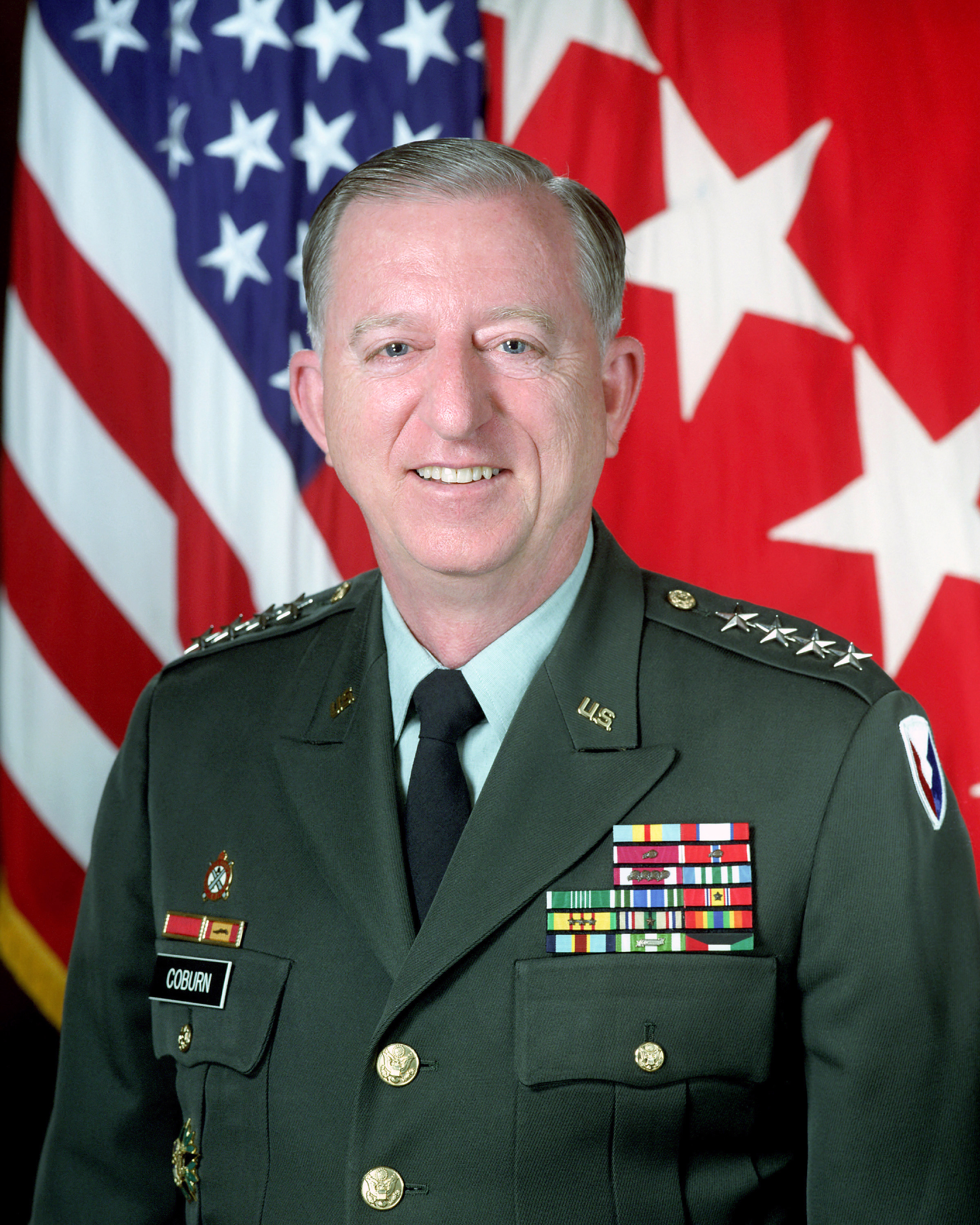
- General John G. Coburn
- Born: 9 October 1941 (age 85); Caretta, West Virginia, U.S.
- Military career
- Allegiance: United States
- Branch: United States Army
- Service years: 1963–2001
- Rank: General
- Commands: United States Army Materiel Command; Chief of Ordnance; 124th Maintenance Battalion
- Conflicts: Vietnam War; Gulf War
- Awards: Defense Distinguished Service Medal (2); Army Distinguished Service Medal; Legion of Merit (2); Bronze Star Medal (2)
- Other work: Chairman and CEO, VT Systems

General John Gordon Coburn (born 9 October 1941) is the former CEO of VT Systems, Inc. (VT Systems), a global company, which he joined in November 2001 and grew from 61 million dollars to 1.3 billion dollars. He relinquished this role in December 2018, and now serves as Non-Executive Chairman of the VT Systems Advisory Board. Prior to joining VT Systems, he served as the Commanding General, United States Army Materiel Command. He assumed the duties of Commanding General on 14 May 1999, and retired from the army in 2001. Prior to this assignment, he served as the Deputy Chief of Staff for Logistics, United States Army, Pentagon. He also served as the 26th Chief of Ordnance for the United States Army Ordnance Corps.

== Military career ==
Coburn is a distinguished military graduate of Eastern Michigan University, where he holds a Bachelor of Arts degree in education, and was commissioned as a second lieutenant into the infantry. He served in various logistics assignments throughout his career, to include Deputy Commanding General, Army Material Command and Commanding General, United States Army Ordnance Center and School. He was also the Deputy Chief of Staff for Logistics, United States Army Europe and Seventh Army, Germany, from 1991 to 1992. Prior to that, he served as the Deputy Commanding General, 22nd Theater Army Support Command in Saudi Arabia from April 1991 to July 1991, and as the Deputy Chief of Staff for Procurement, United States Army Materiel Command from 1989 to 1991.

Other major command assignments include Commander of Materiel Readiness Support Activity, Lexington, Kentucky, from 1987 to 1989; Commander, Division Support Command, 2nd Armored Division, Fort Hood, Texas, from 1984 to 1986; Commander, 124th Maintenance Battalion, 2nd Armored Division, Fort Hood, Texas, from 1980 to 1982; Commander, Defense Contract Administration Services Management Area, Defense Logistics Agency, South Bend, Indiana, from 1978 to 1980; and Plant/Depot Commander, Taiwan Materiel Agency, Army Material Command, Taiwan, from 1972 to 1973.

Coburn's staff assignments include: Assistant Chief of Staff, G-4 (Logistics), 2nd Armored Division, from 1982 to 1983; Executive Officer, Battlefield Systems Directorate, Headquarters, United States Army Materiel Command from 1977 to 1978; Procurement Officer, Procurement and Production Directorate, Headquarters, United States Army Materiel Command; Senior Advisor, Training and Personnel, United States Army Engineer District-Saudi Arabia, Riyadh, Saudi Arabia, from 1975 to 1977; Executive Officer, Defense Contract Administration Services Region, Defense Supply Agency, New York, New York from 1968 to 1971; Assistant G-3 (Operations), II Field Force, Vietnam, United States Army, Vietnam, from 1967 to 1968; and Special Weapons Platoon Leader, Savanna Army Depot, Illinois, from 1963 to 1964.

After returning from Taiwan, Coburn attended the United States Army Command and General Staff College, Fort Leavenworth, Kansas, and then the University of Kansas, where he earned a Master of Arts degree in political science. He is also a graduate of the Industrial College of the Armed Forces, Fort McNair, Washington, D.C. and has a Juris Doctor degree from the University of Missouri School of Law. He is licensed to practice law before the Supreme Court, State of Michigan; Supreme Court, State of Kentucky; District of Columbia Court of Appeals and the Supreme Court of the United States.

Coburn has extensive experience in the areas of logistics and contracting. Further, he has extensive experience in International relations and business, both international and domestic. He is also a noted author.

Coburn also serves as a member of the Board of Directors of International Management & Development Institute (IMDI), a non-profit educational institute that promotes business-government dialogue and cooperation covering international trade, finance, economic and foreign policy issues.

== Awards ==
Coburn's military decorations include the Defense Distinguished Service Medal with Oak Leaf Cluster, the Army Distinguished Service Medal, Legion of Merit with Oak Leaf Cluster, Bronze Star Medal with Oak Leaf Cluster, Meritorious Service Medal with four Oak Leaf Clusters, Joint Service Commendation Medal, Army Commendation Medal, the Southwest Asia Service Medal, and the Kuwait Liberation Medal (Kuwait).

== Personal ==
Coburn, a native of Kentucky, is married to the former Janice Pepper of Ypsilanti, Michigan; they have three sons, John, Robert and Matthew. Their daughter, Kayleen Ruth Coburn was born on 19 December 1965, and died the next day.

Military offices
| Preceded by Johnnie E. Wilson | Chief of Ordnance of the United States Army; 1992-1994 | Succeeded by James W. Monroe |
