= Lynn A. Collyar =

United States Army general

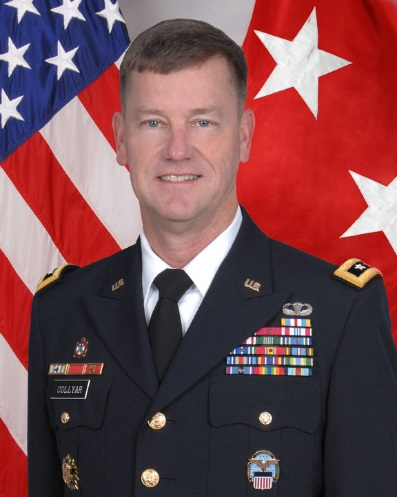
- Major General Lynn A. Collyar
- Military career
- Allegiance: United States of America
- Branch: United States Army
- Service years: 1979 - 2014
- Rank: Major General
- Commands: 35th Chief of Ordnance (2008 - 2010)

Major General Lynn A. Collyar is a retired general officer in the United States Army and served as the Commanding General, U.S. Army Aviation & Missile Command between from 2012 to 2014. Prior to this assignment, he served as the 35th Chief of Ordnance and Commandant of the U.S. Army Ordnance School at Aberdeen Proving Ground, Maryland and Fort Lee, Virginia.

== Military education ==
A native of Huntsville, Alabama, he was commissioned in the Ordnance Corps upon graduation from the United States Military Academy in 1979. His military schools include, Ordnance Officer Basic and Advanced Courses, the U.S. Army Command and General Staff College, and the Industrial College of the Armed Forces. He also holds a master's degree in National Resource Strategy from the National Defense University in Washington, D.C.

== Military career ==
Collyar was initially assigned to the 619th Ordnance Company, 72nd Ordnance Battalion, 59th Ordnance Brigade at Kriegsfeld, Germany. His positions included platoon leader, shop and tech supply officer, operations officer, and executive officer. In 1983, he was assigned as intelligence and operations officer with the 68th Transportation Battalion, 4th Infantry Division (Mechanized), followed by command of the 50th Ordnance Company (Special Ammo), Fort Carson, Colorado.

In October 1986, he returned to Europe to serve as division ammunition officer, Division Support Command support operations officer, and assistant division materiel management officer with the 8th Infantry Division (Mechanized) in Bad Kreuznach, Germany. Following Command and General Staff College at Fort Leavenworth, he was assigned to the Office of Resource Management for the Army's Deputy Chief of Staff for Logistics at the Pentagon.

In June 1993, he joined the 25th Infantry Division at Schofield Barracks, Hawaii, where he served as the 725th Main Support Battalion executive officer, Division G4 Plans and Operations Officer, and then Deputy Chief of Staff for Logistics. He served as the deputy logistics officer, Joint Task Force 180, during the Division's deployment to Haiti as part of Operation Uphold Democracy.

Collyar was reassigned to Fort Bragg, North Carolina, in July 1996. He served as executive officer and deputy commander of the 82nd Airborne Division Support Command. In July 1997, he assumed command of the 189th Corps Support Battalion, 1st Corps Support Command, XVIII Airborne Corps. During his tenure, the battalion deployed to Central America where he served as Joint Logistics Task Force Commander in support of Operation Strong Support. In July 1999, he returned to the Resource Management Office, Army Deputy Chief of Staff for Logistics, at the Pentagon. He spent the following year at the National Defense University attending the Industrial College of the Armed Forces. He returned to the Pentagon in June 2001 as Chief, Initiatives Group, Office of the Deputy Chief of Staff, G-8.

Collyar took command of the 29th Area Support Group, 21st Theater Support Command in July 2002. While in command, elements of the unit deployed to various locations throughout European and Central Command areas of operation in support of the Iraq War. In July 2004, he returned to the Pentagon as the Chief, Focused Logistics Division, Force Development, Office of the Deputy Chief of Staff G-8. In August 2006, he assumed command of the Defense Distribution Center in New Cumberland, Pennsylvania, a primary level field activity of the Defense Logistics Agency. While in command of the Defense Distribution Center from August 2006 to June 2008, his failure to correct problems in the supply system that had been identified in earlier audits led to the shipment of four electrical fuses for ballistic missile nuclear warheads to Taiwan. Although reprimanded, he was allowed to continue in his position.

Collyar became the 35th Chief of Ordnance and Commandant of the Ordnance Center and Schools at Aberdeen Proving Ground in 2008. During his tenure, he led the relocation and consolidation of the Ordnance Branch from Aberdeen Proving Ground, Maryland and Redstone Arsenal, Alabama to its new home at Fort Lee, Virginia. In 2009, he transferred the flag of the Chief of Ordnance to Fort Lee, Virginia.

In June 2010, he was assigned as the Director of Logistics Operations for the Defense Logistics Agency. On June 1, 2012, he assumed command of the U.S. Army Aviation & Missile Command at Redstone Arsenal, Alabama. He retired in September 2014.

== Awards and decorations ==
Basic Parachutist Badge
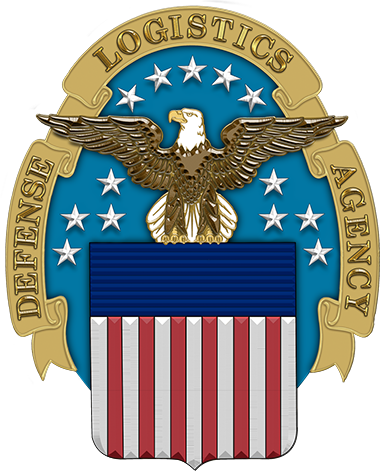
Defense Logistics Agency Badge
Army Staff Identification Badge
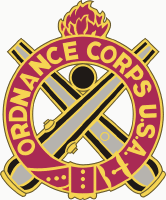
Army Ordnance Corps Distinctive Unit Insignia
? Overseas Service Bars

Army Distinguished Service Medal
Defense Superior Service Medal with one bronze oak leaf cluster
Legion of Merit with oak leaf cluster
Defense Meritorious Service Medal
Meritorious Service Medal with silver oak leaf cluster
Army Commendation Medal
Joint Service Achievement Medal
Army Achievement Medal with oak leaf cluster
Joint Meritorious Unit Award with oak leaf cluster
Meritorious Unit Commendation
Superior Unit Award with oak leaf cluster
National Defense Service Medal with one bronze service star
Armed Forces Expeditionary Medal
Global War on Terrorism Expeditionary Medal
Global War on Terrorism Service Medal
Armed Forces Service Medal
Humanitarian Service Medal with two service stars
Army Service Ribbon
Army Overseas Service Ribbon with bronze award numeral ?
Unidentified award
Unidentified award

Military offices
Preceded by Brigadier General Rebecca S. Halstead	Chief of Ordnance of the United States Army; 2008 - 2010	Succeeded by Brigadier General Clark W. LeMasters Jr.
