= Clark W. LeMasters Jr. =

United States Army general

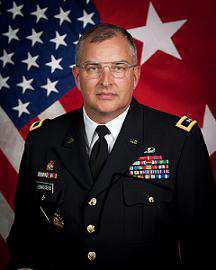
- Major General Clark W. LeMasters Jr.
- Military career
- Allegiance: United States of America
- Branch: United States Army
- Service years: 1982 – 2018
- Rank: Major General
- Commands: 36th Chief of Ordnance (2010-2012); Commanding General, U.S. Army Tank-automotive and Armaments Command (TACOM)

Major General Clark W. LeMasters Jr. is a serving general officer in the United States Army and serves as the 35th Commanding General of the U.S. Army Tank-automotive and Armaments Command Life Cycle Management Command. Previously, he served as the 36th Chief of Ordnance for the U.S. Army and Commandant of the United States Army Ordnance School at Fort Lee, Virginia.

== Military education ==
LeMasters was commissioned as a second lieutenant in 1982 from the ROTC program at Marion Military Institute in Marion, Alabama. Following his graduation from Marion, he served in the 1st Regiment, 115th Infantry Battalion, Maryland Army National Guard until he completed his bachelor's degree in chemistry at Frostburg State University, Frostburg, Maryland. He was assessed to active duty in September 1984 as an Ordnance Officer.

LeMasters has earned a master's degree from the Florida Institute of Technology and the Army War College. His military education includes the Ordnance Officer Basic and Advanced Courses, the Army Command and General Staff College, and the Army War College.

== Military career ==
LeMasters began his career in a series of junior officer assignments in 1985; including, Maintenance Control Officer for the Main Support Battalion for the 1st Infantry Division at Fort Riley, Kansas, Materiel Management Officer for the U.S. Army Missile Command at Redstone Arsenal, Alabama, and Maintenance Manager for Division Support Command for the 8th Infantry Division (Mechanized) in Germany. These junior officer assignments culminated with his assignment as the commander of Delta Company for the 123rd Main Support Battalion (Mechanized) for the 1st Armored Division stationed in Germany in 1991.

After serving as a staff officer with the 47th Support Battalion, 1st Armored Division, LeMasters was assigned as a Logistics Staff Officer for the Force Development and Evaluation Directorate at the U.S. Army Combined Arms Support Command at Fort Lee, Virginia in 1995. Following this assignment, he served as the Support Operations Officer for the 703rd Main Support Battalion and Executive Officer for the 1st Armored Division Support Command in Germany. In 2002, he assumed command of the 123rd Main Support Battalion (Mechanized) for the 1st Armored Division.

Following battalion command, LeMasters was assigned as the Chief of the Logistics Readiness Center at U.S. Central Command and then, Director, Distribution Management Center for the U.S. Army Sustainment Command at Rock Island Arsenal, Illinois. In 2009, he was selected as the Executive Officer to the Deputy Chief of Staff, G-4, of the U.S. Army.

In 2010, LeMasters was selected to become the 36th Chief of Ordnance and Commandant of the U.S. Army Ordnance School. During this assignment, he was promoted to Brigadier General.

Following his tour as Chief of Ordnance, LeMasters was selected to command the 13th Sustainment Command (Expeditionary) based at Fort Hood, Texas in 2012. During this assignment, he was promoted to Major General.

After LeMasters' two-year tour as the Deputy Chief of Staff for Logistics and Operations for the U.S. Army Materiel Command at Redstone Arsenal, Alabama, LeMasters assumed command of the U.S. Army Tank-automotive and Armaments Command in 2016.

LeMasters has served multiple tours with both Operation Enduring Freedom and Operation Iraqi Freedom.

== Awards and decorations ==
Basic Parachutist Badge
Army Staff Identification Badge
1st Armored Division Combat Service Identification Badge
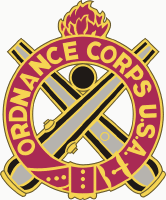
Army Ordnance Corps Distinctive Unit Insignia
3 Overseas Service Bars

Army Distinguished Service Medal with one bronze oak leaf cluster
Legion of Merit with three oak leaf clusters
Bronze Star Medal with oak leaf cluster
Defense Meritorious Service Medal
Meritorious Service Medal with four oak leaf clusters
Army Commendation Medal
Army Achievement Medal with two oak leaf clusters
Joint Meritorious Unit Award
Valorous Unit Award
National Defense Service Medal with one bronze service star
Afghanistan Campaign Medal with service star
Iraq Campaign Medal with service star
Global War on Terrorism Expeditionary Medal
Global War on Terrorism Service Medal
Army Service Ribbon
Army Overseas Service Ribbon with bronze award numeral 3
NATO Medal for service with ISAF

Military offices
| Preceded by Major General Lynn A. Collyar | Chief of Ordnance of the United States Army; 2010 - 2012 | Succeeded by Lieutenant General Edward M. Daly |
