= James W. Ball =

United States Army general

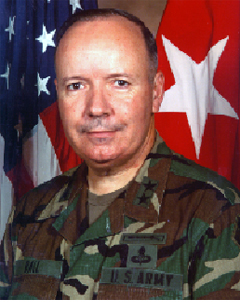
- Major General James W. Ball
- Born: James William Ball; February 10, 1939 (age 87); Columbia, Mississippi, U.S.
- Military career
- Allegiance: United States
- Branch: United States Army
- Service years: 1960–1993
- Rank: Major General
- Commands: Chief of Ordnance; 782nd Maintenance Battalion, 82nd Airborne Division
- Conflicts: Vietnam War
- Awards: Distinguished Service Medal; Legion of Merit (2); Meritorious Service Medal (4)

Major General James William Ball (born February 10, 1939) was a career officer in the United States Army who served as the 24th Chief of Ordnance for the United States Army Ordnance Corps.

== Early life ==
Ball was born in Columbia, Mississippi, on February 10, 1939. He completed high school in 1956 and attended Mississippi State University for his undergraduate and Florida Institute of Technology for his graduate degree. He was a member of the fraternity Kappa Alpha Order and a member of Scabard and Blade. An industrial management major and a member of ROTC, he graduated in 1960 with a B.S. degree as a Distinguished Military Graduate.

== Military career ==
Ball completed the Infantry Officer School Basic Course and was a Platoon Leader and Assistant S4 with the 2nd Airborne Battle Group, 187th Infantry, 101st Airborne Division Fort Campbell, Kentucky. After transferring to the Ordnance Corps, he served as the Project Officer and the Executive Officer with the Procurement and Product Directorate, United States Army Missile Command at Redstone Arsenal, Alabama. Following a tour in France, Ball spent six months as the S-4 for the 62nd Maintenance Battalion in South Vietnam before completing a year as Commander of the 149th Maintenance Company of the 62nd Maintenance Battalion. In 1968, he completed the Ordnance Advanced Course at Aberdeen Proving Ground, Maryland, and, following an assignment with the Defense Contract Administration Services District in Atlanta, he attended the Command and General Staff College course at Fort Leavenworth, Kansas, in 1970. For the next three years, he served as the Logistics Staff Officer for the Deputy Chief of Logistics, United States Army Europe and, then, as a student at the United States Army Logistics Management Center at Fort Lee, Virginia. While at Fort Lee, Ball completed a Master of Science degree in Contract and Procurement Management from the Florida Institute of Technology in 1974.

As a lieutenant colonel, Ball served for nearly a year as a Logistics Staff Officer with the Defense Attache Office in Saigon, Vietnam, and was one of the last American officers to leave Saigon before the North Vietnamese entered the city on April 30, 1975. Following tours as Commander of the 782nd Maintenance Battalion, 82nd Airborne Division and, later, as Commander of the Division Material Management Center, 82nd Airborne Division at Fort Bragg, North Carolina, Ball attended the Industrial College of the Armed Forces in Washington, D.C. Next, he served as Chief of the Procurement Programs and Budget Division, Materiel Plans and Programs Directorate, Office of the Deputy Chief of Staff for Research, Development, and Acquisition at Pentagon, Ball spent four years in Europe as Commander of the 3rd Armored Division Support Command, 3rd Armored Division, and later as Deputy Commander, 2nd Corps Support Command, VII Corps.

In 1983, Ball began an assignment as Project Manager for Training Devices with the Office of the Deputy Commanding General for Research, Development and Acquisition, United States Army Materiel Command, in Orlando, Florida. In July 1986, he was selected for promotion to brigadier general and was assigned as the Program Executive Officer, Combat Support Systems, United States Army Tank-Automotive Command in Warren, Michigan.

Ball became the 24th Chief of Ordnance and Commandant of the Ordnance Center and School in August 1988. During his tenure, the Non-Commissioned Officer Academy was re-certified and the Ordnance Museum was readied for re-certification after an effort of several years. With consistent effort by the entire staff, the caliber of the Reserve Officer Training Corps (ROTC) graduates attending the Ordnance School underwent substantial improvement. Ball concentrated on improving the second half of the Warrant Officer Basic Course offered at the Ordnance School, which students attended after they completed the first half at Fort Rucker, Alabama.

Following his assignment as Chief of Ordnance, Ball served as Director for Supplies and Maintenance, Office of the Deputy Chief of Staff for Logistics, United States Army. He retired in 1993.

Military offices
Preceded by Leon E. Salomon	Chief of Ordnance of the United States Army; 1988–1990	Succeeded by Johnnie E. Wilson
