= Leon E. Salomon =

United States Army general

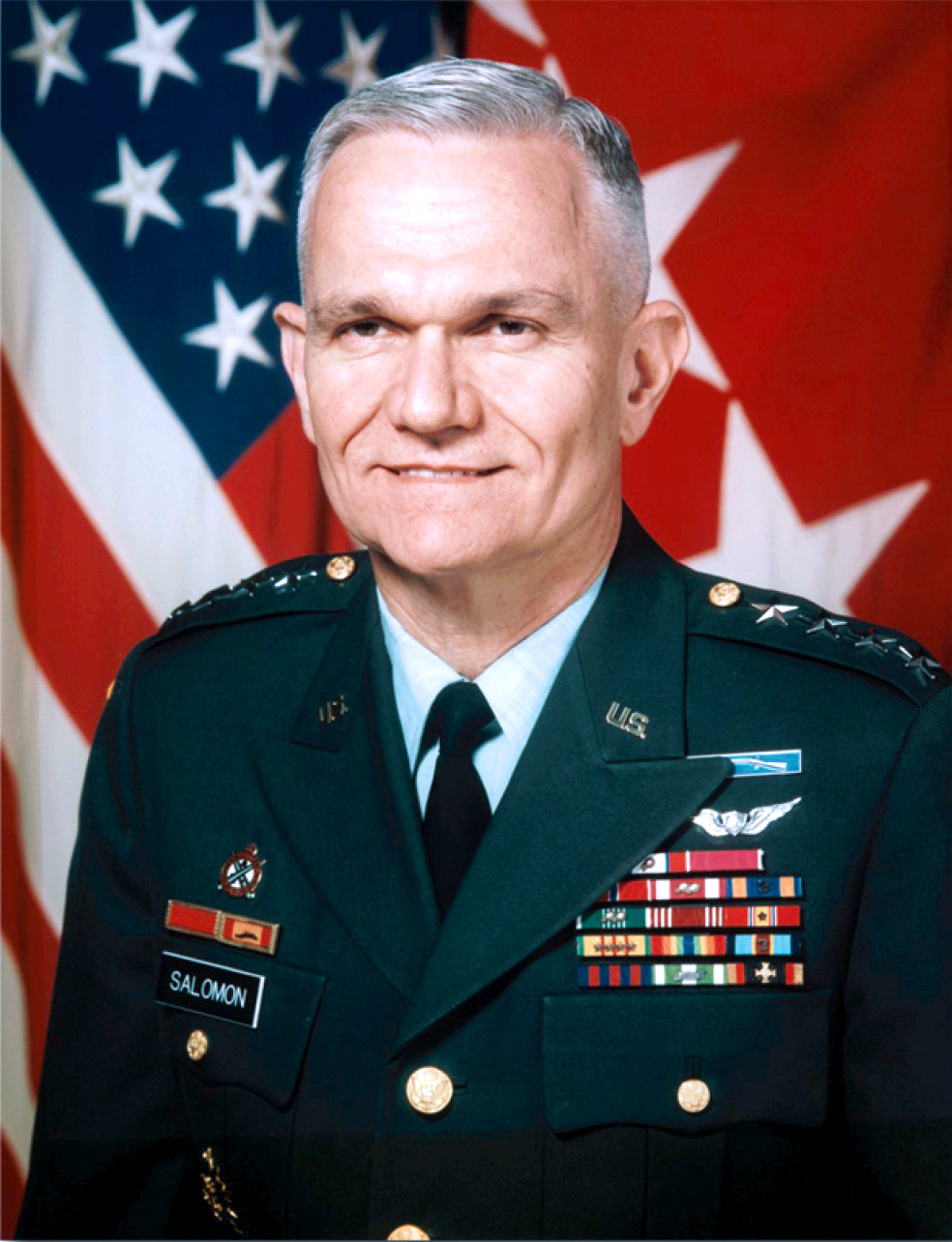
- General Leon E. Salomon
- Born: 27 April 1936; Chicago, Illinois, U.S.
- Died: 14 July 2023 (aged 87)
- Military career
- Allegiance: United States
- Branch: United States Army
- Service years: 1958–1996
- Rank: General
- Commands: United States Army Materiel Command; United States Army Combined Arms Support Command; Chief of Ordnance; 21st Support Command; 19th Maintenance Battalion
- Conflicts: Vietnam War
- Awards: Army Distinguished Service Medal (2); Legion of Merit; Bronze Star Medal; Air Medal (3)
- Other work: Board of directors, GRC International; Vice president, Rubbermaid; Board of directors, ATC Materials, Inc.

General Leon Edward Salomon (27 April 1936 – 14 July 2023) was a United States Army general who served as Chief of Ordnance of the United States Army from 1986 to 1988.

== Early life and education ==
Salomon was born in Chicago, Illinois, on 27 April 1936 and was drafted into the Army on 18 June 1958. On completion of Infantry Officer Candidate School, he was commissioned a second lieutenant on 24 June 1959. Salomon has Bachelor of Science degree in chemistry and biology from the University of Florida in 1958 and a Master of Science degree in logistics management from the United States Air Force Institute of Technology in 1971. His military education includes the Chemical Officer Advanced Course, the United States Army Command and General Staff College, and the Industrial College of the Armed Forces.

== Military career ==
Following three years as an infantry officer, Salomon transferred to the Chemical Corps in 1962. Following assignments as a Chemical School instructor and responsibility for an inventory control point in Orléans, France, he became involved in his first assignment with leveraging technology as Chief of the Automated Logistics Tests for the Division Logistics Systems at Fort Hood, Texas. After graduation from the Command and General Staff College (1969), a tour in Vietnam (1969–70), and graduate studies in logistics management at the Air Force Institute of Technology, he was again put to work developing automation systems to support logistics.

In 1974, Salomon transferred to the Ordnance Corps and became Commander of the 19th Maintenance Battalion, 3rd Support Command, in Giessen, Germany. He later became Assistant Chief of Staff for Logistics for the 3d Armored Division, in Frankfurt.

Following graduation from the Industrial College of the Armed Forces in 1978, Salomon was assigned to the Office of the Army Chief of Staff as the Chief of the Commercial Industrial Type Activity Team. In 1980, he became the Director of Combat Services Support Systems. He became involved in the drafting of the new proponency regulation that resulted in the recreation of the branch chief concept for Combat Service Support Branches. The end result was the re-establishment of the position of Chief of Ordnance and the rebirth of the Ordnance Corps under the Army Regimental Concept.

Salomon next went on to command the Division Support Command for the 1st Cavalry Division at Fort Hood, Texas. Following his tour there, he became the Deputy Commanding General, 21st Support Command, United States Army Europe and Seventh Army in Kaiserslautern, Germany.

Following his promotion to brigadier general in 1986, Salomon was named the 23rd Chief of Ordnance and Commandant of the United States Army Ordnance Center and School at Aberdeen Proving Ground. During his two-year tenure, he worked to improve the training, doctrine and evaluation programs at the Ordnance School. He encouraged faculty and staff to take a teacher-mentor-counselor approach in the training process, to stress proficiency at all levels, and to place more emphasis on "hands-on" activity in the training process. He stressed improvements in competence for all officers, warrant officers and enlisted personnel, and improved the quality and extent of career development guidance.

Salomon's next key assignments included Deputy Chief of Staff, United States Army Materiel Command (1988–89), Deputy Commanding General for Logistics U.S. Army Training and Doctrine Command, Fort Monroe, Virginia, Deputy Commanding General for Combined Arms Support, United States Army Training and Doctrine Command and Commanding General, United States Army Combined Arms Support Command and Fort Lee, Fort Lee, Virginia, and Deputy Chief of Staff for Logistics, Department of the Army. His career culminated as Commanding General, United States Army Materiel Command, from 11 February 1994 to 27 March 1996. He died on 14 July 2023, at the age of 87.

== Awards and decorations ==
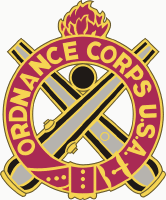
Expert Infantryman Badge
Basic Army Aviation Badge
Army Staff Identification Badge
Army Ordnance Corps Distinctive Unit Insignia
? Overseas Service Bars

Army Distinguished Service Medal with one bronze oak leaf cluster
Legion of Merit
Bronze Star Medal
Meritorious Service Medal with two oak leaf clusters
Air Medal with bronze award numeral 3
Army Commendation Medal with two oak leaf clusters
Army Meritorious Unit Commendation
Army Good Conduct Medal
National Defense Service Medal with one bronze service star
Vietnam Service Medal with four service stars
Army Service Ribbon
Army Overseas Service Ribbon with award numeral 3
Vietnam Hazardous Service Medal
Vietnam Armed Forces Honor Medal, 1st class
Badge of Honour of the Bundeswehr in gold (Germany)
Republic of Vietnam Gallantry Cross Unit Citation
Vietnam Campaign Medal

- Salomon is the 1ST recipient of the United States Army Ordnance Order of Samuel Sharpe. Salomon retired from the army in 1996.

== Later life ==
Since retiring, Salomon was elected to the GRC International Board of Directors. He also worked as a logistics consultant and is affiliated with Gary A. Dunbar, Inc. From 1996 to 1998, he was vice president for procurement and logistics for Rubbermaid and senior vice president for procurement at Rubbermaid from 1998 to 1999. He was on the board of directors for Global Security Management, ATC Materials, Inc. and Eagle Systems and Services, Inc, a wholly owned subsidiary of The Columbia Group.

Salomon lived in Gulfport, Florida, with his wife Shirley, two sons Greg and Jeff Salomon, and daughter Kristen Salomon.

=== Reprimand and Exoneration ===
In 2019, Salomon received a formal letter of reprimand from the Army that was later found to be unsubstantiated and removed from his file with complete exoneration for a charge of alleged indecent assault, in which he allegedly groped the spouse of the late BG William R. Holmes, GEN Salomon's direct subordinate. GEN Salomon, at the same cocktail party then allegedly further sought out a stranger, Ms. Vance's identical twin sister, Grace R. Vance, introduced himself and then allegedly made indecent sexual comments about her and her sister. This allegedly occurred at a pre-AUSA annual convention social at the General’s home at Ft Belvoir, VA October 1994. The Army determined that they would not seek any further disciplinary action.

On 10 February 2024, three members of an Army board charged with correcting military records unanimously approved the request to remove the reprimand in part because "there was insufficient probable cause that supported the allegations."

== Notes ==
Military offices
Preceded by William Estel Potts	Chief of Ordnance of the United States Army; 1986–1988	Succeeded by James W. Ball
