= Dennis K. Jackson =

United States Army general

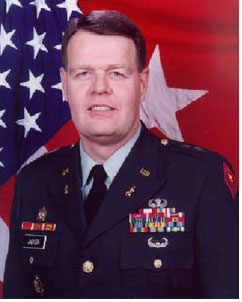
- Major General Dennis K. Jackson
- Born: November 16, 1946 (age 79); Cheyenne, Wyoming, U.S.
- Military career
- Allegiance: United States of America
- Branch: United States Army
- Service years: 1968–2004
- Rank: Major general
- Commands: 30th Chief of Ordnance (1998–2000)

Major General Dennis K. Jackson (born November 16, 1946) is a retired general officer in the United States Army and served as the director for logistics, J-4, United States Central Command, MacDill Air Force Base, Florida. Prior to this assignment, he served as the 30th Chief of Ordnance and Commandant of the U.S. Army Ordnance School at Aberdeen Proving Grounds, Maryland.

== Military education ==
Born in Cheyenne, Wyoming, in 1946, Jackson graduated from the University of Wyoming in 1968 with a Regular Army commission through the Reserve Officer Training Corps (ROTC). He also holds a Master of Business Administration from the Florida Institute of Technology. His military education includes the Armor Officer Basic Course, the Ordnance Officer Advanced Course, the U.S. Army Command and General Staff College, and the Industrial College of the Armed Forces.

== Military career ==
Detailed to the Armor Branch, he served in the 1st Armored Division in Germany from 1969 to 1971, including a short assignment as company commander of 'C' Company, 1st Battalion, 37th Armored Regiment. Taking up logistics duties, he next served in South Vietnam as supply officer then detachment support officer for the 571st Military Intelligence Detachment, 525th Military Intelligence Group.

Returning to the United States in 1973, Jackson served as executive officer then commander of Headquarters Company, Staff and Faculty Battalion, School Brigade, at the Ordnance Center and School at Aberdeen Proving Ground (APG), Maryland. Following completion of the Ordnance Officer Advanced course, his next assignment, from 1975 to 1978, was with the 4th Support Center, 13th Corps Support Command at Fort Hood, Texas. From 1978 to 1980, he served as a Maintenance Research Analyst at the United States Army Logistics Center, Fort Lee, Virginia. Another tour of duty in Germany followed with the 800th Materiel Management Center and then as executive officer of the 1st Maintenance Battalion, U.S. Army Europe.

In 1983 Jackson returned to the United States to attend the Command and General Staff College at Fort Leavenworth, Kansas, followed by duty with the United States Army Personnel Center at Alexandria, Virginia, from 1984 to 1987. Now thoroughly grounded in all aspects of logistics, he progressed through a series of increasingly demanding assignments. He commanded the 707th Maintenance Battalion, 7th Infantry Division, Fort Ord, California, from 1987 to 1989 and then served as assistant chief of staff, G-4 (Logistics) for the 7th Infantry Division, deploying with the division to Panama for Operation Just Cause. Following attendance at the Industrial College of the Armed Forces, he served as special assistant to the Army Chief of Staff from 1991 to 1992, and next took command of the Division Support Command, 25th Infantry Division at Schofield Barracks, Hawaii, in 1992.

From 1994 to 1995, Jackson served as the executive officer to the commanding general, United States Army Materiel Command, Alexandria, Virginia, and then returned to Hawaii to serve as director for logistics, engineering and security assistance, J-4, United States Pacific Command. From 1997 to 1998 he served as commanding general, 19th Theater Army Area Command in Korea. He returned to the United States in 1998 to serve as the 30th Chief of Ordnance and commanding general of the Ordnance Center and School at Aberdeen Proving Ground, Maryland. As the chief of ordnance, Jackson initiated a series of military occupational specialty (MOS) restructurings, starting with Bradley Fighting Vehicle and M-1 Abrams tank mechanics, which produced Multicapable Maintainers to support Army Transformation and Modularity. As head of the Velocity Management Repair Process Improvement Team, he reduced repair cycle times in some cases by 50 percent. He also promoted development of the Equipment Downtime Analyzer, a valuable diagnostic tool for field maintenance.

Jackson's final assignment followed, from 2000 to 2003, as director for logistics, J-4, United States Central Command (CENTCOM), where he was instrumental in focusing logistics support for Operation Enduring Freedom in Afghanistan while simultaneously building up the logistics infrastructure in preparation for the invasion of Iraq. As CENTCOM J-4, he managed $8 billion in support of more than 390,000 military personnel. Major General Jackson retired on January 1, 2004, after more than 35 years of service.

== Awards and decorations ==
Jackson's awards and decorations include the Defense Distinguished Service Medal, the Distinguished Service Medal, Defense Superior Service Medal, Legion of Merit (with 3 oak leaf clusters), Bronze Star Medal, the Meritorious Service Medal (with 3 oak leaf clusters), the Army Commendation Medal (with 2 oak leaf clusters), the Army Achievement Medal (with oak leaf cluster), the Parachutist Badge, and the Air Assault Badge.

Military offices
Preceded by Brigadier General Thomas R. Dickinson	Chief of Ordnance of the United States Army; 1998–2000	Succeeded by Lieutenant General Mitchell H. Stevenson
