= Robert D. Shadley =

United States Army general

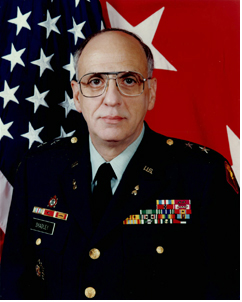
- Major General Robert D. Shadley
- Born: August 5, 1942 (age 84); Ohio, U.S.
- Military career
- Allegiance: United States
- Branch: United States Army
- Service years: 1965–2000
- Rank: Major general
- Commands: 28th Chief of Ordnance (1995–1997)

Robert David Shadley (born August 5, 1942) is a retired general officer in the United States Army and served as the Director of Logistics, G-4, for the United States Army Forces Command at Fort McPherson, Georgia. Prior to this assignment, he served as the 28th Chief of Ordnance and Commandant of the U.S. Army Ordnance School at Aberdeen Proving Grounds, Maryland.

== Early life and education ==
Shadley attended Circleville High School in Circleville, Ohio, graduating in 1960. He graduated from Purdue University with a bachelor's degree and a master's degree in Industrial Engineering. Shadley was commissioned in the Ordnance Corps through the school's Reserve Officer Training Corps (ROTC) program in 1965. His military education includes the Ordnance Officer Basic Course, the Ordnance Officer Advanced Course, the U.S. Army Command and General Staff College where he earned his Master of Military Arts and Sciences (MMAS), and the United States Army War College.

== Career ==
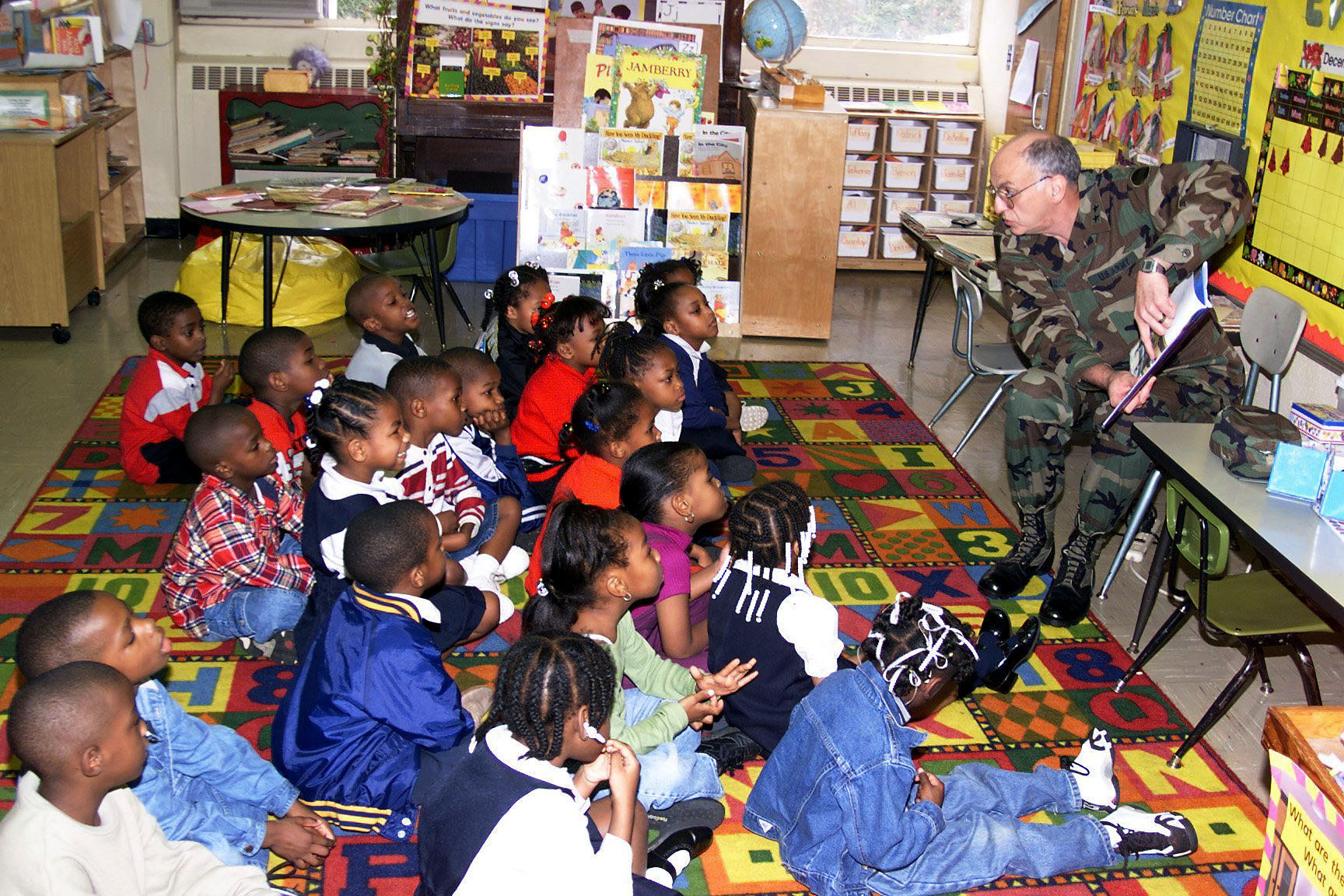
Shadley in 1998

Shadley began his career at Redstone Arsenal, Alabama, in a series of assignments, including service as the Training Officer and Commander of the 249th Ordnance Detachment, Unit Training Command, U.S. Army Missile and Munitions Center and School. He traveled overseas to serve as the Commander of the 86th Ordnance Detachment, United States Army Pacific in Japan and as advisor on the Ordnance Advisory Division, J-4, U.S. Military Assistance Command, Vietnam. In 1972, he returned to the U.S. and attended the Ordnance Officer Advanced Course. Next, he was assigned as a Research and Developments Coordinator in the Test and Evaluation Division, and later as the Chief of the Administration and Industrial Liaison Office with the United States Army Materiel Command in Alexandria, Virginia. In 1976, he traveled to England to be a student at the Long Armor Infantry Course at the British Royal Armor School. He returned to Fort Leavenworth, Kansas for an assignment as an Operations Research and Systems Analysis Officer in the Plans Division of the U.S. Army Combined Arms Center.

After completing the U.S. Army Command and General Staff course, he held a series of assignments with III Corps at Fort Hood, Texas, culminating in his assignment as the Assistant Chief of Staff, G-4 (Logistics). Following his assignment as Materiel Officer for the 124th Maintenance Battalion, 2nd Armored Division at Fort Hood, and Commander of the Division Materiel Management Center, 8th Infantry Division (Mechanized) for United States Army Europe in Germany, in 1983, he assumed command of the 801st Maintenance Battalion, 101st Airborne Division (Air Assault), Fort Campbell, Kentucky. After attendance at the U.S. Army War College and the Defense Systems Management College, he served in a series of assignments in the Office of the Deputy Chief of Staff for Logistics for the U.S. Army, which culminated as his selection as a Special Assistant to the Deputy Chief of Staff for Logistics.

In 1990, Shadley assumed command of the Division Support Command for the 1st Infantry Division (Mechanized) at Fort Riley, Kansas, where he deployed for Operations Desert Shield and Desert Storm. His Division Support Command supported 22,000 personnel as the 1st Infantry Division maneuvered and fought over 250 kilometers in four days. Next, he served from 1992 to 1994 as the Executive Officer to the Commanding General, U.S. Army Materiel Command, Alexandria, Virginia. Following this assignment, he was assigned to be the Director of Logistics, J-4 for the U.S. Atlantic Command, Norfolk, Virginia.

In 1995, Shadley was selected to be the 28th Chief of Ordnance and Commanding General of the Ordnance Center and School at Aberdeen Proving Ground, Maryland. Under his direction, the Ordnance Corps designed a new Explosive Ordnance Disposal (EOD) organization; made significant advances in EOD technology, and established Military Occupational Specialty (MOS) 35J, Computer Repairman. During his tenure, Aberdeen Proving Ground experienced a wide-ranging sex scandal among drill sergeants and female recruits, which surfaced in 1997.

Shadley culminated his career as Deputy Chief of Staff for Logistics, U.S. Army Forces Command (FORSCOM) in 1997. In this assignment, he was responsible for all of the logistical support for the Army's largest major command, an organization of more than 800,000 active and reserve soldiers and 40,000 civilians.

Shadley retired in 2000 after 35 years of service to the Army.

== Awards and decorations ==
Shadley's awards and decorations include the Distinguished Service Medal, Defense Superior Service Medal, Legion of Merit (with 2 oak leaf clusters), Bronze Star Medal (with oak leaf cluster), the Meritorious Service Medal (with 4 oak leaf clusters), the Army Commendation Medal, and the Army Achievement Medal.

In 2012, Shadley was elected to the Circleville High School Achievement Hall of Fame by the alumni association of his alma mater.

== Personal ==
Shadley married Cheryl Eileen Anderson on January 30, 1965 in Lafayette, Indiana. The couple had two children, but were divorced on May 3, 1977.

Military offices
Preceded by Major General James W. Monroe	Chief of Ordnance of the United States Army; 1995–1997	Succeeded by Brigadier General Thomas R. Dickinson
