= William M. Lenaers =

United States Army general

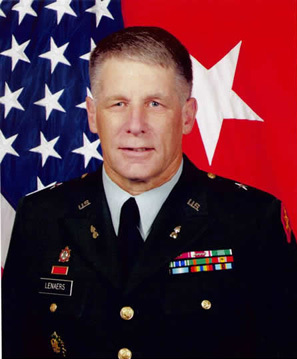
- Brigadier General William M. Lenaers
- Military career
- Allegiance: United States of America
- Branch: United States Army
- Service years: 1971 - 2008
- Rank: Major General
- Commands: 32nd Chief of Ordnance (2003 - 2004)

Major General William M. Lenaers is a retired general officer in the United States Army and served as Commanding General, U.S. Army Tank-automotive and Armaments Command in Warren, Michigan from 2004 to 2008. Prior to this assignment, he served as the 32nd Chief of Ordnance and Commandant of the U.S. Army Ordnance School at Aberdeen Proving Grounds, Maryland.

== Military education ==
Lenaers graduated from the University of Santa Clara with a Bachelor of Science degree in Chemistry and became a Second Lieutenant through the school's Reserve Officer Training Corps program in 1971. He also holds a Master of Science Degree in Oceanography and Hydrology from Oregon State University. His military education includes the Chemical Officer Basic Course, Ordnance Officer Advanced Course, the Command and General Staff College, and the Army War College.

== Military career ==
Lenaers began his career with the 85th Maintenance Battalion in Hanau, Germany. Next, he served as the Aide-de-Camp to the Commander of the 3d Support Command (Corps) in Frankfurt, Germany. In 1976, Lenaers was assigned to the Naval Support Force for the U.S. Antarctic Research Program at McMurdo Station, Antarctica. He served for over two years in support of research in this challenging environment.

Lenaers reported to Fort Hood, Texas, for assignment as the Armament Maintenance Officer with the 4th Support Center, Armor Support Battalion, followed by his tour as a Company Commander of the 190th Maintenance Company. Following his command tour, he reported to the United States Military Academy at West Point as an instructor in 1981. Following attendance at the U.S. Army Command and General Staff College in Fort Leavenworth, Kansas, he returned to Germany to serve with the 21st Support Command in Kaiserslautern. Then, he returned to the U.S. to serve as a Logistics Staff Officer with the Deputy Chief of Staff for Logistics, at Headquarters, Department of the Army in Washington, D.C.

Lenaers' battalion command tour was as the Commander of the 707th Main Support Battalion, Fort Ord, California. Following another tour as a Logistics Staff Officer with the Deputy Chief of Staff for Logistics and as a student at the Army War College, he assumed command of the Division Support Command for the 1st Infantry Division at Fort Riley, Kansas. After a tour as the Executive Officer for the Deputy Chief of Staff for Logistics, he was assigned to be the Deputy Chief of Staff for Ammunition, for the U.S. Army Materiel Command.

In November 1999, Lenaers began a series of Commanding General assignments. First, he served as the Commander of the U.S. Army Armament Research, Development and Engineering Center at Picatinny Arsenal in Dover, New Jersey. Next, he assumed command of the 13th Corps Support Command at Fort Hood, Texas. During his tenure several subordinate units were deployed in support of the Iraq War. Just prior to his departure the command's headquarters and remaining units were alerted for deployment to Iraq.

In August 2003, Lenaers became the 32nd Chief of Ordnance and Commandant of the U.S. Army Ordnance Center & School at Aberdeen Proving Ground. He assumed command at a critical time in both the Army's and the Ordnance Corps' history. Both were involved in two major wars and undergoing a transformation simultaneously.

Lenaers' final assignment was as the Commanding General of the United States Army Tank-automotive and Armaments Command in Warren, Michigan. He retired from the Army in September 2008 after 37 years of service.

== Awards and decorations ==
Lenears' awards and decorations include the Distinguished Service Medal (with oak leaf cluster), Legion of Merit (with 3 oak leaf clusters), the Meritorious Service Medal (with four oak leaf clusters), the Army Commendation Medal, the Army Achievement Medal, and the Navy Achievement Medal.

Military offices
Preceded by Major General Mitchell H. Stevenson	Chief of Ordnance of the United States Army; 2003 - 2004	Succeeded by Major General Vincent E. Boles
