= Rebecca S. Halstead =

United States Army general

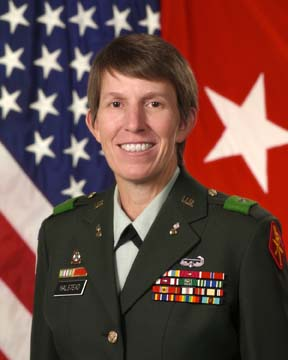
- Halstead as commander of the Army Ordnance Center
- Born: 1959 (age 66–67); Willseyville, Candor, New York, U.S.
- Military career
- Allegiance: United States
- Branch: United States Army
- Service years: 1981–2008
- Rank: Brigadier General
- Commands: Chief of Ordnance; United States Army Ordnance Center and Schools; 3rd Corps Support Command; 10th Division Support Command; 325th Forward Support Battalion
- Conflicts: War in Afghanistan; Iraq War
- Awards: Army Distinguished Service Medal; Defense Superior Service Medal; Legion of Merit (2); Bronze Star Medal
- Other work: President, United States Army Ordnance Corps Association; Executive Director for Leader Development, Praevius Group; Founder, Steadfast Leadership

Rebecca Stevens "Becky" Halstead (born 1959) is a former United States Army officer and the first female graduate of West Point to become a general officer. She was the 34th Chief of Ordnance and Commandant of the United States Army Ordnance Center and Schools at Aberdeen Proving Ground, Maryland.

== Early life ==
Halstead was born in Willseyville, New York in 1959, and is a 1977 graduate of Candor High School. She graduated from the United States Military Academy with a Bachelor of Science in 1981 and was a member of the second academy class that included women.

== Early career ==
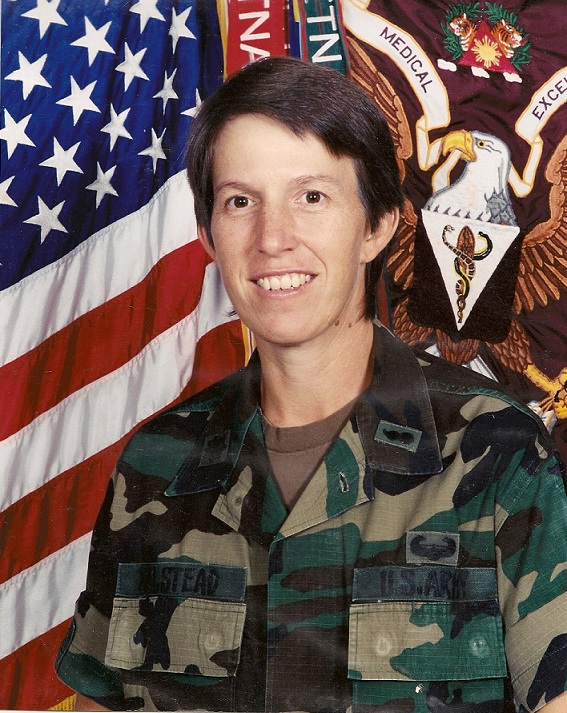
Lieutenant Colonel Halstead, commander, 325th Forward Support Battalion, 1997

When she was assigned to the Ordnance Corps, her early positions included: platoon leader, operations officer and executive officer with the 69th Ordnance Company, 559th Artillery Group in Vicenza, Italy; commander, Headquarters and Headquarters Company, 80th Ordnance Battalion, Fort Lewis, Washington; commander, 63rd Ordnance company, 80th Ordnance Battalion, Fort Lewis, Washington; and Materiel Officer, 80th Ordnance Battalion, Fort Lewis, Washington.

Her later assignments included: assignment officer, Ordnance Branch, Total Army Personnel Command, Alexandria, Virginia; aide-de-camp to the commander, Combined Arms Support Command and Fort Lee, Fort Lee, Virginia; support operations officer and battalion executive officer, 526th Forward Support Battalion, 101st Airborne Division, Fort Campbell, Kentucky; logistics staff officer, and assistant executive officer to the U.S. Army's Deputy Chief of Staff for Logistics; commander, 325th Forward Support Battalion, 25th Infantry Division, Schofield Barracks, Hawaii; commander, 10th Mountain Division Support Command (DISCOM), Fort Drum, New York, including duty as logistics staff officer (C-4) for Coalition Task Force Afghanistan during Operation Enduring Freedom; and executive officer to the combatant commander, United States Southern Command, Miami, Florida.

== Later career ==
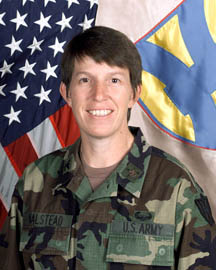
Colonel Halstead as deputy commander of 21st Theater Support Command, 2003

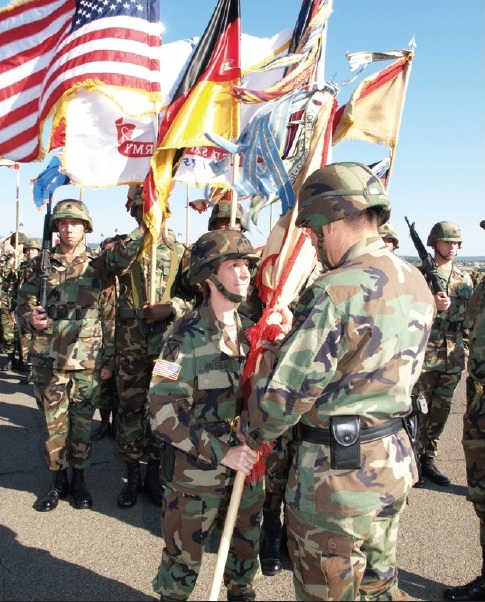
Brigadier General Halstead accepts 3rd COSCOM colors during change of command ceremony, 2004

In September 2003 Halstead was assigned as Deputy Commander of the 21st Theater Support Command in Germany. In September 2004 she was assigned as commander, the 3rd Corps Support Command (COSCOM), including deployment to Iraq for the Iraq War. In January 2005, she was promoted to brigadier general, the first female graduate of West Point to attain general officer rank.

In 2006 Halstead was assigned as the Army's Chief of Ordnance and commander, U.S. Army Ordnance Center and Schools at Aberdeen Proving Ground, Maryland. During her tenure, she took part in the planning for the Army's effort to streamline its Ordnance, Transportation and Supply career fields by creating a single Combined Logistics branch. As part of the Base Realignment and Closure (BRAC) initiative, this streamlining included the closing of the Ordnance Center at Aberdeen Proving Ground and relocating it to Fort Lee, Virginia. She retired from the military in June 2008.

== Education ==
Halstead is a graduate of the Army's Ordnance Officer Basic and Officer Advanced Courses. She obtained a Master of Military Art and Science degree from the U.S. Army Command and General Staff College at Fort Leavenworth, Kansas, in 1993, and in 2000 she received a Master of Science degree in national resource strategy from the National War College, Fort McNair, Washington, D.C.

== Awards and qualification badges ==
Halstead's military decorations include: the Distinguished Service Medal; the Defense Superior Service Medal; two awards of the Legion of Merit; the Bronze Star Medal; five awards of the Meritorious Service Medal; two awards of the Army Commendation Medal; and the Army Achievement Medal. She also earned the Air Assault Badge and the Army Staff Identification Badge.

== Post-military career ==
After her retirement Halstead was elected President of the U.S. Army Ordnance Corps Association, and joined the Praevius Group, a Virginia-based consulting firm, as Executive Director for Leader Development. She later founded her own consulting firm, Steadfast Leadership. In addition, she is a spokesperson for the Foundation for Chiropractic Progress.

== Other honors ==
In 2007 Halstead received the National Women’s History Project award for "Generations of Women Moving History Forward." In 2011 she became the first woman to have a room named after her at West Point's Thayer Hotel. She is also a 2011 inductee of the Ordnance Corps Hall of Fame. In 2013 she was inducted into the New Jersey Women's Hall of Fame. In 2021, Halstead was inducted into the National Women's Hall of Fame.

== See also ==
- List of female United States military generals and flag officers

Military offices
Preceded by Vincent E. Boles	Chief of Ordnance of the United States Army; 2006–2008	Succeeded by Lynn A. Collyar
