= Colden Ruggles =

U.S. Army general (1869–1933)

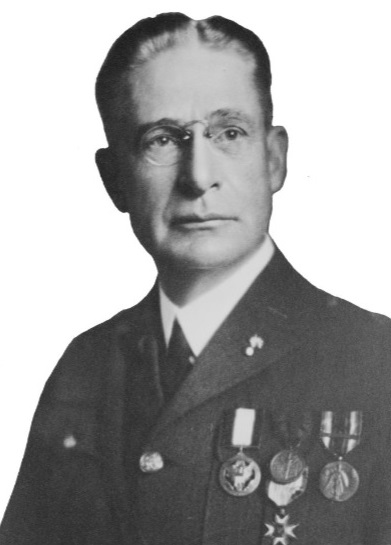
- From 1987's Quarters One, Aberdeen Proving Ground
- Born: Colden L'Hommedieu Ruggles; March 18, 1869; Omaha, Nebraska, US
- Died: April 2, 1933 (aged 64); Charleston, South Carolina, US
- Burial place: Arlington National Cemetery
- Spouse: Mary Appleton Miller (m. 1894)
- Children: 1
- Military career
- Allegiance: United States
- Branch: United States Army
- Service years: 1890–1930
- Rank: Brigadier General
- Units: U.S. Army Field Artillery Branch; U.S. Army Ordnance Corps
- Commands: Benicia Arsenal; Manila Ordnance Depot; Sandy Hook Proving Ground; Aberdeen Proving Ground; U.S. Army Chief of Ordnance (acting)
- Conflicts: Spanish–American War; World War I
- Awards: Army Distinguished Service Medal

Colden L'Hommedieu Ruggles (March 18, 1869 – April 2, 1933) was a career officer in the United States Army. A prominent member of the Ordnance Corps, he attained the rank of brigadier general, and was notable for planning and overseeing construction of Aberdeen Proving Ground, Maryland. In addition, he was noteworthy for his service as acting Chief of Ordnance in 1930.

== Early life ==
Colden L'Hommedieu Ruggles was born in Omaha, Nebraska, on March 18, 1869, the son of Brigadier General George D. Ruggles and Alma Hammond (née L'Hommedieu) Ruggles (a daughter of Stephen S. L'Hommedieu).

Ruggles was educated at various Army posts as the Ruggles family traveled during George Ruggles' career, including Omaha and Saint Paul, Minnesota. In 1886, he began attendance at the United States Military Academy. He graduated in 1890 and was ranked fifth in his class of 54. Ruggles received his commission as a second lieutenant of Field Artillery, and was assigned to the 1st Artillery Regiment at Fort Columbus, New York.

== Career ==
Ruggles remained with the 1st Artillery until August 1891, when he was assigned to the 3rd Artillery at Fort Monroe, Virginia. He remained at Fort Monroe until December 1893, and was on detached duty as an instructor at the Artillery School beginning in September 1892. Ruggles was promoted to first lieutenant on December 18, 1893, and assigned to the Ordnance Corps.

After his assignment to Ordnance, Ruggles became an acknowledged expert in the design, production, and quality control inspection of artillery, small arms, and ammunition. He served at Frankford Arsenal, Pennsylvania from January to October 1894 and at Sandy Hook Proving Ground, New Jersey from October 1894 to October 1896. He was on duty at Frankford Arsenal again from October 1896 to February 1900.

During the Spanish–American War, Ruggles was offered promotion to temporary major in the United States Volunteers, which he declined in order to remain on duty at Frankford Arsenal. During the war, Ruggles was assigned to inspect the manufacture of ammunition by civilian corporations including the United States Cartridge Company (Lowell, Massachusetts), Union Metallic Cartridge Company (Bridgeport, Connecticut), and Winchester Repeating Arms Company (New Haven, Connecticut). He was promoted to captain on April 22, 1899.

=== Continued career ===
Ruggles as a brigadier general after World War I

Ruggles served as an Ordnance inspector at the Bethlehem Steel Company in Bethlehem, Pennsylvania, from February 1900 to July 1903. In 1903, he graduated from Lehigh University with an E.E. degree (electrical engineering). He was an inspector at Watertown Arsenal, Massachusetts, from July 1903 to August 1908 and was promoted to major on June 25, 1906. He served as professor of Ordnance and Gunnery at the United States Military Academy from August 1908 to June 1911, and was promoted to lieutenant colonel on April 13, 1911. In 1910, Ruggles published Stresses in Wire-Wrapped Guns and in Gun Carriages, a technical work which was used by Army Ordnance and Artillery officers.

From June 1911 to July 1913, Ruggles was assigned as Ordnance officer for the Army's Western Department and commander of Benicia Arsenal, California. He served in the Philippines from September 1913 to October 1915, assigned as Ordnance officer of the Philippine Department and commander of the Manila Ordnance Depot. From December 1915 to March 1918, Ruggles commanded Sandy Hook Proving Ground, New Jersey, and he was promoted to colonel on May 15, 1917.

=== World War I ===
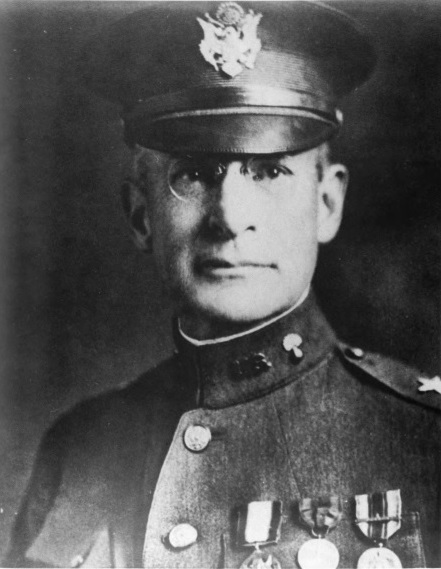
From 1987's Quarters One, Aberdeen Proving Ground

While serving as commander of Sandy Hook Proving Ground, Ruggles planned and oversaw construction of Aberdeen Proving Ground, Maryland, which he commanded from October 1917 to March 1918. From March 1918 to January 1919, Ruggles served at the Ordnance Department's headquarters in Washington, D.C., first as Chief of the Supply Division, then as Chief of the Inspection Division. He was promoted to temporary brigadier general on August 8, 1918.

From October to December 1918, Ruggles served on temporary inspection and observation duty with the American Expeditionary Forces in England and France. At the end of the war, he received the Army Distinguished Service Medal in recognition of his efforts to create Aberdeen Proving Ground. The citation for the medal reads:

For especially meritorious and distinguished service. The conception and construction of the Aberdeen Proving Ground and its operation during the early and most difficult period of its history are a monument to his sagacity and unremitting labor.

=== Post-World War I ===
After the war, Ruggles was assigned as Chief of the Ordnance Department's Technical Staff. He served in this position from January 1919 to July 1921. In March 1919, he reverted to his permanent rank of colonel. He was a student at the United States Army War College from August 1921 to June 1922 and after graduating he returned to his post as Chief of the Technical Staff at the Ordnance Department.

From August 1923 until retiring in August 1930, Ruggles served as Chief of Ordnance Department's Manufacturing Division and Assistant Chief of Ordnance. On March 28, 1927, Ruggles was again promoted to brigadier general. From April to June 1930, Ruggles served as acting Chief of Ordnance.

=== Later life ===
In retirement, Ruggles was a resident of Charleston, South Carolina. He was a member of the American Society of Automotive Engineers, American Society of Mechanical Engineers and U.S. Army Ordnance Corps Association. He was a member of the General Society of Colonial Wars, The Huguenot Society of America, and American Legion. He was also a hereditary member of the Military Order of the Loyal Legion of the United States.

== Personal life ==
In November 1894, Ruggles married Mary Appleton Miller (1870–1950), the daughter of Brigadier General Marcus P. Miller (1835–1906). They were the parents of a daughter, Colden (1898–1967), the wife of Eustace L. Florance of Baltimore, Maryland.

Ruggles died in Charleston on April 2, 1933. He was buried at Arlington National Cemetery.
