= Vincent E. Boles =

United States Army general

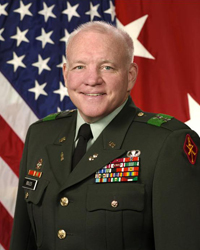
- Major General Vincent E. Boles
- Born: December 31, 1954 (age 71); Manhattan, New York, U.S.
- Military career
- Branch: United States Army
- Service years: 1976 - 2009
- Rank: Major general
- Commands: 33rd Chief of Ordnance (2004–2006)

Vincent E. Boles (born December 31, 1954) is a retired major general in the United States Army and served as the 33rd Chief of Ordnance and Commandant of the U.S. Army Ordnance School at Aberdeen Proving Grounds, Maryland.

== Military education ==
Boles was commissioned a Second Lieutenant in the Ordnance Corps in 1976 upon graduation from Niagara University with a Bachelor of Arts degree in history. He has also earned a Master in Business Administration degree from Babson College, Massachusetts. His military education includes Ordnance Officer Basic and Advanced Courses, United States Army Organizational Effectiveness Course, United States Army Command and General Staff College, and United States Army War College.

== Military career ==
Boles' command tours include Commander, 530th & 514th Maintenance Companies, 544th Maintenance Battalion, 194th Armored Brigade, Fort Knox, Kentucky; Commander, 701st Main Support Battalion, Division Support Command, 1st Infantry Division (Mechanized), Fort Riley, Kansas; and Commander, Division Support Command, 4th Infantry Division (Mechanized), Fort Hood, Texas.

In 2001, he assumed the office of Commanding General, United States Army Field Support Command, Rock Island Arsenal, Illinois. In January 2003, in addition to his role as Commanding General of Army Field Support Command, he accepted duty as Commander, Army Materiel Command - Southwest Asia/Deputy C-4, Coalition Forces Land Component Command, Camp Arifjan, Kuwait. During these assignments, he assumed control of all war reserve stocks and equipment, oversight of 52 technical assistance offices, and the Army's Logistics Civilian Augmentation Contracting Program. From 2001 through 2002, Boles supported the invasion of Afghanistan with forward deployed forces and equipment packages, and began the flow of war reserve equipment from around the world to prepare for Iraq War.

From July 2003 until August 2004, he served as the Commanding General, 3d Corps Support Command, United States Army Europe and Seventh Army, and deployed in support of the Iraq War.

On September 10, 2004, Boles became the 33rd Chief of Ordnance and Commandant of the U.S. Army Ordnance Center and School at Aberdeen Proving Ground, Maryland. His special focus in this assignment was in exploiting the emerging lessons being learned in the Global War on Terror Operations and embedding them in training programs.

His staff assignments include Aide-de-Camp to U.S. Commander, Berlin; Chief Officer Management, U.S. Command, Berlin; Organizational Effectiveness Officer, Berlin; Support Operations Officer and Division Materiel Management Center Chief, 498th Support Battalion, 2nd Armored Division (Forward) and G-4, 2nd Armored Division, U.S. Army Europe and Seventh Army with a deployment in support of the Gulf War; Logistics Assistance Officer, Fort Riley, Kansas; Executive Officer to Commanding General, U.S. Army Materiel Command; and Deputy Chief of Staff for Ammunition, U.S. Army Materiel Command.

He reported for his last assignment as the Assistant Deputy Chief of Staff, G-4 in the Pentagon on October 30, 2006. In this position he was responsible for the oversight of Army Logistics Operations and Readiness, Force Deployment and Distribution, and Logistics Strategy and Integration.Boles retired in 2009.

== Awards and decorations ==
Major General Boles' awards and decorations include the Distinguished Service Medal, Legion of Merit (with oak leaf cluster), the Bronze Star Medal (with two oak leaf clusters), the Defense Meritorious Service Medal, Meritorious Service Medal (with four oak leaf clusters), the Army Commendation Medal, the Army Achievement Medal, and the Parachutist Badge.

Military offices
Preceded by Brigadier General William M. Lenaers	Chief of Ordnance of the United States Army; 2004 - 2006	Succeeded by Brigadier General Rebecca S. Halstead
