= Chief of Ordnance of the United States Army =

General officer who is responsible for the U.S. Army Ordnance Corps

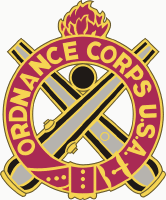
- United States Army Ordnance Corps regimental insignia
- Incumbent; Colonel Charles L. Montgomery since June 30, 2026
- Formation: May 14, 1812
- First holder: COL Decius Wadsworth
- Website: Official website

The Chief of Ordnance of the United States Army is a general officer who is responsible for the Army Ordnance Corps and serves as the commandant of the U.S. Army Ordnance School at Fort Lee. The Chief of Ordnance is primarily focused on the doctrine, training, and professional development of Ordnance officers and soldiers. The position was created simultaneously with the establishment of the United States Army Ordnance Department on May 14, 1812.

== History ==
=== 18th century ===
The American Revolution established the general outlines of the future Ordnance Department. The Continental Congress' Board for War and Ordnance created the Commissary General for Military Stores to establish and operate ordnance facilities in an effort to alleviate the dependence on foreign arms and munitions. Colonel Benjamin Flower led the Commissary from his appointment in January 1775 until his death in May 1781. Ordnance facilities were established at Springfield Armory, Massachusetts, and Carlisle Barracks, Pennsylvania, for the production of arms, powder, and shot. After the war, the logistic elements were disbanded and the authority for procurement and provision of all things military was transferred to the Office of the Purveyor of Public Supplies located within the Treasury Department.

=== 19th century ===
By the dawn of the War of 1812, the Secretary of War recognized the need for a distinct branch to manage the procurement, research, and maintenance of Ordnance materiel. Decius Wadsworth, previously superintendent of West Point, was appointed a colonel and given the title Commissary General of Ordnance, later changed to Chief of Ordnance. His ambition, during the war years and afterward, was to simplify and streamline Ordnance materiel management. His staff worked to reduce the variety of small arms and artillery pieces to a few efficient models. In addition, he aimed to develop a cadre of highly trained Ordnance officers who could dedicate their inventive ingenuity to their profession.

=== 20th century ===
Between 1906 and 1915, Chief of Ordnance Brig. Gen. William Crozier attempted to introduce scientific management systems into his department. With industrial productivity receiving national attention through the efforts of Frederick Winslow Taylor and others, Crozier sought favorable comparisons with private industry in his Congressional relations. Strikes at the Watertown Arsenal and Rock Island Arsenal limited the use of time studies and piece rates in the department, but at Springfield Arsenal a century's development of piece rates precluded the need for such studies or conflict. New Armory practices borrowed or influenced by Taylorism included centralized planning for better routing of tasks and components, improved accounting systems for tools and raw materials, introduction of high-speed tool steels, and reorganization of shop floors. By 1915, Armory managers also obtained substantial amounts of new equipment and completed direct rail links from the Armories to trunk lines. Better on-site transportation, along with increased use of electrical power and rebuilt power transmission systems, removed most of the Armory's long-standing geographic and power supply limitations. Capital improvements, and new accounting practices to control manufacturing materials purchases, had significant effects in reducing production costs, but still left the Army with a limited capacity to respond to a major conflict. But Crozier had problems obtaining budget too.

Ordnance Department supply failures during the first months of formal American involvement in the First World War cost Crozier his job, despite several attempts at wholesale departmental reorganization along functional lines with decentralized districts. In part by delegating more authority to district civilian managers, Crozier's successor, Maj. Gen. Clarence C. Williams (Chief of Ordnance, 1918-30), succeeded in gaining on ordnance supply problems as the war ended, by which time the department's reputation remained clouded.

Following the massive reorganization of the Army in 1962 based on the Hoelscher Committee Report, the Ordnance Corps and the office of the Chief of Ordnance was disestablished. The Ordnance branch continued under the direction of the Army's Deputy Chief of Staff for Logistics. Army Materiel Command assumed responsibility for many of the Ordnance Corps historical functions; research, development, procurement, production, storage and technical intelligence.

In 1985, the Ordnance Corps became the first of the Army's support elements to re-establish itself under the branch regimental concept. The Office of the Chief of Ordnance was reestablished and regained responsibility for decisions concerning personnel, force structure, doctrine, and training. This change gave the opportunity for Ordnance officers, soldiers, and civilians to identify with their historical predecessors in their mission of Ordnance support to the U.S. Army.

=== 21st century ===
In accordance with the 2005 Base Closure and Realignment Commission, the U.S. Army Ordnance School and the Chief of Ordnance moved from Aberdeen Proving Ground, Maryland to Fort Lee, Virginia.

In Fiscal Year 2024, all sustainment commandants were reduced on the Tables of Distributions and Allowances (TDA). The Chief of Ordnance was reduced from brigadier general to colonel. The current Chief of Ordnance is Colonel Charles L. Montgomery.

== List of Army Chiefs of Ordnance ==
	Name	Photo	Term began	Term ended
1.	Colonel Decius Wadsworth		July 2, 1812	June 1, 1821
2.	Colonel George Bomford		May 30, 1832	March 25, 1848
3.	Brevet Brigadier General George Talcott		March 25, 1848	July 10, 1851
4.	Colonel Henry K. Craig		July 10, 1851	April 23, 1861
5.	Brevet Brigadier General James Wolfe Ripley		April 23, 1861	September 15, 1863
6.	Brigadier General George D. Ramsay		September 15, 1863	September 12, 1864
7.	Brevet Major General Alexander B. Dyer		September 12, 1864	May 20, 1874
8.	Brigadier General Stephen Vincent Benet		June 23, 1874	January 22, 1891
9.	Brigadier General Daniel W. Flagler		January 23, 1891	March 29, 1899
10.	Brigadier General Adelbert R. Buffington		April 5, 1899	November 22, 1901
11.	Brigadier General William Crozier		November 22, 1901	December 19, 1917
Acting	Brigadier General Charles B. Wheeler		20 December 1917	19 April 1918
Acting	Brigadier General William S. Peirce		19 April 1918	2 May 1918
12.	Major General Clarence C. Williams		May 2, 1918	April 1, 1930
Acting	Brigadier General Colden Ruggles		April 2, 1930	June 2, 1930
13.	Major General Samuel Hof		June 3, 1930	June 2, 1934
14.	Major General William H. Tschappat		June 3, 1934	June 2, 1938
15.	Major General Charles M. Wesson		June 3, 1938	May 3, 1942
16.	Major General Levin H. Campbell Jr.		June 1, 1942	May 31, 1946
17.	Major General Everett S. Hughes		June 1, 1946	October 31, 1949
18.	Major General Elbert L. Ford		November 1, 1949	October 31, 1953
19.	Lieutenant General Emerson L. Cummings		November 1, 1953	April 2, 1958
20.	Lieutenant General John H. Hinrichs		April 2, 1958	May 31, 1962
21.	Major General Horace F. Bigelow		June 1, 1962	July 31, 1962
22.	Major General William E. Potts		October 28, 1985	June 13, 1986
23.	Major General Leon E. Salomon		June 13, 1986	August 12, 1988
24.	Major General James W. Ball		August 12, 1988	July 13, 1990
25.	Brigadier General Johnnie E. Wilson		July 13, 1990	June 30, 1992
26.	Major General John G. Coburn		June 30, 1992	June 20, 1994
27.	Major General James W. Monroe		June 20, 1994	August 11, 1995
28.	Major General Robert D. Shadley		August 11, 1995	July 10, 1997
29.	Brigadier General Thomas R. Dickinson		July 10, 1997	September 18, 1998
30.	Major General Dennis K. Jackson		October 20, 1998	July 25, 2000
31.	Major General Mitchell H. Stevenson		July 25, 2000	August 15, 2003
32.	Brigadier General William M. Lenaers		August 15, 2003	September 10, 2004
33.	Major General Vincent E. Boles		September 10, 2004	October 30, 2006
34.	Brigadier General Rebecca S. Halstead		October 30, 2006	June 26, 2008
35.	Brigadier General Lynn A. Collyar		June 26, 2008	July 29, 2010
36.	Brigadier General Clark W. LeMasters Jr.		July 29, 2010	March 21, 2012
37.	Brigadier General Edward M. Daly		June 12, 2012	May 17, 2013
38.	Brigadier General John F. Haley		May 17, 2013	June 12, 2015
39	Brigadier General Kurt J. Ryan		July 10, 2015	June 1, 2016
40	Brigadier General David Wilson		August 10, 2016	May 8, 2018
41	Brigadier General Heidi J. Hoyle		May 8, 2018	May 21, 2020
42	Brigadier General Michelle M.T. Letcher		June 16, 2020	June 21, 2021
43	Brigadier General Michael B. Lalor		July 13, 2021	July 6, 2023
44	Brigadier General Steven L. Allen		July 6, 2023	June 4, 2024
45	Colonel Robin (Rob) Montgomery		June 5, 2024	June 30, 2026
46	Colonel Charles L. Montgomery		June 30, 2026	Present

=== Acting Chiefs ===
The following individuals have served as acting Chief of Ordnance:

- Major Charles Shaler. Shaler served from 29 March to 5 April 1899, after the death of Daniel Flagler and before Adelbert Buffington.
- Colonel Rogers Birnie. Birnie served while William Crozier served as President of the Army War College during the 1912–1913 academic year.
- Brigadier General Charles B. Wheeler. Wheeler served from 20 December 1917 to 19 April 1918.
- Brigadier General William S. Peirce. Peirce served from 19 April until 2 May 1918.
- Brigadier General Colden L'Hommedieu Ruggles. Ruggles served from 1 April to 3 June 1930.
