= Rock Island Arsenal, Illinois =

Rock Island Arsenal
- Unincorporated community
- Location of Rock Island Arsenal within Illinois
- Coordinates: 41°31′01″N 90°32′27″W
- Country: United States
- State: Illinois
- County: Rock Island County

Area
  - Total: 2.6 sq mi (6.7 km^{2})
  - Land: 1.6 sq mi (4.1 km^{2})
  - Water: 1.0 sq mi (2.6 km^{2})
- Elevation: 577 ft (176 m)

Population (2010)
  - Total: 149
  - Density: 93/sq mi (36/km^{2})
- Time zone: UTC-6 (CST)
  - Summer (DST): UTC-5 (CDT)
- Zip code: 61280
- GNIS feature ID: 2393210

Rock Island Arsenal is a census-designated place (CDP) in Rock Island County, Illinois, United States. As of the 2020 census, Rock Island Arsenal had a population of 182. The island contains the Rock Island National Cemetery.

== Geography ==
According to the United States Census Bureau, the CDP has a total area of 2.6 square miles (6.7 km^{2}), of which 1.6 square miles (4.1 km^{2}) is land and 1.0 square mile (2.6 km^{2}) (37.89%) is water.

== Demographics ==
Historical population
Census	Pop.	Note	%±
2000	145		—
2010	149		2.8%
2020	182		22.1%
U.S. Decennial Census

=== 2020 census ===
Rock Island Arsenal CDP, Illinois – Racial and ethnic composition Note: the US Census treats Hispanic/Latino as an ethnic category. This table excludes Latinos from the racial categories and assigns them to a separate category. Hispanics/Latinos may be of any race.
Race / Ethnicity (NH = Non-Hispanic)	Pop 2000	Pop 2010	Pop 2020	% 2000	% 2010	% 2020
White alone (NH)	91	76	101	62.76%	51.01%	55.49%
Black or African American alone (NH)	41	42	24	28.28%	28.19%	13.19%
Native American or Alaska Native alone (NH)	2	2	0	1.38%	1.34%	0.00%
Asian alone (NH)	0	0	9	0.00%	0.00%	4.95%
Native Hawaiian or Pacific Islander alone (NH)	0	0	0	0.00%	0.00%	0.00%
Other race alone (NH)	1	0	6	0.69%	0.00%	3.30%
Mixed race or Multiracial (NH)	6	6	26	4.14%	4.03%	14.29%
Hispanic or Latino (any race)	4	23	16	2.76%	15.44%	8.79%
Total	145	149	182	100.00%	100.00%	100.00%

=== 2000 census ===
As of the census of 2000, there were 145 people, 43 households, and 40 families residing in the CDP. The population density was 90.9 inhabitants per square mile (35.1/km^{2}). There were 43 housing units at an average density of 27.0 per square mile (10.4/km^{2}). The racial makeup of the CDP was 62.76% White, 28.28% African American, 1.38% Native American, 3.45% from other races, and 4.14% from two or more races. Hispanic or Latino of any race were 2.76% of the population.

There were 43 households, out of which 79.1% had children under the age of 18 living with them, 88.4% were married couples living together, 4.7% had a female householder with no husband present, and 4.7% were non-families. 4.7% of all households were made up of individuals, and none had someone living alone who was 65 years of age or older. The average household size was 3.37 and the average family size was 3.46.

In the CDP, the population was spread out, with 41.4% under the age of 18, 4.1% from 18 to 24, 45.5% from 25 to 44, 9.0% from 45 to 64, . The median age was 28 years. For every 100 females, there were 93.3 males. For every 100 females age 18 and over, there were 93.2 males.

The median income for a household in the CDP was $45,417, and the median income for a family was $34,375. Males had a median income of $29,063 versus $23,125 for females. The per capita income for the CDP was $15,710. None of the population and none of the families were below the poverty line.

== See also ==
- Quad Cities
