= TACOM =

Army command for ground vehicles' acquisition and logistics

Tank-automotive and Armaments Command (TACOM)
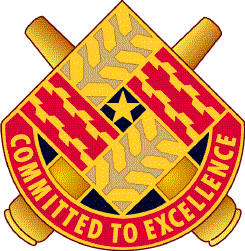
- TACOM distinctive unit insignia
- Active: 1942–present
- Country: United States
- Branch: United States Army
- Type: Army command
- Part of: U.S. Army Materiel Command
- Garrison/HQ: Detroit Arsenal
- Website: tacom.army.mil

Commanders
- Commanding general: BG Beth A. Behn
- Command Sergeant Major: CSM Kofie B. Primus

The U.S. Army Tank-automotive and Armaments Command (TACOM), and its subordinate Life-Cycle Management Command (LCMC) are headquartered at the Detroit Arsenal in Warren, Michigan. TACOM is a component of the U.S. Army Materiel Command.

== Organization ==
The complex that houses TACOM's headquarters is located at the Detroit Arsenal. TACOM has subordinate installations located at Anniston Army Depot in Alabama, Red River Army Depot in Texas, Sierra Army Depot in California, and Watervliet Arsenal in New York. TACOM also has significant numbers of personnel located at Rock Island Arsenal, Illinois, and Natick Soldier Center (NSC), Massachusetts.

=== Co-operations ===
The Detroit Arsenal also houses the laboratories and facilities of the U.S. Army DEVCOM Ground Vehicle Systems Center (GVSC), which formerly was known as the U.S. Army Tank Automotive Research, Development and Engineering Center (TARDEC). DEVCOM GVSC is TACOM's partner for ground vehicle technology and engineering. It is subordinate to U.S. Army Combat Capabilities Development Command (DEVCOM).

Defense Acquisition University (DAU) has a branch at TACOM, assisting with the training and certification of employees in necessary logistics and acquisition methods for the U.S. federal government. The training (and certification) is conducted by instructors at TACOM and elsewhere, providing lectures and briefings on logistics and acquisition topics.

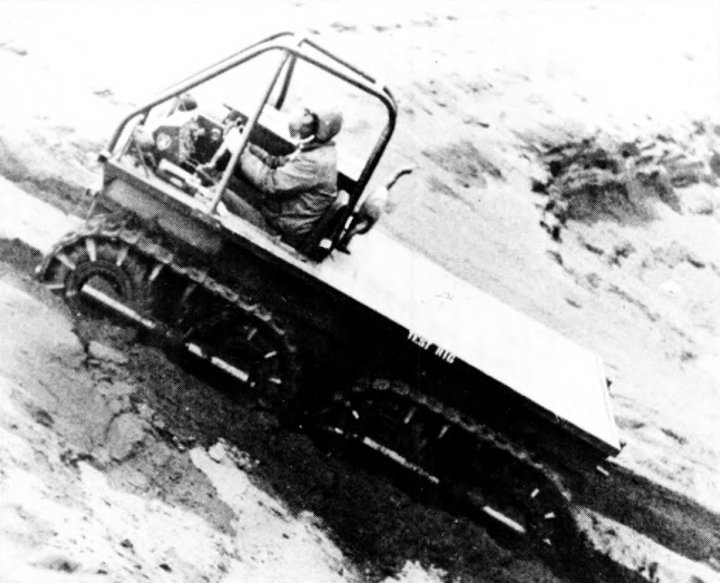
XM900 Wheel/Track Convertible Test Rig, 3/4-ton developed by TACOM engineers, 1975

== List of commanding generals ==
No.	Commanding General		Term		
No.	Portrait	Name	Took office	Left office	Duration
–	Roy E. Beauchamp	Major General; Roy E. Beauchamp (born 1945)	June 1997	August 13, 1999	~2 years, 73 days
–	John S. Caldwell Jr.	Major General; John S. Caldwell Jr.	August 13, 1999	October 4, 2001	~2 years, 52 days
–	N. Ross Thompson III	Major General; N. Ross Thompson III	October 4, 2001	September 28, 2004	~2 years, 360 days
–	William M. Lenaers	Major General; William M. Lenaers	September 28, 2004	April 22, 2008	~3 years, 234 days
–	Scott G. West	Major General; Scott G. West	April 22, 2008	January 30, 2010	1 year, 283 days
–	Kurt J. Stein	Major General; Kurt J. Stein	January 30, 2010	June 21, 2012	2 years, 143 days
–	Michael J. Terry	Major General; Michael J. Terry	June 21, 2012	June 25, 2014	2 years, 4 days
–	Gwen Bingham	Major General; Gwen Bingham (born 1959)	June 25, 2014	May 2, 2016	1 year, 312 days
–	Clark W. LeMasters Jr.	Major General; Clark W. LeMasters Jr.	May 2, 2016	July 12, 2018	2 years, 71 days
–	Daniel G. Mitchell	Major General; Daniel G. Mitchell	July 12, 2018	June 12, 2020	1 year, 336 days
–	Darren L. Werner	Major General; Darren L. Werner	June 12, 2020	July 19, 2023	3 years, 37 days
–	Michael B. Lalor	Major General; Michael B. Lalor	July 19, 2023	July 22, 2025	2 years, 3 days
–	Beth A. Behn	Brigadier General; Beth A. Behn	July 22, 2025	Incumbent	252 days
