= Francis L. Parker =

United States Army brigadier general (1873–1966)

- Parker in 1921 passport photo
- Born: 24 June 1873; Abbeville, South Carolina, US
- Died: 16 May 1966 (aged 92); Charleston, South Carolina, US
- Burial place: Trinity Episcopal Church and Cemetery, Abbeville, South Carolina, US
- Education: United States Military Academy; United States Army Command and General Staff College; United States Army War College
- Military career
- Service: United States Army
- Service years: 1894–1936
- Rank: Brigadier General
- Service number: 0-440
- Units: US Army Cavalry Branch; US Army Field Artillery Branch
- Commands: Post at Balayan; Post at Lipa; Troop E, 12th Cavalry Regiment; Fort D. A. Russell; 119th Infantry Regiment; 312th Cavalry Regiment; 171st Infantry Brigade; 1st Cavalry Regiment; 12th Field Artillery Regiment; 1st Field Artillery Brigade; Bureau of Insular Affairs; 2nd Field Artillery Brigade; Fort Stotsenburg; 1st Cavalry Division
- Conflicts: Spanish–American War; Military Government of Porto Rico; Philippine–American War; World War I Occupation of the Rhineland
- Awards: Spanish War Service Medal; Army of Cuban Occupation Medal; Philippine Campaign Medal; World War I Victory Medal; Order of Abdon Calderón (Second Class) (Ecuador)

Francis Le Jau Parker (Note: Parker is sometimes confused with Frank Parker, an army contemporary who was also from South Carolina. Francis Parker's name appears in records variously as Francis Le Jau Parker, Francis LeJau Parker, Francis Le J. Parker, Francis LeJ. Parker, Francis L. J. Parker, and Francis L. Parker. Generals In Khaki misspells Parker's middle name as LeJou.) (24 June 1873 – 16 May 1966) was a career officer in the United States Army. An 1894 graduate of the United States Military Academy (West Point), Parker served until 1936 and was a veteran of the Spanish–American War, Philippine–American War, and World War I. He attained the rank of brigadier general, and his commands included the: Post at Balayan; Post at Lipa; Troop E, 12th Cavalry Regiment; Fort D. A. Russell; 119th Infantry Regiment; 312th Cavalry Regiment; 171st Infantry Brigade; 1st Cavalry Regiment; 12th Field Artillery Regiment; 1st Field Artillery Brigade; Bureau of Insular Affairs; 2nd Field Artillery Brigade; Post at Fort Stotsenburg; and 1st Cavalry Division.

A native of Abbeville, South Carolina, Parker was raised and educated in Abbeville and in 1890 he began attendance at the United States Military Academy. After his 1894 graduation, he began a career in the Cavalry. His initial assignments were at several posts in Texas, in addition to serving on the West Point faculty as a language instructor in 1897 and 1898. During the Spanish–American War, he served as judge advocate for the Department of Puerto Principe, Cuba and participated in the post-war Military Government of Porto Rico. During the Philippine–American War, he served as aide-de-camp to Brigadier General George Whitefield Davis in Manila while Davis was provost marshal of the Military Government of the Philippine Islands.

During the early part of US involvement in World War I, Parker was a US military observer in Romania and US military attaché in Petrograd, Russia. Later in the war, he commanded the 119th Infantry Regiment, 312th Cavalry Regiment, and the 171st Infantry Brigade in the United States. After arriving in France, he was an observer with the 28th Division. After the Armistice of November 11, 1918 ended the war, he was a member of the American Expeditionary Forces staff during the Occupation of the Rhineland.

Following the First World War, Parker carried out several command assignments and special duties, including command of the 1st Cavalry Regiment, vice chairman of the American Electoral Mission that oversaw the 1928 Nicaraguan general election, and chief of the Bureau of Insular Affairs. Near the end of his career, he commanded the post of Fort Stotsenburg in the Philippines, and the 1st Cavalry Division in Texas. He retired in 1936, after which he resided in Charleston, South Carolina.

== Early life ==
Francis L. Parker was born in Abbeville, South Carolina on 24 June 1873, a son of William H. Parker and Lucia Garvey (Wardlaw) Parker. Parker was raised and educated in Abbeville, and in 1890 competed for an appointment to the United States Military Academy at West Point offered by US Representative James S. Cothran. He finished first of seven applicants and received the appointment. He attended from June 1890 to June 1894 and graduated ranked 12th of 54.

Among Parker's classmates who went on to careers as general officers were Clarence C. Williams, Samuel Hof, Dwight Edward Aultman, Paul Bernard Malone, John F. Preston, Hamilton S. Hawkins III, Frank Sherwood Cocheu, Ora Elmer Hunt, Frank Parker, Otho B. Rosenbaum, George Henson Estes, Oliver Edwards, Briant H. Wells, and John William Barker. Among his notable classmates who did not attain general's rank was Butler Ames.

== Start of career ==
After his West Point graduation, Parker was commissioned as a second lieutenant of Cavalry. Assigned to the 5th Cavalry Regiment, he served at Fort Ringgold, Texas from October 1894 to January 1896. He was then assigned to Fort Sam Houston, Texas, where he served until August 1896. After temporary duty at Fort McIntosh, Texas in September, he returned to Fort Sam Houston, where he remained until August 1897. From August 1897 to June 1898, Parker served on the West Point faculty as an instructor in the Department of Modern Languages.

From June 1898 to January 1899, he performed Spanish–American War duty in Tampa, Florida, Fernandina, Florida, and Anniston, Alabama as aide-de-camp to Brigadier General Louis H. Carpenter, commander of 1st Division, Third Army Corps. From January to June 1899, he was acting judge advocate for the Department of Puerto Principe, Cuba. He was promoted to first lieutenant in March 1899. In July 1899, he joined the 5th Cavalry in Mayagüez, Puerto Rico during its duty as part of the Military Government of Porto Rico. From September 1899 to February 1901, Parker served in San Juan as aide-de-camp to Brigadier General George Whitefield Davis, the military governor of Puerto Rico. He was promoted to captain in February 1901.

From February to July 1901, Parker saw Philippine–American War service as Davis's aide in Manila during Davis's assignment as provost marshal of the Military Government of the Philippine Islands. In July 1901, he was transferred to the 12th Cavalry Regiment, which he joined at Fort Sam Houston. From August 1901 to April 1903, he served with the 12th Cavalry at Fort Clark, Texas. While assigned to Fort Clark, Parker performed detached service at Fort Sam Houston from June to July 1902 and in March 1903.

== Continued career ==
Parker in 1919 or 1920

In May 1903, Parker was again assigned to the Philippines, this time as commander of the station at Balayan in the province of Batangas. From July 1903 to April 1904, he was assigned to the post at Camp McGrath in Batangas province. During this posting, he performed detached service at several bases in the Philippines. In April 1904, he was assigned to command the post at Lipa, Batangas. In September 1904, he returned to the United States and was assigned as an instructor, first in Spanish and later in Modern Languages, at the United States Army Command and General Staff College. From August 1907 to August 1908, he was a student at the School of the Line, which he completed as an honor graduate. From August 1908 to August 1909, he was a student at the Command and General Staff College.

After traveling to the Philippines via Europe, Parker was assigned to command Troop E, 12th Cavalry in Manila from January to September 1910. From September 1910 to March 1912, he was aide-de-camp to William Cameron Forbes, the Governor-General of the Philippines. From March to October 1912, Parker was on detached special duty in China. After returning to the United States, he resumed command of Troop E, 12th Cavalry at Fort Robinson, Nebraska. From April 1913 to April 1914, he commanded his troop and the post at Fort D. A. Russell, Wyoming. From April 1914 to January 1915, Parker commanded 12th Cavalry soldiers during the government's response to miners' strikes in Chandler and Cañon City, Colorado. He then resumed command of Fort D. A. Russell, where he remained until October. From November 1915 to October 1916, he was assigned to Fort Bliss, Texas as the recorder for a board that reviewed and revised Cavalry drill regulations. He received promotion to major in July 1916.

From November 1916 to May 1917, Parker was assigned to World War I duty in Romania as an observer of Romanian forces in the field. (Note: In appreciation for this service, Queen Marie of Romania presented Parker with an autographed photo.)In June and July 1917, he served as US military attaché in Petrograd, Russia, and he was present for Russia's Tarnopol offensive. In July and August 1917, he was the US military representative at the Russian military headquarters in Mogilev. He was promoted to lieutenant colonel in July and temporary colonel in August. After returning to the United States in August, Parker was assigned to Camp Jackson, South Carolina, where he helped organize the 161st Depot Brigade and the 81st Division's Officer Training School. From December 1918 to April 1918, he was assigned to Camp Sevier, South Carolina, where he commanded the 119th Infantry Regiment, a unit of the 30th Division. From April to June 1918, he commanded the 312th Cavalry Regiment at Fort Myer, Virginia.

== Later career ==
Parker (center) takes oath as chief of Insular Affairs Bureau in 1929. Predecessor Frank McIntyre is at left.

Inauguration of phone service between US and Philippines, March 1933. Parker is standing at far right. Other attendees include Douglas MacArthur, standing third from left.

In July 1918, Parker was promoted to temporary brigadier general and assigned to command the 171st Infantry Brigade, a unit of the 86th Division undergoing training at Camp Grant, Illinois. In September, the brigade departed for combat in France, and after arriving in October, it took up posts in Gironde, where it completed final organization and training before moving to the front lines. On 23 October, Parker was attached to the 28th Division as an observer during combat in the Toul sector, and he remained with the division until 5 November. He briefly rejoined his brigade in early November. After the Armistice of November 11, 1918 ended the war, Parker joined the American Expeditionary Forces staff during the early stages of the Occupation of the Rhineland. He served on the AEF staff in Belgium, Luxembourg, France, and Germany before returning to the United States in June 1919. In August 1919, he returned to his regular rank of lieutenant colonel.

From August 1919 to July 1920, Parker attended the United States Army War College. He was than promoted to the regular rank of colonel and assigned to temporary duty with the 7th Cavalry Regiment at Fort Bliss, Texas. From September 1920 to January 1921, he commanded the 1st Cavalry Regiment at Camp Harry J. Jones, Arizona. From January to August 1921, Parker was assigned to Camp Grant, Illinois as chief of staff for the 6th Division. In August and September 1921, he served as plans, operations, and training officer (G-3) for the Sixth Corps Area at Fort Sheridan, Illinois. From September 1921 to October 1923, Parker served as US military attaché in Mexico City. From October to December 1923, Parker performed temporary duty in the office of the army's assistant chief of staff for Intelligence (G-2). He was then detailed to the Field Artillery Branch; after completing the course for senior officers at the Field Artillery School, he was assigned to Fort Sam Houston as commander of the 12th Field Artillery Regiment and 1st Field Artillery Brigade.

From November 1924 to December 1925, Parker served with the American-Mexican Claims Commission, a panel that attempted to resolve claims for financial losses incurred during the Mexican Border War and Mexican Revolution. From December 1925 to June 1926, he served in South America with the US mission that arbitrated the Tacna-Arica dispute between Chile and Peru. (Note: In 1936, Parker and several other officers received decorations from the government of Ecuador to recognize their work to resolve the Tacna–Arica dispute. Ecuador had intended to present the medals in 1929, but US law prevented it. Special legislation passed in 1936 permitted them to accept their awards, and Parker received the Order of Abdon Calderón (Second Class).) After returning to the United States, Parker performed temporary duty in the Military Information Division of the War Department. From October 1926 to December 1927 he was assigned as the Sixth Corps Area's inspector general. From December 1927 to December 1928, he served as vice chairman of the American Electoral Mission that oversaw the 1928 Nicaraguan general election, in accordance with the settlement that ended the Nicaraguan Civil War of 1926–1927.

In January 1929, Parker was promoted to temporary brigadier general and assigned as head of the Bureau of Insular Affairs. He served in this position until January 1933, when he returned to his regular rank of colonel, but he continued to act as bureau chief until August 1933. In February 1933, President Herbert Hoover appointed him to the regular grade of brigadier general. He was then assigned to Fort Sam Houston as commander of the 2nd Field Artillery Brigade, which he commanded until May 1934. Parker was then assigned to command the post of Fort Stotsenburg in the Philippines, where he served from June 1934 to May 1936. Upon returning to the United States, he was assigned as commander of the 1st Cavalry Division, which he led until October 1936. He then requested retirement under provisions of a law permitting officers with 40 years of service to retire; his request was approved and he left the army in October, about eight months before he would have reached mandatory retirement at age 64.

== Retirement and death ==
Parker never married and he had no children. In retirement, he was a resident of Charleston, South Carolina. He died in Charleston on 16 May 1966. Parker was buried at Trinity Episcopal Church and Cemetery in Abbeville.

== Awards ==
In addition to his award from Ecuador, Parker's US awards included:

- Spanish War Service Medal (Note: The Spanish War Service Medal was presented to Regular Army and US Volunteer soldiers who served during the Spanish–American War, but did not qualify for the Spanish Campaign Medal. Parker was eligible as a result of his 1898 service in Tampa and Fernandina, Florida and Anniston, Alabama.)
- Army of Cuban Occupation Medal (Note: The Army of Cuban Occupation Medal was awarded to service members who served in Cuba between 18 July 1898 and 20 May 1902. Parker was eligible as a result of his service in Cuba 1899.)
- Philippine Campaign Medal (Note: The Philippine Campaign Medal was awarded to service members between 1899 and 1913. Parker was eligible because of his Philippines service in 1901, 1903 to 1904, and 1910 to 1912.)
- World War I Victory Medal (Note: The World War I Victory Medal was awarded to service members who served between April 1917 and November 1918, or were part of the American Expeditionary Forces in European Russia from 1918 to 1919 or American Expeditionary Force, Siberia from 1918 to 1920. Parker was eligible because of his First World War service in the US and France from 1917 to 1918.)

== Dates of rank ==
- Second Lieutenant, 12 June 1894
- First Lieutenant, 2 March 1899
- Captain, 28 February 1901
- Major, 1 July 1916
- Lieutenant Colonel, 28 July 1917
- Colonel (Temporary), 5 August 1917
- Brigadier General (Temporary), 26 June 1918
- Lieutenant Colonel, 15 August 1919
- Colonel, 1 July 1920
- Brigadier General (Temporary), 6 January 1929
- Colonel, 8 January 1933
- Brigadier General, 1 February 1933
- Brigadier General (Retired), 31 October 1936
