= Otho B. Rosenbaum =

United States Army general (1871–1962)

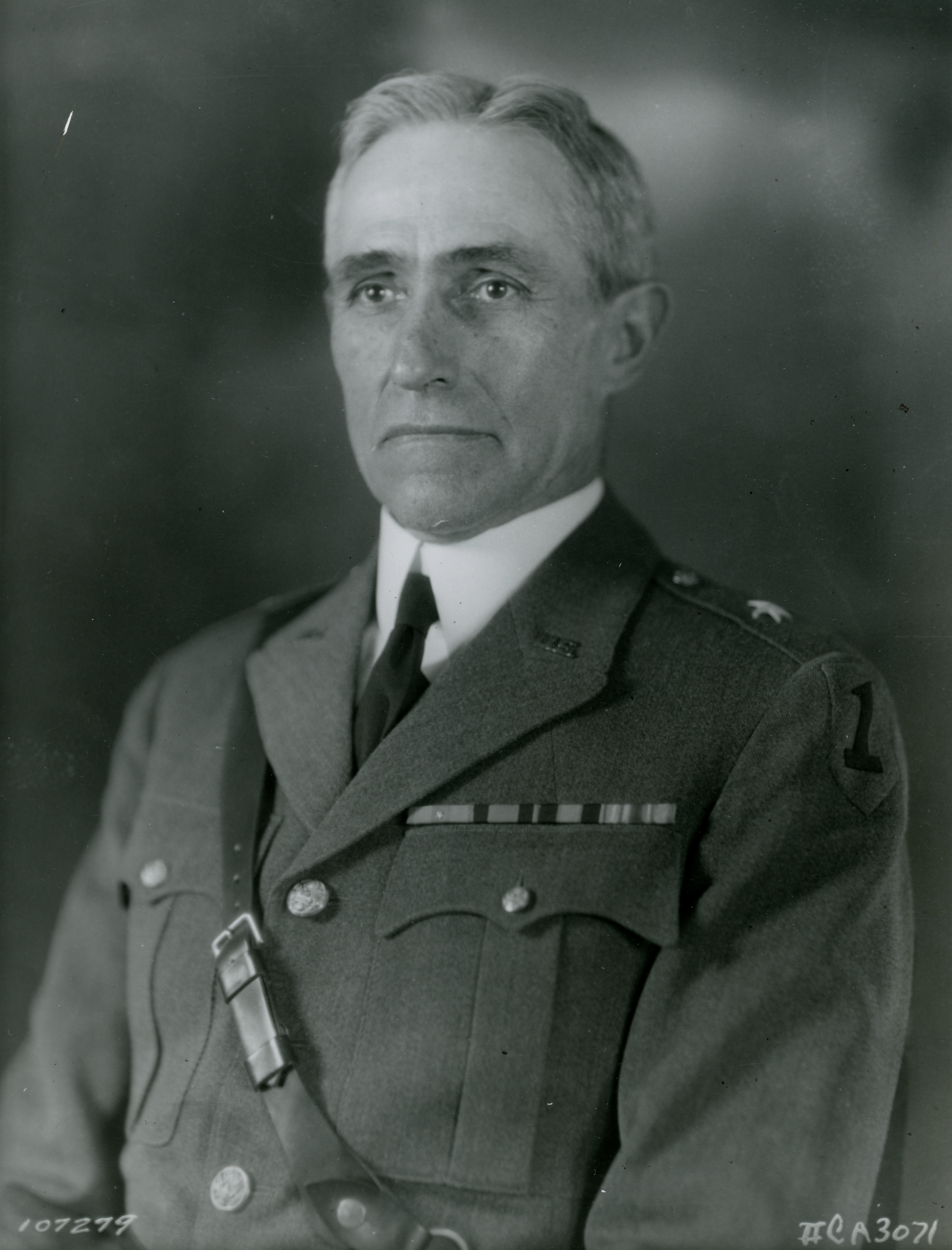
- Rosenbaum as a brigadier general c. March 1928
- Born: February 26, 1871; Marion, Virginia, U.S.
- Died: December 21, 1962 (aged 91); Washington, District of Columbia, U.S.
- Burial place: Arlington National Cemetery
- Alma mater: United States Military Academy; United States Army Command and General Staff College; United States Army War College
- Spouse: Katherine Marie Rawolle (m. 1895–1932)
- Children: 4
- Military career
- Service: United States Army
- Service years: 1894–1935
- Rank: Brigadier General
- Service number: 0–355
- Unit: U.S. Army Infantry Branch
- Commands: Company I, 2nd Infantry Regiment; 2nd Battalion, 2nd Infantry Regiment; 315th Infantry Regiment; 158th Infantry Brigade; 173rd Infantry Brigade; 155th Infantry Brigade; 7th Infantry Regiment; 1st Infantry Brigade; 78th Division; 22nd Infantry Brigade; Hawaiian Division; 3rd Division; Ninth Corps Area
- Wars: Spanish–American War; Philippine–American War; World War I Occupation of the Rhineland
- Awards: Silver Star

Otho Bane Rosenbaum (February 26, 1871 – December 21, 1962) was a career officer in the United States Army. A veteran of the Spanish–American War, Philippine–American War, and World War I, he served from 1894 to 1935, and attained the rank of brigadier general. Rosenbaum's command assignments included the 173rd Infantry Brigade, 155th Infantry Brigade, and 3rd Division, and his awards and decorations included the Silver Star.

A native of Marion, Virginia, Rosenbaum graduated from the United States Military Academy (West Point) in 1894 and began a career in the Infantry. He served in Cuba during the Spanish–American War in 1898 and received the Citation Star for heroism at the Battle of El Caney. When the army created the Silver Star, his Citation Star was converted to the new award. Rosenbaum went on to serve in the Philippines during the Philippine–American War in the early 1900s. As his career progressed, Rosenbaum served with Infantry regiments throughout the United States, frequently in quartermaster, commissary officer, and adjutant posts. During World War I, he commanded first the 315th Infantry Regiment, then several Infantry brigades in succession. He received temporary promotion to brigadier general, and his wartime service included the Battle of Saint-Mihiel, Meuse–Argonne offensive, Lorraine campaign, and Occupation of the Rhineland.

After the First World War, Rosenbaum attended the United States Army Command and General Staff College and United States Army War College, received permanent promotion to brigadier general in 1927, and commanded the 1st Infantry Brigade, 78th Division, 22nd Infantry Brigade, Hawaiian Division, and 3rd Division. He left the army upon reaching the mandatory retirement age of 64 in 1935.

In retirement, Rosenbaum resided in Washington, D.C. and operated two farms in Fairfax County, Virginia. He died in Washington on December 21, 1962 and was buried at Arlington National Cemetery.

== Early life ==
Otho Bane Rosenbaum was born in Marion, Virginia on August 26, 1871, the son of Confederate States Army veteran Thomas M. Rosenbaum and Nannie Virginia (Bane) Rosenbaum. He was raised and educated in Marion, and in 1890 received appointment to the United States Military Academy at West Point from U.S. Representative John A. Buchanan. He graduated in 1894 ranked 36th of 54.

Among Rosenbaum's classmates who also attained general officer rank were Clarence C. Williams, Dwight Edward Aultman, Paul Bernard Malone, Hamilton S. Hawkins III, Frank Sherwood Cocheu, Ora Elmer Hunt, Frank Parker, George Henson Estes, Oliver Edwards, Briant H. Wells, and John William Barker. Among the notable classmates who did not become generals was U.S. Representative Butler Ames, who left the army as a lieutenant colonel. Rosenbaum received his commission as a second lieutenant of Infantry. He was assigned to the 7th Infantry Regiment and posted to Fort Logan, Colorado.

== Start of career ==
Rosenbaum served with his regiment at Fort Logan until April 1898, and he was promoted to first lieutenant the same month. During the Spanish–American War, he served with the 7th Infantry in Cuba, including the Siege of Santiago. In August 1898, he was assigned as regimental quartermaster. Rosenbaum was later awarded the Silver Star to recognize his heroism at the Battle of El Caney.

After returning to the United States in October 1898, he served with his regiment at Fort Wayne, Michigan, where he continued to hold the quartermaster's post. From April 1900 to February 1901, Rosenbaum served as the 7th Infantry's commissary officer.

In February 1901, Rosenbaum was promoted to captain in the 26th Infantry Regiment. During the Philippine–American War, he served with his regiment in the Philippines from April 1901 to July 1903. From October 1901 to April 1902, he was the 26th Infantry's commissary officer, and he was the regimental quartermaster beginning in April 1902. When the regiment returned to the United States in July 1903, it was posted to Fort Sam Houston, Texas, where Rosenbaum continued to serve as quartermaster until December 1905. In April 1906, he left the 26th Infantry for duty as professor of military science and tactics at West Texas Military Academy.

== Continued career ==
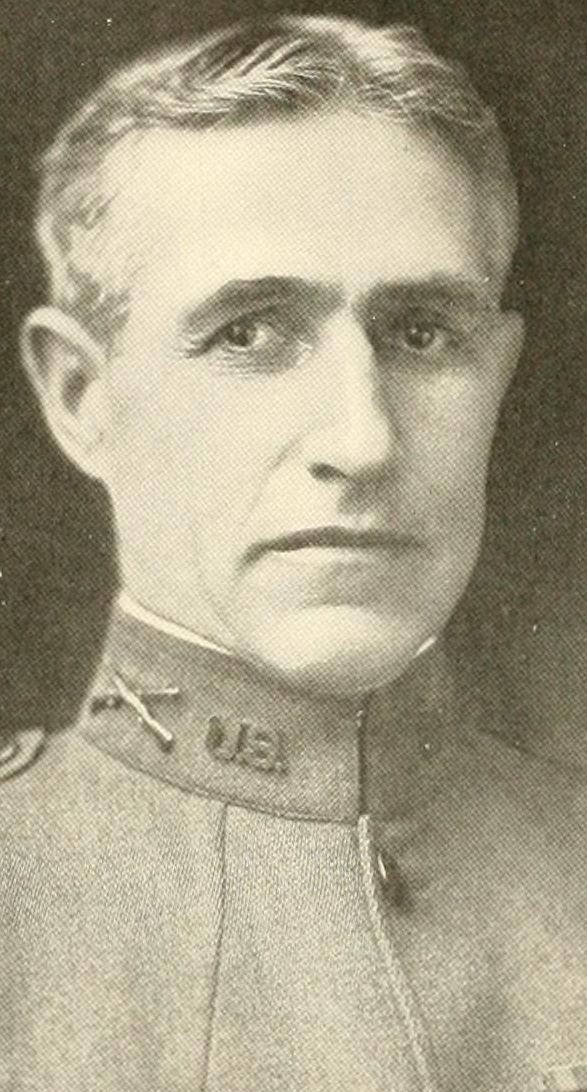
Rosenbaum as commander of the 315th Infantry Regiment c. 1918

In June 1909, Rosenbaum returned to duty with the 26th Infantry at Fort Wayne, Michigan, and he was assigned as the regimental adjutant. In September 1912, he transferred to the 24th Infantry Regiment, but the following month he was assigned to the 2nd Infantry Regiment. He served with the 2nd Infantry at Fort Shafter, Hawaii from November 1912 to April 1917, including assignment as commander of Company I, in addition to a posting as regimental quartermaster from May 1914 to November 1915. Rosenbaum was promoted to major in July 1916, after which he commanded the 2nd Infantry's 2nd Battalion.

With the army expanding after U.S. entry into World War I, Rosenbaum served in the office of the Office of the Inspector General of the United States Army from May to August 1917. In August, he was promoted to temporary colonel and assigned to command the 315th Infantry Regiment, a unit of the 79th Division's 158th Infantry Brigade. He commanded the 315th during its organization and training at Fort Meade, Maryland until July 1918. In June 1918, he received promotion to permanent lieutenant colonel and temporary brigadier general, and in July he assumed command of the 158th Infantry Brigade. In late July, he was reassigned to command of the 173rd Infantry Brigade, a unit of the 87th Division.

After arriving in France, Rosenbaum was reassigned again in September, this time to command of the 155th Infantry Brigade, a subordinate unit of the 78th Division. He led this brigade through the end of the war, including the Battle of Saint-Mihiel, Meuse–Argonne offensive, and Lorraine campaign. After the Armistice of November 11, 1918, Rosenbaum led the 155th Infantry Brigade during the Occupation of the Rhineland. He remained in command after the brigade returned to the United States, and led it until demobilization at Fort Gordon, Georgia in August 1919. After demobilization, Rosenbaum was reduced to his permanent rank of lieutenant colonel and was assigned as deputy commandant of the United States Disciplinary Barracks at Fort Leavenworth, Kansas. He served until November 1920, and he served simultaneously as the adjutant beginning in January 1920. He was promoted to colonel in July 1920.

== Later career ==
From November 1920 to August 1921, Rosenbaum commanded the 7th Infantry Regiment at Camp Pike, Arkansas. From August 1921 to June 1922, he attended the Army School of the Line at Fort Leavenworth, which he completed as an Honor Graduate. He then began attendance at the United States Army Command and General Staff College, from which he graduated in June 1923. After serving as an instructor for Organized Reserve Corps officers at Fort Devens, Massachusetts in the summer of 1923, in August he was assigned as a student at the United States Army War College, and he graduated in June 1924.

After his war college graduation, Rosenbaum served on the War Department General Staff from July 1924 to November 1927. In November 1927, he was promoted to brigadier general. In November and December 1927 he attended the refresher course for officers at the Langley Field, Virginia Air Corps Tactical School. In January 1928, he was a student in the refresher course for officers at the Fort Benning, Georgia Infantry School. In February 1928, he was assigned to command of the 1st Infantry Brigade at Fort Wadsworth, New York. In November 1929, Rosenbaum was also assigned to command the 78th Division, an Organized Reserve Corps unit based in Newark, New Jersey.

From February 1931 to September 1933, Rosenbaum commanded the 22nd Infantry Brigade, a unit of the Hawaiian Division. In September and October 1931, he acted as commander of the Hawaiian Division. From February 1934 to August 1935, Rosenbaum commanded the 3rd Division at Fort Lewis, Washington. In February and March 1935, he performed additional duty as commander of the Ninth Corps Area. Rosenbaum left the army upon reaching the mandatory retirement age of 64 in August 1935.

== Retirement and death ==
After retiring, Rosenbaum owned and operated two farms in Fairfax County, Virginia, a dairy farm and a cattle and poultry farm. He resided in Washington, D.C., where he died on December 21, 1962. He was buried at Arlington National Cemetery.

== Family ==
In August 1895, Rosenbaum married Katherine Marie Rawolle, the daughter of an army officer. They were the parents of four children, two of whom lived to adulthood, one of whom died as an infant in 1915, and one of whom died in 1922 at age 13. Rosenbaum's son Frederick died at age 56 in 1953 and his daughter Elizabeth died in January 1962 at age 64.

Some sources indicate that Rosenbaum was Jewish, including lists of Jewish Spanish–American War veterans. However, Rosenbaum's parents were buried in a Lutheran cemetery in Marion, Virginia, and contemporary biographies also indicate that Rosenbaum stated his religious preference as Lutheran.
