= Oliver Edwards (United States Army officer) =

United States Army general

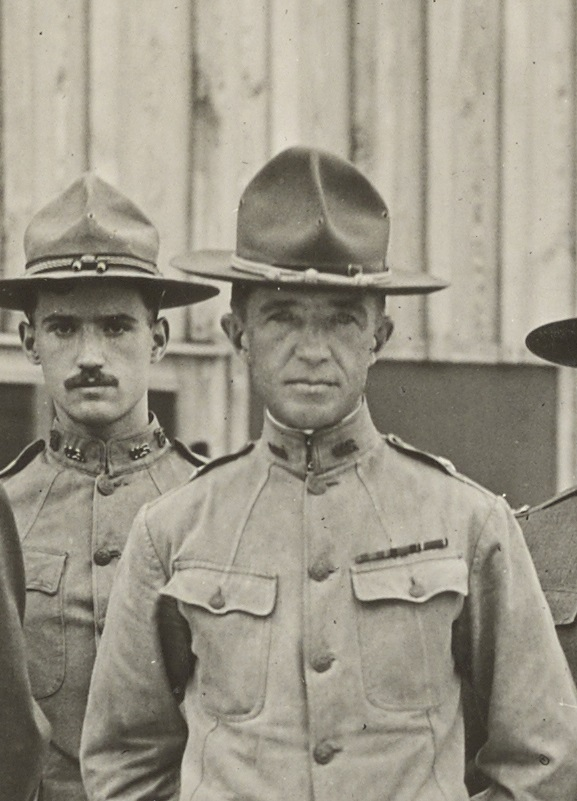
- Brig. gen. Oliver Edwards as commander of Camp Hancock in September 1918
- Born: December 2, 1871; Chesterfield, Massachusetts, US
- Died: February 25, 1921 (aged 49); Washington, D.C., US
- Spouse: Geraldine Wessels
- Children: 3
- Military career
- Allegiance: United States
- Branch: United States Army
- Service years: 1894–1921
- Rank: Brigadier general
- Conflicts: Spanish–American War; Philippine–American War; Second Occupation of Cuba; World War I
- Awards: Distinguished Service Medal

Oliver Edwards (December 2, 1871 – February 25, 1921) was a United States Army officer in the late 19th and early 20th centuries. He served in several conflicts, including the Spanish–American War and World War I, and he received the Distinguished Service Medal for his efforts in the latter conflict.

== Biography ==
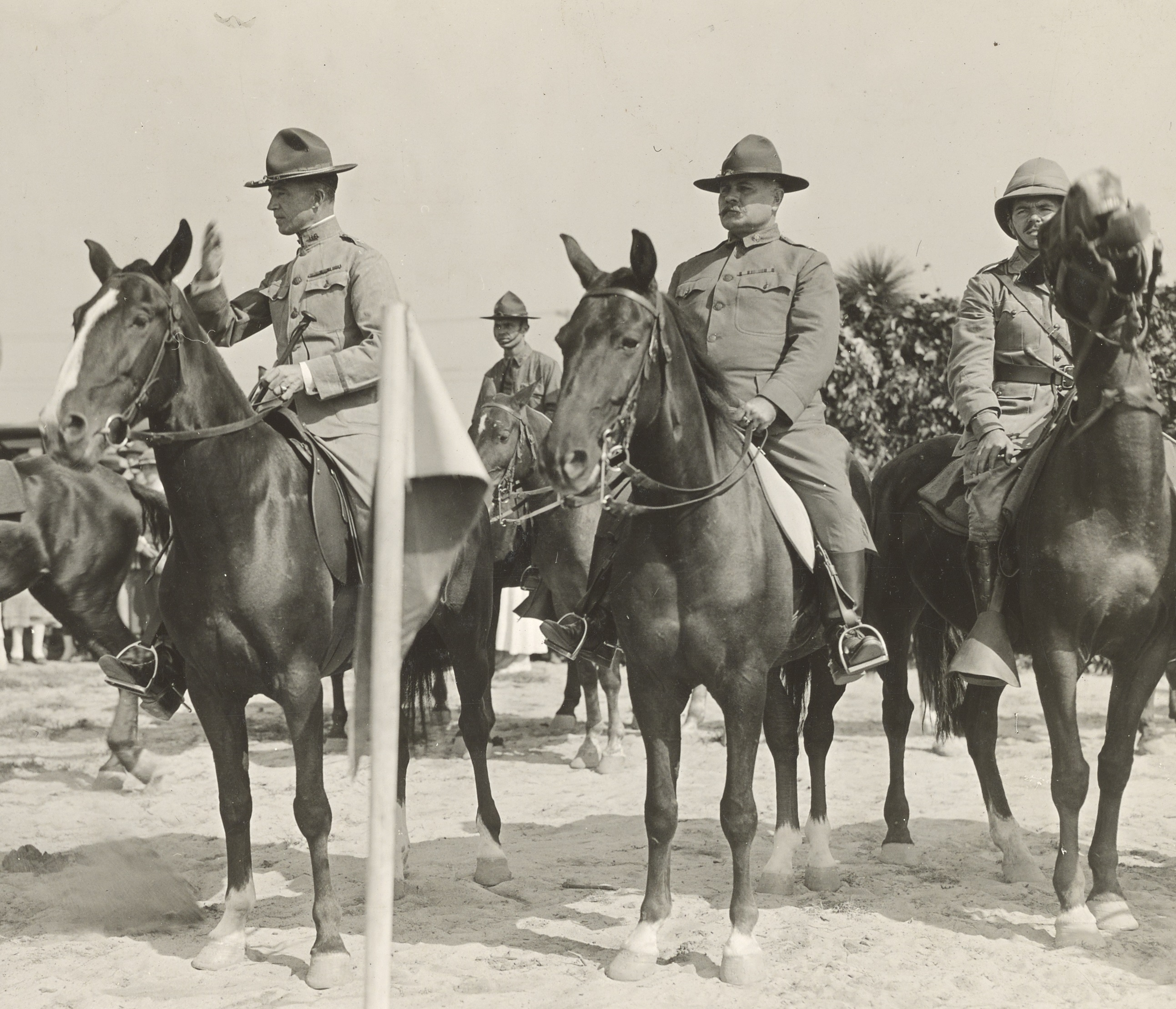
Brigadier General Edwards, left, reviewing students of the Machine Gun School at Camp Hancock in September 1918.

Edwards was born in Chesterfield, Massachusetts, on December 2, 1871. He graduated 40th in a class of 54 from the United States Military Academy (USMA), from which he entered in June 1890, in 1894 and was commissioned into the 11th Infantry Regiment. Many of his classmates at the academy became general officers before, during, or after World War I. These included Butler Ames, George H. Estes, Hamilton S. Hawkins III, Samuel Hof, Ora E. Hunt, John W. Joyes, Paul B. Malone, Francis L. Parker, Frank Parker, George Vidmer, Briant H. Wells, Pegram Whitworth and Clarence C. Williams.

After serving in the 11th Infantry, Edwards served, in succeeding order, in the 6th, 28th, 23rd, and 5th Infantry Regiments. Edwards served in the Puerto Rican Campaign during the Spanish–American War. After serving as an aide-de-camp to Jacob H. Smith during the Philippine–American War, he participated in the Second Occupation of Cuba between 1906 and 1909. Edwards became a distinguished graduate of the Army School of the Line in 1910, and he graduated from the Army Staff College the following year. After serving as an instructor for the college, Edwards left in 1912 to teach a course for the French Army. After returning, he served in Panama as an intelligence officer and chief of staff.

Edwards was promoted to the rank of brigadier general on August 8, 1918. He went to France because of World War I and organized and commanded the Machine Gun Training Center, receiving the Army Distinguished Service Medal for his work. The model's citation reads as follows:

The President of the United States of America, authorized by Act of Congress, July 9, 1918, takes pleasure in presenting the Army Distinguished Service Medal to Brigadier General Oliver Edwards, United States Army, for exceptionally meritorious and distinguished services to the Government of the United States, in a duty of great responsibility during World War I. Due to his rare ability and high professional attainments, General Edwards was selected to organize the Machine-Gun Training Center, the success of which was, in a large measure, due to his zealous and energetic administration.

With the war over, and after returning to the U.S., Edwards reverted to his permanent rank of colonel and became a student at the General Staff College. He also worked in the intelligence division of the United States Department of War's general staff.

Edwards died, at the young age of 51, on February 25, 1921.

== Bibliography ==
- Davis, Henry Blaine Jr. (1998). Generals in Khaki. Raleigh, North Carolina: Pentland Press. ISBN 1571970886. OCLC 40298151.
