= Samuel Hof =

United States Army general

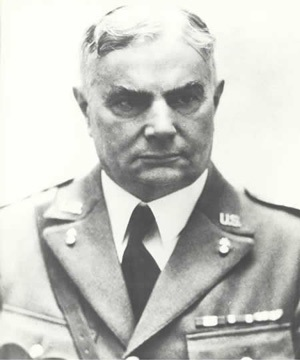
- Born: October 24, 1870; Boscobel, Wisconsin, U.S.
- Died: March 10, 1937 (aged 66); Washington, D.C., U.S.
- Military career
- Allegiance: United States of America
- Branch: United States Army
- Service years: 1894–1934
- Rank: Major General
- Commands: 13th Chief of Ordnance (1930-1934)
- Conflicts: Spanish–American War; World War I
- Awards: Distinguished Service Medal; Spanish War Service Medal; World War I Victory Medal

Samuel Hof (October 24, 1870 – March 10, 1937) was an officer in the United States Army during World War I. He was 13th Chief of Ordnance for the U.S. Army Ordnance Corps.

== Biography ==
Samuel Hof was born on October 24, 1870, in Boscobel, Wisconsin, and graduated from West Point in 1894. Some of his classmates also became general officers, including Frank Parker, Hamilton S. Hawkins III, Oliver Edwards, George H. Estes, John W. Joyes, Ora E. Hunt, Pegram Whitworth, William E. Welsh, Briant H. Wells, John F. Preston, Francis L. Parker, Paul B. Malone and George Vidmer.

He was originally commissioned a second lieutenant of cavalry in 1894, but he was later transferred to the Ordnance Corps. For his service as a commanding officer of the Frankford Arsenal during World War I, he was later awarded with the Distinguished Service Medal.

Hof graduated from the United States Army War College in 1921 and earned an MBA from the Harvard Graduate School of Business Administration in 1926. He was promoted to brigadier general in 1927 and major general in 1930.

He was Chief of Ordnance from 1930 to 1934. His four-year term came at the height of the Depression resulting in a significant decrease in funding for the Ordnance Department. Despite these difficulties, there was a general advance in the design and manufacturing of ordnance materiel. He made a number of recommendations for improved efficiencies in the department's supply responsibilities.

Hof moved to Washington, D.C., in 1927 when he became Assistant Chief of Ordnance and retired from the Army in 1934. He died of heart disease on March 10, 1937, in Walter Reed Hospital aged 66. Hof is buried together with his wife Alice Mayo Hof (1873–1962) at West Point Cemetery.

== Distinguished Service Medal citation ==
His award citation reads:

The President of the United States of America, authorized by Act of Congress, July 9, 1918, takes pleasure in presenting the Army Distinguished Service Medal to Colonel (Ordnance Corps) Samuel Hof, United States Army, for exceptionally meritorious and distinguished service in positions of great responsibility first as commanding officer, Frankford Arsenal from March 1918 to March 1919, where, by his indefatigable energy, outstanding administrative ability, and thorough technical knowledge, he brought to a successful production, basic tracer, incendiary, and armor-piercing small-arms ammunition, and supplied substantially all that was used by our troops; later as acting chairman of the ordnance claims board, where, by his energy, tact and business ability, he secured the settlement of outstanding obligations and later as chief of field service, ordnance department, where he perfected the organization and controlled the disposition of vast quantities of materials and plants left over from the war.

Military offices
Preceded by Major General Clarence C. Williams	Chief of Ordnance of the United States Army; 1930–1934	Succeeded by Major General William H. Tschappat
