= Briant H. Wells =

U.S. Army Major General

Briant Harris Wells
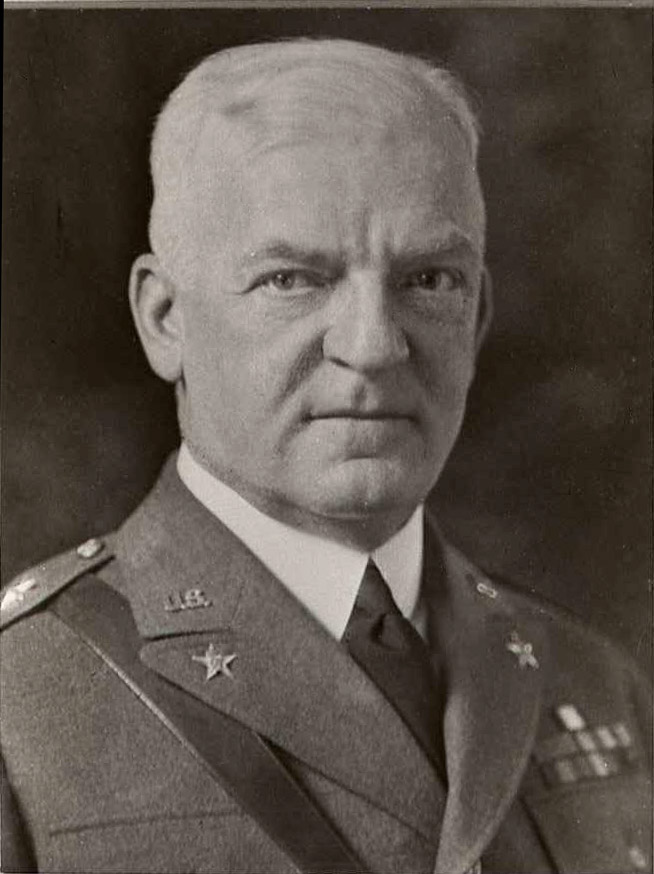
- Born: December 5, 1871; Salt Lake City, Utah Territory, United States
- Died: June 10, 1949 (aged 77); Long Beach, California, United States
- Burial place: Arlington National Cemetery, Virginia, United States
- Relatives: Daniel H. Wells (father); Heber M. Wells (brother)
- Military career
- Allegiance: United States
- Branch: United States Army
- Service years: 1894–1935
- Rank: Major general
- Unit: Infantry Branch
- Commands: Hawaiian Department; Hawaiian Division; 1st Division; United States Army Infantry School; 318th Regiment
- Conflicts: Spanish–American War: Battle of San Juan Hill; Philippine–American War; Pancho Villa Expedition; World War I: Battle of Saint-Mihiel; Meuse–Argonne offensive
- Awards: Army Distinguished Service Medal; Silver Star; Purple Heart; Legion of Honour

Major General Briant Harris Wells (December 5, 1871 – June 10, 1949) was a highly decorated officer in the United States Army. A veteran of the Spanish–American and Philippine–American Wars, he later distinguished himself as chief of staff of the IV Corps during the final days of World War I, for which he received the Army Distinguished Service Medal.

He later served in various important assignments, including as Deputy Chief of Staff of the United States Army and commanding general of the 1st Infantry Division and the Hawaiian Department.

== Early career ==
Wells was born on December 5, 1871, in Salt Lake City, Utah Territory, as the son of Daniel H. Wells and Martha Givens Harris. His father was a mayor of Salt Lake City and an apostle of the Church of Jesus Christ of Latter-day Saints (LDS). Briant had a total of thirty-seven siblings due to his father's LDS religion, which allowed Polygamy. Some of his siblings had also distinguished careers later: Heber M. Wells, first Governor of the State of Utah; Annie Wells Cannon, a prominent women's suffragist or Rulon S. Wells, a Utah politician. His father was also head of the Nauvoo Legion (the name given to the predecessor of the Utah National Guard during the early period of Utah Territory).

In May 1890, Wells received an appointment to the United States Military Academy at West Point, New York, where he graduated four years later with Bachelor of Science degree. Many of his classmates became general officers later including: Butler Ames, George H. Estes, Hamilton S. Hawkins III, Samuel Hof, Ora E. Hunt, John W. Joyes, Francis L. Parker, Frank Parker, Paul B. Malone, George Vidmer, Pegram Whitworth or Clarence C. Williams.

Following his graduation, Wells was commissioned second lieutenant in the Infantry Branch on June 12, 1894, and ordered to Fort Omaha, Nebraska, where he joined 2nd Infantry Regiment. He served with the regiment in Department of the Platte until June 1896, before his unit was transferred to the Department of Dakota.

He then served as an instructor with the Utah Army National Guard from August 1897 until the beginning of Spanish–American War, when he was promoted to first lieutenant and appointed a quartermaster, commissary, and mustering officer of the Utah Volunteers. Wells was then transferred to the 18th Infantry Regiment and embarked for Cuba in June that year. He participated in the Battle of San Juan Hill on July 1, 1898, and was wounded while leading a charge. Wells spent a month in the hospital and received Silver Star for gallantry and efficiency under fire.

Upon his full recovery, Wells served light duty with Utah Army National Guard and rejoined the 18th Infantry Regiment at Cavite, Philippines as company commander in November 1898. He subsequently participated in the combats against Filipino insurgents on the Island of Panay during Philippine–American War. Wells took part in the captures of Jaro and Iloilo and served in the field until December 1899. He was meanwhile appointed Regimental Commissary in May that year.

While in the Philippines, Wells participated in the Moro Rebellion and was promoted to captain in February 1901. He left for the United States in June that year and following a leave at home, he was assigned to the 29th Infantry Regiment at Fort Sheridan, Illinois. His regiment served within the Department of the Lakes until February 1902, when it was ordered for occupation duty to the Philippines.

During his second tour in that country, Wells was stationed in the Southern Philippines and in the Islands of Visayas until May 1904, when he was ordered back to the United States. He then served a tour of duty with the Department of the Colorado, before he rejoined his regiment in Luzon, Philippines in August 1907.

In August 1909, Wells returned stateside and joined the headquarters of the Department of the East at Fort Jay, Governors Island, New York City. He consecutively served as quartermaster under Majod Generals Leonard Wood, Frederick D. Grant and Tasker H. Bliss until December 1912, when he rejoined his old outfit, the 29th Infantry Regiment, as constructing and regimental quartermaster. Wells sailed with the regiment to the Panama Canal Zone in March 1915 and served as company and battalion commander and as adjutant and again as quartermaster of the regiment.

== World War I ==
Following his return stateside in May 1916, Wells was requested by his former superior officer, Major General Wood, for duty as an instructor at the Citizens' Military Training Camp, the first businessmen's training camp at Plattsburgh, New York. While in this capacity, he was promoted to major in July 1916 and left for Washington, D.C. one month later. Wells then served briefly with the Office of the Chief of the General Staff of the United States Army, before he was ordered to the Mexican border, where he assumed duty as chief of staff, 16th Provisional Division and Nogales District during the Pancho Villa Expedition.

He was ordered to Douglas, Arizona, in April 1917, the same month of the American entry into World War I, and served as chief of staff, 3rd Provisional Division, before returning to Washington, D.C. a month later. Wells then served as a member of the War Department General Staff under another former superior, Major General Tasker H. Bliss, until August that year, when he was promoted to the temporary rank of colonel.

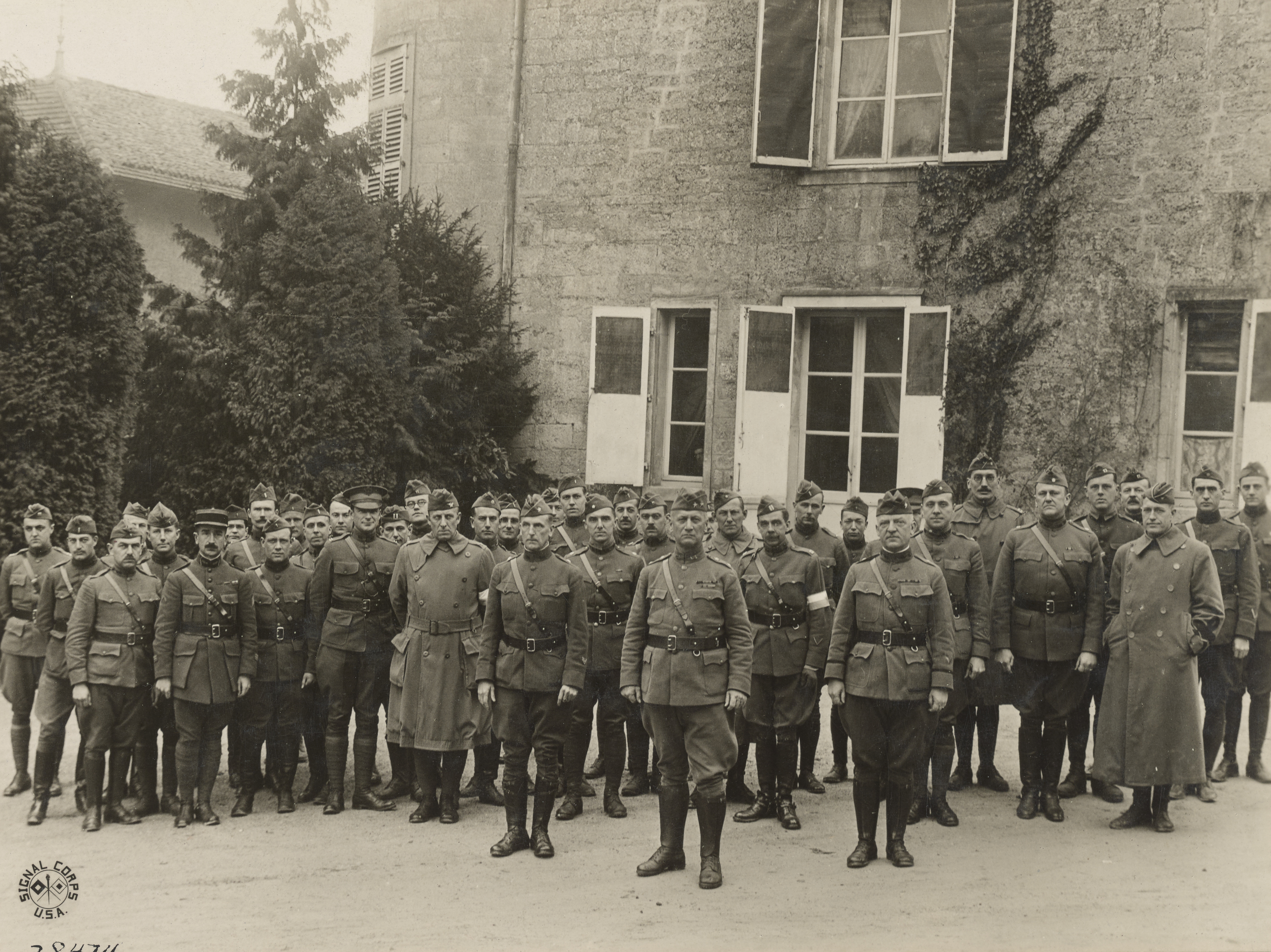
Major General Charles Henry Muir, the newly appointed commander of U.S. IV Corps, pictured here with his staff at Boucq, Meuse, France, October 31, 1918. Stood to Muir's left is his chief of staff, Brigadier General Briant H. Wells while Joseph Stilwell, then a major, stands to his right in the rank behind.

Wells was subsequently ordered to Camp Lee, Virginia, where he was tasked with the formation and training of the 318th Infantry Regiment, part of the 159th Brigade of the 80th Division. He commanded the regiment until December, when he was attached to the Office of the Chief of the General Staff of the United States Army, and again serving with Bliss, now a full general.

Bliss also served as an American Permanent Military Representative at the Supreme War Council in Versailles, France and Wells followed him there in January 1918. Wells served as representative of General Bliss at Headquarters, General-in-Chief, Allied Armies until the end of July 1918, when he was appointed chief of staff of the newly activated VI Corps under Major General Omar Bundy.

Wells was promoted to the temporary rank of brigadier general on August 8, 1918, and participated in the Battle of Saint-Mihiel in mid-September. He was transferred in the same capacity with IV Corps under Major General Charles H. Muir in October 1918 and participated in the Meuse–Argonne offensive. The Armistice with Germany brought an end to hostilities soon afterwards.

For his service during World War I, Wells was decorated with the Army Distinguished Service Medal as well as the Legion of Honour, rank Officer by the Government of France. The citation for his Army DSM reads as follows:

The President of the United States of America, authorized by Act of Congress, July 9, 1918, takes pleasure in presenting the Army Distinguished Service Medal to Brigadier General Briant Harris Wells, United States Army, for exceptionally meritorious and distinguished services to the Government of the United States, in a duty of great responsibility during World War I. As Chief of Staff of the 4th Army Corps while it was in the front line in the Woevre, General Wells displayed military attainments of a high order in the planning of operations. Both then and subsequently, during the march to the Rhine and the occupation of German territory, his service was marked by tireless zeal, excellent judgment, and whole-hearted devotion to the performance of important tasks.

== Postwar service ==
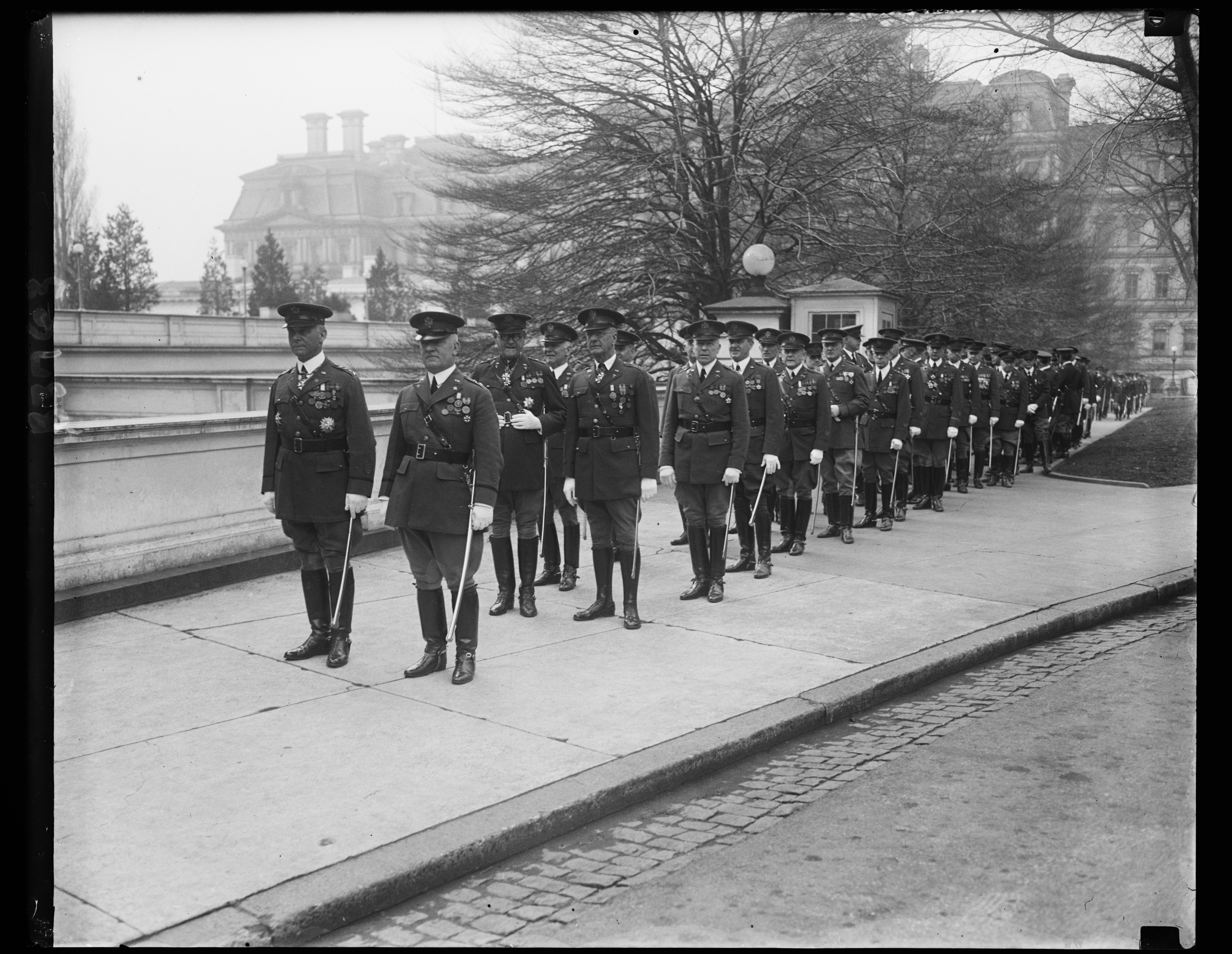
Officers of the United States Army arriving at the White House for the annual New Year's Reception. Wells is on the right in the lead with General Charles P. Summerall, Army Chief of Staff, on the left.

Following the Armistice, Wells remained with IV Corps, now under Major General Charles P. Summerall and took part in the occupation of the Rhineland. He was stationed in the area west of Coblenz until mid-May 1919, when the Corps was demobilized and its unit ordered back to the United States.

Wells reverted to the peacetime rank of lieutenant colonel in July 1919 and assumed duty with the War Plans and Defense Projects Section, War Plans Division, War Department General Staff. While in this capacity, he was promoted to colonel on July 1, 1920, and was appointed Chief of War Plans and Defense Projects Section. Upon the appointment of General John J. Pershing as Chief of Staff of the Army in July 1921, Wells was promoted to the capacity of assistant chief of staff, War Plans Division, within the War Department General Staff and reached again the rank of brigadier general on December 4, 1922.

In November 1923, Wells was ordered to Fort Benning, Georgia, for duty as commandant of the Army Infantry School. He served in this capacity until March 1926, when he was recalled to the War Department General Staff and assumed duty as assistant chief of staff for logistics (G-4). Wells served in this capacity under Major General John L. Hines and upon the arrival of new chief of staff, General Charles P. Summerall, who served as Wells' superior officer during the occupation duty in Germany, he was appointed deputy chief of staff in May 1927. He was promoted to major general on April 19, 1928.

Wells served de facto as the second man of the War Department General Staff until March 1930, when he was ordered to Fort Hamilton, New York City, and assumed duty as commanding general, 1st Infantry Division. This assignment was brief and Wells sailed for Hawaii in September that year, where he assumed duty as commanding general, Hawaiian Division.

In September 1931, Wells assumed command of the Hawaiian Department and was responsible for the complete defense of Hawaii. His command consisted of Hawaiian Division, which he recently commanded; Separate Coast Artillery Brigade and 18th Composite Wing. Wells also completely revised the war plans for the defense of the Islands, opened up many miles of military trails and roads in the mountains, greatly improved housing and tightened up in many ways on officer requirements, both professionally and physically. He held that command until the end of September 1934, when he was ordered stateside for pending retirement.

== Retirement and final years ==
Wells retired from active service on January 31, 1935, and returned to Hawaii, where he found a new home. He settled in Honolulu and became the first president of the Honolulu Community Theatre. He then served as executive vice president and secretary, Hawaiian Sugar Planters' Association until June 1944. In addition to his job, he was a member of Honolulu Chapter of the Red Cross; of the Hawaiian Historical Society, of the Social Science Club, the Oahu Country Club and the Pacific Club.

As the official of the Hawaiian Islands Protective association, General Wells was also a proponent that Hawaii's 148,000 residents of Japanese origin will remain loyal to the United States in case of a war in the Pacific area.

In June 1949, while en route to his USMA class reunion, Wells died on June 10, 1949, in Long Beach, California. He was buried with full military honors at Arlington National Cemetery, Virginia and honorary pallbearers were West Point classmates and men with whom Wells served for more than forty years in the Army. They included General George C. Marshall, former secretary of State and World War II Chief of Staff; General Omar Bradley, then-Army Chief of Staff; General Charles Pelot Summerall, former chief of staff, under whom Wells served as his deputy in 1927–1930, and R. G. Bell of Honolulu, president of the Hawaiian Sugar Planters Association.

His wife, Mary Jane Jennings (1877–1959) is buried beside him. They had together three children: sons Briant Jr. and Thomas J., both decorated Army Colonels and USMA graduates and daughter Mary Jane.

== Decorations ==
Here is Major General Wells' ribbon bar:

1st Row	Army Distinguished Service Medal	Silver Star	Purple Heart
2nd Row	Spanish Campaign Medal	Philippine Campaign Medal	Mexican Border Service Medal
3rd Row	World War I Victory Medal with two Battle Clasps	Army of Occupation of Germany Medal	Legion of Honour, rank Officer

Military offices
Preceded by William Lassiter	Commanding General Hawaiian Department; 1931−1934	Succeeded by Halstead Dorey
Preceded by Edwin B. Winans	Commanding General Hawaiian Division; 1930−1931	Succeeded by Otho B. Rosenbaum
Preceded by William P. Jackson	Commanding General 1st Division; March−September 1930	Succeeded by William P. Jackson
Preceded by Walter H. Gordon	Commandant of the United States Army Infantry School; 1923−1926	Succeeded by Edgar T. Collins
