= Michael Bedenbaugh =

American historic preservationist

Personal details
- Party: Alliance
- Profession: Real estate

Michael Bedenbaugh is an American historical preservationist known for preserving South Carolina's historical landmarks including Trinity Episcopal Church, buildings in Society Hill community of Darlington County and Wilkins House. He received the Order of the Palmetto by Governor Henry McMaster in 2021.

== Education ==
He earned a degree in International Studies focusing on Russian studies and History from University of South Carolina in 1990, and studied at Columbia University during his senior year.

== Career ==
Bedenbaugh served as president and CEO of Preservation SC, a nonprofit organization preserving historic properties in South Carolina, from 2007 to 2022. He implemented programs and raised over $3 million for preservation projects, generating over $2 million in operating revenue.

During his career, Bedenbaugh's advocacy and behind the scenes negotiations helped ensure the conversion of the Palmetto Compress near the University of South Carolina into off-campus student housing, and the Curtiss-Wright Hangar at Columbia's L.B. Owens Airport transformation into a bustling brewery and restaurant. Bedenbaugh led the effort to preserve Trinity Episcopal Church in 2019, and applied for a $250,000 national preservation grant from the National Fund for Sacred Places. In 2020, he negotiated the donation of the vacant Plantation House hotel in Edgefield with the desire to revitalize the 30,000-square-foot historic building by finding qualified investors and entrepreneurs to refurbish it.

For his work, he received the Order of the Palmetto from Governor Henry McMaster in 2021.

== 2024 US House election ==
In January 2024, Bedenbaugh announced his candidacy to represent South Carolina's 3rd congressional district in the United States House of Representatives, being vacated by Jeff Duncan. He was the Alliance Party nominee. Bedenbaugh was defeated by Republican nominee Sheri Biggs.
