= 1st Brigade Combat Team, 1st Infantry Division =

One of two basic maneuver units of the 1st Infantry Division, US Army

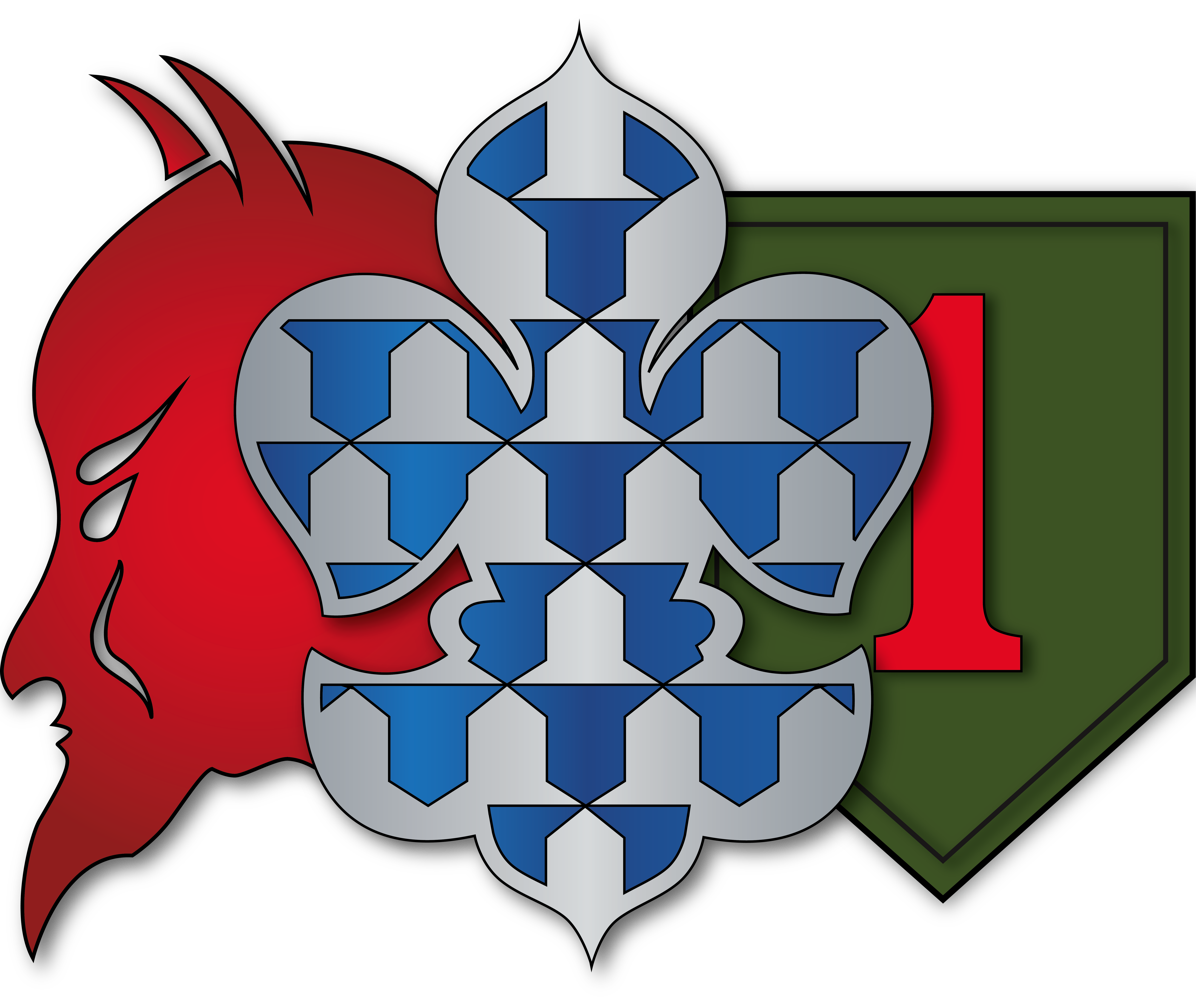
- 1st Brigade Combat Team, 1st Infantry Division's insignia
- Active: 1917-1939; 1942-1943; 1958-1962; 1964-Present
- Branch: Regular Army
- Type: Brigade combat team
- Role: Infantry
- Garrison/HQ: Fort Riley
- Nickname: "Devil's Brigade"
- Motto: Duty First
- Mascot: Devil
- Engagements: World War I Vietnam War; Persian Gulf War: Operation Desert Shield; Operation Desert Storm; Iraq War: Operation Iraqi Freedom

Commanders
- Current commander: Colonel Ian Lauer

The 1st Armored Brigade Combat Team, 1st Infantry Division (aka, "Devil Brigade") is a maneuver brigade combat team (BCT) in the United States Army. It is the oldest permanent brigade in the Army and has some of the oldest units in the United States Army. Headquarters and Headquarters Company (HHC), 1st Brigade served in World War I, Vietnam, Desert Shield and Desert Storm. Its most notable campaigns include the Aisne-Marne, Meuse-Argonne, Picardy, Tet Counteroffensive and the Liberation and Defense of Kuwait. Since Desert Storm, the "Devil Brigade" has deployed to Bosnia, Kuwait, and to Korea to participate in a 2nd Infantry Division exercise.

== History ==
=== World War I ===
Headquarters and Headquarters Company was constituted 24 May 1917 into the Regular Army as Headquarters, 1st Brigade, an element of the 1st Expeditionary Division (later redesignated as the 1st Infantry Division).

- 1st Infantry Brigade
  - 16th Infantry Regiment
  - 18th Infantry Regiment
  - 2nd Machine Gun Battalion

==== Commanders 1st Infantry Brigade ====
- 1917
1. 9 June Colonel Omar Bundy
2. 28 June Brigadier General Omar Bundy
3. 25 August Colonel Ulysses G. McAlexander (ad interim)
4. 30 August Brigadier General Omar Bundy
5. 8 September Brigadier General George B. Duncan
- 1918
1. 16 January Colonel John L. Hines (ad interim)
2. 21 January Brigadier General George B. Duncan
3. 5 May Brigadier General John L. Hines
4. 27 August Brigadier General Frank Parker
5. 18 October Colonel Hjalmar Erickson (ad interim)
6. 21 November Brigadier General Frank Parker
7. 20 December Colonel Charles A. Hunt (ad interim)
- 1919
1. 5 January Brigadier General Frank Parker
2. 12 January Colonel Charles A. Hunt (ad interim)
3. 17 January Brigadier General Frank Parker
4. 27 January Colonel William F. Harrell (ad interim)
5. 29 January Brigadier General Frank Parker
6. 16 February Colonel Charles A. Hunt (ad interim)
7. 29 March Brigadier General Frank Parker
8. 1 April Colonel Charles A. Hunt (ad interim)
9. 11 April Brigadier General Frank Parker
10. 25 April Colonel Charles A. Hunt (ad interim)
11. 7 May Lieutenant Colonel Edward R. Coppock (ad interim)
12. 9 May Lieutenant Colonel William F. Hoey (ad interim)
13. 13 May Brigadier General Frank Parker
14. 8 July Colonel William W. McCammon (ad Interim)
15. 18 July Brigadier General Frank Parker
16. 21 July Colonel William W. McCammon (ad interim)
17. 24 July to 3 September Brigadier General Frank Parker

=== Interwar period ===
The 1st Infantry Brigade arrived at the port of New York on the USS Mobile on 3 September 1919 after nine months of occupation duty near Coblenz, Germany. It participated in the 1st Division victory parade down 5th Avenue in New York City on 10 September 1919, and in Washington, D.C., on 17 September 1919. It was temporarily posted to Camp George G. Meade, Maryland, where emergency period personnel were discharged from the service. It was transferred to Camp Zachary Taylor, Kentucky, and arrived there on 4 October 1919. Transferred in September 1920 to Camp Dix, New Jersey. The Headquarters and Headquarters Company were transferred on 19 September 1922 to Fort Wadsworth, New York, with subordinate regiments transferred to posts in the New York City area. The entire brigade participated in the 1st Division parade down 5th Avenue in New York City on 3 October 1924 during the massive reunion of the Society of the 1st Division. Redesignated HHC, 1st Brigade on 23 March 1925. Headquarters transferred to 39 Whitehall Street, New York City, on 10 October 1931. Concurrently, the HQ Company was transferred to Fort Jay, New York. HQ Company was transferred several more times in the 1930s: to 39 Whitehall Street on 13 February 1934; to Miller Field, on 31 August 1935; and back to Fort Wadsworth on 3 January 1938. The Headquarters was transferred on 8 April 1933 to Fort Dix, to assume command and control of the Southern Civilian Conservation Corps (CCC) District, Second Corps Area. As such, the brigade and subordinate units controlled CCC activities in New Jersey and Delaware. The Headquarters performed that mission until 30 October 1934, but remained at Camp Dix until 29 August 1935, when it returned to 39 Whitehall Street. Redesignated HHC, 1st Infantry Brigade on 24 August 1936. Headquarters transferred on 21 April 1938 back to Fort Wadsworth. Typically, each May, brigade units road marched from home stations to Camp Dix, and provided training assistance during the summer to the Citizens' Military Training Camp (CMTC) and the Reserve Officers’ Training Corps (ROTC) camps, and to infantry elements of the 77th and 78th Divisions. Subordinate regiments usually held marksmanship and tactical training in late summer and early fall at Camp Dix before marching back to their home stations.

=== World War II ===
When the 1st Division was converted to a triangular division, the brigade headquarters and headquarters company was disbanded on 11 October 1939 and personnel were transferred to the Infantry Section, Headquarters, 1st Division, the 1st Division Headquarters and Military Police Company, or to the 18th Infantry. The brigade was reconstituted in the Regular Army on 1 July 1943 as the 1st Airborne Infantry Brigade and activated on 6 July 1943 at Camp Meade, South Dakota. The brigade later moved to Camp Mackall, North Carolina, where it was disbanded on 27 January 1944.

=== Cold War ===
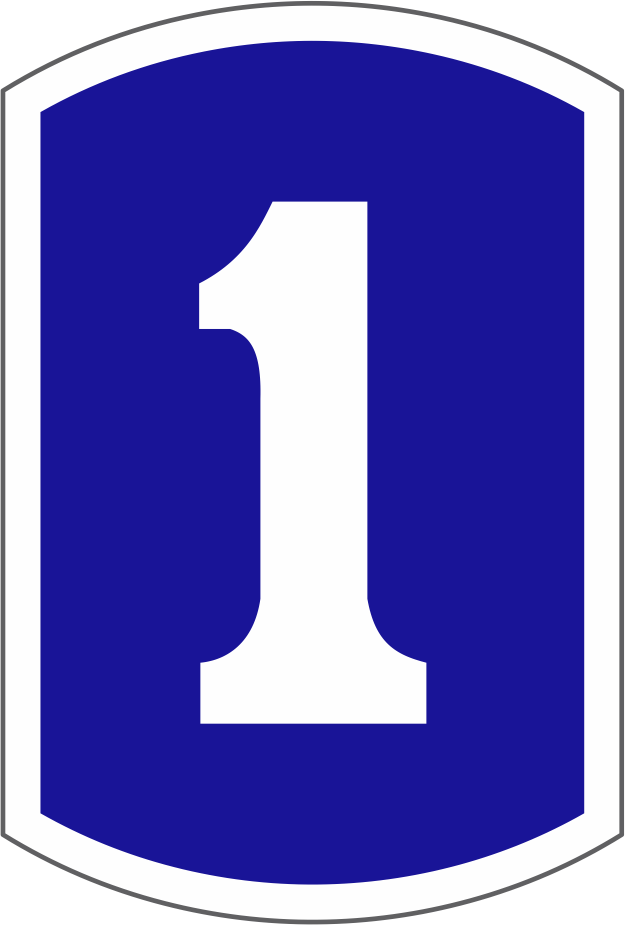
1st Infantry Brigade (Separate) 1958-1962

Under the United States Army's pentomic reorganization, the 1st Infantry Brigade was reconstituted in the Regular Army on 8 July 1958 an independent unit, stationed at Fort Benning until it was inactivated on 24 September 1962. The 1st Brigade rejoined the 1st Infantry Division on 2 January 1964, after being activated at Fort Riley, Kansas.

=== Operation Desert Storm ===
In 1990, it deployed with the Big Red One to Southwest Asia in support of Operation Desert Shield/Desert Storm. Leading the breach of Iraqi defenses on 24 February 1991, the Brigade actively fought and destroyed the enemy in the 3 campaigns involving the Defense of Saudi Arabia and the Liberation of Kuwait. In recognition of their contributions, each of the Brigade's battalions received the Valorous Unit Citation.

=== Operation Iraqi Freedom ===
On 23 July 2003, US Army Forces Command alerted the 1st Brigade for deployment to the Iraq Theater of Operations in support of Operation Iraqi Freedom. The brigade deployed its main body starting on 2 September, closing in Kuwait by 11 September. Initially attached to the 82nd Airborne Division, the brigade occupied Area of Operations Topeka and conducted Transition of Authority with the 3rd Squadron, 3d Armored Cavalry Regiment, on 26 September. On 20 March 2004, CJTF-7 attached 1st Brigade to the 1st Marine Division to continue its offensive operations in AO Topeka.

In the following twelve months, the brigade's offensive operations killed 541 insurgents, wounded 101 more, and detained over 2,081 enemy fighters, including the capture of 18 high-value targets and 20 foreign fighters. The brigade responded to hundreds of small arms and RPG engagements, as well as over 550 IED (improvised explosive device) attacks. In order to disrupt the enemy's ability to conduct operations, the brigade captured 41 heavy machine guns, 175 RPG launchers, 3,134 mortar and artillery rounds, 1,781 rockets, and 17 surface-to-air missiles. In addition to combat operations, the brigade formed and trained the 60th Iraqi National Guard Brigade, including the 500th, 501st, and 502nd ING Battalions. 1st Brigade also sponsored over $23.8 million in civil projects in the Al Anbar province. The BCT returned to Fort Riley in September 2004.

In January 2005 the 1st Brigade was again called upon to prepare for deployment for OIF. The brigade spent the majority of 2005 refitting and training for deployment in fall 2005. This training culminated with the brigade's deployment to the Joint Readiness Training Center in August and September 2005.

In January 2006 the 1st Brigade received a mission change and began restructuring in order to better train military transition teams for their deployment.

Several security force companies, or SECFOR companies, began preparing to deploy to Iraq in the fall of 2006.

On 23 September 2009, the brigade officially moved the military transition team mission to Fort Polk, Louisiana, and stood up as a deployable heavy brigade combat team. The last of the MiTTs trained by the brigade completed their mission in October 2010.

=== 2022 Russian invasion of Ukraine ===
On the 24th of February 2022, the same day as the 2022 Russian invasion of Ukraine started, President Joe Biden extended the 1st Brigade Combat Team's deployment to Europe where it would be used to bolster NATO deterrence in Europe.

== Organization ==
1st Armored Brigade Combat Team (1st ABCT) (Devil Brigade)

- Headquarters and Headquarters Company (HHC)
- 1st Squadron, 4th Cavalry Regiment
- 1st Battalion, 16th Infantry Regiment Iron Rangers
- 2nd Battalion, 34th Armor Regiment Dreadnaughts
- 3rd Battalion, 66th Armor Regiment Burt's Knights
- 1st Battalion, 5th Field Artillery Regiment (1-5th FAR) "Hamilton's Own"
- 1st Engineer Battalion Diehards
- 101st Brigade Support Battalion (101st BSB) Liberty
