= Eighth Corps Area =

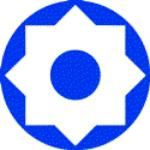
- Active: 20 August 1920–7 December 1941
- Country: United States of America
- Branch: United States Army
- Type: Military District
- Role: Training
- Part of: Department of War
- Garrison/HQ: Fort Sam Houston, Texas

Eighth Corps Area was a military formation of the United States Army. Its headquarters was at Fort Sam Houston, TX. It was established on 20 August 1920 with headquarters at Fort Sam Houston, TX, and organized from portions of the discontinued Southern Department.

The Eighth Corps Area included the states of Texas, Oklahoma, Colorado, New Mexico, and Arizona. For administrative purposes and for tactical control in connection with border patrol field operations, that part of the state of Arizona that lies west of the 114 degree meridian and south of the 33 degree parallel was attached to the Ninth Corps Area.

As a major, future Air Force Chief of Staff Carl A Spaatz served as the air officer of the Eighth Corps Area in 1921.

The Eighth Corps Area Training Center was established in 1921 at Fort Sam Houston, Texas. The training area was responsible for annual summer training of regular army, organized reserves, R.O.T.C. and the C.M.T.C.

In March 1925, when Billy Mitchell's term as Assistant Chief of the Air Service expired, he reverted to his permanent rank of colonel and was transferred to San Antonio, Texas, as air officer to the Eighth Corps Area. Although such demotions were not unusual in demobilizations (Patrick himself had gone from major general to colonel upon returning to the Army Corps of Engineers in 1919), the move was widely seen as punishment and exile, since Mitchell had petitioned to remain as Assistant Chief when his term expired, and his transfer to an assignment with no political influence at a relatively unimportant Army base had been directed by Secretary of

War John W. Weeks.

In May 1927, the Pole Mountain Reservation and the post of Fort D. A. Russell (later renamed Fort Francis E. Warren) in Wyoming came under the control of the Eighth Corps Area when the 4th Infantry Brigade was transferred to that post from Fort Sam Houston. The installations were returned to control of the Ninth Corps Area on 1 July 1939.

At the end of General Frank M. Andrews' four-year term as Commanding General of GHQ Air Force on March 1, 1939, he was not reappointed, reverted to his permanent rank of colonel, and was reassigned as air officer for the Eighth Corps Area in San Antonio, the same exile to which Billy Mitchell had been sent. Possibly expected to retire, he instead was recalled to Washington just four months later by Marshall after President Franklin D. Roosevelt named George C. Marshall to serve as Chief of Staff of the United States Army following Malin Craig's retirement.

HQ, Eighth Corps Area was responsible for the mobilization, administration, and training of units of the Second and Fifth Armies, VIII and XVIII Army Corps, select GHQ Reserve units, and the Zone of the Interior (ZI) support units of the Eighth Corps Area Service Command. Mobile units of the corps area, except for GHQ Reserve and ZI units, were assigned to the Third and Sixth Armies from 1921 to 1933.

Major commands in the corps area included Third Army (1933–36 and 1940–41); VIII Corps: 2d Division with 3rd and 4th Infantry Brigades; 36th Division, 45th Division; XVIII Corps: 90th Division, 95th Division, 103d Division; the 1st Cavalry Division; the 3d Wing (1932–35); the 24th School Wing (1927–31); and the Eighth Corps Area Service Command.

From 1922-27 the 44th Observation Squadron was attached to the Field Artillery School, initially at Post Field, Oklahoma. The 154th Observation Squadron was assigned to the Eighth Corps Area on 16 September 1940, but was later reassigned to Third Army.

== Commanders ==
Eighth Corps Area

- Major General Joseph T. Dickman 1 September 1920–6 October 1921
- Major General John L. Hines 7 October 1921–20 November 1922
- Major General Edward M. Lewis 20 November 1922–11 October 1924
- Major General Charles P. Summerall 12 October 1924–15 January 1925
- Major General Ernest Hinds 16 January 1925–3 January 1928
- Major General Thomas Q. Donaldson 4 January 1928–28 April 1928
- Major General Albert J. Bowley 29 April 1928–24 December 1928
- Major General William Lassiter 24 December 1928–27 July 1930
- Brig. Gen. Halstead Dorey 27 July 1930–21 November 1930
- Major General Edwin B. Winans 22 November 1930–30 September 1933
- Major General Johnson Hagood 3 October 1933–27 February 1936
- Major General Henry W. Butner 27 February 1936–19 March 1936
- Brigadier General Hamilton S. Hawkins III 19 March 1936–4 April 1936
- Major General Frank Parker 4 April 1936–30 September 1936
- Major General Herbert J. Brees 1 October 1936–9 November 1940

Eighth Corps Area Service Command & Eighth Service Command

- Major General Richard Donovan 10 November 1940–15 June 1945
- Lieutenant General Walton Walker 15 June 1945 to May 1946.
