= Wilkins House (Greenville, South Carolina) =

- William and Harriet Wilkins House
- U.S. National Register of Historic Places
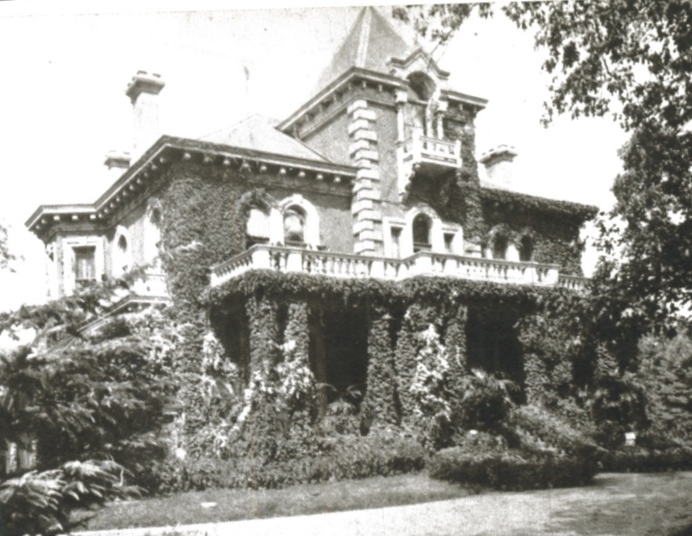
- Wilkins House, c. 1910

- Location within South Carolina Location within the United States
- Location: Greenville, South Carolina
- Coordinates: 34°49′51″N 82°24′22″W
- Built: 1876
- Architectural style: Italianate
- NRHP reference No.: 16000463
- Added to NRHP: July 19, 2016

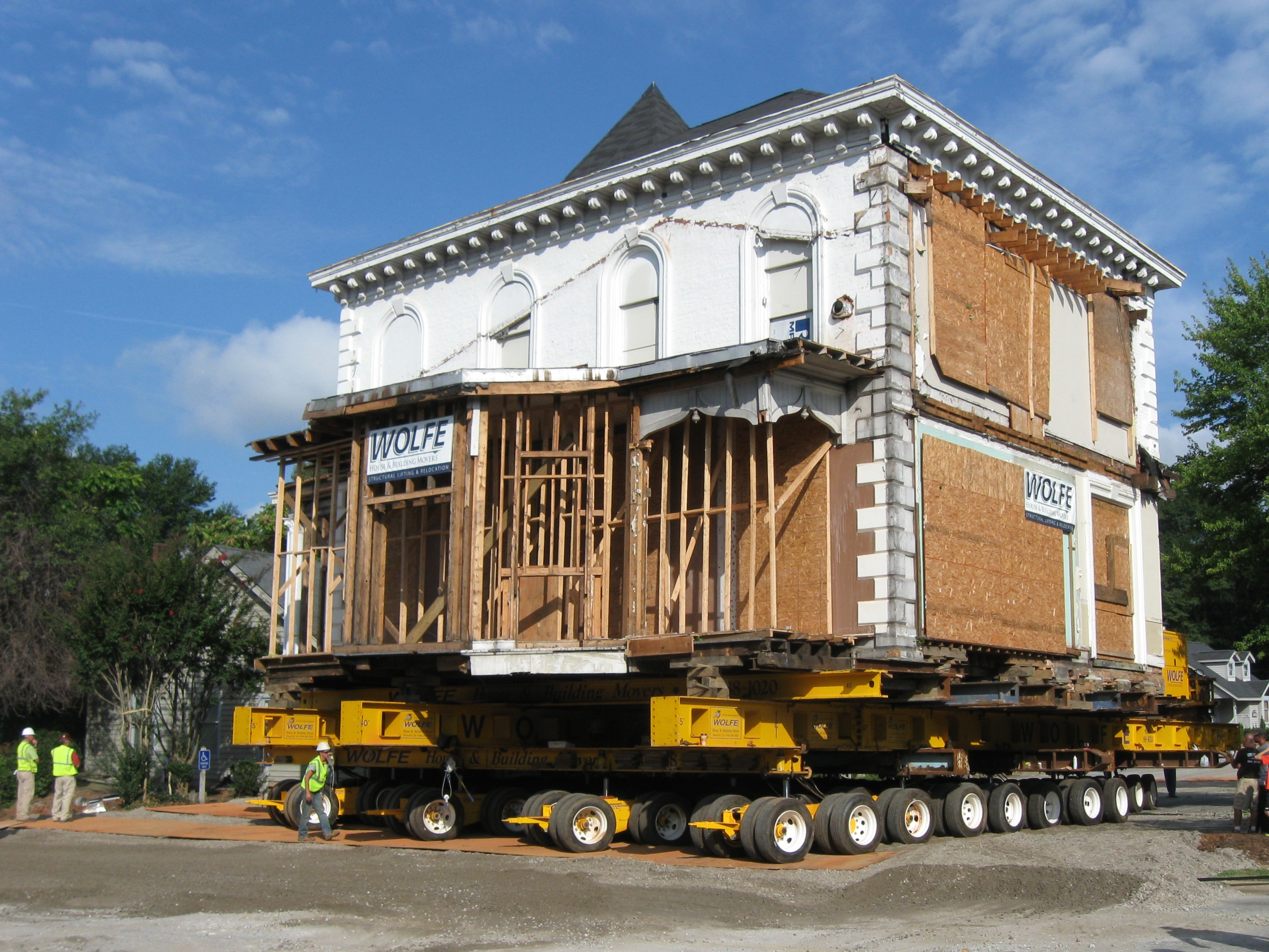
Wilkins House being moved, September 6, 2014

The Wilkins House is a historic house in Greenville, South Carolina, built in 1878 by Jacob W. Cagle (1832–1910) for merchant and capitalist William T. Wilkins (1825–1895). It was listed on the National Register of Historic Places on July 19, 2016.

Wilkins, a native of Spartanburg, South Carolina, engaged in the hardware business in Charleston and New York City prior to the Civil War, though he returned to South Carolina to fight for the Confederacy. By his death in 1895, Wilkins was "a large stockholder in nearly every manufacturing enterprise in Greenville."

In 1867, Wilkins married Harriet Dawkins Cleveland (1843–1930) of Greenville, a woman wealthy in her own right; and in 1875 they settled in her hometown. On 93 acres Wilkins built a two-story brick mansion in the Italianate style, reflecting their prominence in the business and social life of the community. An 1898 publication described the house as "the finest home of any man in northern South Carolina." The elegant interior, decorated in high Victorian style, included large crystal chandeliers, bas-relief carvings, and an impressive curved staircase. A conservatory on the north side was crowded with plants and flowers. Even after the death of her husband and only son, Mrs. Wilkins (thereafter always dressed in black) continued to play the grand lady, hosting luxurious dinner parties and being driven to social appointments in an enclosed carriage.

On her death in 1930, the house passed to a nephew who leased it to a funeral home, Jones Mortuary, which made superficial modifications to the interior but (among other exterior alterations, including painting the brick white) added a 1,200-square-foot chapel—enough change to make the structure ineligible for inclusion on the National Register. The funeral home closed in 1999, and for ten years the building was used for antique and specialty shops and as a wedding venue.

When the now four-acre property was sold to a buyer who wished to demolish the house and build a nursing home and assisted living center, real estate developer Neil Wilson bought the house, intending to preserve and restore it. With assistance from the Palmetto Trust for Historic Preservation and members of the Greenville community, the necessary $720,000 to move the house was raised in 2014. The funeral home additions were demolished, and on September 6, 2014, the approximately 750-ton house was moved a few blocks from Augusta Street to Mills Avenue—probably becoming in the process the heaviest structure ever moved in South Carolina.

Although buildings that have been moved are typically ineligible for the National Register, the Wilkins house was considered eligible on the basis of its architecture ("an excellent example of a high-style Italianate residence") and because it was a rare residential construction by Jacob Cagle. In 2017 the Wilkins House earned a State Preservation Award from the South Carolina Department of Archives and History.
