= Palmetto Compress and Warehouse Company Building =

- U.S. National Register of Historic Places
- Location within South Carolina Location within the United States
- Location: 617 Devine St. Columbia, South Carolina
- Coordinates: 33°59′29″N 81°2′20″W
- Area: 4 acres (1.6 ha)
- Built: 1917, 1923
- Architect: Urquhart, James B.
- MPS: Columbia MRA
- NRHP reference No.: 85003237
- Added to NRHP: October 17, 1985

Palmetto Compress and Warehouse Company Building is a historic cotton bale compress facility and warehouse building located at Columbia, South Carolina. The first section of the four-story brick building was built in 1917. The building was doubled in size in 1923.

It was added to the National Register of Historic Places in 1985.
