= Trinity Episcopal Church and Cemetery =

Historic site in Abbeville County, South Carolina, US

- U.S. National Register of Historic Places
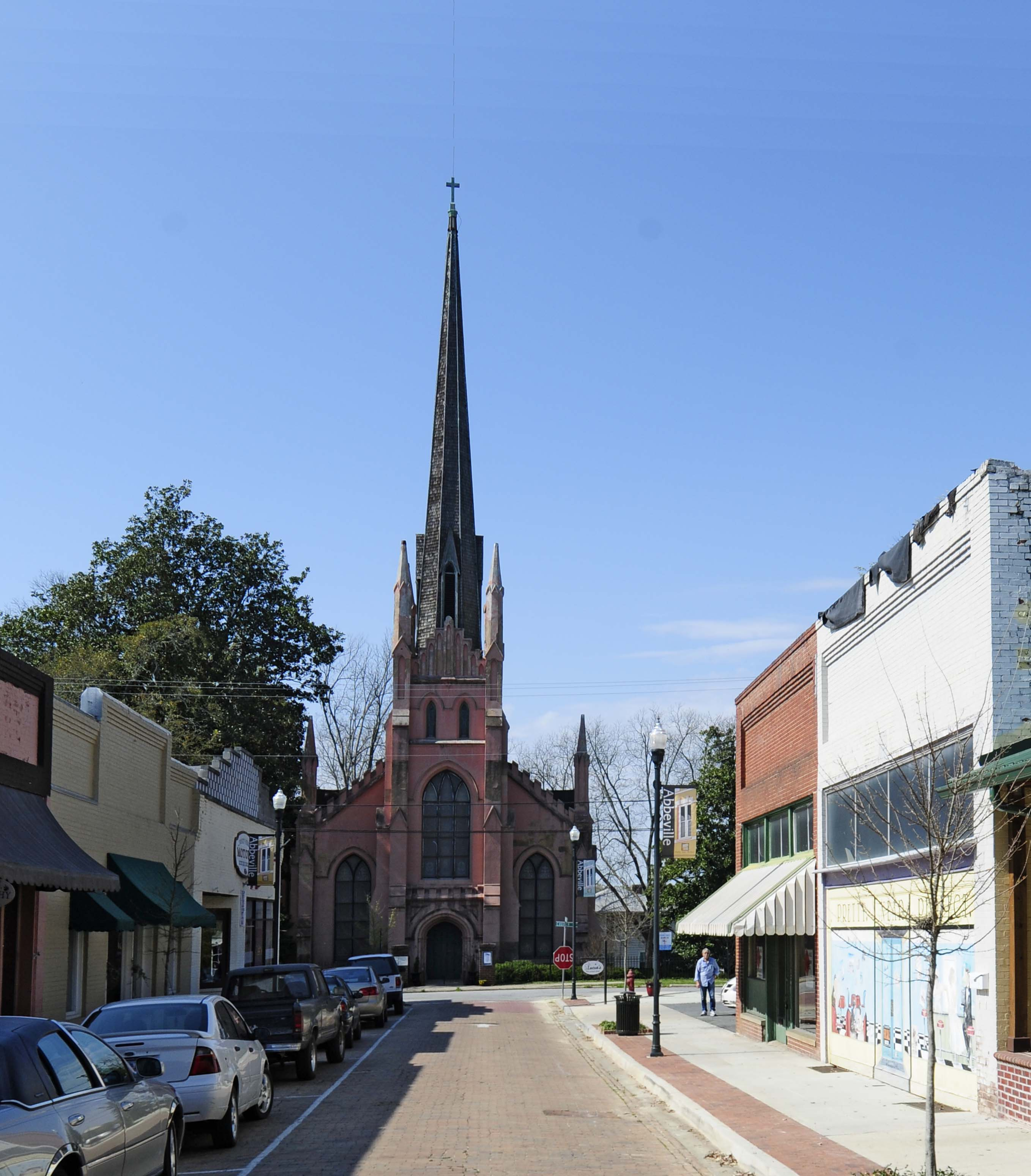

- Location within South Carolina Location within the United States
- Location: Church St., Abbeville, South Carolina
- Coordinates: 34°10′35″N 82°22′49″W
- Area: 3 acres (1.2 ha)
- Built: 1860
- Architectural style: Gothic Revival
- NRHP reference No.: 71000738
- Added to NRHP: May 06, 1971

Trinity Episcopal Church and Cemetery is a historic church and cemetery on Church Street in Abbeville, South Carolina.

It was built in 1860 and added to the National Register in 1971.

== Notable burials ==
- Armistead Burt, US Congressman
- Francis L. Parker, US Army brigadier general
