= Hamilton S. Hawkins III =

United States Army general (1872–1951)

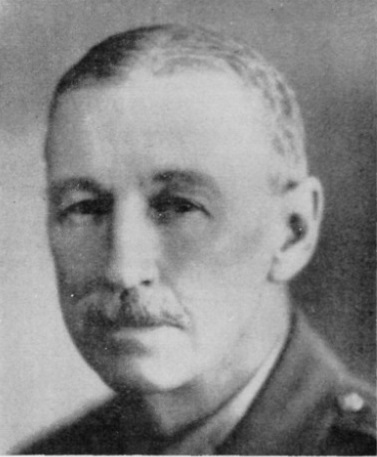
- From the April 1951 issue of Assembly magazine
- Born: September 25, 1872; Fort Buford, North Dakota, U.S.
- Died: October 19, 1950 (aged 78); Washington, D.C., U.S.
- Burial place: West Point Cemetery, West Point, New York, U.S.
- Education: United States Military Academy; United States Army Command and General Staff College; United States Army War College
- Spouse: Helen (Smith) Hawkins (m. 1897)
- Children: 2
- Relatives: Hamilton S. Hawkins (father); Andrew C. Gray (grandfather); George Gray (uncle); Robert Lee Howze (brother in law); Hamilton H. Howze (nephew)
- Military career
- Service: United States Army
- Service years: 1894–1936; 1941–1943
- Rank: Brigadier General
- Service number: O447
- Unit: U.S. Army Cavalry Branch
- Commands: Troop E, 4th Cavalry Regiment; 69th Infantry Brigade; 1st Cavalry Regiment; 3rd Cavalry Regiment; 14th Infantry Brigade; 1st Cavalry Brigade; 1st Cavalry Division; Eighth Corps Area
- Wars: Philippine–American War; Mexican Border War; World War I Occupation of the Rhineland; World War II
- Awards: Silver Star (3); Purple Heart

Hamilton Smith Hawkins III (September 25, 1872 – October 19, 1950) was a career officer in the United States Army who attained the rank of brigadier general. A veteran of the Philippine–American War, Mexican Border War, World War I, and the Occupation of the Rhineland, Hawkins served from 1894 until retiring in 1936, then was recalled to active duty for World War II and served from 1941 to 1943. Hawkins was a recipient of the Purple Heart for wounds he received during the Philippine–American War, and he was a three-time recipient of the Silver Star.

The son of Brigadier General Hamilton S. Hawkins (1834–1910) and grandson of Major Hamilton S. Hawkins (1802–1847), Hawkins graduated from the United States Military Academy in 1894 and received his commission as a second lieutenant in the Cavalry Branch. Hawkins served in positions of increasing rank and responsibility in the United States and overseas, and completed professional education including the United States Army Command and General Staff College and United States Army War College. In 1912 and 1913, Hawkins took part in an exchange program that enabled him to serve in France and Germany, where he observed advances in Cavalry equipment and tactics immediately prior to the start of World War I. During the war, he served as assistant chief of staff for operations (G-3) on the staff of the 2nd Division, followed by assignment as chief of staff for the 35th Division.

After the First World War, Hawkins continued to serve in high-profile staff and command assignments, including commander of 1st Cavalry Brigade (1929–1934), 1st Cavalry Division (1934–1936), and Eighth Corps Area (1936). He retired in 1936 and resided in Washington, D.C. He was recalled to active duty for World War II, and served as a member of several administrative boards and commissions before retiring again in 1943. In retirement, Hawkins continued to reside in Washington, D.C. He died in Washington on October 19, 1950, and was buried at West Point Cemetery.

== Early life ==
Hamilton Smith Hawkins was born at Fort Buford, North Dakota on September 25, 1872, the son of army officer Hamilton S. Hawkins and Annie (Gray) Hawkins. Annie Hawkins was the sister of George Gray, a U.S. senator and federal judge from Delaware. Hawkins' grandfather, also named Hamilton S. Hawkins, was a major and surgeon in the U.S. Army who died in 1847 while serving in the Mexican–American War. Hawkins' sister Anne was the wife of Major General Robert Lee Howze and mother of General Hamilton H. Howze and Major General Robert L. Howze Jr.

Hawkins was educated at military posts as the Hawkins family traveled for his father's career, and in 1890 received an appointment to the United States Military Academy (West Point). He graduated in 1894 ranked of 24th of 54. Hawkins received his commission as a second lieutenant of Cavalry and was assigned to the 4th Cavalry Regiment.

== Start of career ==
Hawkins served with the 4th Cavalry at Fort Walla Walla, Washington from September 1894 to May 1897, and at Fort Yellowstone from May 1897 to January 1899. From January to June 1899, Hawkins taught mathematics at West Point. In June 1899, he sailed for the Philippines for duty with the 4th Cavalry during the Philippine–American War. While in the Philippines, he commanded the 4th Cavalry's Troop E during combat on the island of Luzon. After returning to the United States, Hawkins performed duty at Fort Meade, South Dakota from July to November 1901, when he was assigned to temporary duty in Washington, D.C., first with the Subsistence Department, then with the Commissary Department. From April 1903 to December 1905, Hawkins performed staff duty with the Department of the Colorado, including assistant to the Chief Commissary and acting Judge Advocate.

From January 1906 to April 1907, Hawkins served again in the Philippines as Sales and Issue Commissary in Manila, followed by service with the 4th Cavalry at Camp Overton near the city of Iligan. Upon return to the United States, he served with his regiment at Fort Meade. From 1910 to 1911, Hawkins attended the Army School of the Line (now the United States Army Command and General Staff College). From 1911 to 1912, he attended the Army Staff College (now the United States Army War College). From October 1912 to May 1913, Hawkins served in France as an observer with the French Army's 6th Dragoons. From May to October 1913, he was an observer in Germany with the 2nd Brandenberger Dragoons.

== Continued career ==
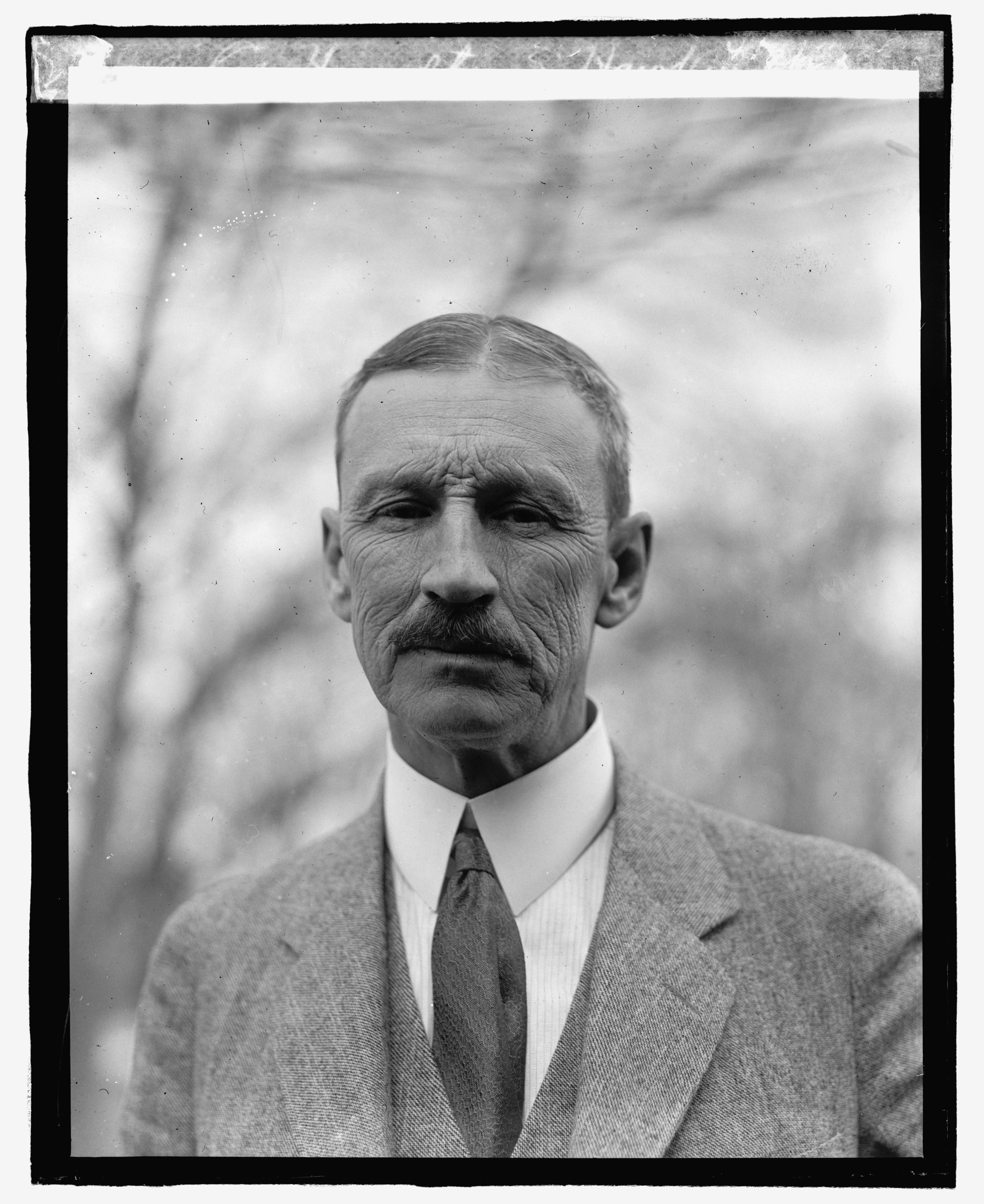
National Photo Company photograph of Hawkins as a colonel in 1923

In November 1913, Hawkins joined the 3rd Cavalry Regiment at Brownsville, Texas. He performed duty with the regiment in 1914 and 1915 as part of the Mexican Border War. In 1915, he completed the Field Officer's Course at the Fort Riley, Kansas Mounted Service School. Afterwards, he was posted to San Antonio, Texas to supervise the purchase of horses and mules for army use. In July 1916, he joined the 4th Cavalry at Schofield Barracks, Hawaii.

Following the U.S. entry into World War I, in August 1917, Hawkins was posted to the 164th Depot Brigade at Camp Funston, Kansas, where he supervised military schools for the 89th Division during its initial organization and training. From January to April 1918, he was an instructor at the Fort Sam Houston, Texas Field Officers' School. He performed duty with the army general staff in Washington, D.C. from April to June 1918, when he departed for France.

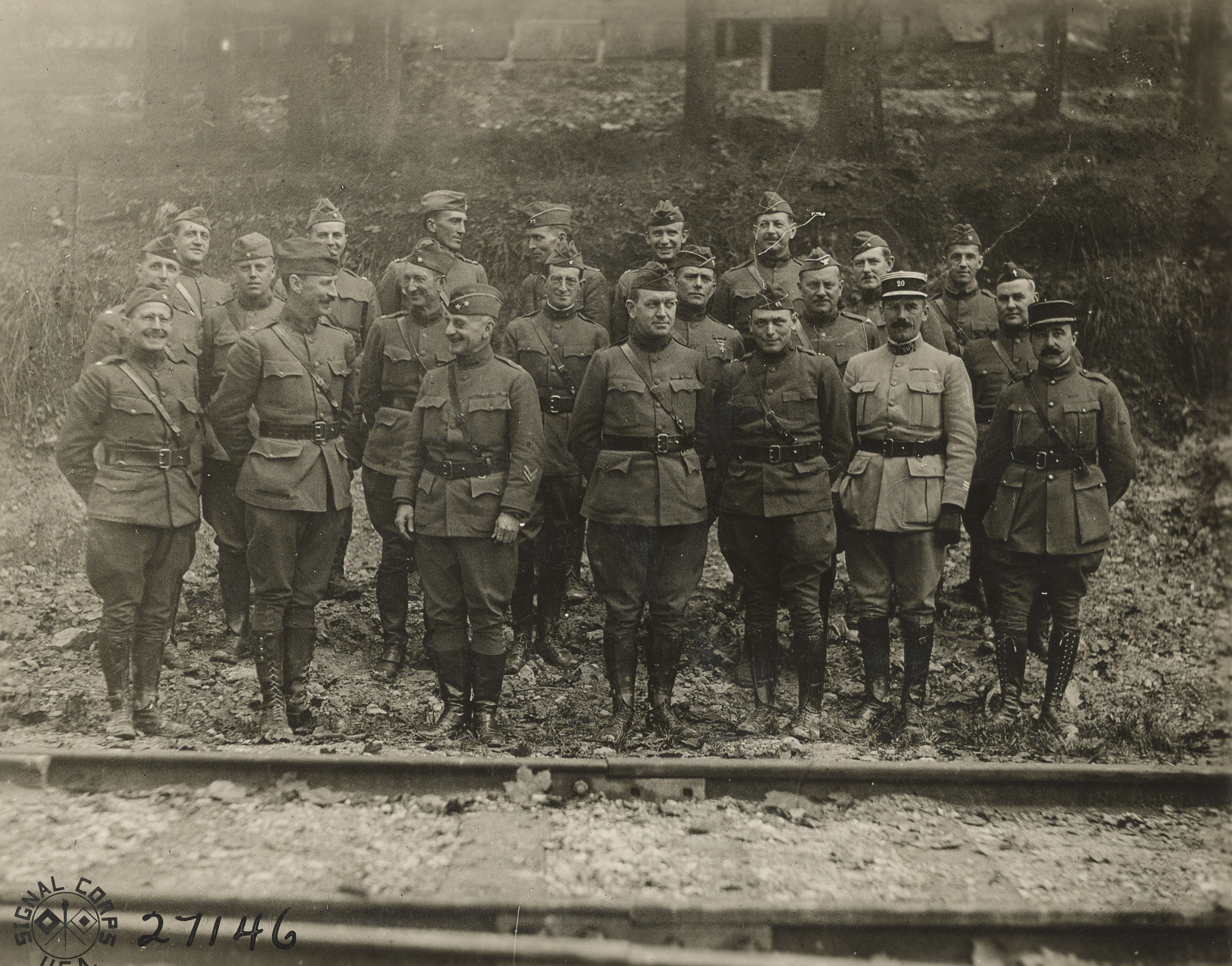
Major General Peter E. Traub (front row, third from the left) and members of his divisional staff at Sommedieue, Meuse, France, October 21, 1918. To Traub's right is Colonel Hamilton S. Hawkins, the 35th's chief of staff.

Upon arriving in France, Hawkins completed the Army Staff College at Langres, then was assigned to the 2nd Division as assistant chief of staff for operations (G-3), with which he took part in the Battle of Saint-Mihiel. He was then assigned as chief of staff of the 35th Division, with which he took part in the Meuse–Argonne offensive. In September and October he commanded the division's 69th Infantry Brigade during some of the war's final battles. From October 1918 to April 1919, he again served as the 35th Division's chief of staff, including occupation duty in the Sommedieue sector. From May to July 1919, he commanded the 1st Cavalry Regiment at Camp Harry J. Jones, Arizona. In August 1919, Hawkins was posted to Fort Riley as assistant commandant of the Cavalry School.

== Later career ==
In April 1923, Hawkins was assigned to command the 3rd Cavalry Regiment at Fort Myer, Virginia. In August 1926, he was assigned to Manila as chief of staff of the Philippine Division. After his September 1928 return to the United States, Hawkins was assigned as commander of the 14th Infantry Brigade, a unit of the 7th Infantry based at Fort Omaha, Nebraska.

In September 1929, Hawkins was assigned to Fort Clark, Texas as commander of the 1st Cavalry Brigade. In April 1934, he was posted to Fort Bliss, Texas as commander of the 1st Cavalry Division. In March and April 1936, Hawkins commanded the Eighth Corps Area. He retired upon reaching the mandatory retirement age of 64 in September 1936.

== Retirement ==
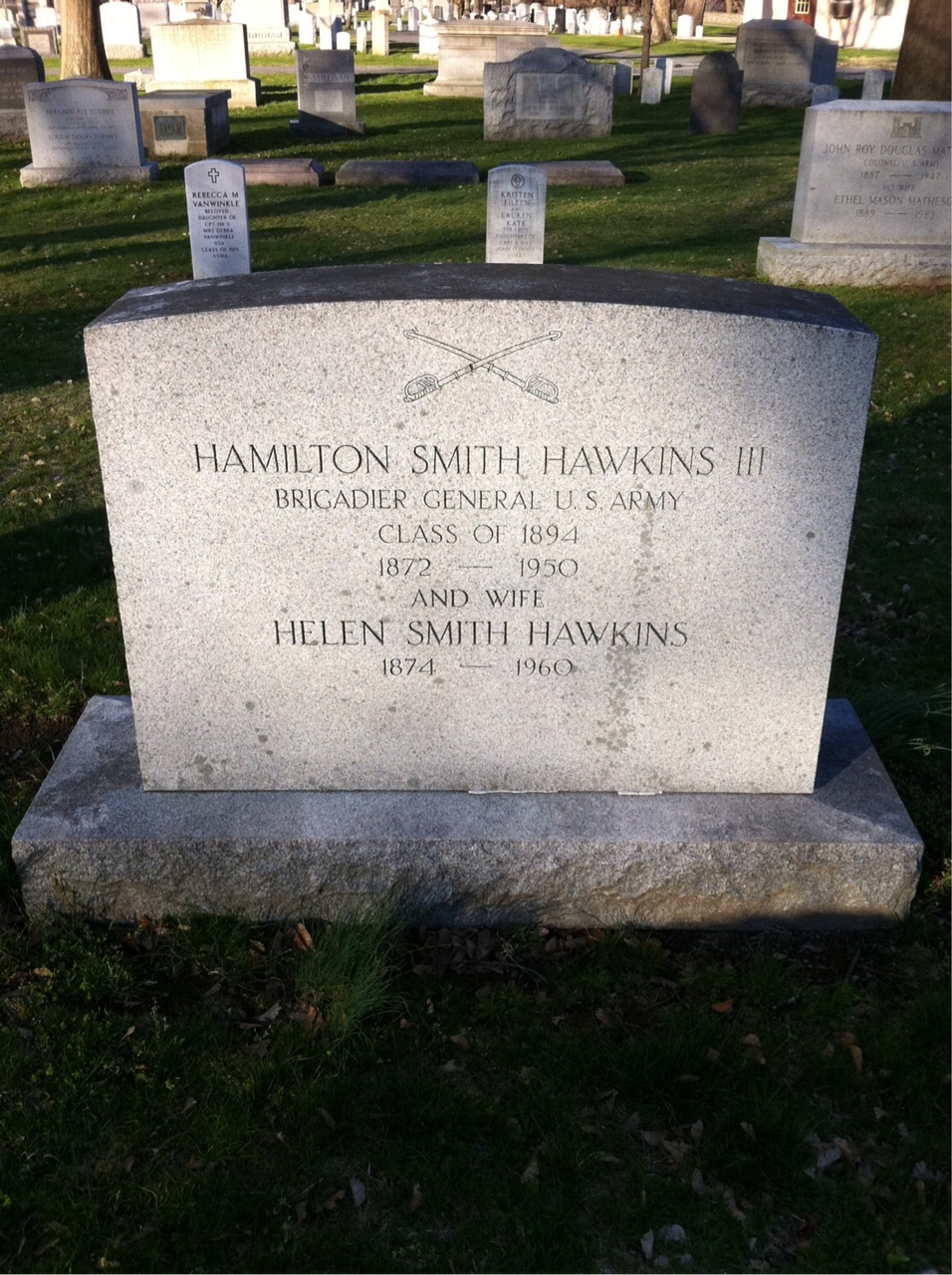
Hawkins' grave marker at West Point Cemetery

Hawkins resided in Washington, D.C. after he retired. He was recalled to active duty for World War II in 1941 and served on several administrative boards and commissions, including member of the panel that mediated a labor dispute at the Atlanta, Birmingham and Coast Railroad. He retired again in 1943.

Hawkins died in Washington on October 19, 1950. He was buried at West Point Cemetery.

== Family ==
In 1897, Hawkins married Helen Smith of Staunton, Virginia. They were the parents of two children, daughter Anne and son Hamilton IV. Hamilton S. Hawkins IV died in a polo accident in 1926, shortly before the graduation ceremony for his West Point class.

== Awards and effective dates of rank ==
Hawkins was a recipient of the Silver Star with two oak leaf clusters and the Purple Heart. His effective dates of rank were:

- Second Lieutenant (Additional), June 12, 1894
- Second Lieutenant, August 30, 1894
- First Lieutenant, March 2, 1899
- Captain, March 1, 1901
- Major, July 1, 1916
- Lieutenant Colonel, July 28, 1917
- Colonel (Temporary), August 5, 1917
- Lieutenant Colonel, September 25, 1919
- Colonel, July 1, 1920
- Brigadier General, September 5, 1928
- Brigadier General (Retired), September 30, 1936
- Brigadier General, September 26, 1941
- Brigadier General (Retired), November 13, 1943

== Works by ==
(Partial list)

- "The Rôle of Cavalry". The Cavalry Journal. Washington, DC: United States Cavalry Journal. October 1920. pp. 260–265 – via Google Books.
- "Some Observations on the Attack by Combined Arms". The Cavalry Journal. Washington, DC: United States Cavalry Association. March–April 1938. pp. 146–149 – via Google Books.
- "General Hawkins' Notes: Some Lessons From the War In Spain". The Cavalry Journal. Washington, DC: United States Cavalry Association. March–April 1938. pp. 173–174 – via Google Books.
- "Lessons for Today From Indian Campaigns of Yesterday". The Cavalry Journal. Washington, DC: United States Cavalry Association. July–August 1938. pp. 340–344 – via Google Books.
- "General Hawkins' Notes: The Combination of Horse Cavalry With Mechanized Cavalry". The Cavalry Journal. Washington, DC: United States Cavalry Association. September–October 1938. pp. 461–462 – via Google Books.
- "Imagination Gone Wild". The Cavalry Journal. Washington, DC: United States Cavalry Association. November–December 1938. pp. 491–497 – via Google Books.
- "The First Requirement of a Citizen Army". Coast Artillery Journal. Washington, DC: United States Coast Artillery Association. March–April 1945. pp. 44–45 – via Google Books.
