= Ora Elmer Hunt =

United States Army general

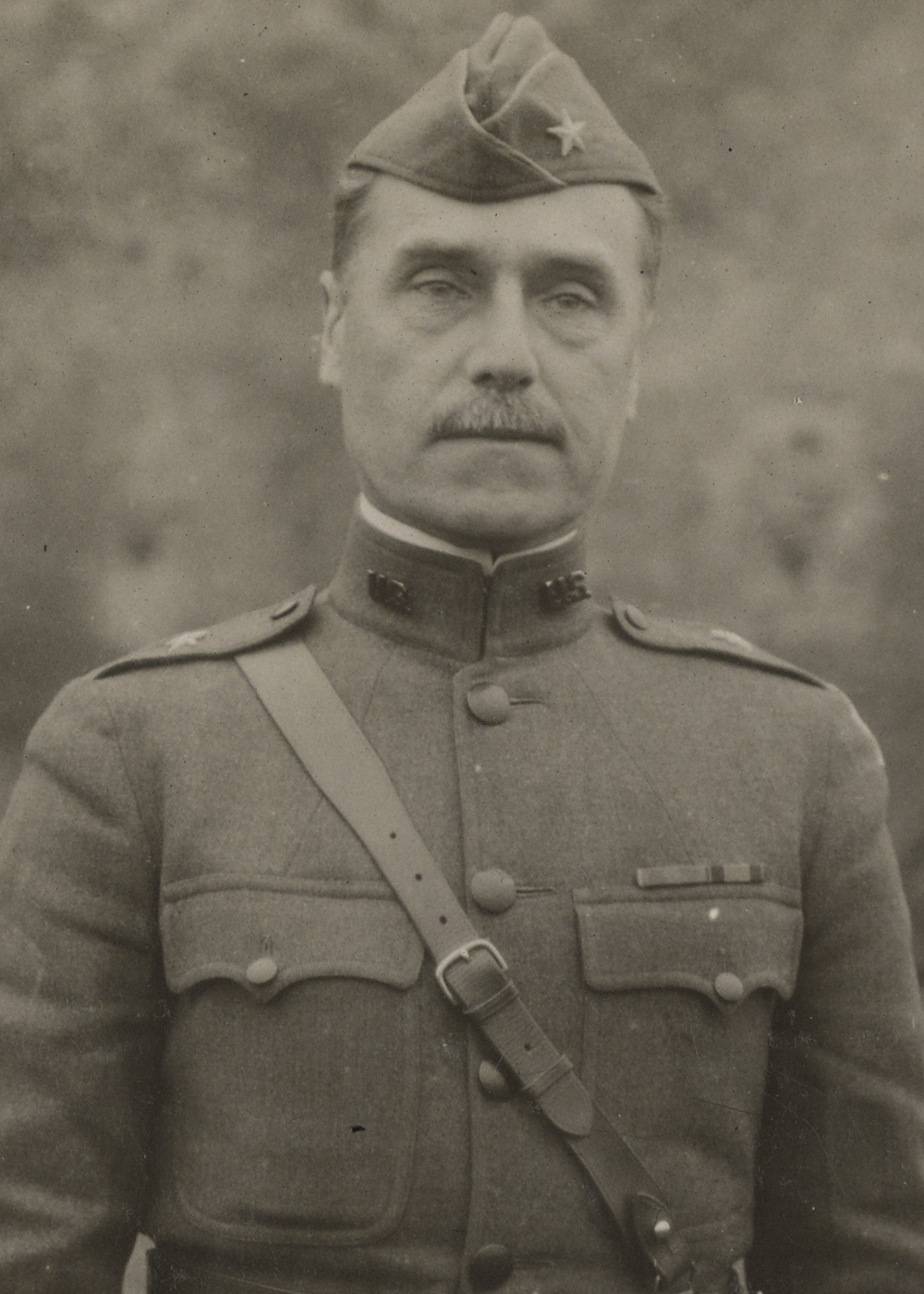
- Hunt in January 1919
- Born: June 26, 1872; Napa County, California, US
- Died: August 20, 1969 (aged 97); Berkeley, California, US
- Military career
- Allegiance: United States of America
- Branch: United States Army
- Service years: 1894–1923
- Rank: Brigadier General
- Service number: 0-450
- Conflicts: Philippine Insurrection; World War I; • Battle of Saint-Mihiel; • Meuse–Argonne offensive
- Awards: Distinguished Service Medal; Silver Star

Ora Elmer Hunt (June 26, 1872 – August 20, 1969) was an officer of the U.S. Army from 1894 to 1923. After graduating from United States Military Academy, he participated during the Philippine Insurrection. He was a graduate from the Infantry and Cavalry school at Fort Leavenworth and the Army Staff College from 1906 to 1907. He was a professor of English, modern languages and history at United States Military Academy from 1912 to 1914 and again in 1917. During World War I, Hunt was colonel of the 320th Infantry at Camp Lee. In 1918, he was promoted to brigadier general during the Battle of Saint-Mihiel and the Meuse–Argonne offensive. From 1919 to his retirement in 1923, Hunt was stationed in Germany and served as the Inspector General Department.

== Early life ==
Ora Elmer Hunt was born to Frank Martin Hunt and Mary E. Southard Hunt in the Berryessa Valley of Napa County, California on June 26, 1872. Raised in Point Arena, California, he attended school about thirty miles away in Boonville. Hunt entered the United States Military Academy (USMA), and graduated number twenty-nine of fifty-four in class of 1894.

== Military career ==
In 1898, Hunt left Vancouver Barracks and participated during the Philippine Insurrection. Following the Philippine Insurrection, he had a tour of duty at West Point. Hunt was a distinguished graduate of Infantry and Cavalry School at Fort Leavenworth. He also graduate from the Army Staff College in 1907. From 1908 to 1910, Hunt was professor of English, History, and modern languages at USMA. Hunt returned as associate professor of modern languages until 1917.

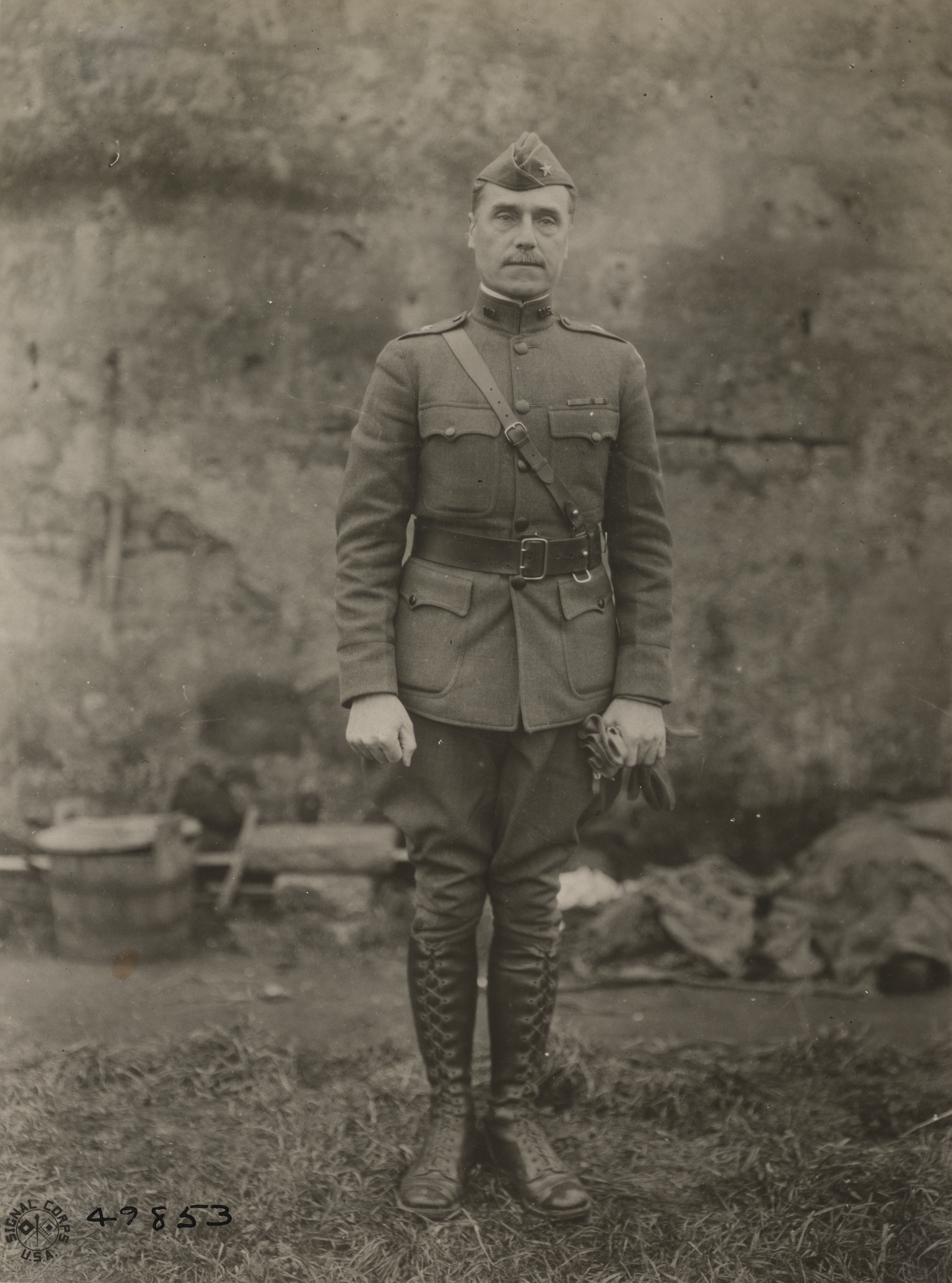
Hunt during occupation duty in Germany, January 1919.

During World War I, he was a senior instructor in infantry tactics at Fort Myer. On April 12, 1918, Hunt was promoted to brigadier general and commanded the 165th Infantry Brigade, 83rd Division and succeeded the relieved Brigadier General Charles Crawford in command of the Sixth Infantry Brigade, Third Division. He was awarded the Army Distinguished Service Medal along with the Silver Star for his role during the battles at Saint-Mihiel and the Meuse-Argonne.

After World War I, Hunt reverted to his permanent rank of lieutenant colonel on October 31, 1919, and then was promoted to colonel on July 1, 1920. He was assigned to the Inspector General Department until his retirement in 1923.

== Later life ==
After Hunt's military service, he was member of the U.S. mission to Nicaragua that supervised the presidential elections. He was advanced to brigadier general on the retired list in June 1930. Hunt was a member of the West Point Alumni Association and an editor of the Photographic History of the Civil War. He lived in Berkeley, California until his death on August 20, 1969. Hunt was buried at West Point Cemetery on August 27, 1969.

== Relations ==
Hunt married Eva B. Smith in January and had three children Ora L. Hunt, Edna V. Hunt (Mrs. Colin T. Penn) and Margaret Hunt (Mrs. M. H. Pringle). The marriage ended on August 18, 1927. In 1929, he married Josephine W. Guion and had one child, Katherine Guion. Josephine Guion Hunt was buried beside her husband on May 4, 1982.

== Honors and awards ==
=== Distinguished Service Medal ===
==== Citation ====
The President of the United States of America, authorized by Act of Congress, July 9, 1918, takes pleasure in presenting the Army Distinguished Service Medal to Brigadier General Ora Elmer Hunt, United States Army, for exceptionally meritorious and distinguished services to the Government of the United States, in a duty of great responsibility during World War I. As Commander of the 6th Infantry Brigade, 3d Division, during the greater part of its active operations, General Hunt achieved notable success, demonstrating high qualities of leadership. Through his exceptional tactical ability his brigade was enabled to overcome desperate hostile resistance during its participation in the Meuse-Argonne offensive. By his efforts he has contributed materially to the brilliant success of his brigade in that important operation.

=== Silver Star ===
==== Citation ====
By direction of the President, under the provisions of the act of Congress approved July 9, 1918, Brigadier General Ora Elmer Hunt, United States Army, is cited by the Commanding General, American Expeditionary Forces, for gallantry in action and a silver star may be placed upon the ribbon of the Victory Medals awarded him. Brigadier General Hunt distinguished himself by gallantry in action while serving as Commanding Officer, 6th Infantry Brigade, 3d Division, American Expeditionary Forces, in action near Montfaucon, France, 12 October 1918, and by his brilliant leadership.

== Sources ==
- Davis, Henry Blaine Jr. (1998). Generals in Khaki. Bur Oak, Circle, Raleigh, North Carolina: Pentland and Press. ISBN 978-1571970886. D507.D281998.
- "Ora Elmer Hunt", "Roll of Honor", accessed 15 October 2018
