= George Henson Estes =

United States Army brigadier general

George Henson Estes Jr.
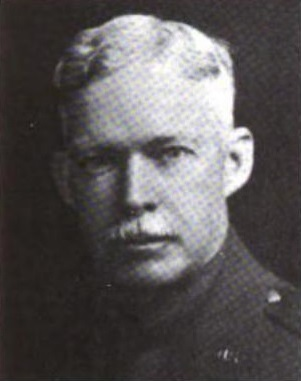
- From the Spring 1969 issue of Assembly magazine
- Born: January 30, 1873; Eufaula, Alabama
- Died: July 2, 1969 (aged 96); Clearwater, Florida
- Burial place: Sylvan Abbey Memorial Park, Clearwater, Florida
- Spouse(s): Frances Farrell (m, 1899-1955, her death)
- Children: 2
- Military career
- Allegiance: United States
- Branch: United States Army
- Service years: 1894–1937
- Rank: Brigadier general
- Service number: 0-456
- Conflicts: Spanish–American War; Philippine–American War
- Awards: Silver Star

George Henson Estes Jr. (January 30, 1873 – July 2, 1969) was a United States Army officer in the late 19th and early 20th centuries.

== Biography ==
Estes was born on January 30, 1873, in Eufaula, Alabama, the son of George Henson Estes Sr. (1848–1918) and his wife, Anna Georgia (Thornton) Estes (1853–1929). He had seven younger siblings: Mary, Edith Gray, William Thornton, Thomas Gray, Claude Hugh, Charles Richard, and Martha, who married United States Army officer John L. DeWitt.

He attended the University of Georgia before entering the United States Military Academy, which he graduated from in 1894. He was commissioned into the infantry.

Estes participated in the Santiago Campaign during the Spanish–American War, and he served in the Sanitary Corps while in Cuba. He participated in the Philippine–American War. From 1914 to 1917, he served as the treasurer and quartermaster at the USMA. On August 8, 1918, after being transferred to the Inspector General's Department, Estes was promoted to the rank of brigadier general. He graduated from the United States Army Command and General Staff College in 1920 and from the United States Army War College in 1921. On January 2, 1929, Estes was permanently promoted to brigadier general, and he served as the commandant of the United States Army Infantry School from May 4, 1929, to May 31, 1937.

Estes retired from the army on January 1, 1937, because of disabilities. He moved to Clearwater, Florida, where he lived until his death on July 2, 1969.

== Personal life ==
Estes married Frances Farrell on January 4, 1899, and together they had two children. Frances Farrell's sister Florence was the wife of Brigadier General James Anderson Irons.
