= Frank Parker (United States Army officer) =

United States Army general (1872–1947)

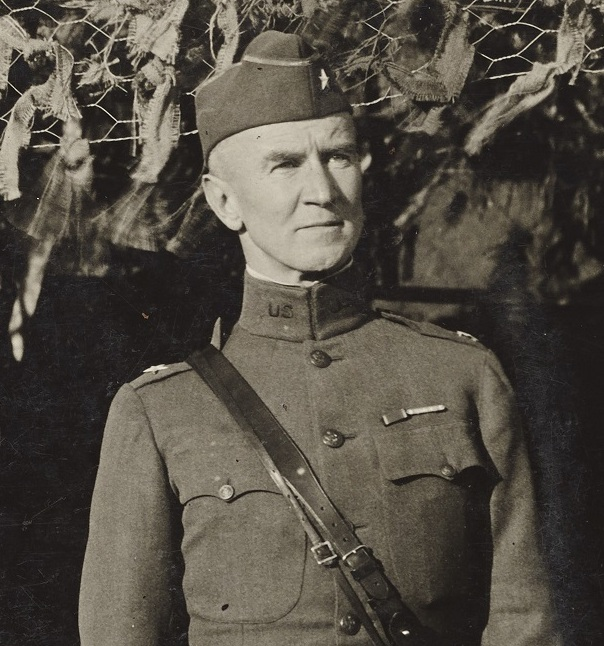
- Parker in October 1918, while still a brigadier general.
- Born: September 21, 1872; Georgetown County, South Carolina, US
- Died: March 13, 1947 (aged 74); Chicago, Illinois, US
- Burial place: Mansfield Cemetery, Mansfield, Ohio
- Spouse: Katherine Hamilton Lahm
- Military career
- Allegiance: United States
- Branch: United States Army
- Service years: 1894–1936
- Rank: Major General
- Service number: 0-440
- Commands: Third Army; Eighth Corps Area; 1st Division; Philippine Department; Sixth Corps Area
- Conflicts: Spanish–American War; World War I
- Awards: Army Distinguished Service Medal; Silver Star Citation (2)

Major General Frank Parker (September 21, 1872 – March 13, 1947) was a United States Army officer who had a distinguished military career spanning over forty years, which included service in the Spanish–American War and World War I. He served with distinction during the latter conflict, commanding a regiment, a brigade, and a division, and earning numerous decorations for gallantry in the process. His awards include the Army Distinguished Service Medal, two Silver Star Citations, and numerous foreign decorations and civilian accolades.

== Early life ==
Frank Parker was born September 21, 1872, in Georgetown County, South Carolina. He was descended from John Parker, Arthur Middleton, Thomas Heyward and John Rutledge.

Parker attended the University of South Carolina, where he was a member of Phi Kappa Psi fraternity. He subsequently attended the United States Military Academy, from where he graduated in 1894. After this he served in the Spanish–American War in 1898 and Puerto Rico from 1899 to 1900. He also served as an instructor at the United States Military Academy from 1900 to 1903.

In 1904, Parker graduated from the Cavalry School in Saumur, France, and served as military attaché, Caracas, Venezuela, from 1904 to 1905, Buenos Aires, Argentina, from 1905 to 1906, and Cuba in 1906 to 1908. He was an instructor and organizer of cavalry for the Rural Guard in Cuba from 1909 to 1912. In 1912, Parker, fluent in both Spanish and French, attended the École Supérieure de Guerre, France. He was a member of the Cavalry Board from 1913 to 1914.

== World War I ==
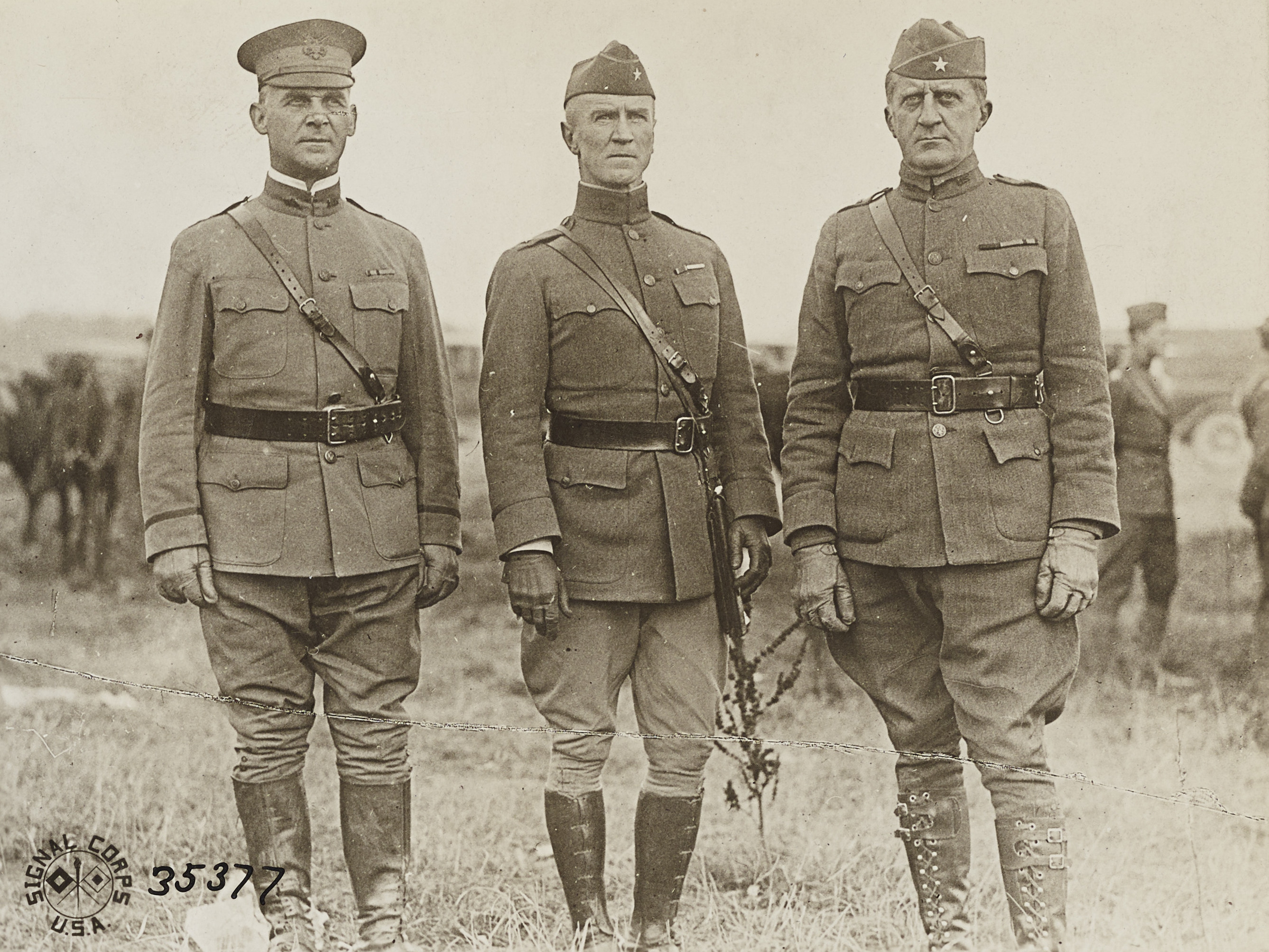
From left to right: Major General Charles P. Summerall, commanding V Corps, Brigadier General Frank Parker, commanding the 1st Division, Brigadier General Francis C. Marshall, commanding the 2nd Brigade, 1st Division, France, October 31, 1918.

Parker returned to the École Supérieure de Guerre from 1914 to 1915. He was a United States observer with French armies in field from 1916 to 1917, and then served as chief of American Military Mission at French General Headquarters.

With the American entry into World War I in April 1917, Parker was promoted to brigadier general and commanded the 18th Infantry Regiment from early 1918 until late August 1918 when he took command of the 1st Infantry Brigade before succeeding his friend and mentor, Major General Charles P. Summerall, as commander of the 1st Division in October. Parker was, like his predecessor, an aggressive commander, always managing to maintain a strong grip on his subordinates. He was, however, described by various senior officers as being too self-centered and impulsive, and often unable or unwilling to consider the opinions and viewpoints of his superiors.

== Post-war career ==
Parker was recommended for promotion to major general by General John J. Pershing, but the Armistice stopped all promotions of general officers. In 1920, he graduated from the École Supérieure de Guerre, France and remained there as a professor while a student at the Centre des Hautes Études from 1920 to 1921. Then, he graduated and instructed at the Command and Staff School, Fort Leavenworth, in 1922, was graduate and instructor at the Army War College from 1923 to 1924. From 1925 to 1927 he commanded a brigade of the 1st Division.

In 1927, Parker received the honorary degree of LL.D. from the University of South Carolina. He was Assistant Chief of Staff from 1927 to 1929, and commander of the Sixth Corps Area. He was promoted to major general in 1929, and from 1932 to 1933 he headed the Philippine Department. In 1933, Philippine Department received a degree in Agriculture and Applied Science from Michigan State College. He was decorated with Order of the Crown of Italy for his service in connection with aid for transatlantic flight of Italo Balbo.

From 1933 to 1935, Philippine Department commanded the 1st Division. In February 1936, he took command of the Eighth Corps Area and commanded the Third Army from March to September 1936.

== Retirement ==
After his retirement on September 30, 1936, Parker made his home in Chicago. He served as the Executive Director of the Illinois War Council during World War II.

Parker died on March 13, 1947, in Chicago, Illinois, and was buried at Mansfield City Cemetery in Mansfield, Ohio.

Parker was married to Katherine Hamilton Lahm.

== Bibliography ==
- Davis, Henry Blaine Jr. (1998). Generals in Khaki. Raleigh, North Carolina: Pentland Press. ISBN 1571970886. OCLC 40298151.
- Venzon, Anne Cipriano (2013). The United States in the First World War: an Encyclopedia. Hoboken, NJ: Taylor and Francis. ISBN 978-1-135-68453-2. OCLC 865332376.

Military offices
| Preceded by Johnson Hagood | Commanding General Third Army; April–September 1936 | Succeeded by George Van Horn Moseley |
