= Tschappat =

Tschappat or Tschäppät is a surname. Notable people with the surname include:

- Alexander Tschäppät (1952–2018), Swiss politician
- Reynold Tschäppät (1917–1979), Swiss politician
- William H. Tschappat (1874–1955), career officer in the United States Army
