= Walter Wallace =

Walter Wallace may refer to:

- Walter Wallace (died 2020), black man fatally shot by police in Philadelphia, U.S.
- Walter Ian James Wallace, British civil servant
- Walter Wallace, NASCAR driver in 1976 Music City USA 420
- Walter Wallace, character in American medical drama television series Pure Genius

== See also ==
- Watty Wallace (1900–1964), Australian politician
- Walter Wallace Singer (1911–1992), American football player
- Wal Wallace or Pierre Carl Ouellet (born 1967), Canadian professional wrestler
