= Tully McCrea =

United States Army general (1839–1918)

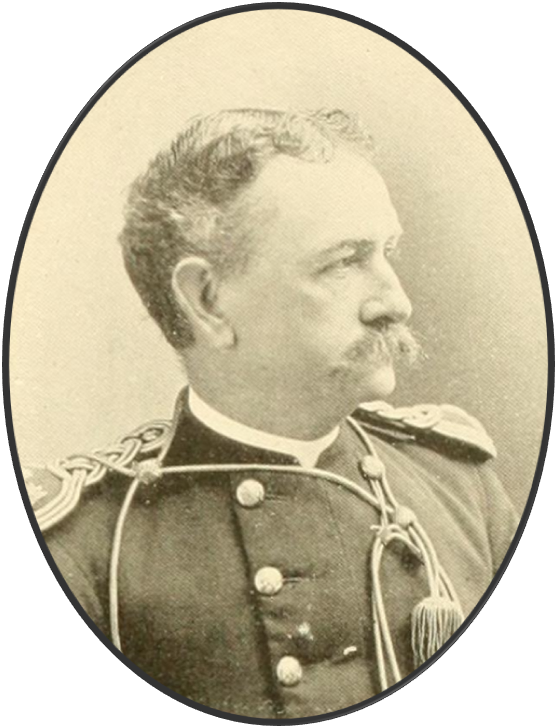
- Born: July 23, 1839; Natchez, Mississippi, US
- Died: September 5, 1918 (aged 79); West Point, New York, US
- Burial place: West Point Cemetery; West Point, New York, US
- Spouse(s): Harriet Hale Camp (m. 1868)
- Relatives: William Harvey Tschappat (son-in-law)
- Military career
- Allegiance: United States
- Branch: United States Army; Union Army
- Service years: 1862–1903
- Rank: Brigadier General
- Units: 1st U.S. Artillery 42nd U.S. Infantry Regiment; 5th U.S. Artillery 6th U.S. Artillery
- Commands: Battery I, 1st U.S. Artillery; Fort Columbus; Fort Canby; Fort Slocum; Fort Hancock; Fort Wadsworth; Cartel de Espana, Manila, PI; Artillery District of Puget Sound
- Conflicts: American Civil War: Peninsula Campaign; Maryland Campaign; Battle of Antietam; Battle of Fredericksburg; Battle of Chancellorsville; Battle of Gettysburg; Battle of Olustee (WIA); Great Railroad Strike of 1877

Tully McCrea (July 23, 1839 – September 5, 1918) was a career United States Army artillery officer and graduate of the United States Military Academy at West Point (Class of 1862) who served in the American Civil War. He was promoted multiple times for gallant and meritorious service in battle, rising during the course of the war from the rank of second lieutenant to brevet major.

McCrea commanded Battery I, 1st U.S. Artillery at the Battle of Gettysburg after his commanding officer, Lieutenant George A. Woodruff, was mortally wounded.

== Biography ==
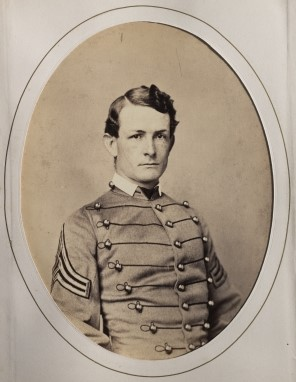
Cadet Tully McCrea at West Point, between 1858 and 1862

=== Civil War service ===
McCrea was born in Mississippi, from where he was appointed to the United States Military Academy at West Point in 1858 as a member of the Class of 1862. He graduated 14th out of 28 cadets.

Upon graduation in June 1862, the American Civil War was already in progress: McCrea was commissioned as a second lieutenant with Battery I, 1st U.S. Artillery and sent to join the Peninsula Campaign, then underway in Virginia. He was breveted to the rank of first lieutenant citing "gallant and meritorious service" at the Battle of Antietam on September 17, 1862.

McCrea was engaged with Battery I at Fredericksburg and Chancellorsville; at Gettysburg, he assumed command of the battery after his commanding officer was mortally wounded in action. For this service, he was again breveted to the rank of captain on July 3, 1863.

Following Gettysburg, he was transferred to Battery K and later Battery M, 1st U.S. Artillery, sent to the Carolinas and Florida. He participated in the Battle of Olustee, where he was severely wounded in action when shot through the legs. He was brevetted once more to the rank of major on February 20, 1864, for his service at Olustee.

The severity of his wounds compelled him to take a leave of absence which lasted throughout most of 1864; upon his return to active duty, McCrea was an instructor at West Point.

=== Post-war life and career ===
Post-war, McCrea was promoted to the permanent rank of captain and attached to the 42nd U.S. Infantry in 1866 on mustering duty.

In 1870, McCrea rejoined the 1st U.S. Artillery, and later transferred to the 5th U.S. Artillery where he was promoted to the rank of major in 1888 and lieutenant colonel in 1898. He commanded multiple garrison posts across the United States, including Fort Columbus, New York, Fort Slocum, New York, Fort Hancock, New Jersey, Fort Wadsworth, New York, and Fort Canby, Washington.

McCrea was promoted to colonel of the 6th U.S. Artillery in July 1900.

After more than forty years of military service, he retired on February 22, 1903–one day after he was promoted to the rank of brigadier general.

== Personal life ==
McCrea was married to Harriet "Hattie" Camp in 1868. They had a daughter, Mary Alice, born in 1870. Alice McCrea was married to Lieutenant William Harvey Tschappat, 5th U.S. Artillery, in July 1898.

McCrea's wife died in 1917, after which he moved in to his daughter and son-in-law's home at West Point, New York.

McCrea died on September 5, 1918, at West Point, New York at the age of 79.
