= Levin H. Campbell Jr. =

United States Army general

Levin Hicks Campbell Jr.
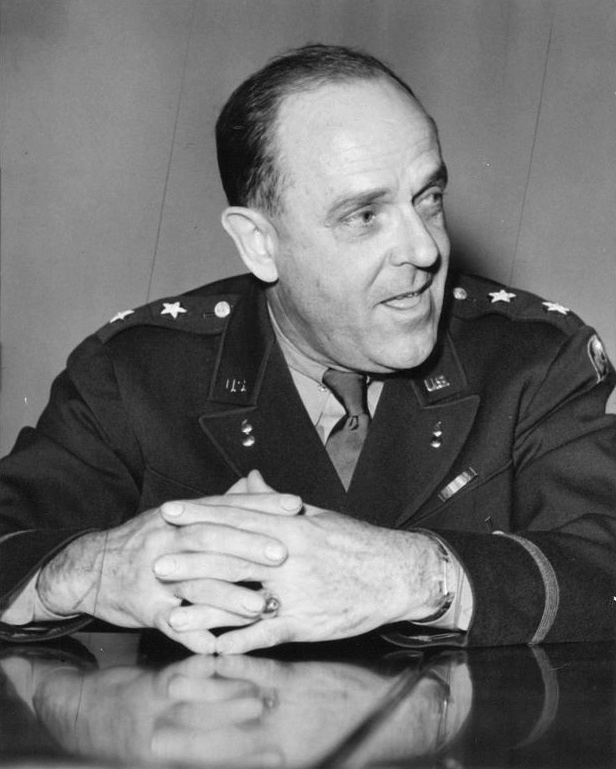
- Major General Campbell at a press conference in December, 1942
- Born: November 23, 1886; Washington, D.C., U.S.
- Died: November 17, 1976 (aged 89); Annapolis, Maryland, U.S.
- Burial place: United States Naval Academy Cemetery, Annapolis
- Military career
- Allegiance: United States of America
- Branch: United States Army
- Service years: 1911 – 1946
- Rank: Lieutenant general
- Service number: 0-3194
- Commands: 16th Chief of Ordnance (1942-1946)
- Conflicts: World War I; World War II
- Awards: Distinguished Service Medal (2); Order of the British Empire
- Other work: Business Executive

Levin Hicks Campbell Jr. (November 23, 1886 – November 17, 1976) was a lieutenant general in the United States Army. He was the 16th Chief of Ordnance for the U.S. Army Ordnance Corps.

== Biography ==
The son of U.S. Court of Patent Appeals Judge Levin Hicks Campbell Sr. (1860–1955), Levin Hicks Campbell Jr. was born on November 23, 1886, in Washington, D.C. He graduated from the U.S. Naval Academy in 1909. Upon graduation, he resigned from the Navy and accepted a job with United States Steel. In 1911, he joined the Army and was commissioned as a second lieutenant in the Army's Coast Artillery. Campbell's first Ordnance assignment came as a captain in April 1918 when he served in the Office of the Chief of Ordnance during World War I.

After the war Campbell continued his service in the Ordnance Branch; including assignments at: the Office of the Chief of Ordnance, Washington, D.C.; Stockton Ordnance Depot, Stockton, California; Aberdeen Proving Ground, Maryland; and Rock Island Arsenal, Illinois. As a career ordnance officer, he specialized in the engineering and production of combat vehicles, small arms, artillery, and ammunition. He was commended for successfully automating the artillery ammunition assembly line at Frankford Arsenal, Pennsylvania, while assigned there from 1939 to 1940.

In 1940, Campbell was promoted to brigadier general and appointed assistant chief of ordnance for facilities, where he supervised the planning and construction of new munitions factories across the country, particularly for the production and chemicals and explosives, and the loading of ammunition. Most were built by the government and operated under contract for the Ordnance Department. In January 1942, he was placed in charge of all industrial production and was promoted to major general in spring 1942.

On June 1, 1942, Campbell was named as the 16th chief of ordnance. Among his major accomplishments in that post was the development of what he called the 'Industry-Ordnance Team'. To improve manufacturing techniques, Campbell brought in some of the best people from science and industry. The development, production, and maintenance of Army Ordnance became a $30 billion-a-year industry during World War II. By decentralizing his department's administrative structure, Campbell was able to overcome many of the unprecedented difficulties faced by the Ordnance Department in its responsibilities to arm and equip the Army in World War II.

Given the temporary rank of lieutenant general in April 1946, Campbell retired as a major general in May 1946. He was advanced to lieutenant general on the retired list in June 1948. Campbell's decorations included two awards of the Distinguished Service Medal. He wrote The Industry-Ordnance Team in 1946 recounting the Allied effort to produce and deliver weapons, vehicles, and munitions for World War II.

After his military retirement, Campbell was involved with several civilian businesses, including appointment as Executive Vice President of the International Harvester company in Chicago, Illinois and serving on the boards of directors of the Curtiss-Wright Corporation and American Steel Foundries. He was also chairman of the board of trustees of the Automotive Safety Foundation.

General Campbell died in Annapolis, Maryland on November 17, 1976. He was buried in Section 02, Lot 0336 of the United States Naval Academy Cemetery in Annapolis, Maryland.

In 1972 Campbell was inducted into the Ordnance Corps Hall of Fame. The U.S. Army Ordnance Corps Association's Levin Hicks Campbell Jr. Distinguished Award of Merit is named for him.

== Sources ==
- U. S. Army Register, published by U.S. Army Adjutant General's Office, 1911, page 643
- Army List and Directory, published by U.S. Army Adjutant General's Office, 1919, page 77
- The Story of Ordnance in the World War, by Sevellon Brown, 1920, page 153
- Newspaper article, Give Dinner for Major Campbell, Davenport (Iowa) Democrat And Leader, May 26, 1927
- Magazine article, Army Chief for Ordnance, Time Magazine, June 1, 1942
- Newspaper article, Gen. Campbell is Nominated Army Ordnance Chief, Chicago Tribune, May 21, 1942
- Historic American Engineering Record (HAER), Ford's Richmond Assembly Plant, Chapter 4, http://www.rosietheriveter.org/FordBldgReport/Chapter4WWIIPart1.pdf
- Newspaper article, U.S. Rocket Developed: We Surpass Germans in Work on Weapon, The New York Times, December 17, 1943
- Newspaper article, Joins American Steel Foundries, New York Times, November 21, 1948
- Military Times, Hall of Valor, List of Recipients of the Distinguished Service Medal, https://web.archive.org/web/20120525055629/http://homeofheroes.com/valor/02_awards/index_dsm/00_armyDSM-index.html
- Pentagon Politics, by William Haynie Neblett, 1953, page 34
- Who's Who in Commerce and Industry, 1953, Volume 9, page 242
- Newspaper article, Retired General Elected To Curtiss-Wright Board, The New York Times, April 25, 1952
- Traffic Digest and Review Magazine, 1953, Volumes 1 and 2, page 20
- Newspaper article, Obituary, Levin H. Campbell, New York Times, April 16, 1955
- U.S. Army Register, U.S. Army Adjutant General's Office, 1962, Volume 1
- Newspaper article, Levin H. Campbell, Ordnance General: Administered Gigantic Armament Program for World War II, Foresaw Rockets Role, by Werner Bamberger, New York Times, November 18, 1976
- United States Naval Academy Cemetery Documentation Project, Levin Hicks Campbell Jr. fact sheet dated June 15, 2005, http://www.usna.edu/cemetery/PDF%20Files/Section%203/0336-%20Campbell,%20L.%20H.,%20Jr.pdf
- U.S. Army Ordnance Corps web site, Hall of Fame Inductees By Year page, https://web.archive.org/web/20091227055442/http://www.goordnance.apg.army.mil/sitefiles/HOFInducteesbyYear.htm
- U.S. Army Ordnance Corps Association web site, awards page, http://www.usaocaweb.org/awards.htm
- Generals of World War II

Military offices
Preceded by Major General Charles M. Wesson	Chief of Ordnance of the United States Army; 1942 - 1946	Succeeded by Major General Everett S. Hughes
