= Horace F. Bigelow =

United States Army general

Horace Freeman Bigelow
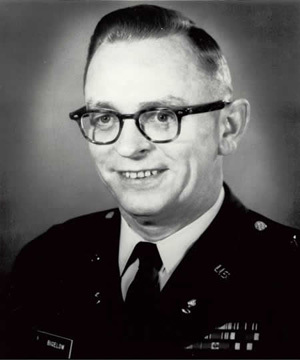
- Major General Horace F. Bigelow
- Military career
- Allegiance: United States
- Branch: United States Army
- Service years: 1932–1965
- Rank: Major General
- Commands: Chief of Ordnance; 232nd Base Depot
- Conflicts: World War II
- Awards: Army Distinguished Service Medal (2)

Major General Horace Freeman Bigelow (January 30, 1908 – December 14, 1970) was a career officer in the United States Army who served as the 21st Chief of Ordnance for the United States Army Ordnance Corps.

== Early life ==
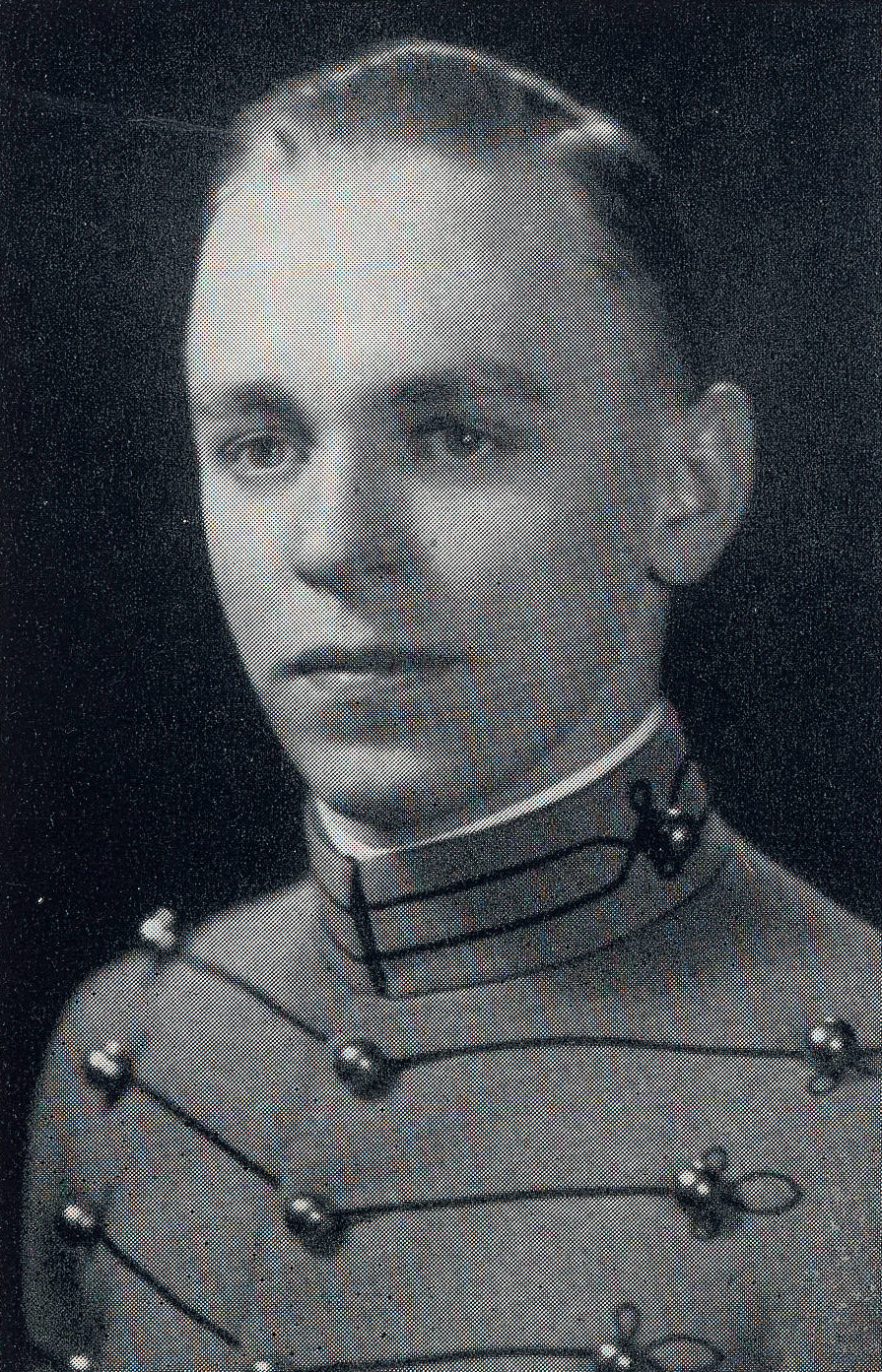
Bigelow as a West Point cadet in 1932

Bigelow was born in Dorchester, Massachusetts, on January 30, 1908, the son of a farmer. His family moved to North Westminster, Vermont, when Horace was a child. Following graduation from high school and a year and a half at Norwich University, Bigelow entered the United States Military Academy at West Point, where he graduated 121st in a class of 262 Cadets in June 1932.

== Military career ==
Upon assignment to the Field Artillery branch, Bigelow spent several years as battery officer at Fort Ethan Allen, Vermont, and at Schofield Barracks, Hawaii. Following his recovery from tuberculosis at Fitzsimmons Army Hospital in Denver, he attended the Field Artillery School at Fort Sill, Oklahoma, and graduated from it in 1937. Next, he became the Officer-in-Charge of the West Point Preparatory School at III Corps Headquarters, Fort McPherson, Georgia. From 1939 to 1942, he served in a variety of capacities as a member of the 83rd Field Artillery at Fort Bragg, North Carolina; including, battery officer, battery commander, battalion staff officer, and battalion commander.

Bigelow transferred to the Ordnance branch in March 1942 and attended a course at Aberdeen Proving Ground. Following this course, he attended the Command and General Staff School at Fort Leavenworth, Kansas. In August 1942, he was assigned as the Ordnance Officer for the 102nd Infantry at Camp Maxey, Texas and was promoted to lieutenant colonel. Following an assignment with the XVIth Corps at Fort Riley, Kansas in December 1943, he served as the Assistant Ordnance officer at headquarters, Second Army in Memphis, Tennessee from June until August 1944. He then went overseas to serve with the Army Ground Forces Board in the Mediterranean Theater from August 1944 to February 1945; after which, he was named as the Ordnance Supply Officer, Headquarters Peninsular Base Section in Italy from February 1945 until April 1945. He assumed command of the 232nd Base Depot in April 1945 and was promoted to colonel. He became the Deputy Ordnance Officer, Peninsular Base Section in November 1945 and Chief Ordnance Officer for the Peninsular Bay Section and Allied Force Headquarters, Mediterranean Theater of Operations, Italy in January 1946. He culminated his service overseas in April 1947, when he was named Chief Ordnance Officer, Headquarters, Mediterranean Theater.

Upon return to the United States in November 1947, Bigelow was assigned as the Executive Officer for the Ordnance Board at Aberdeen Proving Ground and moved to become the Executive Officer to the Commanding General of Aberdeen Proving Ground in October 1948. After his assignment as Executive Officer, he served several assignments at Aberdeen Proving Ground; to include, assistant director of Development and Proof Services Division and Chief of the Arms and Ammunition Division. In 1950, he attended the Army War College. Following graduation from the Army War College in 1951, Bigelow was assigned to the Field Service Division at Aberdeen Proving Ground.

Bigelow became the commander of the Letterkenny Ordnance Depot in August 1954 and was promoted to brigadier general. In August 1955, he went to Tokyo, Japan to become the Chief Ordnance Officer at the headquarters of United States Army Forces, Far East Eighth Army Rear. Two years later, he was assigned as the Chief Ordnance Officer for United States Army Japan and United Nations Command Eighth Army in Japan. His last assignment in Japan was as the Assistant Chief of Staff, G4, Headquarters US Army, Japan, United Nations Command, Eighth United States Army (Rear).

Upon his return to the United States in September 1958, Bigelow became Chief of the Office of Manpower within the Office of the Chief of Ordnance. Four months later, he became the Assistant Chief of Ordnance for Manpower. In February 1960, he became the Deputy Chief of Ordnance and was promoted to major general. On June 1, 1962, Bigelow became the 21st Chief Of Ordnance upon the retirement of Lieutenant General John Hinrichs, the previous Chief of Ordnance. However, Bigelow's tenure lasted only two months due to the reorganization of the army logistical functions as directed by Secretary of Defense Robert McNamara and the recommendations of Project 80, also known as the Hoelscher Committee Report.

Bigelow remained on active duty and became the Assistant Deputy Chief of Staff for Logistics (Programs) within the Office of the Deputy Chief of Staff for Logistics at the Pentagon. After this two-year assignment, he retired in 1964. One year later, in October 1965, Bigelow was recalled to active duty as Vice Chairman of the Army Logistics Systems Study Group within the Office of the Chief of Staff of the Army. This assignment lasted for approximately one year. Following this, he retired for the second time. He unexpectedly died on December 14, 1970, as a result of choking on a piece of food.

Military offices
Preceded by John Honeycutt Hinrichs	Chief of Ordnance of the United States Army; 1962	Succeeded by William Estel Potts
