= 1st U.S. Artillery, Battery I =

- Active: 1821–1901
- Country: United States
- Allegiance: United States; Union
- Branch: United States Army; Field Artillery Branch (United States)
- Engagements: Second Seminole War Creek War of 1836; Mexican–American War; American Civil War: First Battle of Bull Run; Battle of Ball's Bluff; Siege of Yorktown; Battle of Seven Pines; Seven Days Battles; Battle of Savage's Station; Battle of White Oak Swamp; Battle of Malvern Hill; Battle of Antietam; Battle of Fredericksburg; Battle of Chancellorsville; Battle of Gettysburg; Bristoe Campaign; Mine Run Campaign; Battle of the Wilderness; Battle of North Anna; Battle of Totopotomoy Creek; Battle of Cold Harbor; Battle of Trevilian Station; Battle of Saint Mary's Church; Siege of Petersburg; Battle of Peebles' Farm; Battle of Boydton Plank Road; Appomattox Campaign; Battle of Five Forks; Battle of Sailor's Creek; Battle of Appomattox Court House; Great Railroad Strike of 1877

Battery I, 1st Regiment of United States Artillery was a field artillery battery of the United States Army between 1821 and 1901 that notably served in the Union Army during the American Civil War.

== Service history ==
=== Early history ===
The company was organized in June 1821 at Fort Constitution, New Hampshire under the command of Captain Fabius Whiting.

It was posted at various East Coast installations in garrison through 1836, when the company was deployed to Fort Mitchell, Alabama and was sent into the field during the Creek War of 1836.

Shortly thereafter, the company was deployed to Florida, where it joined the campaign during the Second Seminole War from 1836 until 1838.

Equipped as a field artillery battery, the unit participated in the Mexican–American War from 1847 until 1848, joining the campaign under the command of Captain John Bankhead Magruder during the siege of Vera Cruz and engaged at the battles of Cerro Gordo, Contreras, Churubusco, Molino del Rey, and Mexico City.

In 1850, Battery I was ordered to the Pacific Coast to take post at San Diego, California; the unit remained in California through 1855, when it was ordered to join the United States Boundary Survey en route to Texas.

In 1857, the company returned to the Atlantic Coast, where it was stationed at Fort Adams in Rhode Island.

The battery was ordered to Fort Leavenworth in Kansas, along with much of the rest of the U.S. Army in 1859, where it remained until January 1861 before moving to Washington, D.C. to defend the national capital from Confederate Army attack during the American Civil War.

=== Civil War ===
Upon the outbreak of the American Civil War, Captain Magruder resigned his commission and joined the Confederacy. Command of Battery I was given to Captain James B. Ricketts, who led the battery at the Battle of Bull Run; Ricketts was severely wounded in action and captured, and command soon passed to Lieutenant Edmund Kirby Jr., who led the battery through the Peninsula Campaign, Antietam, and Fredericksburg before he was killed at the Battle of Chancellorsville.

Lieutenant George Woodruff led the company at the Battle of Gettysburg in Gettysburg, Pennsylvania, where he was killed in action. Lieutenant Tully McCrea briefly commanded the battery after Gettysburg, and was replaced by Lieutenant Francis "Frank" Sands French.

In October 1863, Captain Ricketts, who was absent since July 1861, was replaced with Captain Alanson Merwin Randol; Randol, who had commanded Battery E & G, 1st U.S. of the Horse Artillery Brigade since 1862, trained and refitted Battery I as a horse artillery battery, and in April 1864 it was merged with Battery H, 1st U.S. to create Battery H & I, 1st U.S.

Battery H & I served for the remainder of the war as a horse artillery battery, typically attached to the Cavalry Division. It was present during the Wilderness Campaign of 1864, including the Battle of Cold Harbor in June 1864.

Captain Randol left the battery for West Point in August 1864, and later accepted a volunteer commission; for the rest of the war, the company was commanded by its lieutenants.

=== Post-Civil War ===
After the Civil War's end, the battery was posted on garrison duty at a variety of bases across the United States: at Fort Brown, Texas from 1865 to 1869; at Fort Trumbull, Connecticut from 1869 to 1870; at Fort Delaware, Delaware in 1870; at Fort Wood, New York from 1870 to 1872; at Key West Barracks, Florida from 1872 to 1875; and at Fort Warren, Massachusetts from 1875 to 1881.

In November 1881, the company was transferred to the Department of the Pacific: it was posted at Fort Canby, Washington Territory, 1881–1882, Fort Stevens, Oregon, 1882–1883, Fort Canby, Washington Territory, 1883–1884, Fort Alcatraz, California, 1884–1886, the Presidio, California, 1886–1890.

In 1890, the battery returned to the Atlantic Coast: it was posted at Fort Hamilton, New York, 1890–1896, Fort Monroe, Virginia, 1896–1898, and Fort Morgan, Alabama, 1898–1901.

The company was commanded by Captain William Montrose Graham from April 1872 until July 1879, Captain John C. White from July 1879 until October 1883, Captain Richard Shaw from October 1883 until June 1896, and Captain Robert Patterson from June 1896 until February 1901.

In February 1901, the regimental artillery service was dissolved and reorganized as the United States Artillery Corps: Battery I, 1st U.S. was converted to the Eighth Company, Coast Artillery.

== Detailed Civil War service ==
- The battery moved to Washington, D.C. between January 7 and January 29, 1861, and served duty there until July.
- It advanced on Manassas, Virginia, July 16–21, 1861 and engaged in the First Battle of Bull Run on July 21.
- It moved to Poolesville, Maryland August 7–15 and served duty there and at Edward's Ferry until March 1862.
- It engaged in the Battle of Ball's Bluff in Loudoun County, Virginia on October 21, 1861 and Edward's Ferry October 22.
- It was ordered to the Virginia Peninsula in March 1862 and participated in the Siege of Yorktown from April 5 to May 4.
- It participated in the Battle of Seven Pines in Henrico County, Virginia from May 31 to June 1.
- It participated in the Seven Days Battles near Richmond from June 25 to July 1.
- It was stationed at The Peach Orchard and Savage Station on July 29, at the Battle of White Oak Swamp and the Battle of Glendale on June 30, and at Malvern Hill on July 1.
- It moved to Alexandria, Virginia from August 16 to August 23 and participated in the Maryland Campaign from September 6 to September 22, the Battle of Antietam from September 16 to September 17.
- It was at Harpers Ferry until October 30 and then moved to Falmouth, Virginia from October 30 to November 17.
- It participated in the Battle of Fredericksburg from December 11 to December 15 and the Mud March from January 20 to January 24, 1863.
- It was at Falmouth until April and participated in the Chancellorsville Campaign from April 27 to May 6, including the Battle of Chancellorsville from May 1–5.
- It participated in the Gettysburg Campaign from June 11 to July 24, including the Battle of Gettysburg, the bloodiest battle of the Civil War, from July 1 to July 3 in Gettysburg, Pennsylvania.
- It later advanced to the Rapidan from September 13 to September 17 and participated in the Bristoe Campaign from October 9 to October 22, including Bristoe Station on October 14. *It advanced to he Rappahannock on November 7 and November 8 and participated in the Mine Run Campaign from November 26 to December 2, including the Campaign from the Rapidan to the James River.
- It participated in the Battle of the Wilderness from May 5 to May 7 and the Battle of Spotsylvania Court House from May 8 to May 21, the Battle of North Anna from May 23 to 26, and the Battle of Totopotomoy Creek from May 28 to May 31.
- It participated in the Battle of Cold Harbor June 1 to June 7, and then was at Gaines's Mill, Salem Church, and Haw's Shop on June 2.
- It participated in Sheridan's Trevilian Raid from June 7 to June 24, including the Battle of Trevilian Station from June 11 to June 12.
- It was at Black Creek, Tunstall Station, the White House, or St. Peter's Church on June 21 and then at St. Mary's Church on June 24.
- It was at Light House Point from June 29 to July 27 and at Camp Barry in Washington, D.C. until September. It was at Arthur's Swamp on September 29, Poplar Springs Church from September 29 to October 1, and Wyatt's Road on October 1.
- It was at Boydton Plank Road from October 27 to October 28 and then participated in Warren's Raid on Weldon Railroad from December 7 to December 12 and was at Dabney's Mills from February 5 to February 7, 1865.
- It participated in the Appomattox Campaign from March 28 to April 9 and was at Dinwiddie Court House from March 30 to March 31, at Five Forks on April 1, and at Namozine Church on April 3.
- It was at Paine's Cross Roads on April 5, Sailor's Creek on April 6, Appomattox Court House on April 9, and then participated in the Lee and the Confederate Army's surrender. In May, it moved to Washington, D.C. and was part of the Grand Review of the Armies on May 23.

== Notable Commanders ==
- Captain John Bankhead Magruder
- Captain James Brewerton Ricketts – wounded in action and captured at the First Battle of Bull Run
- 1st Lieutenant Edmund Kirby Jr. – in command in Ricketts' absence, mortally wounded at the Battle of Chancellorsville
- 1st Lieutenant George Augustus Woodruff – replaced Kirby, mortally wounded at the Battle of Gettysburg
- 1st Lieutenant Tully McCrea – replaced Woodruff commanding battery at Gettysburg after Woodruff was mortally wounded; he briefly commanded the battery after the battle
- Captain Alanson Merwin Randol – succeeded Ricketts, October 1863 to August 1864, June 1865 to 1872.
- Captain William Montrose Graham

== See also ==
- List of United States Regular Army Civil War units
- 1st Air Defense Artillery Regiment
