= George B. Davis =

American legal writer and military officer

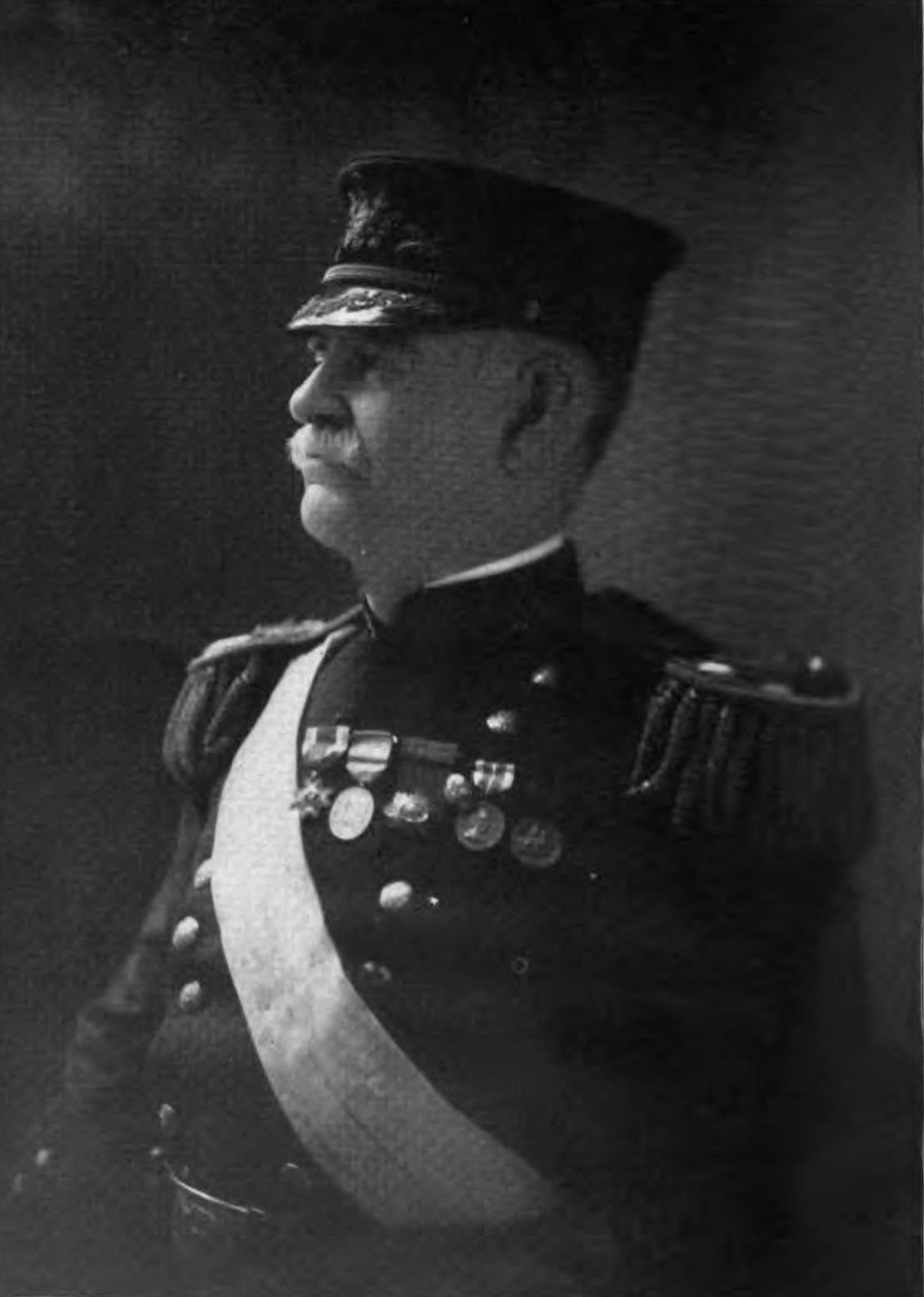
- Born: February 13, 1847; Ware
- Died: December 16, 1914 (aged 67); Adams Morgan
- Alma mater: George Washington University Law School; United States Military Academy; George Washington University Law School
- Position held: Judge Advocate General of the United States Army

George Breckenridge Davis (February 13, 1847 – December 16, 1914) was the tenth Judge Advocate General of the United States Army.

Davis was born at Ware, Massachusetts. In 1863, at the age of 16 years, he enlisted in the 1st Massachusetts Volunteer Cavalry. As a cavalryman and later a second lieutenant of volunteers, he served in 25 battles and engagements during the American Civil War.

Appointed to the United States Military Academy at West Point two years after the War, Davis graduated in 1871 and was commissioned a second lieutenant of the 5th U.S. Cavalry. After graduation, he married Ella Prince of West Springfield, Massachusetts. Their children included Mary Prince Davis, the wife of William Ruthven Smith, and Anne Dunbar Davis, the wife of Charles M. Wesson. After the wedding, Davis spent two years on the Wyoming and Arizona frontiers with the 5th Cavalry. His next tour was at West Point, where he served for five years as assistant professor of Spanish, teaching French, geology, chemistry and mineralogy as well. Promotion to 1st Lieutenant in 1878 brought with it another five-year tour on the Western frontier.

The return to West Point in 1883 gave Davis a chance to head the History Department as principal assistant professor, and to serve as assistant professor of law, instructing also in geography and ethics. During this tour, he completed his Outline of International Law. Simultaneously with his promotion, Captain Davis was rotated to the Western Territory in August 1888.

Only four months later, however, Davis's professional abilities were recognized and required in Washington. He was appointed a Major, Judge Advocate General's Department, and transferred to the Office of the Secretary of War. Davis took advantage of the Washington tour to obtain his LL.B. and LL.M. degrees at Columbian (now George Washington University) Law School. He was made Lieutenant Colonel and Deputy Judge Advocate General in 1895, but left Washington the next year to serve as Professor of Law at West Point.

It was during the next few years that Davis completed his major publications. His Elements of Law and Elements of International Law (1897) were followed by his definitive Treatise on the Military Law of the United States in 1898. In addition, Davis authored several historical and professional works on the tactical use of cavalry. The War of the Rebellion, a 70-volume compilation of the official records of the Union and Confederate Armies, was principally his work and was published in his name in 1880–1901. Davis was promoted to Colonel in 1901, and a few months later became a Brigadier and Judge Advocate General, a post he was to occupy for a decade. (His appointment followed that of Thomas F. Barr of Massachusetts and John W. Clous, a native of Germany, each of whom served as Judge Advocate General for one day in May 1901 in order to retire with the rank of Brigadier General.) General Davis guided his department through the Spanish–American War, and handled the investigation and trial of the notorious cases arising out of that war. He also represented the United States as delegate plenipotentiary to the Geneva Conventions of 1903 and 1906, and the Hague Convention of 1907. On February 14, 1911, General Davis retired with a promotion to major general.

He died on December 16, 1914, of heart disease at his home in the Adams Morgan section of Washington, D.C. Davis and his wife Ella Prince Davis were buried at the West Point Cemetery.
