= Charles M. Wesson =

United States Army general

Charles Macon Wesson
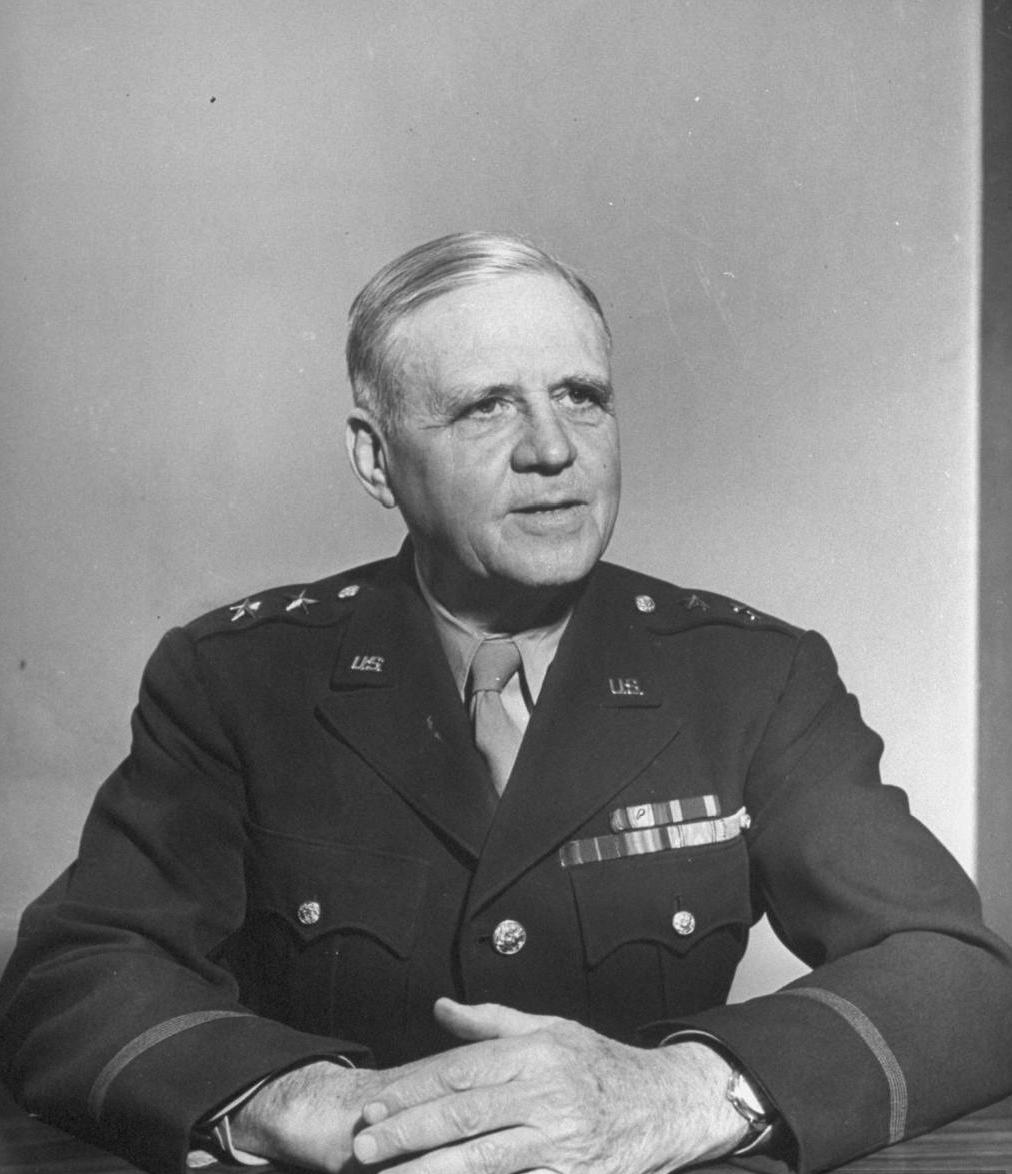
- Born: July 23, 1878; St. Louis, Missouri, U.S.
- Died: November 24, 1956 (aged 78); Washington, D.C., U.S.
- Military career
- Allegiance: United States of America
- Branch: United States Army
- Service years: 1900–1945
- Rank: Major general
- Service number: 0-1635
- Commands: 15th Chief of Ordnance (1938-1942)
- Conflicts: Philippine–American War; World War I World War II
- Awards: Distinguished Service Medal (3)

Signature
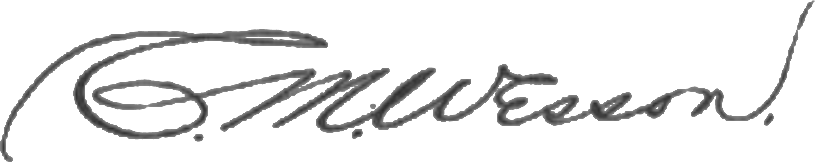

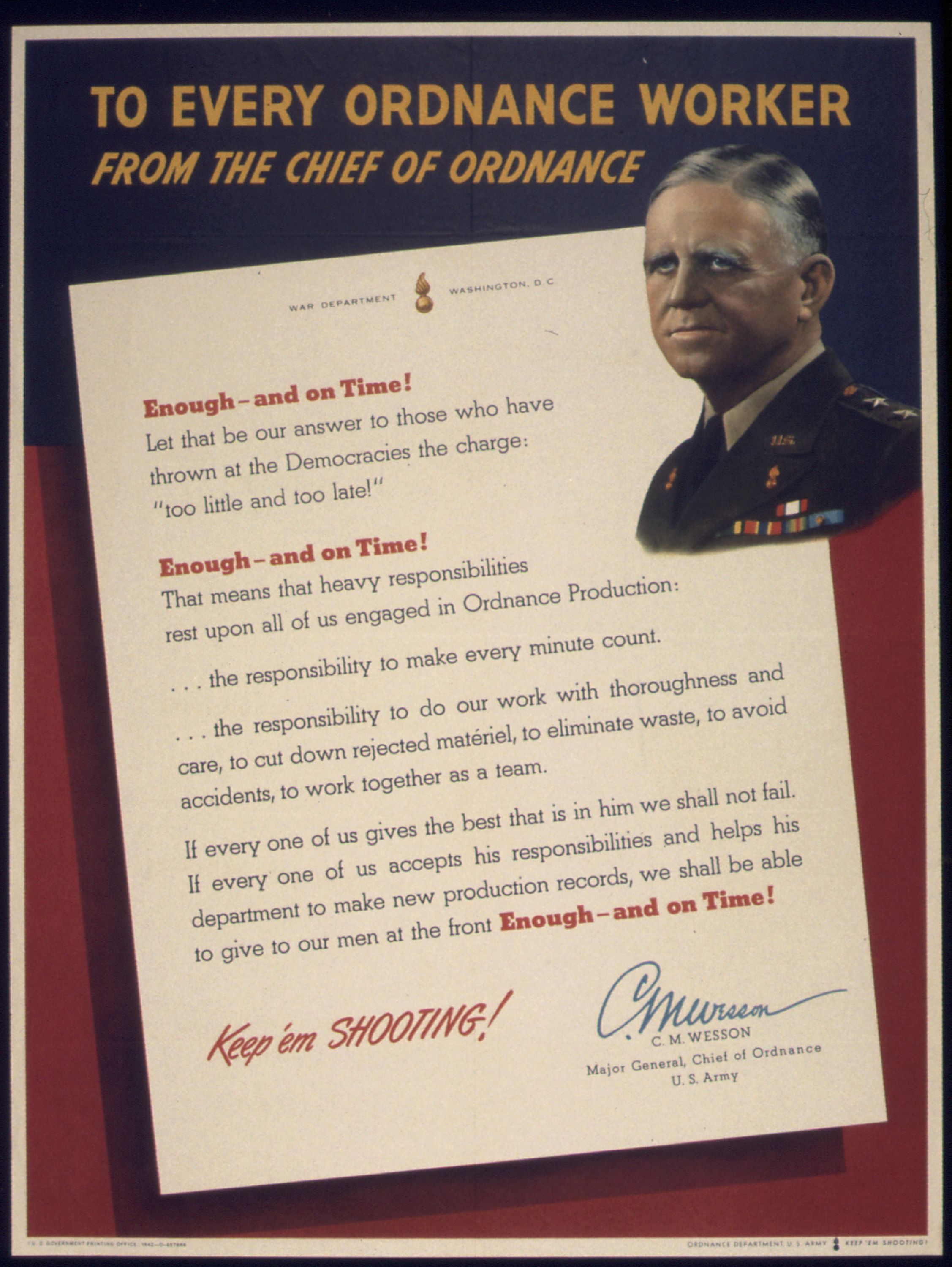
WWII poster, "To Every Ordnance Worker from the Chief of Ordnance. Enough - and on Time!"

Charles Macon Wesson (July 23, 1878 – November 24, 1956) was a major general in the United States Army and the Army's 15th Chief of Ordnance for the U.S. Army Ordnance Department from 1938 to 1942.

== Early life and education ==
Wesson was born in St. Louis, Missouri, on July 23, 1878. He later moved to Maryland and was admitted to the United States Military Academy at West Point, New York. Wesson played quarterback and defensive back on the football team. During his senior year, he recovered a fumbled punt and returned it 100 yards for a touchdown on a 110-yard field in the win against Syracuse and then made several key tackles in the win against Navy. Wesson graduated 21st in a class of 54 in 1900.

== Military career ==
Following graduation, Wesson was posted to the cavalry and saw service with the 7th and 8th Cavalry in Cuba and at Fort Riley, Kansas until July 1, 1903. He was then detailed as an instructor to West Point, where he remained for four years. On July 1, 1907, he was promoted to captain, detailed to the Ordnance Corps, and posted to Sandy Hook Proving Ground in New Jersey. From November 1907 until October 1918, Wesson was assigned to Watervliet Arsenal and Watertown Arsenal, except for brief temporary duty in England from June until September 1914. He graduated from the Ordnance School of Technology in 1911. Wesson was promoted to major and detailed to the Ordnance Department in August 1911, and a temporary lieutenant colonel of cavalry in August 1917. Transferred to the Ordnance Department in October 1917, he was promoted to colonel in January 1918. In that same month, he became commandant at Watertown Arsenal. From February 1918, he served concurrently as Ordnance Officer for the Department of the Northeast.

By November 1918, he was in France and in charge of the Construction and Maintenance Division for the American Expeditionary Forces (AEF) Ordnance staff section. Shortly thereafter, he became the commanding officer of the AEF facilities at Atelier de Mehun sur Yèvre, which included the ordnance repair shops for mobile artillery and small arms, the Ordnance General Supply Depot Number 6, and the Ordnance Construction Camp. As well, he was responsible for salvaging Army ordnance materiel used on the battlefield and processing it for shipment back to the United States. All ordnance personnel and materiel in France were eventually evacuated through this depot. These duties he discharged until July 1919, at which time he was sent to England on temporary duty.

He returned to the United States in August 1919 to assume command at Aberdeen Proving Ground, but elected to resign his commission before taking that post. He became vice-president of the American Clay Machinery Company, but resigned his position after nine months and reentered the Army as a major on July 1, 1920. His next four years were spent in the Office, Chief of Ordnance. In February 1924, as a lieutenant colonel, he went to the Army War College for 10 months and graduated in early 1925. He then took command of Aberdeen Proving Ground, the post he had originally been assigned to in 1919. His tour at Aberdeen Proving Ground concluded in March 1929, at which time he was posted to London, England, as assistant military attache.

Returning to Washington in September 1930, he was named chief of the Technical Staff in the Office, Chief of Ordnance. In July 1934, as a colonel, Wesson was sent back to Aberdeen Proving Ground for a second tour as its commandant.

Wesson was promoted two grades to major general in June 1938 and selected to be the 15th Chief of Ordnance for the Army. General Wesson assumed responsibility for the Army's materiel buildup in preparation for World War II. This was the largest American arms production program in history up to that time. General Wesson was awarded an honorary Doctorate in Engineering by Stevens Institute of Technology in 1941. Retiring from the Army in May 1942, General Wesson became senior assistant administrator for the Lend Lease Administration until 1943. Next, he served two years as chief of the Foreign Economic Division of that same agency before his second retirement in 1945. General Wesson died at Walter Reed Army Hospital in Washington on November 24, 1956, at the age of 78.

== Personal ==
Wesson married Anne Dunbar Davis on May 31, 1904, in Washington, D.C. She was the daughter of Army Judge Advocate General George B. Davis. They had a son and two daughters. Wesson suffered a head injury and his wife was killed as a result of the January 1922 Knickerbocker Theatre roof collapse. Their son died in March 1931.

In 1926, he married Virginia Rowland in Elkins Park, Pennsylvania. Wesson and his two wives were interred at the West Point Cemetery.

Military offices
Preceded by Major General William H. Tschappat	Chief of Ordnance of the United States Army; 1938 - 1942	Succeeded by Lieutenant General Levin H. Campbell Jr.
