= North African World Series =

The North African World Series (also known as the "GI World Series") was a best two-out-of-three-game baseball championship played on October 3 and 4, 1943, between the Casablanca Yankees and the Algiers Streetwalkers, drawn from the ranks of American soldiers and sailors stationed in North Africa during World War II.

== History ==
During World War II, Zeke Bonura, a major league baseball player, was posted to Oran, Algeria. He organized large-scale baseball operations, consisting of 150 teams in 6 leagues. Playoffs among the teams narrowed them to two finalists – the Casablanca Yankees, consisting of medics, with a season record of 32–2 in the Casablanca-Oran area, and the Algiers Streetwalkers, consisting of MPs, which had been 17–3 in the Algiers-Tunis League.

The North African World Series was a best two-out-of-three-game championship played on October 3 and 4, 1943, at St. Eugene municipal stadium in Algiers, Algeria, between the two teams. Attendance at the games was 4,000 people. Major General Everett Hughes, deputy theater commander, threw out the first ball.

The Casablanca Yankees won the series in two straight games. They won the first game 9–0, and then won the second game 7–6, after scoring three runs in the bottom of the ninth.

The best hitter in the series was Lieutenant Walt Singer, the only officer in the games, who played first base and also served as Casablanca's manager. A former Syracuse University All-American football player, Singer had also played football in the National Football League for the New York Giants. He had five hits, including the sole homer of the series, the pivotal hit in the second game.

Bonura promoted the North African World Series through coverage on the Armed Forces Radio Network. A play-by-play commentary of each game was broadcast by radio to all American military personnel in the Mediterranean theater. Press coverage appeared in the Armed Forces Weekly and the Stars and Stripes.

The winners were presented with baseballs autographed by General Dwight D. Eisenhower, and the winning team received a trophy made from an unexploded Italian bomb.
