= Elbert L. Ford =

United States Army general

Elbert Louis Ford
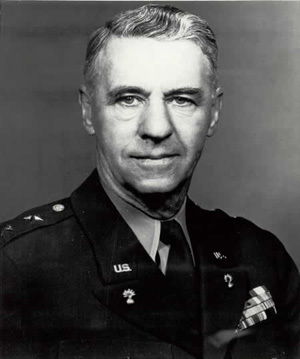
- Major General Elbert L. Ford
- Born: December 2, 1892; Milford, Connecticut, United States
- Died: February 25, 1990 (aged 97)
- Military career
- Allegiance: United States
- Branch: United States Army
- Service years: 1917–1953
- Rank: Major General
- Service number: 0-5251
- Units: Coast Artillery Corps; Ordnance Corps
- Commands: Chief of Ordnance of the United States Army
- Conflicts: World War I World War II
- Awards: Army Distinguished Service Medal; Legion of Merit

Major General Elbert Louis Ford (December 2, 1892 – February 25, 1990) was a career officer in the United States Army and served as the 18th Chief of Ordnance for the U.S. Army Ordnance Corps.

== Early life ==
Elbert Louis Ford was born in Milford, Connecticut, one of nine children. He briefly went in to farming, but was later admitted to United States Military Academy at West Point, New York. While at West Point, he played during the 1914–15 Army Cadets men's ice hockey season, 1915–16 Army Cadets men's ice hockey season, 1916–17 Army Cadets men's ice hockey season. He also played on the 1915 football team with Dwight D. Eisenhower. Ford graduated 39th in a class of 139 Cadets on April 20, 1917, exactly two weeks after the American entry into World War I.

== Military career ==
Upon graduation, Ford was assigned to the Coast Artillery branch and spent his first year as an officer watching Boston Harbor for possible German submarines. By August 1917, he was a temporary captain. After a very brief tour as regimental instructor with the 65th Engineers at Camp Upton, New York, he attended the Heavy Artillery and Anti-Aircraft Schools at Fort Monroe, Virginia, for several months. In June 1918, he returned to Massachusetts for several months' duty with the Coast Artillery. In October 1918, as a major, Ford was put in command of the 15th Antiaircraft Sector at Camp Upton, Virginia, and helped prepare some of the troops for service overseas.

When the armistice of November 11, 1918 intervened, Ford commanded the coast defenses of San Juan, Puerto Rico, for five months, then spent three months in France assisting with the shipment of war material to the United States. By October 1919, he had returned to the States and to duty with the Proof Department at Aberdeen Proving Ground, where he reverted to his permanent grade of captain. On July 1, 1920, Ford was transferred from the Coast Artillery to Ordnance Corps.

In September 1921, Major Ford was named Professor of Military Science and Tactics at Yale University, a post he filled for more than three years until transferred to Camp Lewis, Washington, as camp Ordnance and Chemical Warfare officer. After eighteen months there, Ford reported to Watertown Arsenal, where he completed Course I at the Ordnance School in June 1927, and Course II in March 1928. He was then enrolled in Ordnance Specialists' School at Raritan Arsenal, and completed the course there in June 1928. In September, he was placed in charge of the Metal Components Section, Ammunition Department, at the Office of the Chief of Ordnance. In 1930, he enrolled at the Army Industrial College and graduated in June 1932.

Major Ford completed the two year Command and General Staff course at Fort Leavenworth, Kansas, in June 1934. During his second summer at Leavenworth, the School was closed, and all students were given temporary assignments with the newly created Civilian Conservation Corps. Ford worked with 250 young men in several national forests in Oregon, opening up trails so that firefighters could more readily gain access to forest fires.

In July 1934, Ford began a three-year tour as assistant commandant of the Ordnance School at Aberdeen Proving Ground, Maryland. The instructional staff at that time numbered but four or five officers, and the student body consisted of about a dozen officers. The Post Commandant also held down the assignment as school commandant. Most instruction was carried on in the second floor (rear) of the present Post Headquarters building. In July 1937, Ford became assistant to the works manager at Springfield Armory, rising to the post of works manager in December 1940. Here he was concerned with development of new weapons, concentrating on the M1 Garand Rifle. The staff at Springfield was very small in the late 1930s, numbering fewer than 200 employees, but this had risen to 11,000 by the time Ford left Springfield for his next assignment. While at Springfield, Ford was twice promoted.

In June 1942, six months after the American entry into World War II, Colonel Ford was assigned to the Ordnance Section, Headquarters Services of Supply, in the European Theater of Operations, with primary concern for maintenance matters. In September of that same year, he became Chief Ordnance Officer at Allied Force Headquarters. Still operating in this capacity, he transferred his operations to North Africa in November 1942. In February 1943, he was designated Chief of Staff at Headquarters, North African Theater of Operations, under General Everett Hughes, later to be his predecessor as Chief of Ordnance.

While in North Africa, he was promoted to brigadier general, and in May 1944, he returned to Washington as chief of the Stock Control Branch, Field Services Division Office, Office of the Chief of Ordnance. The following month, he became Chief of the Reclamation and Maintenance Branch within the Field Services Division. In this office, he had responsibility for rebuilding and reconditioning materiel for use by combat forces overseas. In July 1946, Brigadier General Ford was sent to Europe as Chief of Ordnance to the American forces in the European Theater, and had charge of rebuilding and reconditioning operations, this time in West Germany. Two years later, in June 1948, he returned to Aberdeen Proving Ground as its commanding general, and in August 1949, was promoted to major general as the 18th Chief of Ordnance for the U.S. Army.

During his four-year tour, Ford worked to organize and direct wartime production for the Korean War under peacetime restrictions. A number of plant facilities had to be put back into production capability to manufacture ammunition and other materiel for Korea. Production facilities were also set up in Japan to rebuild weapons and vehicles for use in Korea. Planning and production were complicated by official assumptions that the war would be over within a short period of time. The Army adopted the 280mm atomic cannon in 1952. Other items introduced under Ford's aegis were the 75mm radar controlled Skysweeper anti aircraft gun, the Nike anti aircraft guided missile, and a new series of battle tanks. At the newly created Redstone Arsenal, an array of new rockets and guided missiles were under development. The Ordnance Department also contributed to the nation's space effort through its research, engineering, and scientific developments. Ford retired from the Army on October 30, 1953, and died in Washington, D.C., on February 25, 1990, at age 97.

Military offices
Preceded by Everett S. Hughes	Chief of Ordnance of the United States Army; 1949–1953	Succeeded by Emerson L. Cummings
