= Emerson LeRoy Cummings =

United States Army general (1902–1986)

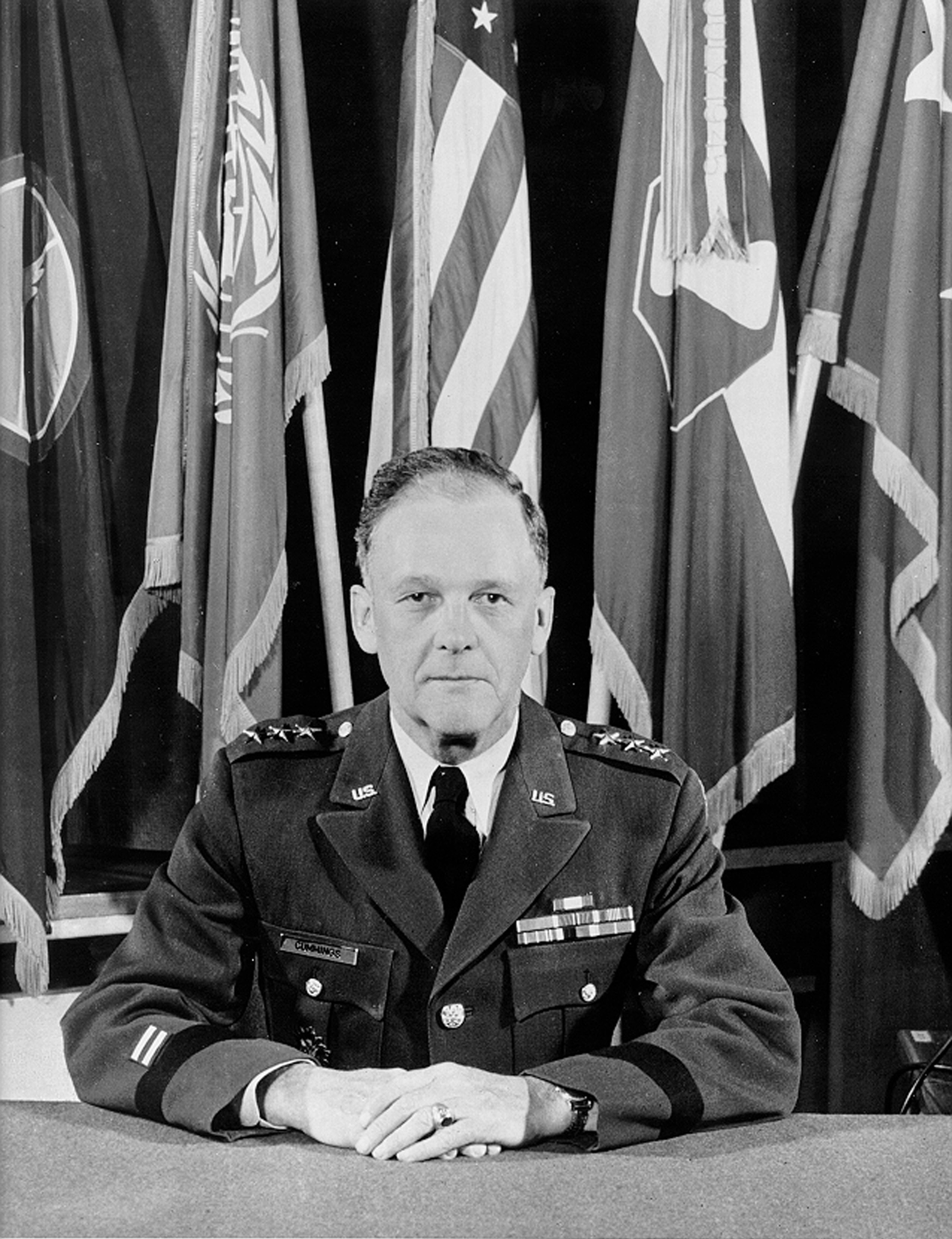
- Born: 16 March 1902; New Boston, Michigan, U.S.
- Died: 24 January 1986 (aged 83); Zephyrhills, Florida, U.S.
- Military career
- Allegiance: United States
- Branch: United States Army
- Service years: 1924–1962
- Rank: Lieutenant General
- Commands: Fifth United States Army; United States Army, Japan; Chief of Ordnance
- Conflicts: World War II
- Awards: Distinguished Service Medal (2); Legion of Merit; Bronze Star Medal

Emerson LeRoy Cummings (16 March 1902 – 24 January 1986) was a United States Army lieutenant general who served as the 19th Chief of Ordnance for the United States Army Ordnance Corps, and commander of the Fifth United States Army.

== Early life ==
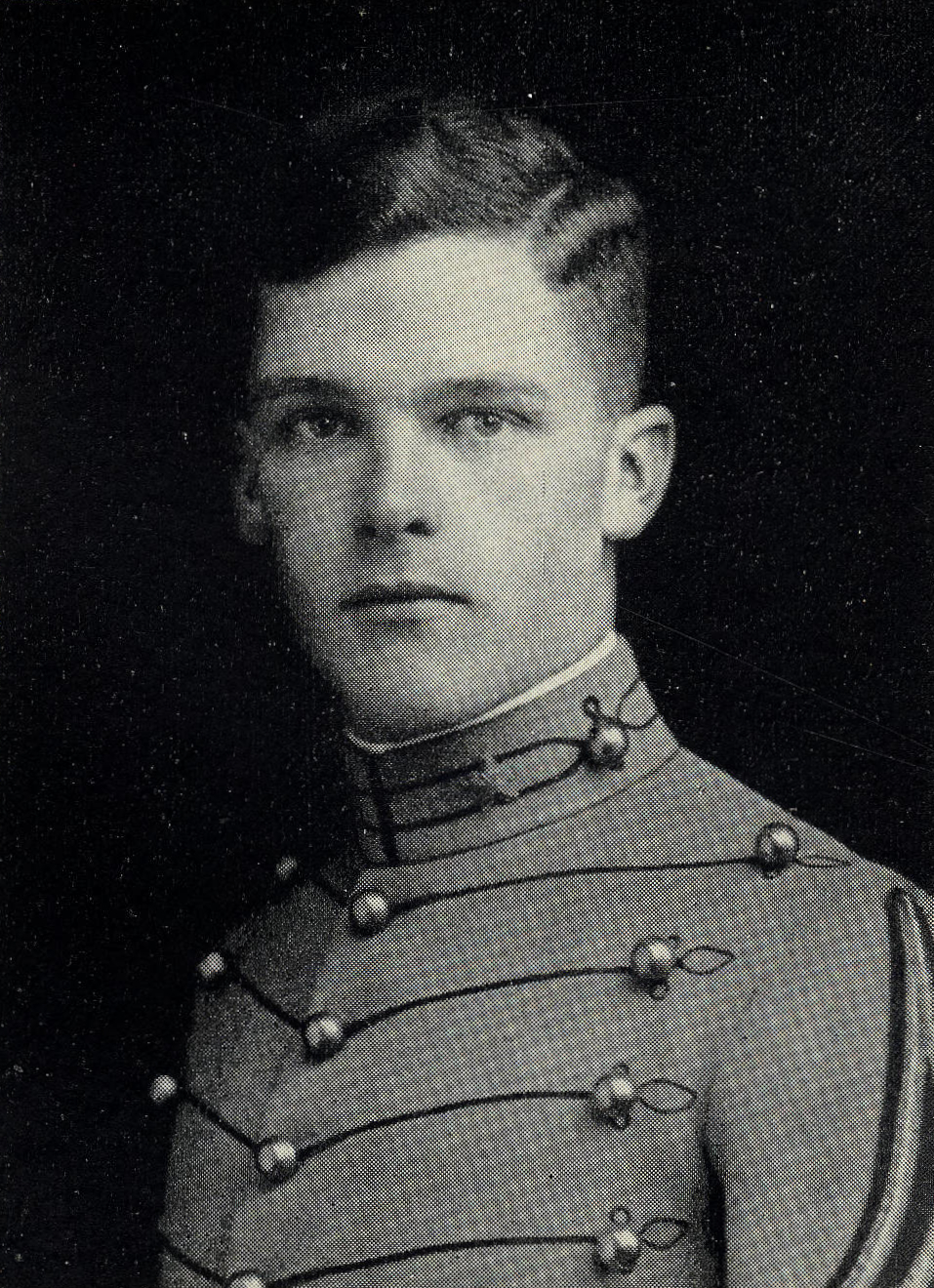
Cummings as a United States Military Academy cadet c. 1924

Cummings was born in New Boston, Michigan on 16 March 1902. He graduated from Eastern High School in Bay City, Michigan. Cummings went on to graduate fourth in his class from the United States Military Academy on 12 June 1924 and was assigned to the Engineer branch.

== Early career ==
In 1926, Cummings completed a program in civil engineering at Cornell University. He graduated from the Engineer Officer Course in 1927.

In the 1920s and early 1930s Cummings served in Engineer assignments throughout the United States, including a staff position with the federal Alaska Road Commission and a posting to Fort Lewis, Washington. Cummings received a Bachelor of Science degree in mechanical engineering from the Massachusetts Institute of Technology in 1933. In 1934, he graduated from the Ordnance Officer Course. Cummings formally transferred to the Ordnance Department on 12 February 1936.

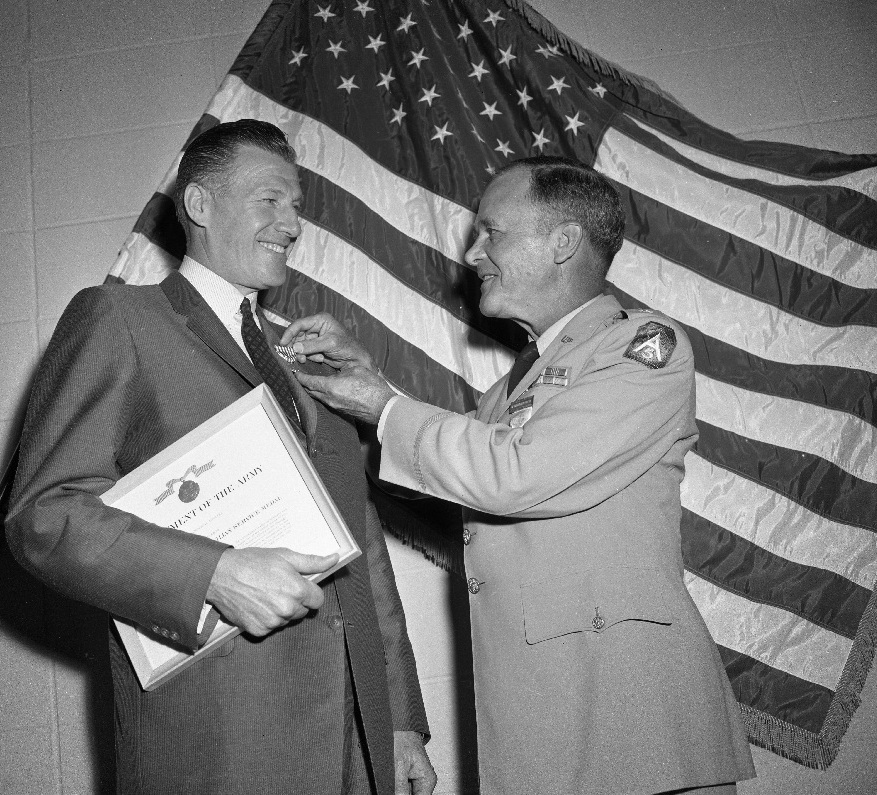
Cummings presents award to Thomas H. Coulter, Chicago Association of Commerce and Industry, 29 July 1961

In 1939, Cummings graduated from the Command and General Staff School and the Chemical Warfare Course. In the early 1940s Cummings served as assistant to the chief of the artillery division in the Ordnance Department's Industrial Service Division.

== World War II ==
During World War II Cummings was head of the army's industrial operations in Detroit, overseeing production of combat vehicles and other materiel. He was then assigned to command of the Ordnance Department's industrial division in Europe.

== Post-war ==
Cummings continued his Ordnance career after World War II. He graduated from the National War College in 1948. In the late 1940s Cummings was chief of the Parts and Supplies Branch in the Ordnance Branch's Engineering Materials Division.

In the early 1950s Cummings served as chief the Ordnance Corps' Industrial Division. While in this assignment Cummings also served as the Army's Assistant Chief of Ordnance.

In November 1953, Cummings was promoted to major general and became the 19th Chief of Ordnance for the Army. He organized the Commodity Command and established the Project Manager System as the exceedingly complex missile systems came into being. During his tenure, the Explorer, the first U.S. satellite, was developed and placed into orbit. He promoted good relations with industry, drawing in part on his World War II experiences with civilian manufacturers, by means of Industry Advisory Groups. The M14 rifle, utilizing 7.62mm cartridge, was developed during his time in office.

After completing his term as Chief of Ordnance, from 1958 to 1960 Cummings was assigned as deputy commander of the Eighth United States Army, simultaneously serving as commander of U.S. Army, Japan.

From 1961 to 1962, Cummings served as commander of the Fifth United States Army in Chicago.

== Retirement and awards ==
Cummings retired in March 1962. His awards included two Army Distinguished Service Medals, the Legion of Merit and the Bronze Star Medal.

In retirement Cummings resided in Largo, Florida. He operated a woodworking shop as a hobby, and also volunteered as a set builder for the Little Theater of Clearwater, remaining active almost until his death.

In 1972, Cummings was inducted into the Ordnance Corps Hall of Fame. He died in Zephyrhills, Florida on January 24, 1986 and was interred at Arlington National Cemetery on 3 February 1986.

Military offices
| Preceded by Elbert L. Ford | Chief of Ordnance of the United States Army; 1953–1958 | Succeeded by John Honeycutt Hinrichs |
