= Zeke Bonura =

American baseball player (1908–1987)

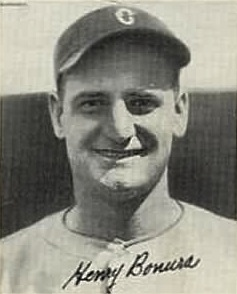
- First baseman
- Born: September 20, 1908; New Orleans, Louisiana, U.S.
- Died: March 9, 1987 (aged 78); New Orleans, Louisiana, U.S.
- Batted: Right Threw: Right

MLB debut
- April 17, 1934, for the Chicago White Sox

Last MLB appearance
- September 26, 1940, for the Chicago Cubs

MLB statistics
- Batting average: .307
- Home runs: 119
- Runs batted in: 704
- Stats at Baseball Reference

Teams
- Chicago White Sox (1934–1937); Washington Senators (1938); New York Giants (1939); Washington Senators (1940); Chicago Cubs (1940)

Henry John "Zeke" Bonura (September 20, 1908 – March 9, 1987) was an American professional baseball first baseman in Major League Baseball. From 1934 through 1940, he played for the Chicago White Sox (1934–1937), Washington Senators (1938, 1940), New York Giants (1939) and Chicago Cubs (1940). Bonura batted and threw right-handed. He was born in New Orleans.

In a seven-season career, Bonura posted a .307 batting average (1099-for-3582) with 119 home runs and 704 RBI in 917 games played. Defensively, he was a good first baseman, recording a career .992 fielding percentage.

== Amateur athletics ==
One of Bonura's more noteworthy athletic accomplishments has nothing to do with the sport of baseball. In June 1925, at the age of sixteen, Bonura became the youngest male athlete ever to win an event at the 1925 National Track and Field Championships. He threw the javelin 65.18 meters (213-10) to claim the title. Bonura's winning effort was a meet record by nearly twenty-feet; a prodigious mark that remained on the books until 1930.

Bonura did not play baseball at Loyola New Orleans because the university did not field a team. Instead he lettered in basketball, football, and track and field.

== Baseball career ==
Bonura made his debut in professional baseball at the age of 25 in 1934 by making the Opening Day roster of the Chicago White Sox. He went 0-for-3 in his debut against Detroit. He batted .302 in 127 games with a career-high 27 home runs having 64 walks to 31 strikeouts with 110 runs batted in while leading in fielding percentage for a first baseman in the American League. No Sox player would hit more HR in a season until Gus Zernial passed him in 1950. The following year, he played in 138 games and batted .295 while having 162 hits and 92 RBIs on the way to receiving a 15th place finish for MVP. The next year, he batted .330 in 148 games with a career-high 138 RBIs and a 19th place MVP finish with another top performance in fielding percentage. His RBI total was the most for a White Sox player until Albert Belle broke it in 1998. In his final season with the Sox in 1937, he had a .345 average in 116 games (fourth best in the American League behind Charlie Gehringer, Lou Gehrig, and Joe DiMaggio) to go with 100 RBIs and a career-high 41 doubles.

On March 18, 1938, he was traded to the Washington Senators for eight-year veteran Joe Kuhel. His 1938 season proved to have plenty of highlights. He hit just .289 for Washington, but he had 114 RBIs in 137 games, with five of those games seeing him have four hits each. He was the last player to have five 4-hit games in a calendar month until Julio Rodriguez did so in August 2023. Bonura led the league in fielding percentage as the position for the third and final time. On December 11, 1938, he was traded to the New York Giants for Tom Baker, Jim Carlin and $20,000.

In his only season with the Giants, he batted .321 in 123 games while having 85 RBIs. Manager Bill Terry had benched Bonura late in the season in favor of Babe Young and Bonura did not take kindly to the benching, as Bonura led the team in batting average that season. His rights were purchased by Washington for $20,000 in April 1940, who in turn sold him to the Cubs for $10,000 in July. In what became his final pro season, he batted .270 in 128 total games. The following year, his contract was sold to the Minneapolis Millers of the American Association.

== Post-playing career ==
in 1941, Bonura joined the US Army and was stationed at Camp Shelby, Mississippi. With the outbreak of World War II, he was recalled to active duty, and returned to Camp Shelby where he was in charge of organizing baseball. In mid 1943, he was posted to Oran, Algeria. He organized large-scale baseball operations, consisting of 150 teams in 6 leagues. Playoffs among the teams narrowed them to two finalists – the Casablanca Yankees, consisting of medics, and the Algiers Streetwalkers, consisting of MPs. The North African World Series was a best two-out-of-three-game championship played on October 3 and 4, 1943, at Eugene Stadium in Algiers, between the two teams. The Casablanca Yankees won the series in two straight games. The winners were presented with baseballs autographed by General Eisenhower, and the winning team received a trophy made from an unexploded Italian bomb.

In mid 1945, Bonura was discharged from the army with the rank of master sergeant. He received the Legion of Merit medal while serving in the US Army during World War II, for his work as athletic director for the Army in Algeria in 1943 in 1944.

By the time the Army released him in October 1945, he was in his mid-thirties and no team wanted him. He served as a minor league player/manager from 1946 to 1952 before focusing on his managing from 1952 to 1954. He won the Northern League championship in 1953 with the Fargo-Moorhead Twins. After managing, he worked real estate in New Orleans, Louisiana.

In seven seasons as a player, he had 180 strikeouts and 404 walks while never having more strikeouts than walks in a season. He had 704 RBIs in 917 games, having four 100-RBI seasons in his first five years. He had 119 home runs and 1,099 hits and left baseball with a career .307 average. He was inducted into the Italian American Sports Hall of Fame, the Louisiana Sports Hall of Fame, and the Texas League Hall of Fame.

== See also ==
- List of athletes on Wheaties boxes
