= John Honeycutt Hinrichs =

United States Army general (1904–1990)

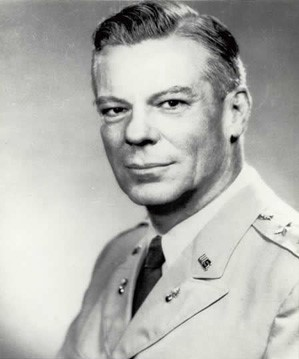
- Hinrichs as Chief of Ordnance, 1958
- Born: 10 July 1904; Sandy Hook, New Jersey, U.S.
- Died: 13 February 1990 (aged 85); Monterey, California, U.S.
- Military career
- Allegiance: United States
- Branch: United States Army
- Service years: 1928–1962
- Rank: Lieutenant General
- Commands: Chief of Ordnance
- Conflicts: World War II
- Awards: Army Distinguished Service Medal; Legion of Merit; Bronze Star Medal

John H. Hinrichs (10 July 1904 – 13 February 1990) was a United States Army lieutenant general who served as the 20th Chief of Ordnance for the United States Army Ordnance Corps.

== Early life ==
Hinrichs as a United States Military Academy cadet c. 1928

John Honeycutt Hinrichs was born at Sandy Hook Proving Ground in Sandy Hook, New Jersey on 10 July 1904, to Frederic William Hinrichs Jr and Mary Honeycutt-Hinrichs. He was raised in California. His father and grandfather, John Thomas Honeycutt, were both graduates of the United States Military Academy, West Point, New York. His brother, Lieutenant Frederic W. Hinrichs, III, was a pilot in the United States Navy Reserve and died in an airplane crash during World War II.

In 1928 Hinrichs graduated from the United States Military Academy.

== Early career ==
Hinrichs was initially assigned to the Field Artillery branch. In 1932 he received a Bachelor of Science degree in mechanical engineering from the Massachusetts Institute of Technology. In 1935 he transferred from Artillery to the Ordnance Corps and, in 1937, graduated from the Army Industrial College. Hinrichs served in numerous Ordnance assignments in the United States and overseas, including a posting to Frankford Arsenal and command of the Twin Cities Ordnance Plant.

== World War II ==
From 1943 to 1945 Hinrichs was executive officer (second in command) of the Maintenance Division in the Ordnance Department's Field Service Office. In this position he was responsible for improving equipment and weapons readiness by analyzing data to identify systemic causes for breakdowns and repairs, and developing solutions to minimize the time these items were non-mission capable.

== Later career ==
In the late 1940s Hinrichs served as Ordnance Officer for United States Army Forces, Middle Pacific. In 1948 he graduated from the National War College.

From the early to mid-1950s Hinrichs was head of the Field Service Division. He was Deputy Chief of Ordnance from 1955 to 1958. From 1958 until his retirement in 1962, Hinrichs was the Army's Chief of Ordnance. He was promoted to lieutenant general in 1959.

== Awards and decorations ==
Hinrichs' decorations included the Army Distinguished Service Medal for service from September 1955 to May 1962, Legion of Merit for service from 1943 to 1945 and the Bronze Star Medal.

In 1978, Hinrichs was inducted in the Ordnance Corps Association's Hall of Fame.

== Retirement and death ==
In 1962, Hinrichs had been announced as the first head of a new Supply and Maintenance Command. In April, 1962 he gave Congressional testimony defending Nike Zeus Missile contractors against charges of excessive profiteering on previous projects. As a result of the controversy over whether the contractors were being overpaid, and because he opposed the reorganization, Hinrichs opted to retire.

Hinrichs died in Carmel, California on 13 February 1990.

Military offices
Preceded by Emerson LeRoy Cummings	Chief of Ordnance of the United States Army; 1958–1962	Succeeded by Horace F. Bigelow
