= Everett Hughes (United States Army officer) =

United States Army general

Everett Strait Hughes
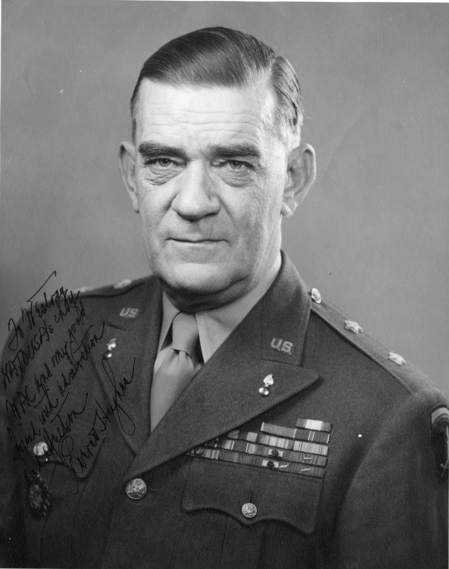
- Born: October 21, 1885; Ipswich, Dakota Territory
- Died: September 5, 1957 (aged 71); Washington, D.C., US
- Military career
- Allegiance: United States
- Branch: United States Army
- Service years: 1908–1949
- Rank: Major general
- Commands: 17th Chief of Ordnance (1946-1949)
- Conflicts: Mexican Revolution: Battle of San Miguelito; World War I: World War II: Algeria-French Morocco Campaign; Tunisia Campaign; Sicily Campaign; Lorraine Campaign; Ardennes Campaign; Rhineland Campaign; Central Europe Campaign
- Awards: Distinguished Service Medal; Legion of Merit (2); Bronze Star Medal; Legion of Honor (France); Croix de Guerre (France); Order of the Crown (Belgium); Croix de Guerre (Belgium); Order of the Patriotic War First Class (USSR); Order of Nichan-Iftikhar (Tunisia)

Everett Strait Hughes (October 21, 1885 – September 5, 1957) was a major general in the United States Army who served as the 17th Chief of Ordnance for the U.S. Army Ordnance Corps. He is known for his close association with Dwight D. Eisenhower. Hughes was born in Ipswich, Dakota Territory, was a West Point graduate, and rose to become major general in the U.S. Army. He fought in a number of battles including the Mexican border war and World War I. During World War II he was one of George S. Patton's close friends and Eisenhower's "right-hand man" during the entire European campaign.

== Career ==
Everett Hughes, while born in what is now South Dakota, was raised in Minnesota and appointed to the United States Military Academy, West Point, New York, from that state. He is noted for being the first captain of the West Point lacrosse team. Hughes graduated 13th in his class from West Point with a B.S. in 1908, was commissioned as a second lieutenant in the 3rd Field Artillery on February 14, 1908. He was stationed at Fort Sam Houston, Texas, where he became a first lieutenant in the 6th Field Artillery on March 11, 1911.

In 1912 he graduated from the Ordnance School of Technology at the Watertown Arsenal, Massachusetts, and was seconded to the Ordnance Department. He was posted to Manila Ordnance Depot in the Philippines, where he was promoted to captain on June 20, 1913. His secondment to the Ordnance Department ended on June 20, 1915, and he was assigned to the 4th Field Artillery at Fort Bliss, Texas.

Hughes and George S. Patton, Jr., became good friends while serving under John J. Pershing in the punitive expedition to Mexico. After the United States entry into World War I, Hughes was posted to the Office of the Chief of Ordnance in Washington, D.C., where he was involved in purchasing artillery. He was promoted to major on June 25, 1917, lieutenant colonel on January 10, 1918, and colonel on October 19, 1918. He arrived in France on October 23, 1918, serving there until March 16, 1919, when he returned to duty at the Office of the Chief of Ordnance.

With the end of the war, Hughes reverted to his substantive rank of captain on June 30, 1920, but was promoted to major again the next day. He was Ordnance Officer of the VI Corps Area at Fort Sheridan, Illinois, where he transferred to the Ordnance Department on August 21, 1920. He attended the School of the Line at Fort Leavenworth, Kansas, and then the General Staff School there, becoming an instructor on graduation in June 1923. In August 1928, he entered the Army War College.

On graduation from the War College, it was normal for officers to serve on a staff posting, so he returned to Washington, D.C., for duty with the G-1 Branch of the War Department General Staff. He was promoted to lieutenant colonel again on November 13, 1931. On August 17, 1932, he was posted to the Aberdeen Proving Ground, where he remained until August 26, 1935, when he was transferred to the Picatinny Arsenal. He was promoted to colonel again on October 1, 1936. On May 20, 1939, he returned to duty in the Office of the Chief of Ordnance, where he was serving when the United States entered World War II.

On May 19, 1942, Hughes became Chief of Ordnance of the European Theater of Operations United States Army (ETOUSA). He became Chief of Staff of the Services of Supply on July 29, with the rank of brigadier general from September 6, 1942. On January 26, 1943, he became Deputy Chief Of Staff of the European Theater of Operations, and then on February 15, 1943, he was appointed Deputy Theater Commander of the North African Theater of Operations, and commander of the Communications Zone. He was promoted to major general on March 18, 1943. He threw out the first ball in the North African World Series on October 3, 3, 1943.

When the Allied forces suffered heavy casualties at the hands of the German general Erwin Rommel in the Battle of the Kasserine Pass, Hughes recommended Patton to Eisenhower for command in Africa. Patton went on to win victories over the German forces. Eisenhower considered Hughes one of his closest friends and confidants and Hughes' reports on the incredible shortcomings of the supply situation in North Africa, sent shock waves through Allied command. His reports upset Eisenhower's Chief of Staff, Major General Walter Bedell Smith. Smith and Hughes had been "engaged in a power struggle" since the planning of Operation Torch and their relationship was tense, Smith accused Hughes of "empire building", and the two clashed over trivial issues. For his services in the Mediterranean, Hughes was awarded the Bronze Star Medal and the Army Distinguished Service Medal.

Everett Hughes was instrumental during Algeria-French Morocco Campaign, and Eisenhower had him transferred to London for the upcoming Normandy Invasion on February 21, 1944, after Hughes was declared surplus in North Africa. Eisenhower wrote to his wife, Mamie, "I do miss Everett, wish I still had him." Hughes endeared himself to Eisenhower for his gift of procuring hard-to-find items such as Eisenhower's favorite whiskey, Director's Reserve. Hughes' official role during the invasion of Europe was to be what Eisenhower termed his "eyes and ears." He toured behind lines, reported on security issues and logistical problems, and advised Eisenhower on discipline issues. He was later appointed Inspector General of U.S. Forces in the European Theater before being called back to Washington, D.C., in February 1946, as Acting Chief of Ordnance.

Hughes was named as the 17th Chief of Ordnance in June 1946. During his tenure, the normal peacetime activities, including research, development, storage, maintenance, and training, continued at higher levels than had existed prior to World War II. He improved the efficiency of the office through organizational improvements. The facilities at the Ballistic Research Laboratory at Aberdeen Proving Ground were expanded, the Terminal Ballistics Laboratory was completed in 1949, and White Sands Proving Ground in New Mexico became an important installation for rocket and missile testing. Studies were made on the wartime German V-2 missile, and in July 1949, Redstone Arsenal in Alabama was given the mission of conducting research, development, and testing of rockets, missiles, propellants, and related items. Construction of the ENIAC computer was completed in 1946 and became operational at Aberdeen Proving Ground in 1947. The seven manufacturing arsenals continued to play a major role in the development of the new designs in ordnance materiel and in the improvement of existing equipment.

Hughes retired from the military in 1949 and settled in Washington, D.C.. He was appointed as the Director for Office of Energy and Utilities of the National Security Resources Board.

== Decorations ==
He was twice awarded the Legion of Merit and also the Army Distinguished Service Medal. For his services in World War II, he received a number of foreign awards, including the Legion of Honor and the Croix de Guerre from France, the Order of the Crown and Croix de Guerre from Belgium, the Order of the Patriotic War First Class from the Soviet Union and the Order of Nichan-Iftikhar from Tunisia. Here is his ribbon bar:

1st Row	Army Distinguished Service Medal		Legion of Merit with Oak Leaf Cluster	Bronze Star Medal	
2nd Row	Mexican Service Medal	World War I Victory Medal		American Defense Service Medal	American Campaign Medal
3rd Row	European-African-Middle Eastern Campaign Medal with eight service stars	World War II Victory Medal		Commander of the Legion of Honor (France)	French Croix de guerre 1939–1945 with Palm
4th Row	Commander of the Order of the Crown (Belgium)	Belgian Croix de guerre 1940–1945 with Palm		Commander of the Order of Nichan-Iftikhar (Tunisia)	Order of the Patriotic War First Class (USSR)

== Death and burial ==
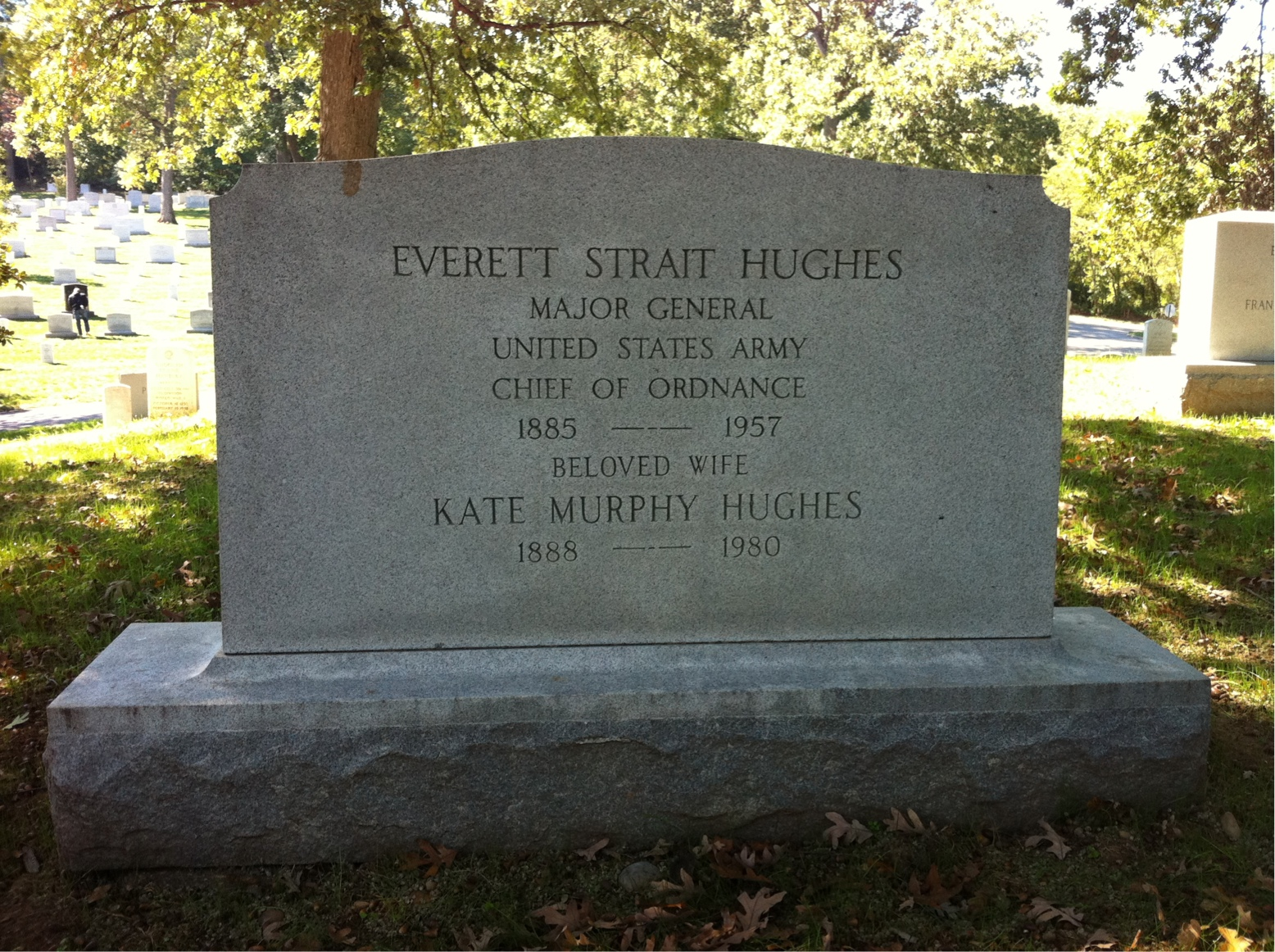
Grave at Arlington National Cemetery

Hughes died on September 5, 1957, at Walter Reed Army Medical Center after a long illness. He was interred at Arlington National Cemetery with full military honors on September 10, 1957.

== Hughes diary and transcription ==
Hughes was a prolific note-taker, correspondent, and diarist; his papers at the Library of Congress measure 5.2 linear feet. His diaries sat for many years in the Library of Congress and were not studied due to Hughes' unique "spiky Gothic hand." Molly McClellan was able to "crack" Hughes' code and transcribe the over 900 pages of his diaries, thus allowing researchers to read his account of activities during World War II, notably those of Eisenhower's inner circle.

== Personal life ==
Hughes married Kate Murphy of San Antonio (d. 1980) in 1910. In 1981 Holocaust denier David Irving claimed that Hughes had a girlfriend whom he referred to as “JP” in his diary. Recent research has discovered that “JP” refers to Elizabeth Prismall, who was a British secretary on Hughes’ staff. The nature of their relationship was indeed close, but it is by no means certain that the two were having an affair. In a letter dated March 8, 1943, Hughes himself wrote to his wife seeking to dissipate in advance any rumors that might reach her ears: "I have taken Mrs. Prismall to the mess several times and during the past few days ... So you’ll soon here [sic] that Hughes has a girl friend [sic] along with the rest. But don’t put the wrong interpretation on anything you hear or on what I have said unless you want to make yourself unhappy.”

== Notes ==
Military offices
Preceded by Lieutenant General Levin H. Campbell, Jr.	Chief of Ordnance of the United States Army; 1946 - 1949	Succeeded by Major General Elbert L. Ford
