= Walt Singer =

American football player (1911–1992)

- Born: Walter Wallace Singer; December 6, 1911; Jersey City, New Jersey, US
- Died: February 5, 1992 (aged 80)
- Education: Syracuse University
- Occupations: College football player Professional football player
- Known for: Sub-novice Intercollegiate boxing heavyweight champion Hit pivotal home run in the North African World Series
- Height: 6 ft 0 in (183 cm)
- Relatives: identical twin brother, Milton
- Awards: The Star Ledger All-New Jersey 1930's honorable mention (high school); Hudson County Sports Hall of Fame

Walter Wallace Singer (December 6, 1911 – February 5, 1992) was an American college football player at Syracuse University, and a professional football player in the National Football League for the New York Giants. He was also a sub-novice Intercollegiate boxing heavyweight champion, and hit a pivotal home run in the 1943 North African World Series to lead the Casablanca Yankees to victory over the Algiers Street Walkers.

== Early years ==
Singer was born in Jersey City, New Jersey, on December 6, 1911, and was Jewish. He had an identical twin brother, Milton.

Singer attended William L. Dickinson High School in Jersey City. In 1930 he (as an end, and achieving First-Team All-State football honors) and his brother (at running back, and achieving honorable mention for All-State football player honors) led the Dickinson football team to a 9–0 record as it became the second-ever Hudson County Interscholastic Athletic Association champion. He also played baseball for the high school team, as a catcher, alongside his brother, who was an All-State first baseman.

== College ==
Singer attended Syracuse University, where he was a member of the Sigma Alpha Mu fraternity. He played end for the Syracuse Orangemen football team for three seasons, from 1932 to 1934, alongside his brother, who was the team's starting center. In 1933 Singer received the AP All-East honorable mention. In 1934 he was named First Team by the Jewish Telegraphic Agency, at left end. His brother Milton, at center, was also named First Team.

He and his brother also played baseball for Syracuse in 1933. Additionally, he boxed, winning the sub-novice Intercollegiate boxing heavyweight championship in 1933. He quit that sport on the insistence of his football coach.

== NFL ==
Singer played offensive end and defensive end for the New York Giants in the NFL in 1935 – the year that the Giants won the NFL East – and in 1936. He then went to the Jersey City Giants football team as player-coach, until he was drafted during World War II. In 1936 he also served as the athletic director of the Jersey City Community Center.

== World War II ==
As a private in the US Army, Singer tried out at Fort Dix, New Jersey, for the 44th Infantry Division baseball team in April 1941. In April 1943, he was a lieutenant stationed in Africa. He played in the North African World Series, a best two-out-of-three-game baseball championship played on October 3 and 4, 1943 in Algiers, Algeria, between the Casablanca Yankees and the Algiers Streetwalkers, drawn from the ranks of American soldiers and sailors stationed in North Africa during World War II. Singer, the only officer in the games, was the manager and first baseman for Casablanca. He hit a pivotal home run in the second game of the series – the only home run in the games – to carry the Casablanca Yankees to victory over the Algiers Street Walkers. Singer ultimately reached the rank of major.

== Death and legacy ==
Singer died on February 5, 1992, at the age of 80.

In 1999, Singer received The Star Ledger's All-New Jersey 1930's honorable mention (high school). In 2000, he was inducted into the Hudson County Sports Hall of Fame.
