= William H. Tschappat =

United States Army general

William Harvey Tschappat
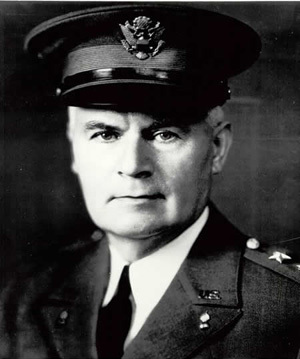
- Major General William H. Tschappat
- Military career
- Allegiance: United States of America
- Branch: United States Army
- Service years: 1896–1938
- Rank: Major General
- Commands: 14th Chief of Ordnance (1934 - 1938)

Major General William H. Tschappat (1874–1955) was a career officer in the United States Army and served as the 14th Chief of Ordnance for the U.S. Army Ordnance Corps.

== Early life ==
William H. Tschappat was born in Cameron, Ohio, on August 10, 1874, the tenth of eleven children. His father moved his family to Beallsville, Ohio, where William completed his schooling. He briefly taught school in nearby Jerusalem, Ohio, while continuing his work on the family farm. Tschappat graduated fifth in his class from United States Military Academy at West Point, New York in 1896.

== Military career ==
Tschappat became an artillery officer and spent several years in routine assignments at Fort Slocum, Fort Hancock, and Fort Hamilton. In 1898, he became a first lieutenant in the Ordnance Department and had an assignment at Watertown Arsenal, followed by an assignment in the Office of the Chief of Ordnance in Washington, D.C.

Next, he spent five years at Sandy Hook Proving Ground, followed by inspection duties at the Bethlehem Steel plant in South Bethlehem, Pennsylvania. From September 1906 to May 1907, he served as chief ordnance officer of the Army of Cuban Pacification and depot ordnance officer in Havana. In 1907, he was assigned to Picatinny Arsenal, where he was promoted to major in September of that year. At Picatinny Arsenal, he conducted a number of the scientific investigations in powder design and its effect upon projectiles for which he was widely recognized.

In 1912, Tschappat was assigned to West Point as professor of ordnance and the science of gunnery and was promoted to lieutenant colonel during his tenure. During this time, he wrote his textbook, Ordnance and Gunnery, published in 1917 with several follow-on editions. This textbook was used by Cadets for a generation. One significant feature of the book was its discussion of a new method of solving the essential problems of interior ballistics. Following his teaching assignment, he was assigned administrative duties at the Office of Chief of Ordnance as a temporary colonel in July 1918. He remained in Washington for four years. In July 1922, he became commanding officer of Aberdeen Proving Ground, Maryland. Upon completion of this command tour in May 1925, he returned to the Office of the Chief of Ordnance as chief of the technical staff. Tschappat continued in this post for four years. In May 1929, he went to the Philippines as Department Ordnance Officer and Commanding Officer of the Philippine Ordnance Depot from October 1929 until June 1930. On June 10, he was promoted to brigadier general and returned to Washington, D.C., as assistant chief of ordnance and the chief of manufacturing service.

On June 3, 1934, Tschappat was promoted to major general and became the 14th chief of ordnance. During his tenure, he was primarily concerned with the scientific aspects of ordnance. His insistence upon the importance of this field laid the groundwork for much of the research and development program which culminated in the creation of the Research Division at Aberdeen Proving Ground in 1935, which expanded into the Ballistic Research Laboratory in 1938. In addition, in 1936, the M1 Garand Semiautomatic Rifle was adopted and became the standard weapon of American infantrymen in World War II.

On August 31, 1938, Tschappat was retired from active duty on account of physical disability. That same year, he was elected an honorary member of the American Society of Mechanical Engineers. From 1942 to 1945, he served as a member of the National Inventors Council. He died on September 22, 1955, at Walter Reed Army Hospital in Washington at the age of 81.

Military offices
Preceded by Major General Samuel Hof	Chief of Ordnance of the United States Army; 1934 - 1938	Succeeded by Major General Charles M. Wesson
