= Eulalio Tordil shootings =

2016 spree shooting in Maryland, U.S.

- Date: May 5 and 6, 2016 (Eastern)
- Attack type: Shooting
- Weapon: Glock 27 (.40 S&W)
- Deaths: 3
- Injuries: 3
- Perpetrator: Eulalio Sevilla Tordil
- Charges: 3 counts of first degree murder; 2 counts of attempted first degree murder; 4 counts of use of a handgun in the commission of a felony

On May 5 and 6, 2016, a shooting spree occurred across several locations in Maryland. Eulalio Tordil, a Homeland Security officer, traveled across the Washington metropolitan area, where he shot and killed three people and wounded three others in the span of 24 hours between May 5 and 6, 2016. The shooting was reminiscent of the 2002 Washington, D.C., sniper attacks.

== Incidents ==
On May 5, 2016, Eulalio Tordil drove to High Point High School in Beltsville, Maryland where his estranged wife Gladys was picking up her daughters. Tordil confronted her and injured a male (John Lancaster) who tried to intervene, before fatally shooting her a total of six times in her SUV. Gladys's daughter was exiting the school and also attempted to aid her mother, who shouted at her and urged her to run away. Her daughter ran back into the school and called 911, identifying her stepfather as the shooter.

Tordil then drove off, and the Prince George's County police released a photo and description of his vehicle. On May 6, Tordil drove to a Macy's store in the Westfield Montgomery Mall and opened fire, killing one man and injuring two others while attempting to car-jack a vehicle to evade police detection. Tordil soon fled to a nearby Giant Supermarket in Aspen Hill, where he shot and killed a woman sitting in her car while he attempted to steal it. The victim of this third attack, Claudina Molina, fought back against Tordil, knocking off his glasses. During the incidents, all Montgomery County Public Schools were ordered to shelter in place. The main campus of the National Institutes of Health was also on high alert, and the Montgomery College campuses were locked down. Local recreation centers, park facilities, and library branches in Montgomery County were closed.

After the third shooting, Tordil visited a nearby Dunkin' Donuts and Boston Market for coffee and lunch. It was the same Boston Market where John Allen Muhammad and Lee Boyd Malvo ate lunch during their spree. Tordil was arrested before 3:00 pm in Aspen Hill, and charged with the first-degree murder of Gladys Tordil, two counts of first-degree murder, two counts of attempted first-degree murder, and four counts of use of a handgun in the commission of a felony in connection with the Montgomery County shootings. He intended to die after the shootings via suicide by cop, but was overwhelmed by over 100 police officers. Besides his estranged wife, all of his other targets were complete strangers to him.

== Victims ==
=== Deceased ===
A total of three people were killed in the three attacks. Gladys Tordil was shot and killed on May 5. Malcom Winffel was shot and killed outside the Westfield Montgomery on May 6, and Claudina Molina was killed the same day.

=== Injured ===
Three people were injured in the attacks. Carl Unger was injured after being shot four times, John Lancaster was injured after being shot at several times, one hitting him in the shoulder after he tried to assist Gladys Tordil at High Point High School. The car-jacking victim was shot in the shoulder, in the Westfield Montgomery Mall attack.

== Perpetrator ==
Eulalio Sevilla Tordil (born June 30, 1953) was 62 years old at the time of the incidents. His estranged wife Gladys Tordil had filled a protective order against him in March 2016, alleging 10 years of violence by Tordil against her and her children. Per the order, Tordil verbally, sexually, and physically abused his family and showed the two children pornographic images and subjected them to "intense-military-like discipline", and would put them in "detention" by locking them in dark closets. The order also detailed the weapons that Tordil owned, which included a .40-caliber handgun, a .45-caliber handgun, an M4, a revolver, and a "hunting gun."

After the protective order was issued, Tordil was placed on administrative duties and later placed on administrative leave from his job as a law enforcement officer with the Federal Protective Service through the Department of Homeland Security. After he was placed on administrative leave, Tordil was required to surrender his government-issued weapons, badge and credentials.

=== Legal ===
His public defender detailed to the court that Tordil was a Catholic school choir boy, a former member of the military, and still devoted to his children as he had carried a photo of them in the bag he carried while running from police. Due to the multiple locations of the shootings, Tordil was charged in different court systems.

During his initial Rockville Court Appearance in April 2017, Tordil waived his right to trial by pleading guilty to two charges of first degree murder and two counts of attempted first degree murder. At the time, he faced a life sentence plus three additional life sentences. In July 2018, he was sentenced to life in prison without the possibility of parole, for four consecutive life sentences in relation to the attacks.

The charges relating to the murder of his estranged wife and the wounding of John Lancaster were based through the Prince George's County court system. In September 2017, he was sentenced to two life sentences for the charges to which he had pled guilty. The presiding judge stated: "You should not see or breathe a free bit of air for the rest of your life. It's overwhelming the reasons to show no mercy."

As of November 2025, Tordil is incarcerated in the Western Correctional Institution, in Cumberland, Maryland.

== Aftermath ==
A memorial service was held for Gladys Tordil at Parkdale High School in Riverdale, Maryland on May 16, where she was an AP Chemistry teacher. A local prosecutor pledged to help the daughters of Gladys Tordil, who were 16 and 17; their closest relative was in the Philippines at the time of the murder, causing them to be placed in foster care. The prosecutor is also working to bring an aunt from the Philippines to the United States. A GoFundMe was created to help Winfell's family cover funeral costs and living expenses.
