= D.C. Sniper =

- Official DVD cover
- Directed by: Ulli Lommel
- Written by: Ulli Lommel
- Produced by: Nola Roeper; Ulli Lommel
- Starring: Ken Foree; Christopher Kriesa; Maria Ochoa
- Cinematography: Bianco Pacelli
- Edited by: Christian Behm
- Music by: Robert J. Walsh
- Production companies: Hollywood Action House; Hollywood House of Horror
- Distributed by: Barnholtz Entertainment Inc. North American Motion Pictures
- Release date: March 16, 2010
- Running time: 92 minutes
- Country: United States
- Language: English

D.C. Sniper is a 2010 American direct-to-video drama-thriller film directed by Ulli Lommel and written by Lommel and Ken Foree. It stars Foree, Christopher Kriesa and Maria Ochoa.

== Plot ==
The film tells over the Beltway sniper attacks, the crimes of John Allen Muhammad and Lee Malvo.

== Cast ==
- Lyn Beausoleil as Victim #10
- Bob Beetly as Victim #9
- Christian Behm as Victim #2
- Ken Foree as John Allen Muhammad
- Breana Kennedy as Victim #1
- Christopher Kriesa as Agent James Rogan
- Howard M. Lockie as Darren Gottleab
- Ulli Lommel as Det. Miles Callahan
- Krista McRoberts as Victim #4
- Maria Ochoa as Victim #8
- Alex Ortega as Victim #7
- Nola Roeper as Michelle Lansing
- Jed Rowen as Mike
- Katie Sordahl as Judy Kellerman
- Scott Struna as Victim #3
- Tory N. Thompson as Lee Malvo
- Oscar Vega as Victim #5
- Tamara Whatley as Kelly McGraw
- Elliot Wright as Victim #6

== Reception ==
The film was released as direct-to-video project on March 16, 2010.

== See also ==
- D.C. Sniper: 23 Days of Fear, a TV movie about the same subject
