= Charles Moose =

American police officer and writer (1953–2021)

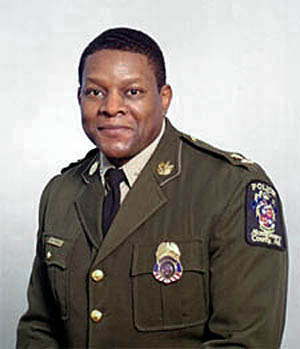
- Moose during his tenure as the chief of the Montgomery County Department of Police.
- Born: Charles Alexander Moose; August 4, 1953; New York City, U.S.
- Died: November 25, 2021 (aged 68); Palm Harbor, Florida, U.S.
- Education: University of North Carolina at Chapel Hill (BA); Portland State University (MPA, PhD)
- Spouse: Sandra "Sandy" Herman-Moose
- Police career
- Country: United States
- Allegiance: United States Air Force
- Department: Montgomery County Police
- Service years: PPB: 1975–1999; MCP: 1999–2003; USAF: 2000–2005; HPD: 2006–2008
- Rank: Chief of Police (1993–2003)
- Other work: Honolulu Police Department; Portland Police Bureau

Charles Alexander Moose (August 4, 1953 – November 25, 2021) was an American author and police officer. He was the primary official in charge of efforts to apprehend the D.C. snipers in October 2002. During his law enforcement career, Moose served as the chief of police for Montgomery County, Maryland, and Portland, Oregon.

== Early life and education ==
Moose was born in New York City on August 4, 1953. His family moved to Lexington, North Carolina, shortly after he was born, and Moose lived and attended school there until leaving for college. When he was sixteen years old, his mother died, and his father died when Moose was in his early twenties. Moose completed his Bachelor of Arts degree in U.S. History in 1975 at the University of North Carolina at Chapel Hill. That year he joined the Portland Police Bureau in Portland, Oregon, as a patrolman. He then earned a Master of Public Administration degree from Portland State University in 1984, and a PhD in urban studies and criminology in 1993.

== Career ==
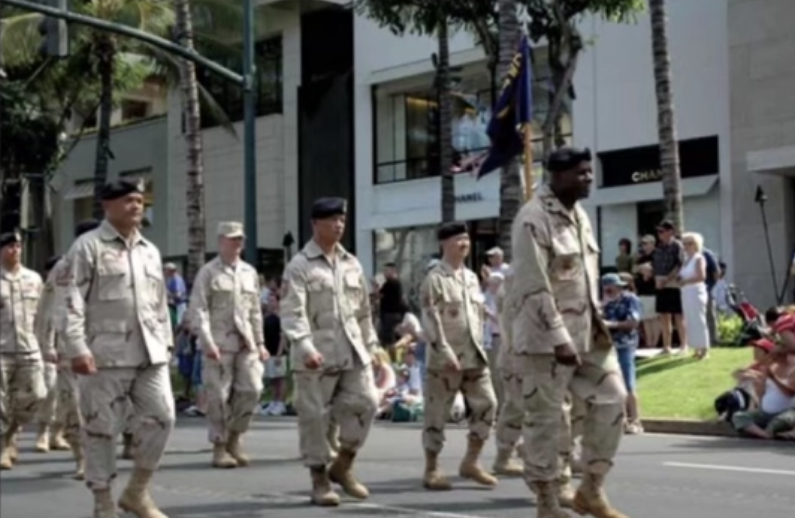
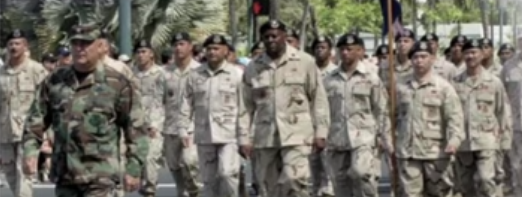
Moose leading airmen in a Hawaiian parade as a squadron commander

=== Police executive ===
In 1993, Moose became the police chief of the Portland Police Bureau and served as the top law enforcement official for the city until 1999. During his time in Portland he also taught at Portland State University and was a member of the Oregon Air National Guard. He had previously applied for a chief's position with the police force in Jackson, Mississippi, but was rejected when they discovered his wife was white. On August 2, 1999, he became the 15th Chief of the Montgomery County Police Department in Maryland, being hired by County Executive Doug Duncan. In October 2002, he was the primary official in charge of the efforts to apprehend those responsible for the D.C. sniper attacks. In June 2003, Moose resigned after a disagreement with Montgomery County regarding a policy that barred him from working on a book and consulting on a movie about the sniper investigation. The book was released in September 2003 and is titled Three Weeks in October: The Manhunt for the Serial Sniper. Before the trial, however, Chief Moose engaged in a publicity tour for his book on the sniper investigation, which jeopardized the prosecution. The tour included appearances on Dateline NBC, the Today show, and The Tonight Show. Assistant Prince William County Commonwealth's Attorney James Willett told The Washington Post, "Personally, I don't understand why someone who's been in law enforcement his whole life would potentially damage our case or compromise a jury pool by doing this." After his death, County Executive Doug Duncan defended Moose's actions, saying he got a "raw deal."

=== Later work ===
Until 2005, Moose served as the Squadron Commander of the 113th Security Forces Squadron, D.C. Air National Guard, United States Air Force. While Moose served with that unit, he deployed to Operation Katrina and served as military liaison and adviser to the New Orleans Police Department in the wake of Hurricane Katrina. Moose was promoted to lieutenant colonel after arriving in Hawaii and served as the 154th Security Forces Commander there.

Moose later graduated from the Honolulu Police Academy and reported for duty as one of the members of the Honolulu Police Department. On August 4, 2010, The Gazette reported that Moose was no longer employed at the department, having left in 2008.

As of September 2012, Moose was retired and living in Tampa, Florida. He applied with the Portland Bureau of Police for the position of chief but was denied.

== Death ==
Moose died at his home in Palm Harbor, Florida, on November 25, 2021, at age 68 while watching a football game on TV.

== In popular culture ==
- Moose is portrayed by Charles S. Dutton in the 2003 T.V. film D.C. Sniper: 23 Days of Fear.

== Bibliography ==
- Fleming, Charles; Moose, Charles A. (September 15, 2003). Three Weeks in October: The Manhunt for the Serial Sniper. New York City: E.P. Dutton. ISBN 9780525947776. OCLC 52547597.

Police appointments
Preceded by Thomas Evans	Chief of the Montgomery County Department of Police; August 2, 1999 – June 2003	Succeeded by William C. "Bill" O'Toole (acting)
