= Montgomery County Police Department =

Primary law enforcement agency of Montgomery County, Maryland, United States

Montgomery County Department of Police
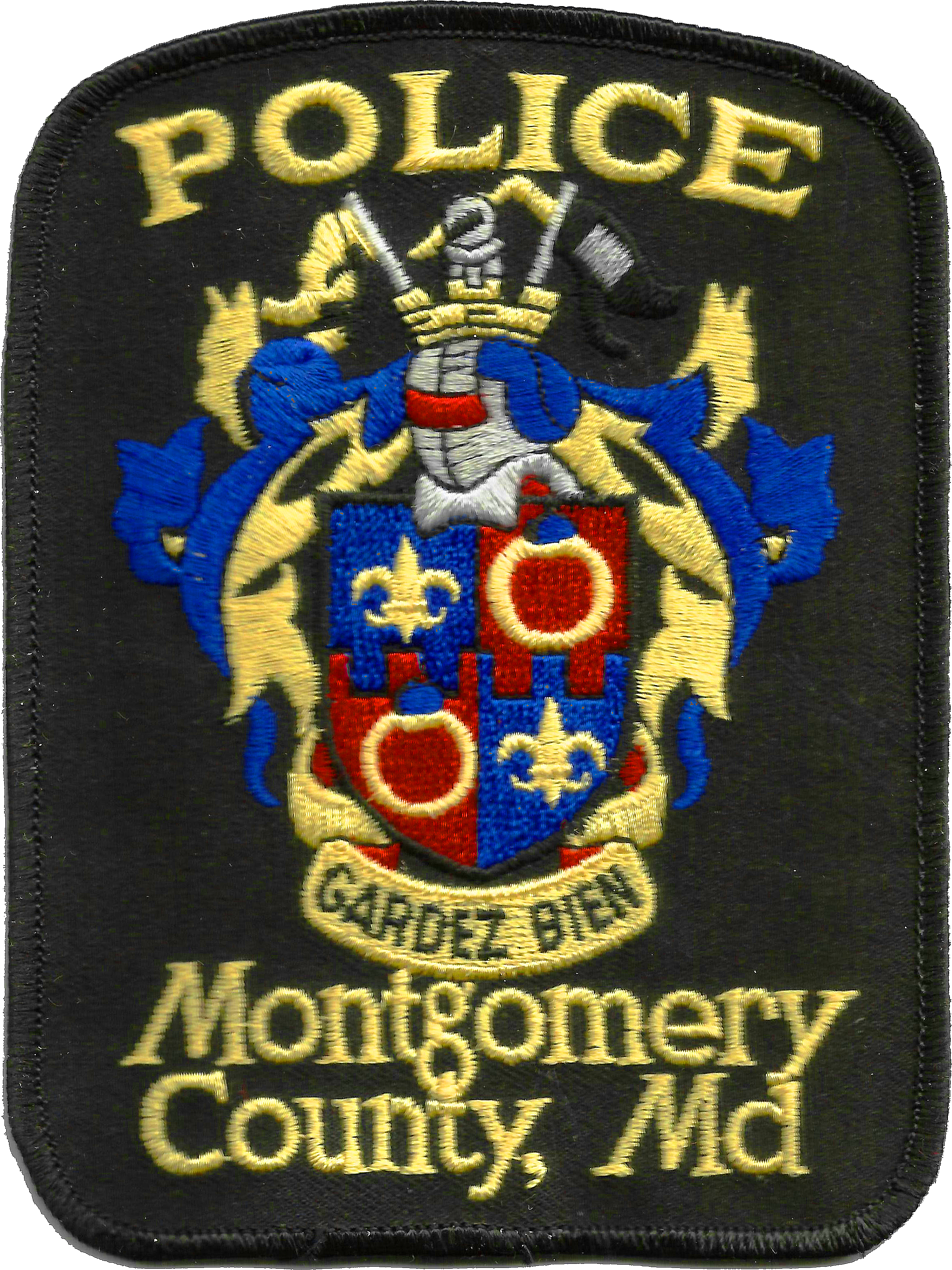
- Patch

- Seal

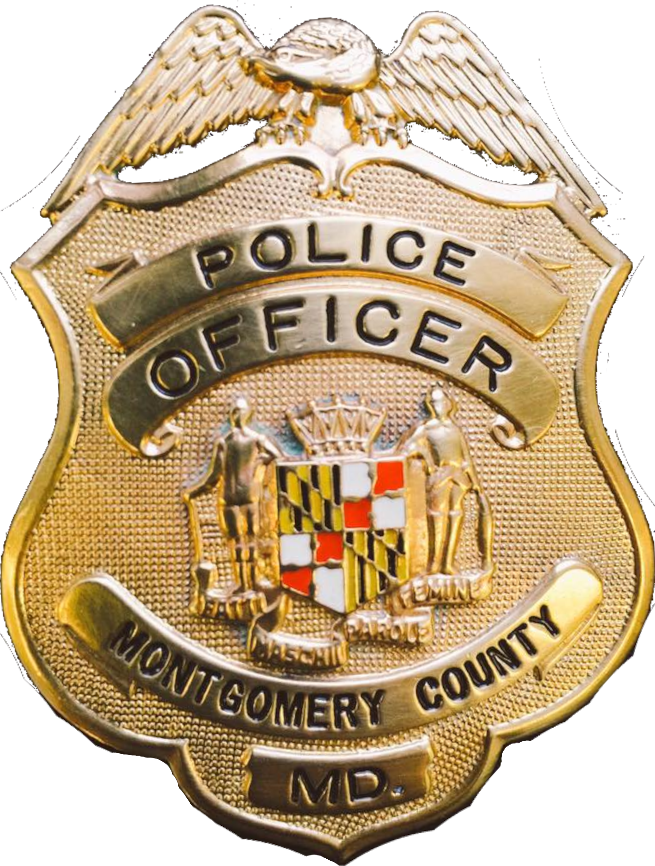
- Badge

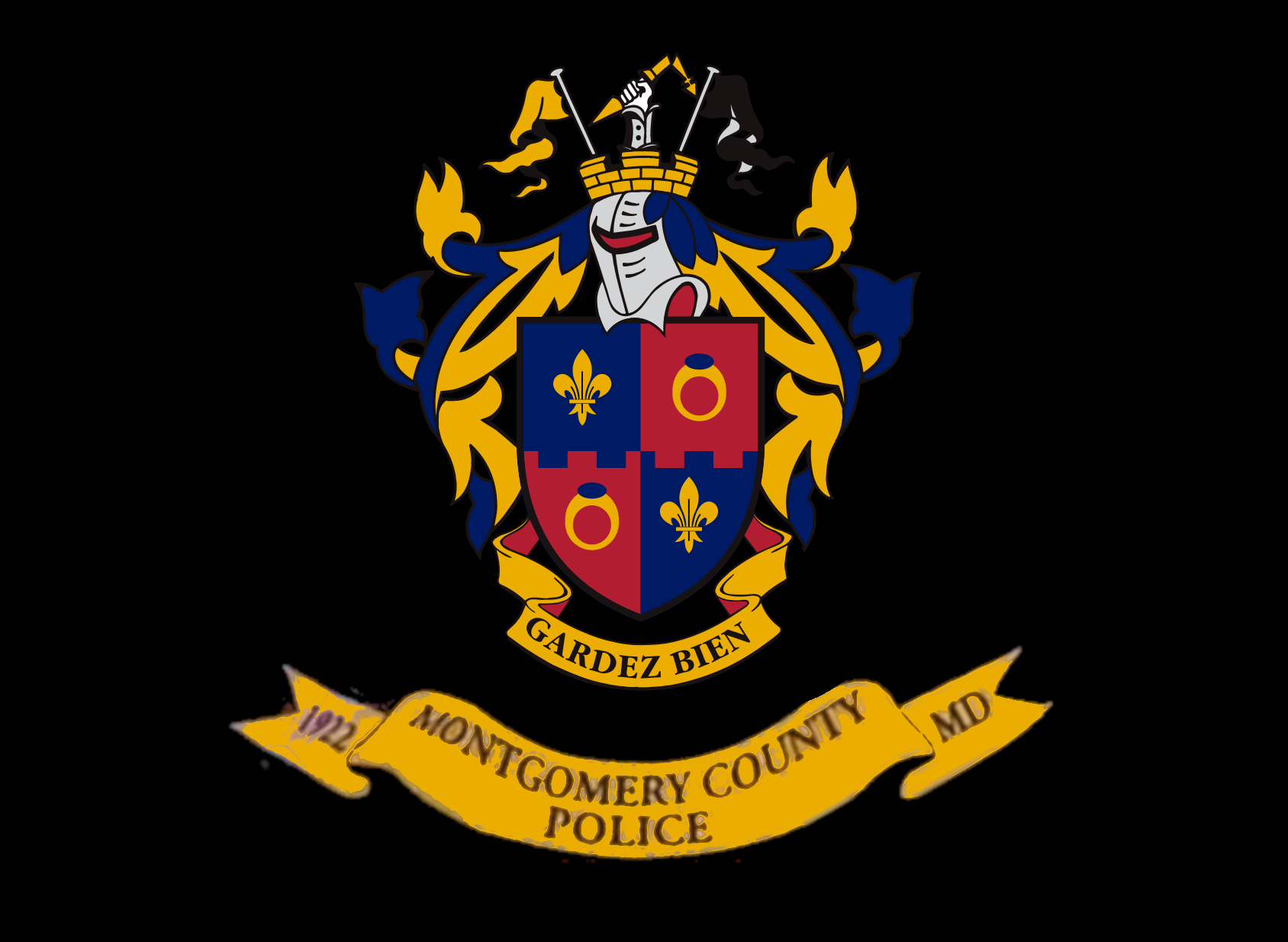
- Flag
- Common name: Montgomery County Police Department
- Abbreviation: MCPD (Note: MCP is used in official contexts. MCDP was used in the past, but has since been depreciated.)
- Motto: "We begin with pride, and end with excellence!"

Agency overview
- Formed: July 1, 1922; 104 years ago (Note: Established July 1, 1922, went into operation on July 4, 1922.)

Jurisdictional structure
- Operations jurisdiction: Montgomery, Maryland, United States
- Legal jurisdiction: Montgomery County, Maryland
- General nature: Local civilian police

Operational structure
- Headquarters: Montgomery County Public Safety Headquarters, 100 Edison Park Drive, Gaithersburg, Maryland, 20878; 39.113030°N 77.236462°W
- Sworn members: ▼1,172 of 1,275 (2025)
- Agency executive: Darren Francke, Acting Chief of Police

Facilities
- Cruisers: Dodge Charger, Ford Crown Victoria Police Interceptor, Ford Police Interceptor Sedan, Chevrolet Impala, Chevrolet Suburban, and Chevrolet Tahoe
- Armored cars: Lenco BearCat
- Mobile command centers: Prevost Motor Coach

Website
- Montgomery County Police Department

The Montgomery County Police Department (MCPD), officially the Montgomery County Department of Police (MCP or MCDP), is a nationally accredited agency and the primary law enforcement agency of Montgomery County, Maryland, providing the full spectrum of policing services to the entire county, including the Potomac River.

Established in July 1922, the MCPD is headquartered in Gaithersburg, Maryland, and in addition to its primary duties, it also provides aid and assistance to other police departments including the Metropolitan Police Department of the District of Columbia, and in neighboring jurisdictions such as the District of Columbia, Howard County, Baltimore City, and Prince George's County as requested by authority.

== History ==
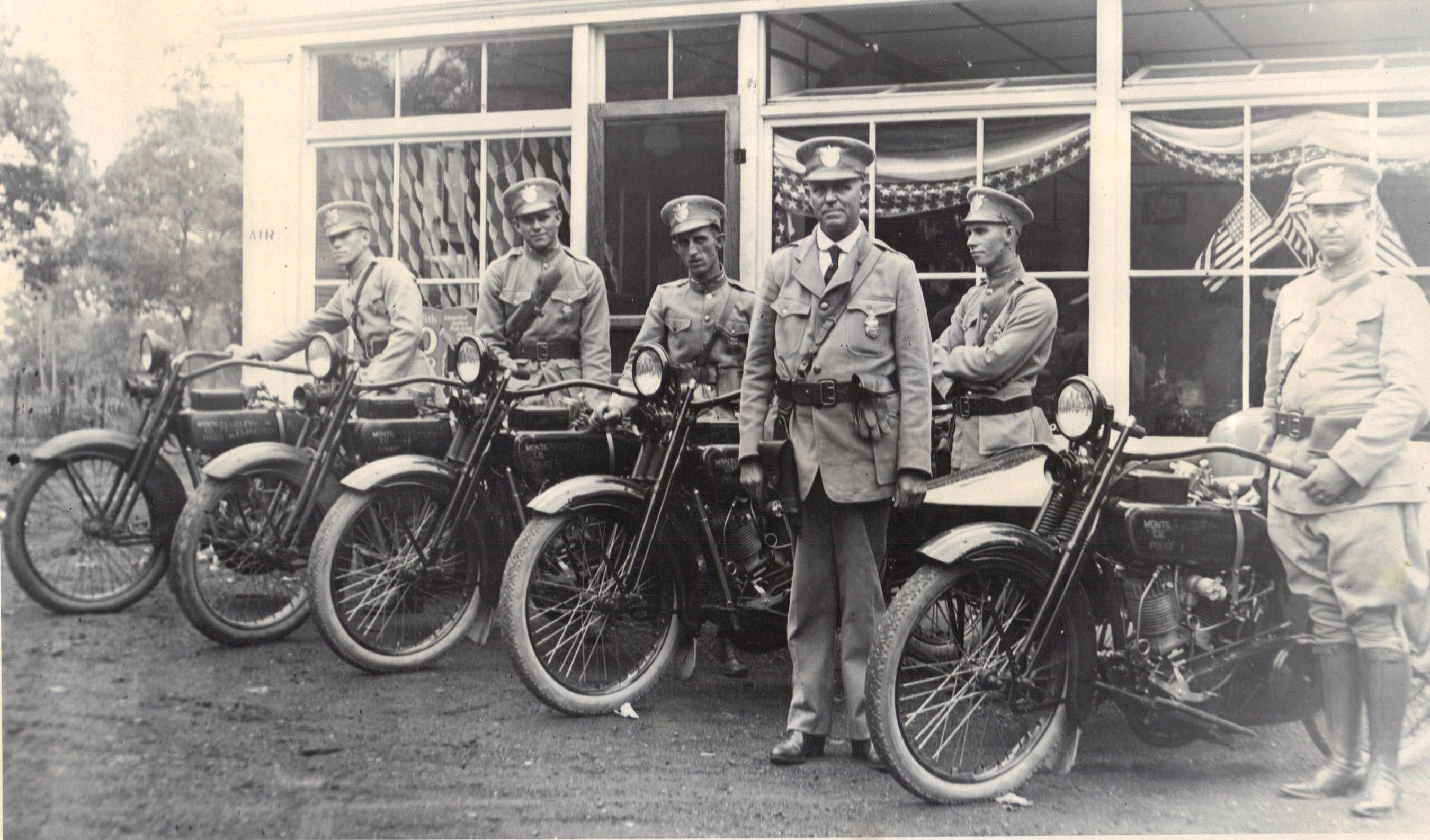
The MCPD's first chief with several policemen on the MCPD's first day of operations in July 1922.

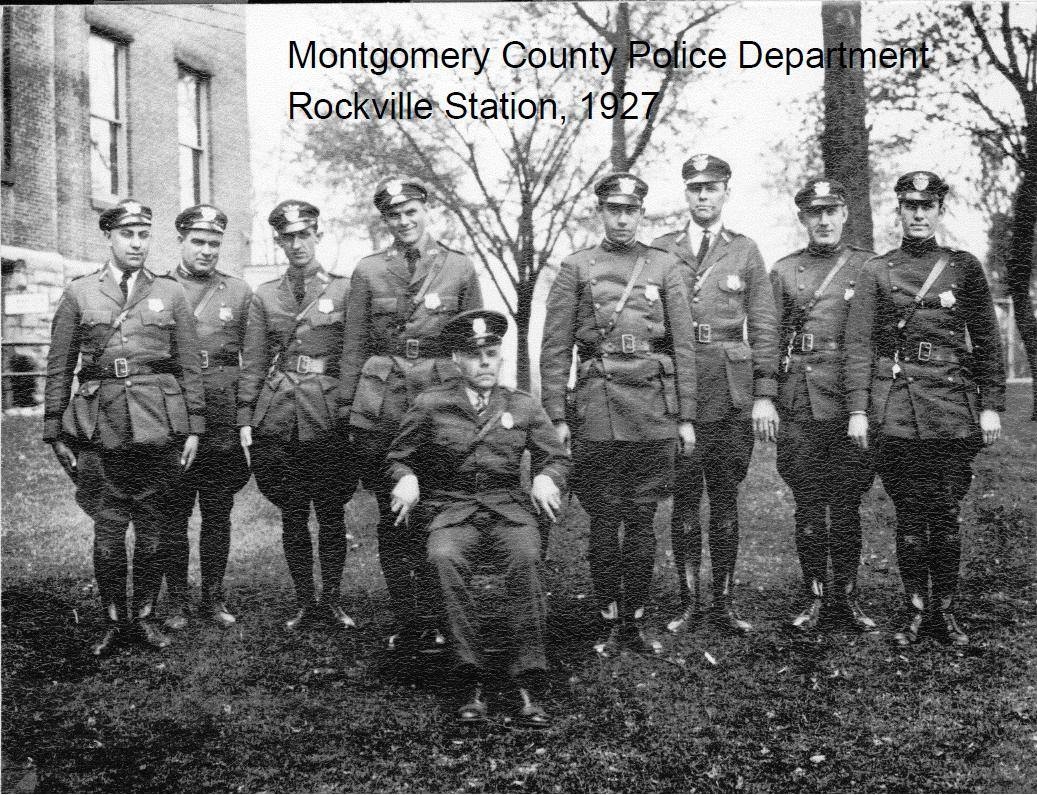
MCPD policemen at Rockville in 1927.

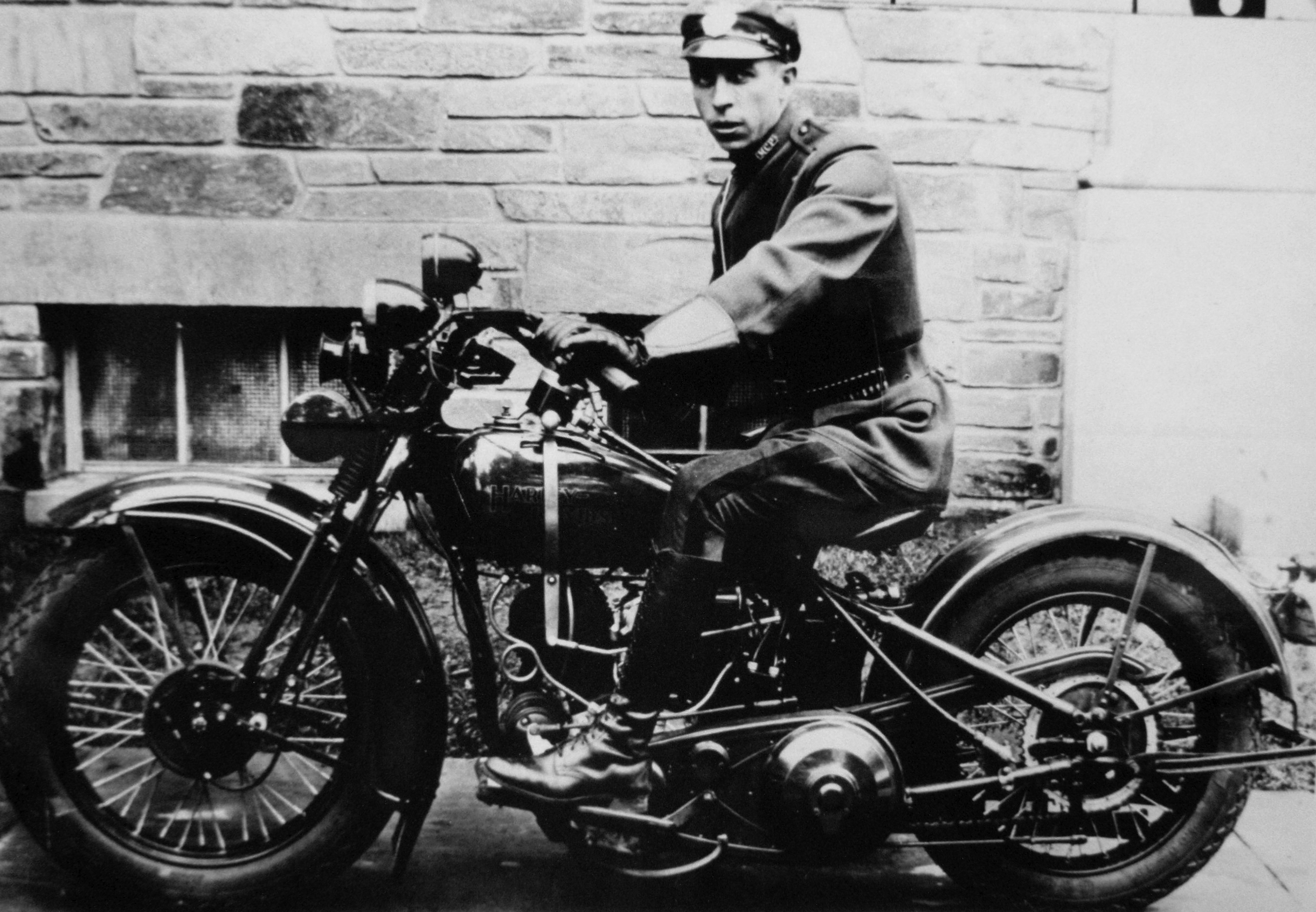
An MCPD policeman in 1929 on a motorcycle.

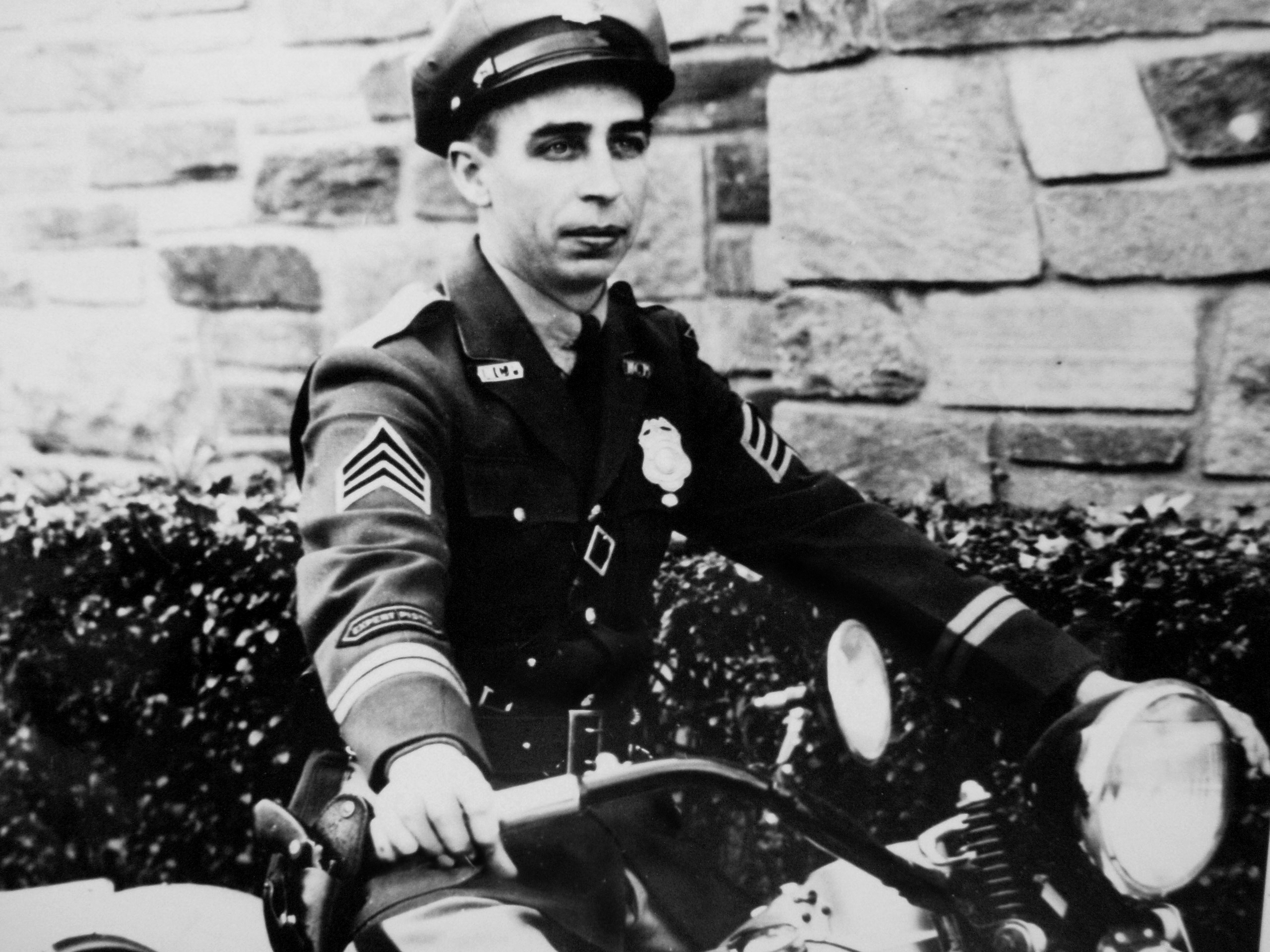
An MCPD policeman in 1929 on a motorcycle.

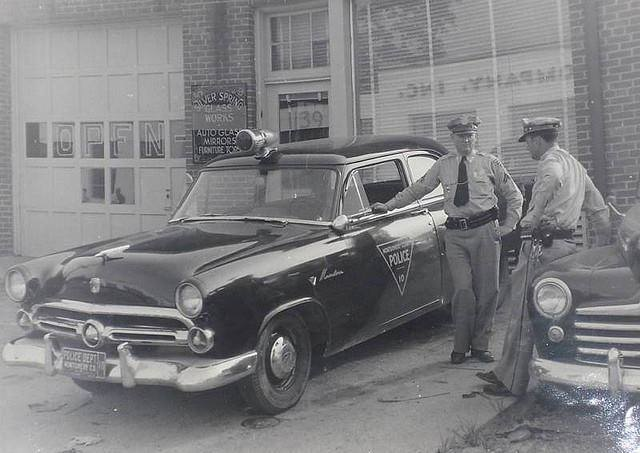
MCPD policemen at Silver Spring in 1952.

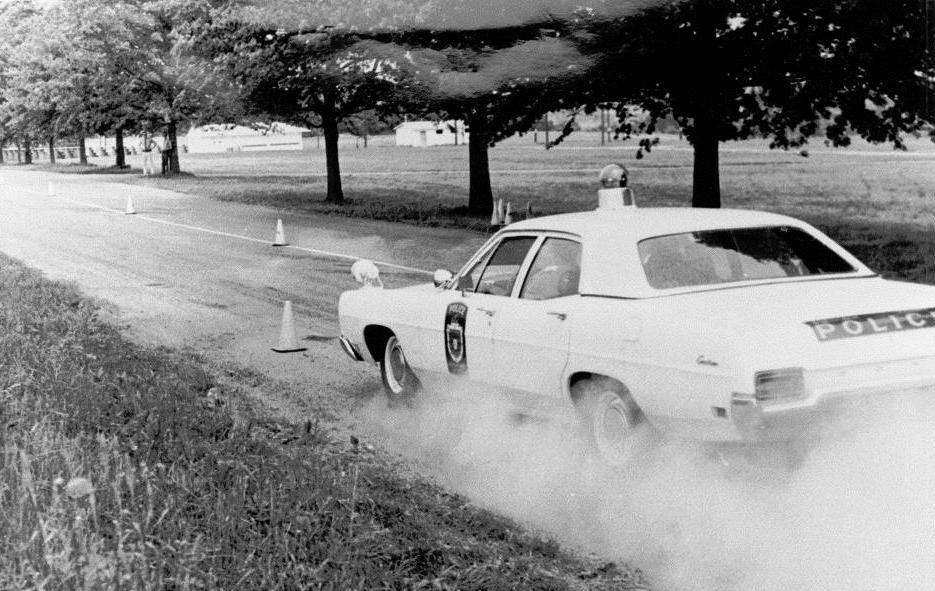
An MCPD car at the Montgomery County Fairgrounds in 1968.

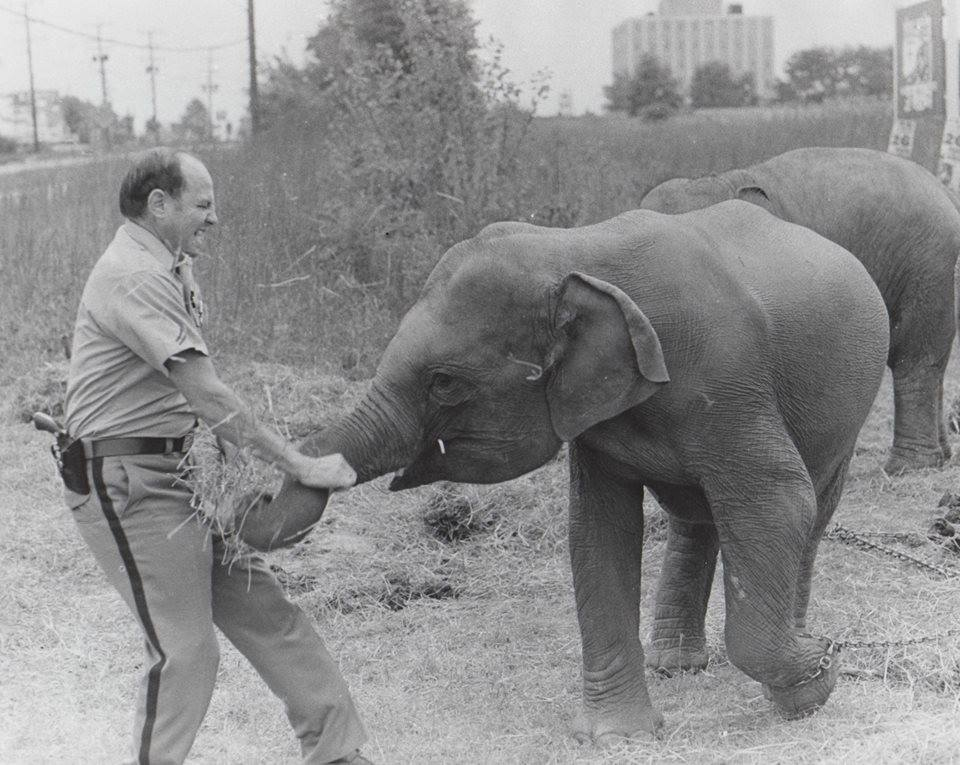
An MCPD corporal with an elephant at a carnival in 1971.

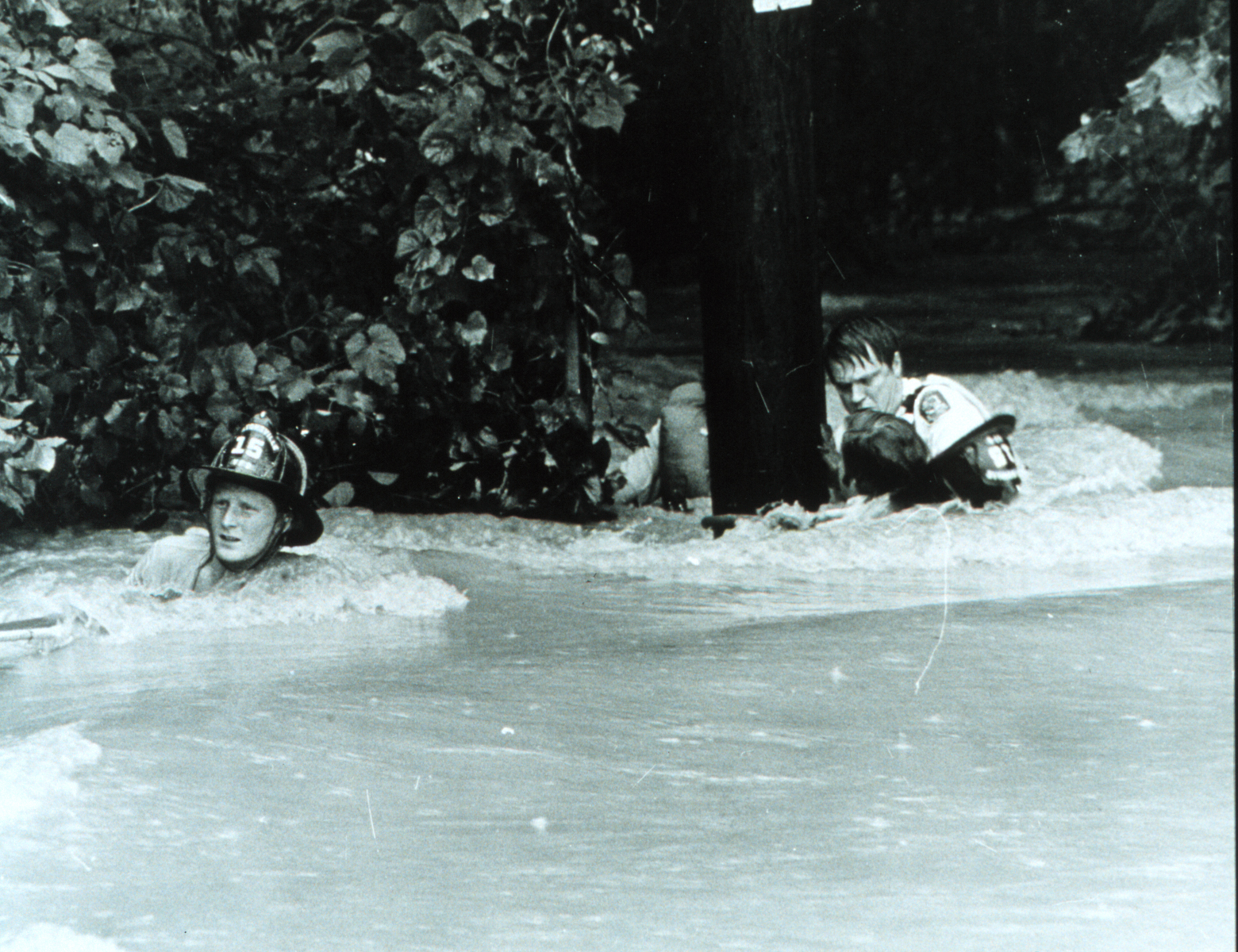
Firemen and an MCPD policeman rescue a person during flooding in 1975.

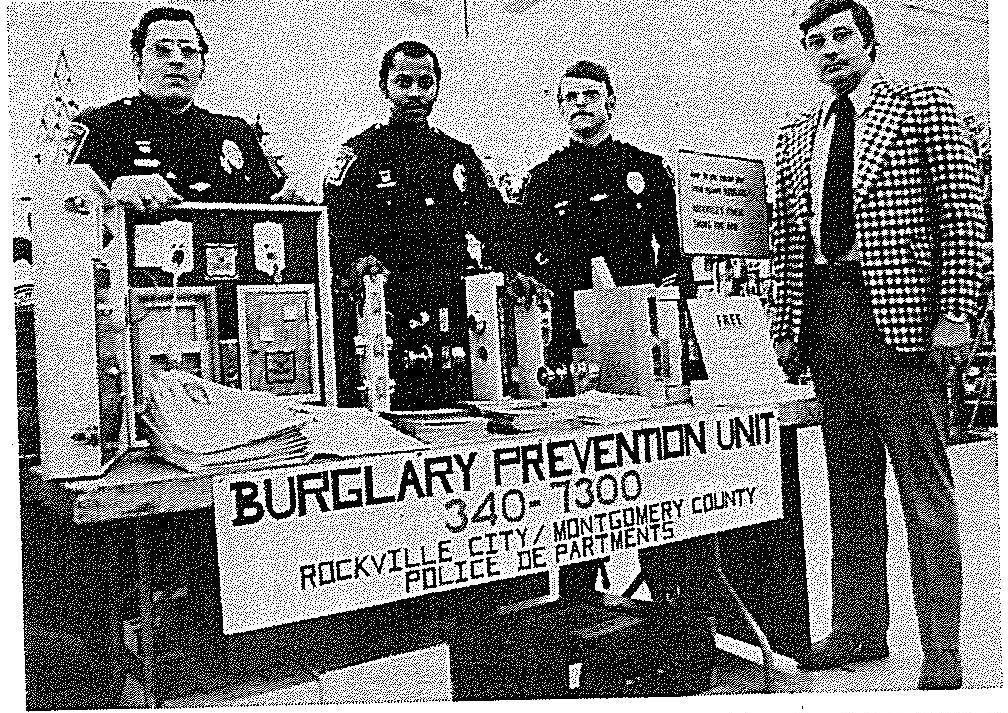
An MCPD sergeant with Rockville City P.D. officers in 1976.

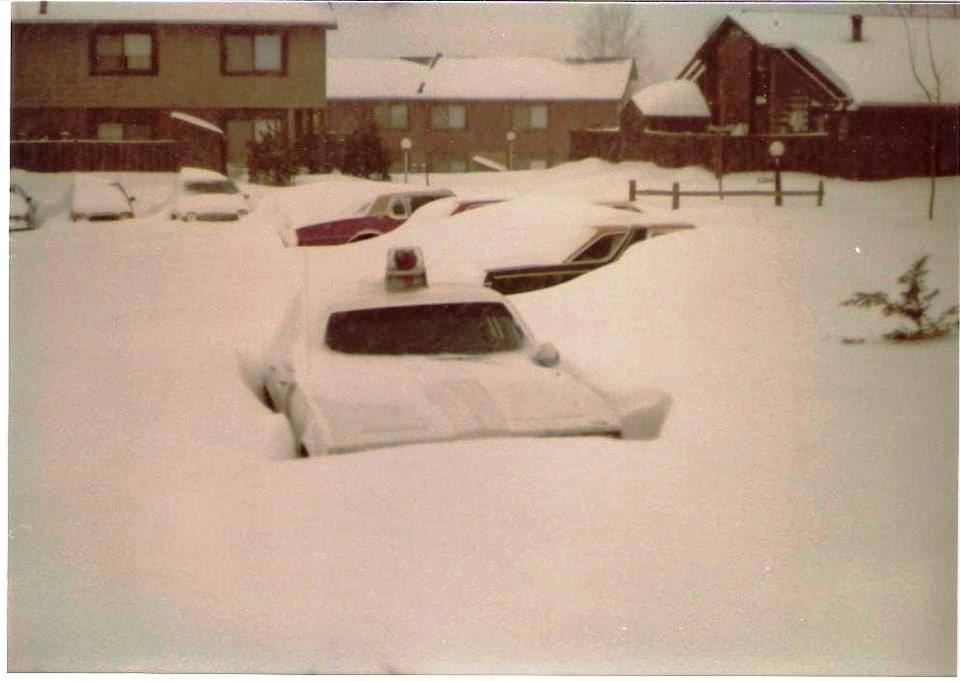
MCPD cruiser buried under snow in February 1979

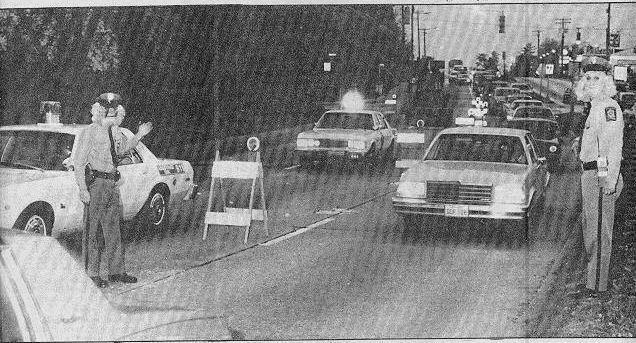
MCPD officers directing traffic in 1981 while dressed as clowns.

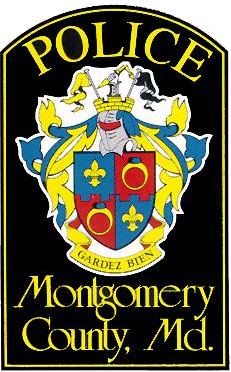
MCPD decal displayed on the doors of MCPD police cars from the mid-1980s to the early 2000s.

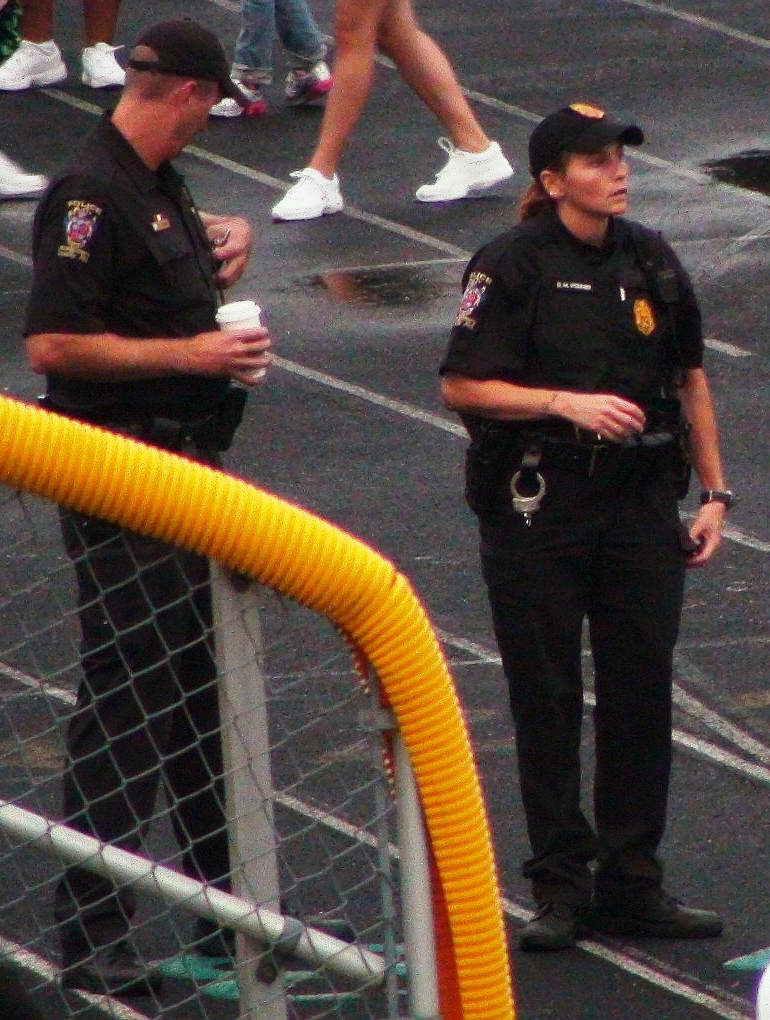
Two MCPD officers provide security at the annual "Battle for the Kings Trophy" football game in September 2008. They are wearing the current black uniform, which was introduced in 2008.

=== 1922–1955: Founding and early years ===
The MCPD was established in early July 1922, absorbing some responsibilities from the Montgomery County Sheriff's Office (MCSO) through Chapter 259 of the Acts of 1922. At the time, the department was designated to consist of three to six officers that were appointed to two-year terms by the Montgomery County Board of Commissioners, with one officer designated as the chief.

The first chief of the MCPD was Charles T. "Chas" Cooley, who was from Frederick County, Maryland and served as a soldier in the Spanish–American War.

In July 1924, William L. Aud became the MCPD's chief. He was the Sheriff of Montgomery County from 1917 to 1919.

In 1927, the department was enlarged to twenty officers by Chapter 299 of the Acts of 1927.

From 1922 until 1935, the Montgomery County Board of Commissioners designated one police officer from within the MCPD's ranks to serve as its chief. In 1935, through Chapter 9 of the Acts of 1935, the regulations were changed so that the chief could be appointed from any source, at the discretion of the Montgomery County Board of Commissioners. In 1948, when Montgomery County transitioned to a charter government, the responsibilities of appointing chiefs for the MCPD was transferred to the Montgomery County Executive.

In 1927, the MCPD had 20 policemen. In 1931, the MCPD had 27 policemen, and by 1939, the MCPD had 35 policemen.

From 1927 to 1954, the MCPD was headquartered at the lower level of the Montgomery County Courthouse.

In February 1939, Charles M. Orme became the MCPD's chief. He fought as a soldier in World War I and previous served in the Montgomery County Sheriff's Office as a deputy from 1925 to 1939. Under his tenure the MCPD grew from 35 policemen to 177 policemen.

=== 1955–1976: Expansion ===
By 1955, the MCPD had grown to have 177 policemen.

In April 1955, James Stephen McAuliffe Sr. became the MCPD's chief. He was the 11th policeman ever hired by the MCPD.

Over the course of several decades, the MCPD would eventually grow to over a thousand officers.

In 1971, Kenneth Winstead Watkins became the MCPD's chief. Serving with the department since 1946, he was the last policeman to serve as the MCPD's head when it was still known as "superintendent". After his retirement, the title of the MCPD's head policeman was changed to "chief".

On March 29, 1971, Carol A. Mehrling joined the MCPD as its first female police officer. She would eventually become its first female police chief in 1995, more than two decades later.

=== 1976–1979: DiGrazia and departmental politics ===
In 1976, the title of the head of the MCPD was changed from superintendent to chief. Also that same year, Robert DiGrazia, a former Boston Police Commissioner, became the MCPD's chief, intending to brings new changes to the department. However, he became unpopular with many officers in the department as they believed he was too sharply critical and demanding of them. As a result, he was removed from his position by the county executive in December 1978. Donald E. Brooks became the MCPD's acting chief after DiGrazia was dismissed.

=== 1979–1991: Crooke and modernization ===
In 1979, a computerized fingerprinting system was installed for use by the MCPD.

In April 1979, Bernard Crooke, a former MPDC officer, became the MCPD's chief. He would serve in that capacity before dying in office in February 1988. After Crooke died, Donald E. Brooks became the MCPD's acting chief.

By the 1980s, the MCPD had 750 officers, and by September 1991 it had 849 officers.

In March 1981, MCPD policeman Philip Carl Metz was shot and killed while confronting a gang of armed robbers at a Silver Spring business.Security guard David Myers was also killed by the robbers.

=== 1991–1999: Mehrling and the NAACP ===
On September 24, 1991, Clarence Edwards became the chief of the MCPD, becoming the department's first African American chief as well as the first African American chief of a Maryland county-level police department. He was a former U.S. Park Police (USPP) officer for 21 years and had joined the USPP in September 1963. He also served in the Maryland-National Capital Park Police.

However, in December 1994, Edwards was relieved of his position by Montgomery County Executive Douglas Duncan, who had taken office that same month, a move which angered the local chapter of the NAACP. Edwards was succeeded by interim MCPD chief Carol A. Mehrling, who joined the MCPD on March 29, 1971. On February 2, 1995, Mehrling was chosen by Duncan to be the MCPD's fourteenth chief, becoming the department's first female chief. The MCPD was, at the time, the second-largest police department in the United States to be headed by a woman.

On February 17, 1997, the local Fraternal Order of Police (FOP) body voted overwhelmingly in passing a resolution of no confidence in Mehrling's abilities as chief, claiming that she was not doing enough to defend MCPD officers against accusations of misconduct and abuse by the NAACP. As a result of these allegations, the United States Department of Justice (DOJ) launched an investigation into the operations of the MCPD. On November 17, 1998, Mehrling announced that she would retire from the MCPD and did so on February 3, 1999, with Thomas Evans becoming the acting chief.

Throughout much of the 1990s, the MCPD faced numerous allegations of abuse, excessive force, and misconduct, including fatal officer-involved shootings in Wheaton and Silver Spring in April 1999 and March 1999, respectively. These accusations resulted in the U.S. Justice Department investigating the department for three years. Although there had been certain public scrutiny about specific police shootings involving MCP officers, it has been determined that they were all justified under the Constitution, federal and state laws, and department policy. The only exception is when an on duty MCP officer shot and wounded a romantic rival in the Wheaton area. The MCP and the state's attorney's office have a long-standing practice of investigating, prosecuting and terminating corrupt MCP officers, although it is a very uncommon occurrence within MCP compared to other large police departments across the United States.

=== 1999–2003: Moose and the D.C. sniper attacks ===
On August 2, 1999, Charles A. Moose became the fifteenth MCP chief, during a time when the MCP was nearing the end of a three-year-long U.S. Department of Justice investigation into allegations of misconduct and abuse committed by its officers. Moose was a U.S. Air Force commissioned officer and was the former chief of the Portland Bureau of Police.

By the end of 1999, crime in Montgomery County was lower than at the start of the decade, with total violent crime down 16 percent, rapes down 23 percent, robberies down 8 percent, aggravated assaults down 19 percent, and overall crime down 9 percent.

On January 14, 2000, a Memorandum of Agreement (MOA) was signed between the U.S. Department of Justice and the MCP regarding abuses and misconduct committed by the latter. The agreement detailed how the MCPD was to address and correct the misconduct and abuses committed by its officers.

On March 12, 2002, John A. King, on Moose's recommendation, was unanimously approved as the MCPD's assistant chief by the county council, after Alan G. Rodbell retired on December 23, 2001, to fill a law enforcement job position in Arizonan city of Scottsdale.

In October 2002, several of the D.C. sniper attacks occurred in Montgomery County. Moose and the MCP played a major role in the ensuing investigation. In June 2003, Moose resigned amid controversy over a book he helped author alongside Charles Fleming, that detailed Moose's experiences during the D.C. sniper attacks. The county government objected in stating that the MCPD chief was not allowed to profit privately from official duties; the book itself was released on September 15, 2003. In the aftermath, Moose eventually became a police officer in Honolulu, Hawaii. During the sniper case, he was frequently criticized for his lack of public speaking abilities during interviews with the news media.

=== 2003–2004: O'Toole and the search for a new chief ===
After resigning as the MCPD's chief in June 2003, Moose was succeeded by William C. "Bill" O'Toole, who served as the MCPD's acting chief until a new chief could be found. O'Toole was the MCPD's assistant chief previously; he himself retired from the MCPD on August 1, 2006.

=== 2004–2019: Manger, downsizing, and a new headquarters ===
On January 30, 2004, J. Thomas Manger, a former officer of the Fairfax County Police Department (FCPD), became the sixteenth MCPD chief. Manger is a graduate of the FBI National Academy and served as the FCPD's acting chief before becoming its chief.

On October 5, 2007, ten MCPD officers were charged in a "double-dipping" probe. The accused officers were alleged to have improperly billed Grady Management, a Silver Spring real estate firm, for more than 8,900 hours for which they also were compensated by the police. The accused improperly earned more than $200,000. Each officer involved in the scheme were either fired, resigned, forced to retire or otherwise disciplined depending on their individual involvement.

From its founding until 2008, the MCPD wore khaki-colored uniforms. However, in 2008, the MCPD switched to its current black-colored uniforms. These uniforms are usually worn with a ballistic vest on top of the uniform's shirt, with the word "POLICE" embroidered onto the back. However, formal uniforms for ceremonial occasions are still khaki and olive-colored.

In 2010, the MCPD shot and killed an armed hostage-taker at the Discovery Communications building in Silver Spring after he attempted to chase after his hostages when they attempted to flee. An MCP officer that was in the area of the building at the time was awarded for his actions for placing himself inside of the building, communicating with on duty officers and saving multiple lives.

The MCPD's total number of personnel declined from 2010 to 2012 due to the recession and budget county problems. In 2010, the MCPD had an authorized strength of 1,200 sworn officers, but by January 2012 it only had 1,159.

Until 2012, the MCPD was headquartered at 2350 Research Boulevard in the county seat of Rockville. In 2012, the MCPD moved its headquarters from Rockville, where it had been headquartered for forty years, to the Montgomery County Public Safety Headquarters, located at 100 Edison Park Drive in Gaithersburg, Maryland, located around four miles from the former MCPD headquarters. The process of transferring the MCPD's headquarters to its new location took around two years at a cost of 108.5 million dollars. The remodeling and moving phases took an extended period of time due to the legal requirements of housing a police district station along with administrative offices in the same building. The MCPD shares the building with other county agencies, such as the Montgomery County Fire and Rescue Service (MCFRS) and Montgomery County Office of Homeland Security. The MCP's 1st District station was also consolidated into this new headquarters. The building which houses the headquarters, located near Lake Placid, was built in the 1960s and was originally used by the National Geographic Society, and later by General Electric (GE). The building was leased to the county government before a purchase date of 2014 was finalized. Since the building officially opened as the county public safety HQ, at least two incidents have occurred (a small explosive device was detonated, and a separate incident of an entranceway glass door being shattered). The county is seeking ways to improve security at the location.

On the evening of January 30, 2014, an MCPD officer shot and killed his son at their home in Gaithersburg as the latter was stabbing the officer's wife, who later died.

In early 2015, during the riots in Baltimore, the MCPD dispatched a Lenco BearCat to assist the Baltimorean police.

In December 2015, an MCP officer was struck and killed in Rockville by an automobile being driven by an inebriated person. That officer, Noah Leotta, was working a DUI enforcement assignment at the time. Maryland legislature later passed Noah's Law which provides enhanced penalties for persons arrested for driving under the influence.

=== 2019–present: The Jones era ===
In April 2019, J. Thomas Manger retired as the MCP's chief of police. He was succeeded by Marcus Jones a few months later. On March 26, 2021 the department released January 14, 2020 body camera footage showing two officers screaming at and handcuffing a five-year-old special needs child in crisis at Silver Spring and threatening that he should be beaten, and confirmed that the officers remained employed.

In January 2021, members of the MCPD's SERT unit were present at the U.S. Capitol during the riot there by supporters of outgoing U.S. President Donald Trump.

== Organization ==
The MCPD is divided into four bureaus and the Office of the Chief.

=== Headquarters ===
The MCPD is headquartered at the J. Thomas Manger Public Safety Headquarters at 100 Edison Park Drive, Gaithersburg, Maryland, near Lake Placid. It was formerly headquartered at 2350 Research Boulevard in the county seat of Rockville until the early 2010s.

=== Office of the Chief ===
The Office of the Chief is responsible for the day-to-day activities of the MCP. This section also contains Community Services, Internal Affairs, Legal and Labor, Media Services, and Stress Management.

The current chief of police is long-time MCP officer Marc Yamada, who was sworn in on July 2, 2024. He was preceded in office by Marcus Jones, who had held the office since November 8, 2019. He is the MCPD's 17th chief. In 2019, the public safety headquarters was renamed honoring former Chief J. Thomas Manger.

Until 1976, the MCP's head policeman was known as its "superintendent", after which it was changed to its present title of "chief".

=== Field Services Bureau ===
The Field Services Bureau contains the general policing districts and the Special Operations Division.

=== Special Operations Division ===
The Special Operations Division (SOD), consists of the K-9 Unit, Emergency Services Unit, Police Community Action Team, Special Events Response Team, and Tactical Unit.

=== Investigative Services Bureau ===
The Investigative Services Bureau is responsible for providing specialized police services such as (but not limited to) the following: Criminal Investigations Division (CID), Auto Theft, Fraud, Family Crimes, Major Crimes, and Special Investigations Division.

=== Management Services Bureau ===
The Management Services Bureau is a largely non-sworn, civilian support bureau. It contains Animal Control, Emergency Communications, Budget, Personnel, Training, and other support services.

=== Districts ===
- 1st District, Rockville
- 2nd District, Bethesda
- 3rd District, Silver Spring
- 4th District, Wheaton
- 5th District, Germantown
- 6th District, Montgomery Village

== Fleet ==
The Montgomery County Police Department utilizes a fleet of Ford, Dodge and Chevrolet patrol cars ("cruisers" per MCP terminology) Ford Crown Victoria Police Interceptors, Dodge Chargers, Chevrolet Impalas, Chevrolet Caprices, Dodge Magnums, Harley-Davidson Police Edition motorcycles, and others. The vehicles use LED lightbars with blue "steady-burn" diodes as an option during routine patrols for high visibility purposes, although it is currently not required by department policy. In the 2000s, the MCP used third-generation Dodge Caravans.

The MCP also uses Lenco BearCats for emergency situations that require an armored vehicle. The Emergency Services Unit (ESU) utilizes other types of vehicles to supplement the fleet in a support capacity for the Emergency Response Team (ERT ... also known as SWAT) and for major incidents. These include a command bus and other support vehicles.

Officers are issued the Glock Model 17 9mm caliber pistol as the standard issue sidearm. Other Glock 9mm models are available to officers depending on their rank and assignment. The Glock Model 17 replaced the previous issue Models 22, 23 and 27 in .40 caliber. Prior to the Glock, officers were issued a 9mm Beretta 92 Beretta which did not have a safety on it. It was a custom Beretta model created for MCP and other police agencies. Detectives were once issued Smith & Wesson pistols as their sidearm. Patrol officers also have the option of carrying a Remington 870 12 gauge shotgun, a Benelli 12 gauge shotgun, or a 5.56 caliber patrol rifle, similar to an M4 carbine.

The issued MCP badge has been manufactured by Hahn, Blackinton and CW Nielsen. By 2019, the contracted manufacturer of issued MCP badges is Smith & Warren. It has changed once from a plain, common style Maryland shield badge to an eagle-topped badge. The badge wording, from top to bottom, reads POLICE (RANK) MONTGOMERY COUNTY MD. MCP also uses the Maryland coat of arms as the center piece of the badge instead of a full color state seal.

The national non-emergency contact number for the MCP and Montgomery County Emergency Communications Center (ECC) is (301) 279–8000. Locally, residents and visitors can call 911 in case of emergencies ONLY. The ECC is staffed 24/7/365. Montgomery County borders Washington, D.C., and is home to over 1 Million residents and growing. The population increases during the average work week. Montgomery County suffers from the usual urban and suburban crime rate such as homicide, rape, robbery, assault and other violent, gang and drug-related crime as any other major metropolitan area. When comparing Montgomery County to police staffing and population, it is slightly below the expected national average. Montgomery County is considered to be one of the wealthiest and most populated areas of the United States. Development, traffic congestion and crime is at its peak, and there are currently plans at the state and local levels to address it.

=== Current vehicles ===
Vehicle	Type	Country
First-generation Dodge Charger	Cruiser	United States (origin); Canada (manufacture)
Second-generation Dodge Charger	Cruiser	United States (origin); Canada (manufacture)
Dodge Durango	SUV	United States
Ford Police Interceptor Sedan	Cruiser	United States
Ford Econoline	Van	United States
Ford Police Interceptor Utility	SUV	United States
Lenco BearCat	Armored car	United States
Ford Crown Victoria Police Interceptor	Cruiser	United States (origin); Canada (manufacture)
Ninth generation Chevrolet Impala	Cruiser	United States (origin); Canada (manufacture)
Eleventh generation Chevrolet Suburban	Cruiser	United States
Fourth generation Chevrolet Tahoe	Cruiser	United States
Prevost Motor Coach	Mobile command center	Canada
Chevrolet Caprice PPV	Cruiser	Australia

=== Past vehicles ===
Vehicle	Type	Country
Third-generation Dodge Caravan	Minivan	United States
First generation Ford Crown Victoria	Cruiser	United States
Fourth generation Chevrolet Caprice	Cruiser	United States
Eighth generation Chevrolet Impala	Cruiser	United States (origin); Canada (manufacture)

== List of chiefs and superintendents ==
No.	Chief		Rank	Life	Tenure
1		Charles T. "Chas" Cooley	Chief	1869 – July 7, 1930 (aged 61)	July 4, 1922 – July 1924
2		William L. Aud	Chief		July 1924 – July 1926
3		Alvie Arville Moxley	Chief	June 16, 1876 – June 14, 1963 (aged 86)	July 1926 – January 1935
4		William A. Garrett	Chief		July 1935 – February 1939
5		Charles M. Orme	Chief	March 7, 1892 – July 14, 1970 (aged 78)	February 1939 – June 1940
6		Andrew M. Newman	Chief		August 1940 – February 1943
7		Leslie H. Carlin	Chief		February 1943 – December 1946
8		Charles M. Orme	Chief	March 7, 1892 – July 14, 1970 (aged 78)	December 1946 – March 1955
9		James Stephen McAuliffe Sr.	Colonel	January 16, 1907 – October 31, 1996 (aged 89)	April 1955 – April 1971
10		Kenneth Winstead Watkins	Colonel	October 21, 1923 – April 14, 2001 (aged 77)	1971–1976
11		Robert Joseph diGrazia	Chief	February 24, 1928 – April 26, 2018 (aged 90)	November 1976 – December 1978
		Donald E. Brooks			December 1978 – April 1979
12		Bernard D. Crooke Jr.	Chief	1933 – February 23, 1988 (aged 54)	April 1979 – February 23, 1988
		Donald E. Brooks			February 23, 1988 – September 1991
13		Clarence Edwards	Colonel	February 14, 1940 – present	September 24, 1991 – December 1994
14		Carol Ann Mehrling	Chief	1949 – June 14, 2015 (aged 67)	1995 – February 3, 1999
		Thomas Evans	Chief (acting)		February 1999 – August 2, 1999
15	Charles Alexander Moose	Charles Alexander Moose	Chief	1953 – November 25, 2021 (aged 68) Palm Harbor, Florida, U.S.	August 2, 1999 – June 2003
		William C. "Bill" O'Toole	Chief (acting)		June 2003 – January 30, 2004
16		J. Thomas Manger	Chief		January 30, 2004 – 2019
17		Marcus Jones	Chief		2019–2024
18		Marc Yamada	Chief		July 1, 2024- September 18, 2026

== Ranks ==
Rank	Insignia	Duties/Responsibilities.
Chief of Police		The chief of police is in charge of running the entire department. The rank insignia for the MCPD's chief is a gold-colored U.S. eagle, similar to the silver ones worn by colonels and nautical captains in the U.S. military.
Assistant Chief of Police	Commander, MCPD	The rank insignia for an MCPD Assistant Chief of Police is a silver oak leaf, similar to a lieutenant colonel's rank insignia in the U.S. military. The Assistant Chief of Police is the commander of a MCPD Bureau.
Commander	Commander, MCPD	The rank insignia for an MCPD commander is a gold oak leaf, similar to a major or lieutenant commander's rank insignia in the U.S. military. Commander is a title rather than a rank and is given to captains in charge of a district.
Captain		The rank insignia for an MCPD captain are two gold bars, similar to the two silver bars worn by captains in the U.S. Army. They are usually worn embroidered on shoulder straps. Captains are in charge of a division, act as countywide supervisors, and assist assistant chiefs of police.
Lieutenant		The rank insignia for an MCPD lieutenant is a single gold-colored bar, similar to that worn by second lieutenants and ensigns in the U.S. military. Lieutenants act as shift commanders in a district and as unit or section commanders.
Sergeant		The rank insignia for an MCPD sergeant are three gold-colored chevrons. They are metallic pins and are worn on the shirt collar of uniforms. Sergeants are field supervisors and may act as Squad commanders.
Corporal		The rank insignia for an MCPD corporal are two gold-colored chevrons. They are embroidered onto black cloth rectangles and worn as shoulder straps, as well as metallic pins and worn on the shirt collars of uniforms.
Police officer III		
Police officer II		
Police officer I		

=== Historical ranks ===
Rank	Insignia	Notes
Chief of police (2002)		During the tenure of Chief Charles A. Moose in the early 2000s, the MCPD chief's rank insignia consisted of two five-pointed yellow stars, identical to the chief's rank insignia in the Portland Bureau of Police and similar to the silver ones worn by major generals or rear admirals in the U.S. military.

== Awards and decorations ==
Award	Ribbon	Criterion
Medal of Valor		The MCPD's highest award, the Medal of Valor is awarded to an MCPD officer for heroism and distinction in extremely hazardous circumstances. In order to be considered for this honor, an employee must exhibit unusual bravery in the performance of duty while facing the threat of death of serious injury.
Life Saving Award		The Life Saving Award is given to an MCPD officer who makes a major contribution toward saving the life of another by providing essential medical treatment prior to arrival of Emergency Medical Services (EMS) personnel.
Commendation		A Commendation is awarded to an MCPD officer who makes a significant contribution to the mission of the department beyond the ordinary call of duty. It recognizes those incidents wherein the member's courage, resourcefulness, tenacity, and/or perseverance in the performance of the employee's duties has resulted in the protection of life or property, the prevention of a major crime, or the apprehension of an armed and dangerous criminal.

== Patches ==
Patch	Dates of usage	Notes
	1930s–1955	
	1955–1972	
	1972–1981	Patch used by the MCPD during much of the 1970s and the early 1980s. It was the last patch to feature the old Montgomery County coat of arms before it was redesigned in 1978.
	1981–present	In 1978, the Montgomery County coat of arms were redesigned by the British College of Arms, and thus, a new patch incorporating the new design was adopted shortly thereafter. The patch is five inches in height. The patch was slightly modified when uniforms changed to black in 2008. The current patch is taller, but still retains the same design. The standard uniform patch is also now worn on both sleeves since the uniform change in 2008; previously they were only worn on one sleeve. A badge patch may be worn on uniforms depending on assignment. The badge patch is either gold/yellow in color or "subdued". There are also newer, subdued K9 unit and ERT patches in use. Most division patches are similar in shape, size and colors with various designations of divisions or units.

== In popular culture ==
- The Montgomery County Police Department is featured in a chapter of the 1996 novel, Unintended Consequences.
- The Montgomery County Police Department is briefly featured in the 2001 episode of The X-Files television show, "Essence".
- The Montgomery County Police Department is featured prominently in the 2003 television film D.C. Sniper: 23 Days of Fear, where they are shown investigating a string of murders committed by a sniper in the county.
- The Montgomery County Police Department is featured in the 2005 comedy film The Pacifier.
- The Montgomery County Police Department is featured in the 2010 comedy film Red.
- The Montgomery County Police Department is featured in the third-season episode "Gerontion" of the television show Homeland in 2013, where they investigate a murder at a house in Bethesda.

== See also ==
- Shooting of Duncan Lemp
- List of law enforcement agencies in Maryland
- Montgomery County Sheriff's Office
