= Killing of Duncan Lemp =

2020 police killing

- Date: March 12, 2020; 6 years ago
- Location: Potomac, Maryland, U.S.
- Type: No-knock warrant, homicide by shooting, police killing
- Cause: Multiple gunshot wounds
- Participants: Montgomery County Police Department SWAT team
- Deaths: Duncan Socrates Lemp
- Charges: None

On March 12, 2020, Duncan Socrates Lemp was fatally shot at his home in Potomac, Maryland during a no-knock search by the Montgomery County Police Department's SWAT team. The police claimed Lemp possessed firearms illegally. While firearms were recovered at the scene, none of them were generally illegal for a person to own, and it remains unclear whether Lemp was actually legally prohibited from possessing firearms.

Police have said that Lemp was shot after confronting an officer during the execution of the unannounced raid. Lemp's family members have said through their attorney that, based on an eyewitness, that they believe Lemp was shot without warning while he was asleep. Lemp has since been described as a "martyr" for the boogaloo movement, some adherents to which believe Lemp was murdered by police because of his alleged involvement with the movement and his anti-government beliefs.

== Background ==
Lemp was a student and a software developer. Lemp, who was white, associated himself with the Three Percenters, a far-right paramilitary militia group, and had set up websites for other such organizations. He was a member of the United States Transhumanist Party, having joined on September 6, 2019. A week before the raid, Lemp posted a picture of two people armed with rifles on Instagram, with text referring to "boogaloo", a term used by the boogaloo movement as coded language for an anticipated war against the government or left-wing political opponents. Lemp had also made an Instagram post with a caption referring to the Three Percenters and a post captioned with the phrase sic semper tyrannis.

The police department stated that due to Lemp's criminal history as a juvenile, he was prohibited from legally possessing firearms until age 30. Lemp's lawyer replied the family was unaware of any convictions that would have prevented Lemp from possessing a firearm. An analysis by The Daily Beast was only able to find a traffic infraction in Lemp's Maryland court record, although they also said that a juvenile court charge could be unavailable to the public.

== Warrant ==
Montgomery County Police detectives received a tip from a confidential informant that Lemp illegally possessed firearms. The police "applied for and received a no-knock search warrant for the crimes of possession of a firearm by a prohibited person."

== Raid ==
The search warrant was served at approximately 4:30 AM by the Montgomery County Police Department's SWAT team.

"The officers entering the residence announced themselves as police and that they were serving a search warrant," police said. "Officers gave commands for individuals inside the residence to show their hands and to get on the ground." The Montgomery County Police Department said that Lemp "confronted" police and was shot by one of their officers. "Upon making contact with Lemp, officers identified themselves as the police and gave him multiple orders to show his hands and comply with the officer's commands to get on the ground," police said. "Lemp refused to comply with the officer's commands and proceeded towards the interior bedroom door where other officers were located." Police also stated that "Lemp was found to be in possession of a rifle and was located directly in front of the interior bedroom entrance door."

Lemp's family maintains that according to an eyewitness, the officers initiated gunfire and flash bangs from outside the house through Duncan's window without warning and while Lemp was sleeping. As of October 2020, neither body camera footage nor the arrest warrant had been released, despite public record requests by Reason magazine and MuckRock.

Lemp had rigged a booby-trap device that was designed to "detonate a shotgun shell at the direction of anyone entering" the bedroom. "After officers entered the bedroom, the other occupant of the room warned the officers to be careful of the device rigged to the exterior door," and Montgomery County bomb-squad technicians were brought in to "render the device safe," police said.

Three rifles and two handguns were recovered during the raid.

== Aftermath ==
=== State's Attorney investigation ===
The shooting was investigated by the State's Attorney's Office of Howard County, under a mutual agreement with Montgomery County where prosecutors from each of the two adjacent counties investigate fatal police shootings in the other.

The official report documented prosecutors discovering "numerous firearms, both pistols and rifles, located throughout Lemp's bedroom in plain view. There were a number of loaded firearm magazines located. These items were seen on the nightstand next to Lemp's side of the bed, on top of a desk, and on top of the table between a couch and the television. Additionally, there was a large amount of boxes of ammunition (at least 50) inside the closet and a bulletproof vest hanging on the wall."

The report concluded:

"Based upon a thorough review of all information known at this time, it is the opinion of the Howard County prosecutors, that the actions of the shooting officer on March 12, 2020 were reasonable under the circumstances. The threat caused by Duncan Lemp retrieving a rifle and pointing it at the officer, coupled with Lemp's apparent refusal to obey lawful commands, justified the shooting officer's use of deadly force. Accordingly, the Office of the State's Attorney for Howard County declines to file charges."

=== Family reaction ===
The Lemp family has claimed that Lemp was asleep next to his girlfriend when a police officer shot him. His girlfriend, who was pregnant, was forced to remain in the room for over an hour with Lemp after he was killed. "The Lemp family requests that the Montgomery County Police immediately release all body camera footage and audio from this horrific event," read a statement from Lemp family attorneys. Attorney Rene Sandler stated that nobody in the house the morning of the shooting had a criminal record, but juvenile records would be sealed and therefore unavailable. The Lemp family released a statement that said, "The police had obtained a search warrant for the home, however the search warrant makes no mention of any imminent threat to law enforcement or the community. No resident of the home had any criminal record." As of May 11, 2020, the warrant application had not been made available to Lemp's family.

=== Political reactions ===
After his death, Lemp became a "martyr" among some in the boogaloo movement who have speculated he was murdered for his participation with the movement, his anti-government beliefs, and involvement with other right-wing militias. Adherents of the boogaloo movement have adopted the phrases "we are Duncan Lemp" and "his name was Duncan Lemp", which The New York Times says they "repeat... like mantras". Boogaloo adherents have also posted to Lemp's girlfriend's Instagram account promising to someday avenge his death.

On March 15, 2020, the United States Transhumanist Party announced an "official week of mourning" in his honor.

A GoFundMe campaign to pay for Lemp's funeral and his family's legal fees raised, as of August 2020, over $17,000.
