= D.C. sniper attacks =

2002 series of coordinated shootings in the Washington, D.C. area

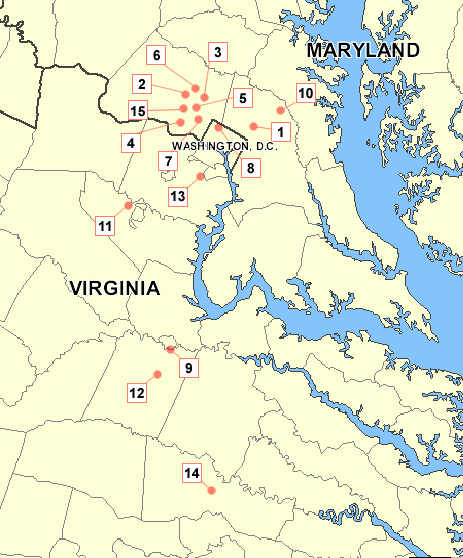
- The locations of the Beltway sniper attacks on a map of the Washington, D.C. area
- Location: Maryland, Virginia, Washington, D.C. and Arizona, Alabama, Louisiana, Georgia, and Washington
- Date: February 16 – September 26, 2002 (preliminary shootings); October 2–24, 2002 (sniper attacks)
- Target: Civilians in the Washington metropolitan area
- Attack type: Spree killing, mass murder
- Weapons: Bushmaster XM-15 rifle; .22 caliber pistol (preliminary shooting)
- Deaths: 16 (10 in sniper attacks, 6 in preliminary shootings)
- Injuries: 8 (3 in sniper attacks, 5 in preliminary shootings)
- Perpetrators: John Allen Muhammad and Lee Boyd Malvo
- Motive: Extortion, anti-White racism (John Muhammad); Thrill killing (Lee Malvo)

The D.C. sniper attacks (also known as the Beltway sniper attacks) were a series of coordinated shootings that occurred over three weeks in October 2002 throughout the Washington metropolitan area, consisting of the District of Columbia, Maryland, and Virginia. These were preceded by a series of murders and robberies in several states starting in February 2002. Five people were killed, and five others were injured in the preliminary shootings, and ten people were killed and three others were critically wounded in the October shootings.

In total, the snipers killed 16 people and wounded 8 others in a 10-month span. They shot 16 people in the D.C. metro area based on both events that took place that year. The perpetrators, John Allen Muhammad (41 years old at the time) and Lee Boyd Malvo (17), traveled in a blue 1990 Chevrolet Caprice sedan. In 2003, Muhammad was sentenced to death. He was executed by lethal injection in 2009. Malvo, a juvenile, received six life sentences in Maryland and three in Virginia.

== Preliminary shootings ==
On February 16, 2002, 21-year-old Keenya Nicole Cook was shot and killed by Lee Malvo at the front door of her aunt's home in Tacoma, Washington. Cook's aunt, Isa Nichols, had been good friends with John Allen Muhammad's ex-wife Mildred and had encouraged her to seek a divorce.

On March 19, 2002, Jerry Taylor, 60, was killed by a single shot to the chest fired from long range as he practiced chip shots at a Tucson, Arizona, golf course. Muhammad's sister lived near the golf course, and he was visiting her at the time of the shooting.

On August 1, 2002, John Gaeta, 51, was changing a tire slashed by Malvo at a parking lot in Hammond, Louisiana. Malvo then shot him in the neck. The bullet exited through Gaeta's back, and he pretended to be dead while Malvo stole his wallet. Gaeta ran to a service station after Malvo left and discovered that he was bleeding; he went to a hospital and was released within an hour.

On September 5, 2002, at 10:30 p.m., Paul LaRuffa, a 55-year-old pizzeria owner, was shot six times at close range while locking up his Italian restaurant in Clinton, Maryland. LaRuffa survived the shooting, and his laptop computer was found in Muhammad's car when he and Malvo were arrested.

On September 14, 2002, 22-year-old Rupinder "Benny" Oberoi, an employee of the Hillandale Beer & Wine liquor store in Silver Spring, Maryland, was shot in the back outside the store. Oberoi survived the shooting. The shooting was officially linked to Muhammad and Malvo by the Montgomery County Police Department.

On September 15, 2002, Muhammad Rashid was shot while closing Three Roads Liquors in Brandywine, Maryland. Rashid later identified Malvo as the shooter in court.

On September 21, 2002, at 12:15 a.m., 41-year-old Million A. Woldemariam was fatally shot in the head and back with a .22-caliber pistol in Atlanta, Georgia. Woldemariam was helping the owner of a Sammy's Package Store close up for the night when the shooting occurred.

Nineteen hours later on the same day, Claudine Parker, a 52-year-old liquor store clerk in Montgomery, Alabama, was shot in the chest and killed during a robbery. Her coworker, 24-year-old Kellie Adams, was critically wounded with a shot through the neck but survived. Evidence found at the crime scene eventually tied this killing to the Beltway attacks and allowed authorities to identify Muhammad and Malvo as suspects, although this connection was not made until October 17, almost four weeks later.

On September 23, 2002, at 6:30 p.m., 45-year-old Hong Im Ballenger was shot in the head and killed with a Bushmaster rifle in Baton Rouge, Louisiana. Muhammad and Malvo were later linked to the killing.

In addition to the shootings above, Muhammad and Malvo were considered suspects in the May 27, 2002 murder of 37-year-old Billy Gene Dillon in Denton County, Texas.

== Attacks in the Washington, D.C. area ==
=== Washington, D.C. and Montgomery County, Maryland ===
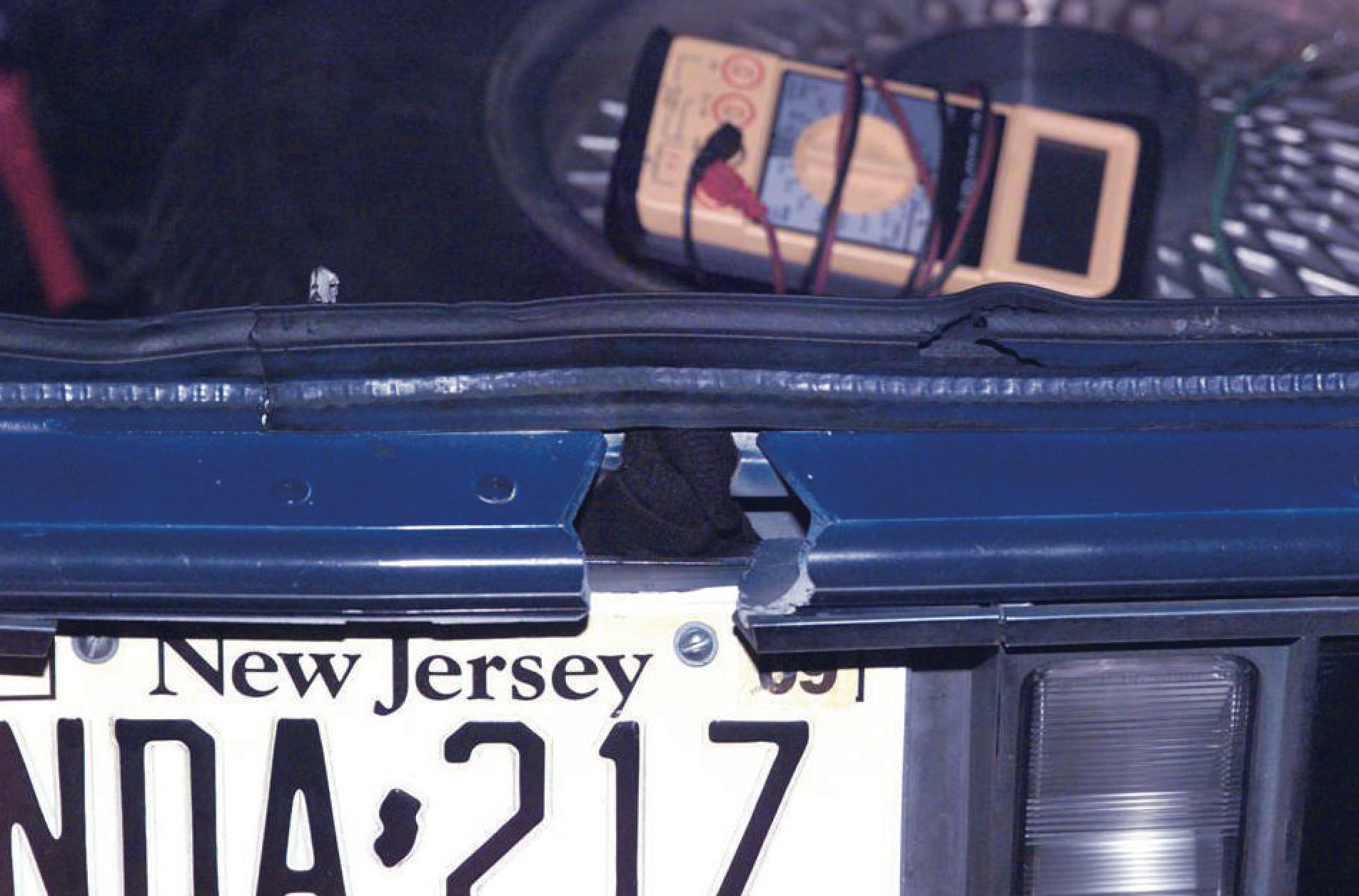
A hole was cut at the rear of the blue 1990 Chevrolet Caprice driven by Muhammad and Malvo, as a firing port to be used during their attacks. This allowed them to remain hidden and escape the scene following their attacks.

At 5:20 p.m. on Wednesday, October 2, 2002, a shot was fired through the window of a Michaels craft store in Aspen Hill, Maryland. The bullet narrowly missed Ann Chapman, a cashier at the store. Since no one was injured, the shot was assumed to be random, and no serious alarms were raised. However, approximately one hour later, at 6:30 p.m., James Martin, a 55-year-old program analyst at NOAA, was shot and killed at 2201 Randolph Road, in the parking lot of a Shoppers Food Warehouse grocery store located in Wheaton.

On the morning of October 3, four people were shot dead within a span of approximately two hours in Aspen Hill and other nearby areas in Montgomery County. Another was killed that evening in the Takoma neighborhood of the District of Columbia:

- At 7:41 a.m., James L. Buchanan, a 39-year-old landscaper known as "Sonny", was shot dead at 11411 Rockville Pike, near Rockville, Maryland. Buchanan was shot while mowing the grass at the Fitzgerald Auto Malls.
- At 8:12 a.m., a 54-year-old part-time taxi driver, Prem Kumar Walekar, was killed in Aspen Hill in Montgomery County, while pumping gasoline into his taxi at a Mobil station at Aspen Hill Road and Connecticut Avenue.
- At 8:37 a.m., Sarah Ramos, a 34-year-old babysitter and housekeeper, was killed at the Leisure World Shopping Center in Norbeck. She had gotten off a bus at Connecticut Avenue and was seated on a bench reading a book at the time of her murder.
- At 9:58 a.m., 25-year-old Lori Ann Lewis-Rivera was killed while vacuuming her Plymouth Grand Voyager at the Shell station at the intersection of Connecticut and Knowles Avenues in Kensington, Maryland.
- The snipers waited until 9:20 p.m. before shooting Pascal Charlot, a 72-year-old retired carpenter, while he was walking on Georgia Avenue at Kalmia Road, in Washington, D.C. Charlot died less than an hour later.

In each shooting, the victims were killed by a single bullet fired from some distance, and, in each case, the killers struck and vanished. This pattern was not detected until after the October 3 shootings occurred.

Fear quickly spread throughout the region as news of the shootings spread. At a press conference meeting, Chief of Police for Montgomery County, Charles Moose, informed parents that schools were on a code blue alert, keeping children indoors. He said that the schools were safe. Many parents picked up their children early at school, not allowing them to take a school bus or walk home. Montgomery County Public Schools, District of Columbia Public Schools, and private schools went into a lockdown, with no recess or outdoor physical education classes. Other school districts in the area also took precautionary measures, keeping students indoors. During the course of the shootings, law enforcement agencies from neighboring states became embedded in the investigation through telephone tips.

Police had only a few pieces of evidence to work with. One initial report said that right after the Silver Spring attack, someone had reportedly heard a popping noise and had seen a white box truck hurriedly leaving the scene. After the murder in Washington, D.C., witnesses began telling police that they had seen a blue Chevrolet Caprice rather than a white box truck. The police initially believed that all of the murders were carried out with a .223 caliber rifle.

=== Virginia and other areas ===
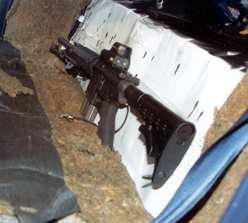
The stolen Bushmaster XM-15 rifle used by Muhammad and Malvo during their attacks. It was fitted with a Bushnell holographic weapon sight, a bipod, and a 20-round magazine at the time of their capture.

At this point, Malvo and Muhammad started covering a wider area and taking two or three days between shootings:

- On October 4, 43-year-old homemaker Caroline Seawell was shot and wounded in the chest at 2:30 p.m. in the parking lot of another Michaels store at Spotsylvania Mall in Spotsylvania, while she was loading purchases into her minivan. By this point, hundreds of journalists had converged to cover the unfolding events. School officials reassured the public that they were taking every measure possible to protect children, by tightening security and canceling all outdoor activities. The weekend passed without incident, but when lessons resumed, so did the shootings.
- On October 7, at 8:09 a.m., Iran Brown, a 13-year-old student, was shot in the chest and critically wounded as he arrived at Benjamin Tasker Middle School on 4901 Collington Road in Bowie, Maryland, in Prince George's County Brown survived the attack and ultimately testified at Muhammad's trial. At this crime scene, the authorities discovered a shell casing as well as a Tarot card (the Death card) inscribed with the phrase "Call me God" on the front and, on three separate lines on the back: "For you mr. Police." "Code: 'Call me God'." "Do not release to the press." Despite police efforts to honor the request not to release information about the card to the press, details were made public by WUSA-TV and then by The Washington Post, just one day later.
- On October 9 at 8:18 p.m., 53-year-old civil engineer Dean Harold Meyers was shot dead while pumping gasoline at a Sunoco gas station on 7203 Sudley Road in Prince William County, Virginia, near the city of Manassas.
- On the morning of October 11 at 9:30 a.m., 53-year-old businessman Kenneth Bridges was shot dead while pumping fuel at an Exxon station off Interstate 95 in Spotsylvania County, Virginia, near Fredericksburg.
- On October 14, at 9:15 p.m., 47-year-old Linda Franklin (née Moore), an FBI intelligence analyst who was a resident of Arlington County, Virginia, was shot dead in a covered parking lot at Home Depot in Fairfax County, Virginia, just outside Falls Church at Seven Corners Shopping Center. The police received what seemed to be a very good lead after the October 14 shooting, but it was later determined that the witness was inside the Home Depot at the time and was lying. The witness, Matthew Dowdy, was subsequently convicted of interfering with the investigation.

By this point due to public concerns about safety, gas stations had begun to put tarps up to conceal their customers (see below). Some people crouched over to pump gas, while others waited in their cars. Malvo and Muhammad did not commit any more shootings for five days before striking again.

On October 19 at 8:00 p.m., 37-year-old Jeffrey Hopper was shot in a parking lot near the Ponderosa Steakhouse at State Route 54 in Ashland, Virginia, about 90 miles (140 km) south of Washington, near Interstate 95. His wife Stephanie called out to passersby, who phoned for an ambulance, enabling Hopper to survive his injuries after being transported to VCU Medical Center. Authorities discovered a four-page letter from the shooter in the woods that demanded $10 million and made a threat to children.

On October 21, Richmond-area police arrested two men, one with a white van, outside a gas station. The men turned out to be undocumented immigrants with no connection to the shooter. The pair were subjected to cavity searches and remanded into federal custody (what was then the Immigration and Naturalization Service, which subsequently deported them).

On the next day, October 22, Ride On bus driver Conrad Johnson, 35, was shot at 5:56 a.m. while standing on the steps at the 14100 block of Grand Pre Road in Aspen Hill, Maryland. Johnson died of his injuries. On the same day, Chief Moose released part of the content of one of the shooter's letters, in which he declares, "Your children are not safe, anywhere, at any time."

While no shootings occurred on October 23, the day is significant for two events. First, ballistics experts confirmed Johnson as the 10th fatality in the Beltway shootings. Second, in a yard in Takoma Park, Maryland, police searched with metal detectors for bullets, shell casings, or other evidence that might provide a link to the shooters. A tree stump believed to have been used for target practice was seized.

== Public's reaction ==
With seven shooting victims, including six deaths, in the first 15 hours of the D.C. area spree, the North American media soon devoted extensive coverage to the shootings. By the middle of October 2002, all news television networks provided live coverage of the aftermath of each attack, with the coverage often lasting for hours at a time. The Fox show America's Most Wanted devoted an entire episode to the shooters in hopes of aiding in their capture. Much of the coverage of the case in The New York Times was written by Jayson Blair and subsequently found to be fabricated. The ensuing scandal resulted in the resignations of the newspaper's two top editors, Howell Raines and Gerald Boyd.

During the weeks when the attacks occurred, public fear mounted of the apparently random shootings, especially in relation to such sites as service stations and parking lots of large stores, where many had taken place. People pumping gasoline at gas stations kept moving, hoping to present a smaller target. Also, many people with access tried to fuel their vehicles at the naval base of the National Naval Medical Center in Bethesda, Maryland, as they felt it was safer inside the guarded fence. Government buildings such as the White House, U.S. Capitol, and Supreme Court building, and memorial tourist attractions at the National Mall in Washington, D.C., also received heightened security. For the duration of the attacks, United States Senate pages received a driven police escort to and from the United States Capitol every day and were not allowed to leave their residence hall for any reason except work. Drivers of white vans and box trucks were viewed with suspicion from other motorists as initial media reports indicated the suspect might be driving such a vehicle.

After the specific threat against children was delivered, many school groups curtailed field trips and outdoors athletic activities based upon safety concerns. At the height of the public fear, some school districts, such as Henrico County Public Schools and Hanover County Public Schools, after the Ponderosa shooting, closed school for the day. Other schools, such as the MJBHA, canceled all outdoor activities after the shooting at the Connecticut and Aspen Hill intersection. Others changed after-school procedures for parents to pick up their kids to minimize the amount of time children spent in the open. Extra police officers were placed in schools because of this fear. Joel Schumacher's film Phone Booth was deemed potentially upsetting enough that its release was delayed until April 2003.

== Investigation ==
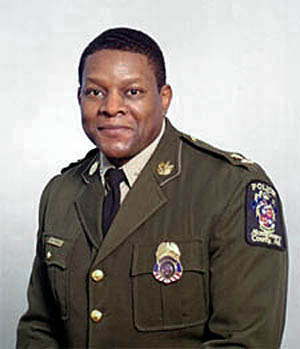
Charles Moose, Chief of the Montgomery County Department of Police

The investigation was publicly headed by the Montgomery County Police Department (MCPD) and its chief, Charles Moose. The Bureau of Alcohol, Tobacco, Firearms and Explosives (ATF), US Marshals Service, FBI, the U.S. Secret Service, the Virginia Department of Transportation, and police departments in other jurisdictions where shootings took place provided assistance in the investigation.

Police responded within minutes to reports of attacks during the three weeks of the sniper attacks, cordoning off nearby roads and highways and inspecting all drivers, thereby grinding traffic to a halt for hours at a time. Police canvassed the area, talking to people, and collected surveillance tapes.

By Friday night, October 4, the five shootings on October 3 and two on October 2 were forensically linked to the same gun.

Eyewitness accounts of the attacks were mostly confused and spotty. Hotlines set up for the investigation were flooded with tips. Early tips from eyewitnesses included reports of a white box truck with dark lettering on the outside and two men inside speeding away from the Leisure World shopping center. Police across the area and the state of Maryland were pulling over white vans and trucks. A gray car was spotted speeding away after the October 4 shooting in Spotsylvania.

The shooter attempted to engage the police in a dialogue, compelling Moose to tell the media cryptic messages intended for the sniper. At several scenes of shootings, Tarot cards were left as calling cards, including one Death card upon which was written "Call me God" on the front and on the back, on three separate lines, the words "For you mr. Police." "Code: 'Call me God'." "Do not release to the press." This information was leaked to the press and misquoted often as "I am God" or similar misquotes of the actual words on the tarot card. At later scenes of crimes the shooter left long, handwritten notes sealed inside plastic bags, including a rambling one that demanded $10,000,000 and threatened the lives of children in the area.

A telephone call from the shooter(s) was traced to a pay telephone at a gasoline station in Henrico County, Virginia. Police missed the suspects by a matter of a few minutes and initially detained occupants of a van at another pay telephone at the same intersection.

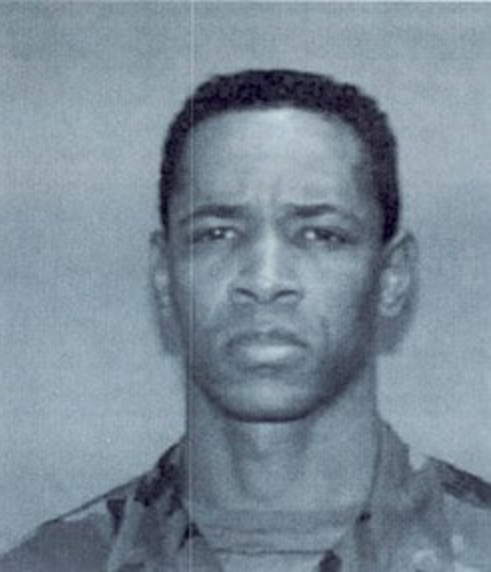
John Allen Muhammad during his time in the military.

On the phone call, the sniper, boasting of his cleverness, mentioned a previous unsolved murder in "Montgomery". This was identified as the September 21 shooting at a liquor store in Montgomery, Alabama. On October 17 authorities said they matched Malvo's fingerprint found at the Benjamin Tasker Middle School site with one lifted from the Montgomery liquor store scene. After confirming the link between these two crime scenes, the FBI was able to link these fingerprints to Malvo due to his fingerprinting during a previous arrest in Washington state. After further research into Malvo's background, the police found he had close ties to John Allen Muhammad.

=== Lack of progress ===
Despite an apparent lack of progress publicly, federal authorities were making significant headway in their investigation and they developed leads in Washington state, Alabama, and New Jersey. They learned that Muhammad's ex-wife, who had obtained a protective order against him, lived near the Capital Beltway in Clinton, an unincorporated community in suburban Prince George's County, Maryland, adjacent to Montgomery County. Information was also developed about an automobile purchased in New Jersey by Muhammad.

Police discovered that the New Jersey license plate number issued for Muhammad's 1990 Chevrolet Caprice had been checked by radio patrol cars several times near shooting locations in various jurisdictions in several states, but the car had not been stopped because law enforcement computer networks did not indicate that it was connected to any criminal activity and they were focused exclusively on the "white van".

On October 3, 2002, police in Washington, D.C., stopped the Caprice for running two stop signs, two hours prior to the shooting of Pascal Charlot. Witnesses later reported seeing a Caprice near the scene of his shooting.

On October 8, 2002, Baltimore Police Department investigated a dark blue Chevrolet Caprice parked near the Jones Falls Expressway at 28th Street in Baltimore with a person sleeping inside it. The officers were concerned that the driver's license was from Washington state while the vehicle was registered in New Jersey. Although the vehicle was suspicious enough for them to investigate, and it fit the description of a vehicle associated with the shooting in Washington, D.C. five days earlier, the officers did not question the occupants extensively, nor did they search the vehicle.

On October 23, Montgomery County police chief Charles Moose relayed a cryptic message to the sniper, "You have indicated that you want us to do and say certain things. You have asked us to say, 'We have caught the sniper like a duck in a noose.' We understand that hearing us say this is important to you". Moose asked the media "to carry the message accurately and often". This statement may refer to a Cherokee fable.

Around midnight on October 24, 2002, authorities issued a media alert to the public to be on the lookout for a dark blue 1990 Chevrolet Caprice with New Jersey license plates. For the public, as well as for law enforcement agencies throughout the region, this was a major change from the mysterious "white box truck" earlier sought based upon reported sightings.

=== Arrest ===
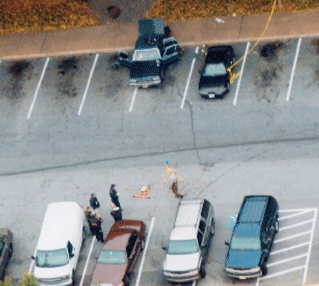
The rest area in which Muhammad and Malvo were captured; the blue 1990 Chevrolet Caprice driven by them is at the upper left with its doors open.

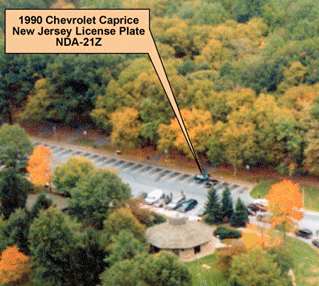
A second aerial view of the rest stop.

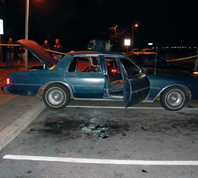
The blue 1990 Chevrolet Caprice driven by Muhammad and Malvo, at the rest area where they were captured. Glass shards on the ground are a result of the shattering of the car's windows during the arrest.

Just after midnight on October 24, 2002, refrigerator mechanic Whitney Donahue called 911 at a rest stop off Interstate 70 near Myersville, Maryland. Donahue said he saw a dark blue 1990 Chevrolet Caprice with New Jersey license plates, which matched the description that law enforcement had said they were looking for.

Trooper First Class D. Wayne Smith of the Maryland State Police was the first to arrive at the scene and immediately used his light blue unmarked police vehicle to block off the exit by positioning the car sideways between two parked tractor-trailers. As more troopers arrived, they effectively sealed off the rest area at both the entrance and exit ramps without the suspects being aware of the rapidly growing police presence. Later, as truck driver Ron Lantz was attempting to exit the rest area, his tractor-trailer was commandeered by troopers who used the truck, in place of the police car, to complete the roadblock at the exit. With the suspects' escape route sealed off, the SWAT officers moved in to arrest them.

At 3:19 a.m., Muhammad and Malvo were found sleeping in their car and were arrested on federal weapons charges.

A stolen Bushmaster .223-caliber weapon and bipod were found in a bag in Muhammad's car. Ballistics tests later conclusively linked the seized rifle to 11 of the 14 shootings, including one in which no one was hurt.

The Chevrolet Caprice was later discovered to have formerly been used as an undercover police car in Bordentown, New Jersey.

== Conclusions of the investigations ==
=== Logistics and tactics ===
Video of ATF agents demonstrating the snipers' usage of their vehicle

The attacks were carried out with a stolen Bushmaster XM-15 semi-automatic .223 caliber rifle equipped with a Bushnell holographic weapon sight effective at ranges of up to 300 meters (1,000 feet), which was found in the vehicle. The trunk of the Chevrolet Caprice was modified to serve as a "rolling sniper's nest". The back seat was modified to allow a person access to the trunk. Once inside, the sniper could lie prone and take shots through a small hole created for that purpose near the license plate.

=== Motive ===
During pre-trial motions, investigators and the prosecution suggested that Muhammad intended to kill his second ex-wife Mildred, who he felt had estranged him from his children. According to this hypothesis, the other shootings were intended to cover up the motive for the crime. Muhammad believed that the police would not focus on an estranged ex-husband as a suspect if Mildred appeared to be a random victim of a serial killer. During the attacks, Muhammad frequented the neighborhood where she lived, and some of the incidents occurred nearby. Additionally, he had earlier made threats against her. Mildred herself said that she was his intended target, claiming that when the police first approached her, one officer said, "Ms. Muhammad, didn't you know you were the target?" However, Judge LeRoy F. Millette Jr. prevented prosecutors from presenting that theory during the trial, saying that a link had not been firmly established.

While he was imprisoned, Malvo wrote a number of erratic diatribes about what he termed his "jihad" against the United States. "I have been accused on my mission. Allah knows I'm gonna suffer now," he wrote. Because his rants and his drawings featured such figures as Osama bin Laden and Saddam Hussein, along with characters from the film series The Matrix, these musings were dismissed as immaterial. Some investigators reportedly said they had all but eliminated terrorist ties or political ideologies as a motive. Nonetheless, in at least one of the ensuing murder trials, a Virginia court found Muhammad guilty of killing "pursuant to the direction or order" of terrorism.

At the 2006 trial of Muhammad, Malvo testified that the aim of the killing spree was to kidnap children for the purpose of extorting money from the government and "set up a camp to train children how to terrorize cities," with the ultimate goal being to "shut things down" across the United States. Malvo also stated that Muhammad was driven by his hatred for white people, and his belief that "the white man is the devil". His plan was to kill six white people per day for thirty days, and he told Malvo he wanted him to shoot pregnant white women.

== Aftermath ==
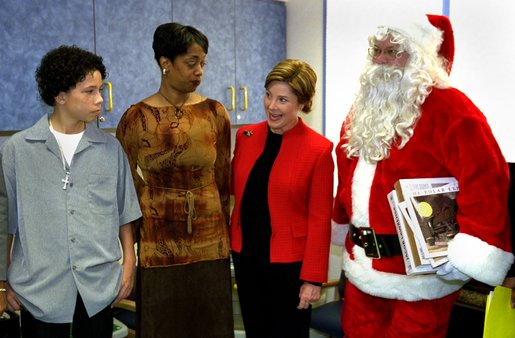
Iran Brown, survivor of the snipers' shooting at Benjamin Tasker Middle School, with First Lady Laura Bush in December 2002.

=== Criminal prosecutions ===
==== Trials in Virginia ====
Before the trial, Chief Moose engaged in a publicity tour for his book on the sniper investigation, including appearances on Dateline NBC, The Today Show, and The Tonight Show. Assistant Prince William County Commonwealth's Attorney James Willett told The Washington Post, "Personally, I don't understand why someone who's been in law enforcement his whole life would potentially damage our case or compromise a jury pool by doing this."

Change of venue requests by defense attorneys were granted, and the first trials were held in the independent cities of Chesapeake and Virginia Beach in southeastern Virginia, more than 100 miles (160 km) from the closest alleged attack (in Ashland, Virginia).

During their trials in the fall of 2003, involving two of the victims in Virginia, Muhammad and Malvo were each found guilty of murder and weapons charges. The jury in Muhammad's case recommended that he be sentenced to death, while Malvo's jury recommended a sentence of life in prison without parole instead of a death sentence. The judges concurred in both cases. Alabama law enforcement authorities allege that the snipers engaged in a series of previously unconnected attacks prior to October 2 in Montgomery, Alabama.

After the initial convictions and sentencing, Will Jarvis, the Assistant Prince William County prosecutor, stated he would wait to decide whether to try Malvo on capital charges in his jurisdiction until the U.S. Supreme Court ruled on whether juveniles may be subject to the penalty of execution. While that decision in an unrelated case was still pending before the high court, in October 2004, under a plea agreement, Malvo pleaded guilty in another case in Spotsylvania County, for another murder to avoid a possible death sentence, and agreed to additional sentencing of life imprisonment without parole. Malvo had yet to face trial in Prince William County.

In March 2005, the Supreme Court ruled in Roper v. Simmons that the Eighth Amendment prohibits execution for crimes committed when under the age of 18. In light of this Supreme Court decision, the prosecutors in Prince William County decided not to pursue the charges against Malvo. Prosecutors in Maryland, Louisiana, and Alabama were still interested in putting both Malvo and Muhammad on trial. As Malvo was 17 when he committed the crimes, he could no longer face the death penalty but still could be extradited to Alabama, Louisiana, and other states for prosecution. At the time of the Roper v. Simmons ruling, Malvo was 20 years old and was held at Virginia's maximum security Red Onion State Prison in Pound, Wise County.

"Muhammad, with his sniper team partner, Malvo, randomly selected innocent victims," Virginia Supreme Court Justice Donald Lemons wrote in the decision. "With calculation, extensive planning, premeditation and ruthless disregard for life, Muhammad carried out his cruel scheme of terror."

Muhammad's death sentence was affirmed by the Virginia Supreme Court on April 22, 2005, when it ruled that he could be sentenced to death since the murder was part of an act of terrorism. This line of reasoning was based on the handwritten note demanding $10 million. The court rejected an argument by defense lawyers that Muhammad could not be sentenced to death because he was not the triggerman in the killings linked to him and Malvo.

==== Execution of Muhammad ====
On September 16, 2009, the circuit court judge Mary Grace O'Brien set an execution date by lethal injection for November 10, 2009. His attorneys petitioned the U.S. Supreme Court to stay his execution, but it was denied. They also requested clemency from Virginia Governor Tim Kaine, but this was denied as well.

Muhammad was executed by lethal injection at the Greensville Correctional Center near Jarratt, Virginia, on November 10, 2009. The execution procedure began at 9:06 p.m. EST; Muhammad was pronounced dead five minutes later. It was reported that when asked if he had any last words, Muhammad made no reply. Twenty-seven people, including victims' family members, witnessed his execution.

==== Trials in Maryland ====
In May 2005, Virginia and Maryland announced that they had reached agreements to allow Maryland to proceed with prosecuting charges there, where the most shootings occurred. There were media reports that Malvo and his legal team were willing to negotiate his cooperation, and he waived extradition to Maryland.

Muhammad and his legal team responded by fighting extradition to Maryland. Muhammad's legal team was ultimately unsuccessful, and extradition was ordered by a Virginia judge in August 2005.

In May 2006, Malvo testified against Muhammad in Muhammad's Maryland criminal trial. Muhammad, who represented himself at trial, cross-examined Malvo. On the witness stand, Malvo accused Muhammad of having taken Malvo into his home and having made him into "'a monster'".

Maryland agreed to transfer Muhammad and Malvo back to the Commonwealth of Virginia after their trials. A date for Muhammad's pending execution in Virginia had been set for November 10, 2009.

Malvo pleaded guilty to six murders and confessed to others in other states while being interviewed in Maryland and testifying against Muhammad. Malvo was sentenced to six consecutive life terms without the possibility of parole, but in 2017, his sentence in Virginia was overturned after an appeal.

On May 30, 2006, a Maryland jury found John Allen Muhammad guilty of six counts of murder in Maryland. In return, he was sentenced to six consecutive life terms without possibility of parole on June 1, 2006.

On May 6, 2008, it was revealed that Muhammad had asked prosecutors in a letter to help him end legal appeals of his conviction and death sentence "so that you can murder this innocent black man." An appeal filed by Muhammad's defense lawyers in April 2008 cited evidence of brain damage that might render Muhammad incompetent to make legal decisions, and that he should not have been allowed to represent himself at his Virginia trial.

==== Malvo's testimony ====
In John Allen Muhammad's May 2006 trial in Montgomery County, Maryland, Lee Boyd Malvo took the stand and confessed to the 17 murders. He also gave a more detailed version of the pair's plans. Malvo, after extensive psychological counseling, admitted that he was lying at the earlier Virginia trial where he had admitted to being the trigger man for every shooting. Malvo claimed that he had said this in order to protect Muhammad from a potential death sentence, and because it was more difficult to obtain the death penalty for a minor. Malvo said that he wanted to do what little he could for the families of the victims by letting the full story be told. In his two days of testimony, Malvo outlined detailed aspects of all the shootings.

Part of his testimony concerned Muhammad's complete multiphase plan. His plan consisted of three phases in the Washington, D.C., and Baltimore metro areas. Phase one consisted of meticulously planning, mapping, and practicing their locations around the D.C. area. This way, after each shooting they would be able to quickly leave the area on a predetermined path and move on to the next location. Muhammad's goal in Phase One was to kill six white people a day for 30 days. Malvo went on to describe how Phase One did not go as planned due to heavy traffic and the lack of a clear shot or getaway at locations.

Phase Two was meant to take place in Baltimore, Maryland. Malvo described how this phase was close to being implemented but was not carried out. Phase Two was intended to begin by killing a pregnant woman by shooting her in the stomach. The next step would have been to shoot and kill a Baltimore police officer. Then, at the officer's funeral, they planned to detonate several improvised explosive devices complete with shrapnel. These explosives were intended to kill a large number of police, since many police would attend another officer's funeral.

The last phase, Phase Three, was to take place during or shortly after Phase Two, which was to extort several million dollars from the United States government. This money would be used to finance a larger plan, to travel north to Canada. Along the way, they would stop in YMCAs and orphanages recruiting other impressionable young black boys with no parents or guidance. Muhammad thought he could act as their father figure as he did with Malvo.

Once he recruited a large number of young black boys and made his way up to Canada, he would begin their training. Malvo described how John Muhammad intended to train boys in weapons and stealth as he had been taught. Finally, after their training was complete, John Allen Muhammad would send them out across the United States to carry out mass shootings in many other cities, just as he had done in Washington and Baltimore. These attacks would be coordinated and be intended to send the country into chaos that had already been built up after 9/11.

=== Civil and regulatory actions ===
According to The Seattle Times in a story which was published on April 20, 2003, Muhammad had honed his marksmanship at Bull's Eye's firing range. The newspaper also reported that Malvo told investigators that he shoplifted the 35-inch-long (89 cm) carbine from the "supposedly secure store."

According to U.S. Bureau of Alcohol, Tobacco, Firearms, and Explosives (ATF) officials, the store and its owners had a long history of firearms sales and records violations and a file 283 pages thick. In July 2003, the ATF revoked the federal firearms license of Brian Borgelt, a former staff sergeant with the U.S. Army Rangers and owner of Bull's Eye Shooter Supply. Later that month he transferred ownership of the store to a friend and continued to own the building and operate the adjacent shooting gallery.

On January 16, 2003, the Legal Action Project of the Brady Center to Prevent Gun Violence, on behalf of the families of many of the victims of the sniper attacks both in and out of the D.C. area who were killed (including Hong Im Ballenger, "Sonny" Buchanan Jr., Linda Franklin, Conrad Johnson, Sarah Ramos, and James L. Premkumar Walekar) as well as two victims who survived the shooting (Rupinder "Benny" Oberoi and 13-year old Iran Brown) filed a civil lawsuit against Bull's Eye Shooter Supply and Bushmaster Firearms, Inc. of Windham, Maine, the gun distributor and manufacturer that made the rifle used in the crime spree, as well as Borgelt, Muhammad, and Malvo. Muhammad, who had a criminal record of domestic battery, and Malvo, a minor, were each legally prohibited from purchasing firearms.

The suit alleged that the dealer could not account for hundreds of guns received from manufacturers in the years immediately prior to the Beltway sniper attacks. It was also claimed that Bull's Eye continued to sell guns in the same irresponsible manner even after Muhammad and Malvo were caught and found to have acquired the weapon there. Bushmaster was included in the suit because it allegedly continued to sell guns to Bull's Eye as a dealer despite an awareness of its record-keeping violations.

The case had been set for trial in April 2005; however, the parties settled it before that date. Bushmaster said that it was settled because of escalating legal fees and because of the dwindling amount of insurance money that was left as a result of the case. Bull's Eye contributed $2 million and Bushmaster contributed $500,000 to an out-of-court settlement. Bushmaster also agreed to educate its dealers about safer business practices.

After the settlement was announced, WTOP radio in Washington, D.C., reported that Sonia Wills, the mother of the victim Conrad Johnson, said her family took part in the lawsuit to send a message rather than collect money. "I think a message was delivered that you should be responsible and accountable for the actions of irresponsible people when you make these guns and put them in their hands," she said.

=== Memorials ===
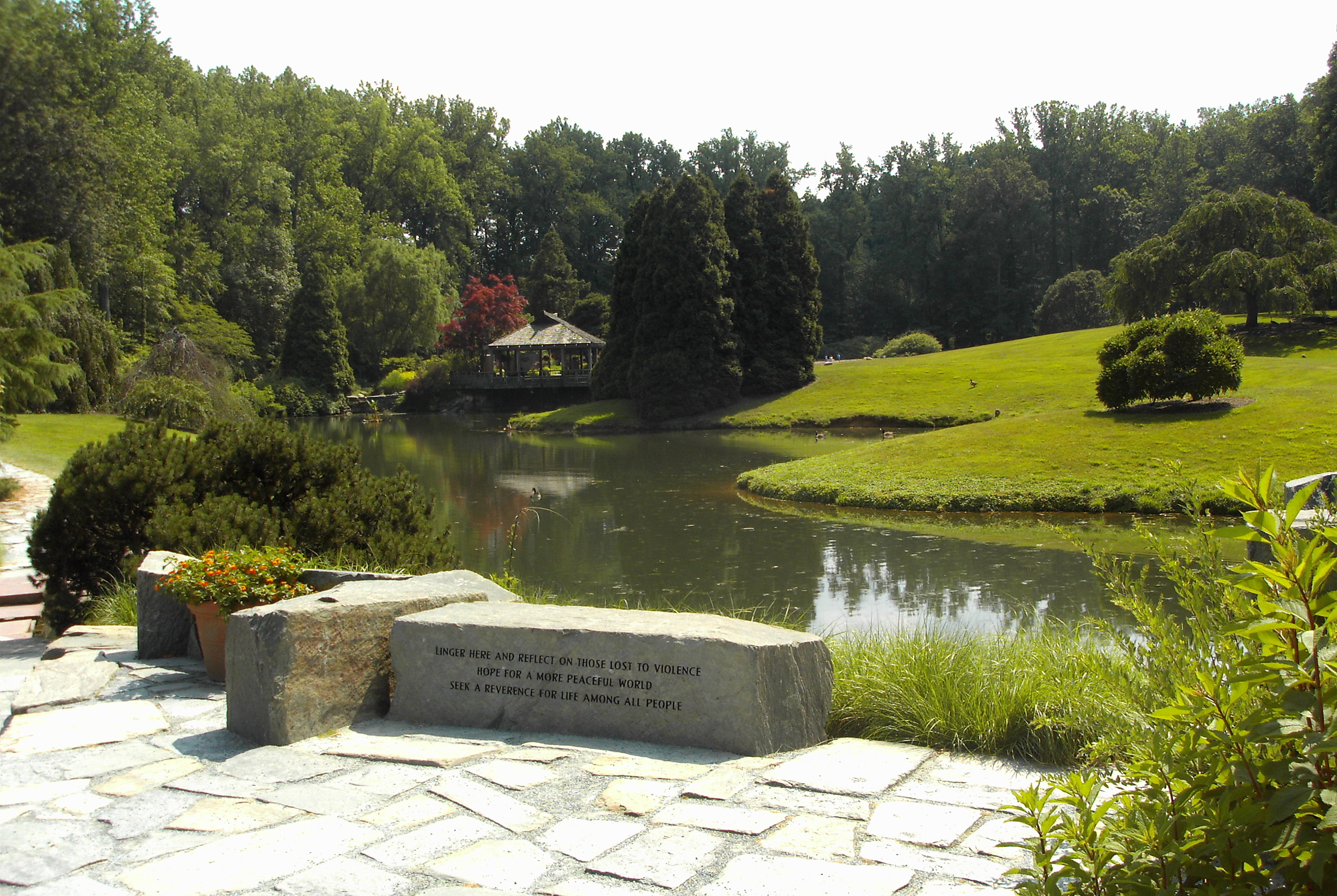
Brookside Gardens' Reflection Terrace was built in the fall of 2004 in memory of the snipers' victims

A memorial to the victims of the D.C. area sniper attacks is located at Brookside Gardens in Wheaton, Maryland. An additional memorial was constructed in 2014 in the government plaza of Rockville, Maryland.

== In popular culture ==
=== Film and television ===
- The broadcast of the CSI: Miami episode "Kill Zone" had to be postponed until November 2002 because the story about a sniper who kills three random victims during rush hour seemed to bear too close a resemblance to the Beltway attacks.
- On July 12, 2003, Forensic Files aired an episode titled "The Sniper's Trail", which documents the D.C. sniper attacks and subsequent police investigation.
- On October 17, 2003, the USA Network's U.S. cable station aired D.C. Sniper: 23 Days of Fear, a television movie based on the D.C. sniper attacks.
- The November 2, 2005 episode of Criminal Minds, "L.D.S.K.", is directly based on these events, including the perpetrator's use of a modified vehicle during the attacks.
- On November 10, 2005, a documentary about the killings titled "The Washington Snipers", an episode of the British documentary series Born to Kill? aired.
- During the fall of 2007, BET broadcast a documentary about the Beltway Snipers as an episode of its American Gangster series.
- In June 2008, the documentary The D.C. Sniper's Wife told the D.C sniper attacks story through the eyes of Mildred Muhammad, the ex-wife of John Allen Muhammad.
- The 2010 film D.C. Sniper, directed by Ulli Lommel, is based on the attacks.
- On August 9, 2010, The Biography Channel aired an episode of Aftermath with William Shatner, titled "DC Sniper Victims" in which the actor William Shatner spoke at length with three survivors of the sniper attacks—Paul LaRuffa, Kellie Adams, and Caroline Seawell.
- On November 7, 2011, episode 66 of Kanıt was aired with the title "Keskin Nişancı (The Sniper)" which tells a story about a sniper and his young accomplice in İstanbul, and it is inspired by the attacks.
- The 2013 film Blue Caprice, also known as The Washington Snipers in some regions, is based on the attacks and the relationship between Muhammad and Malvo.
- On July 22, 2015, the Lifetime Movie Network aired an episode of Monster in My Family which features Mildred Muhammad meeting surviving victims along with family members of the deceased, with Lee Malvo also appearing in the episode while he is in prison.
- On December 2, 2018, the Smithsonian Channel aired an episode of The Lost Tapes, titled DC Sniper
- On February 28, 2023, Paramount+ aired an episode of FBI True, titled "The Beltway Snipers". Season 1 Episode 8.
- On June 23, 2023, Netflix aired an episode of Catching Killers, titled "Trained to Kill: The DC Sniper"

=== Publications ===
- In 2003, former Montgomery County police chief Charles Moose, the primary official in charge of the Beltway sniper attacks, published a book titled Three Weeks in October: The Manhunt for the Serial Sniper.
- In 2020 (January 6 – March 23), the podcast You're Wrong About produced a four-part series of podcasts about the attacks, chronicling the connection between John Allen Muhammad and Lee Boyd Malvo as well as their lives as individuals.
- In 2020, iHeartRadio and Tenderfoot TV covered the attacks in the third season of their true crime podcast Monster.

== See also ==
- 2003 West Virginia sniper attacks
- 2003 Ohio highway sniper attacks
- 2013 Metcalf sniper attack
- 2015 Phoenix freeway shootings
- Eulalio Tordil shootings (2016)
- Edmund Burke School shooting (2022)
