= J. Thomas Manger =

American police officer

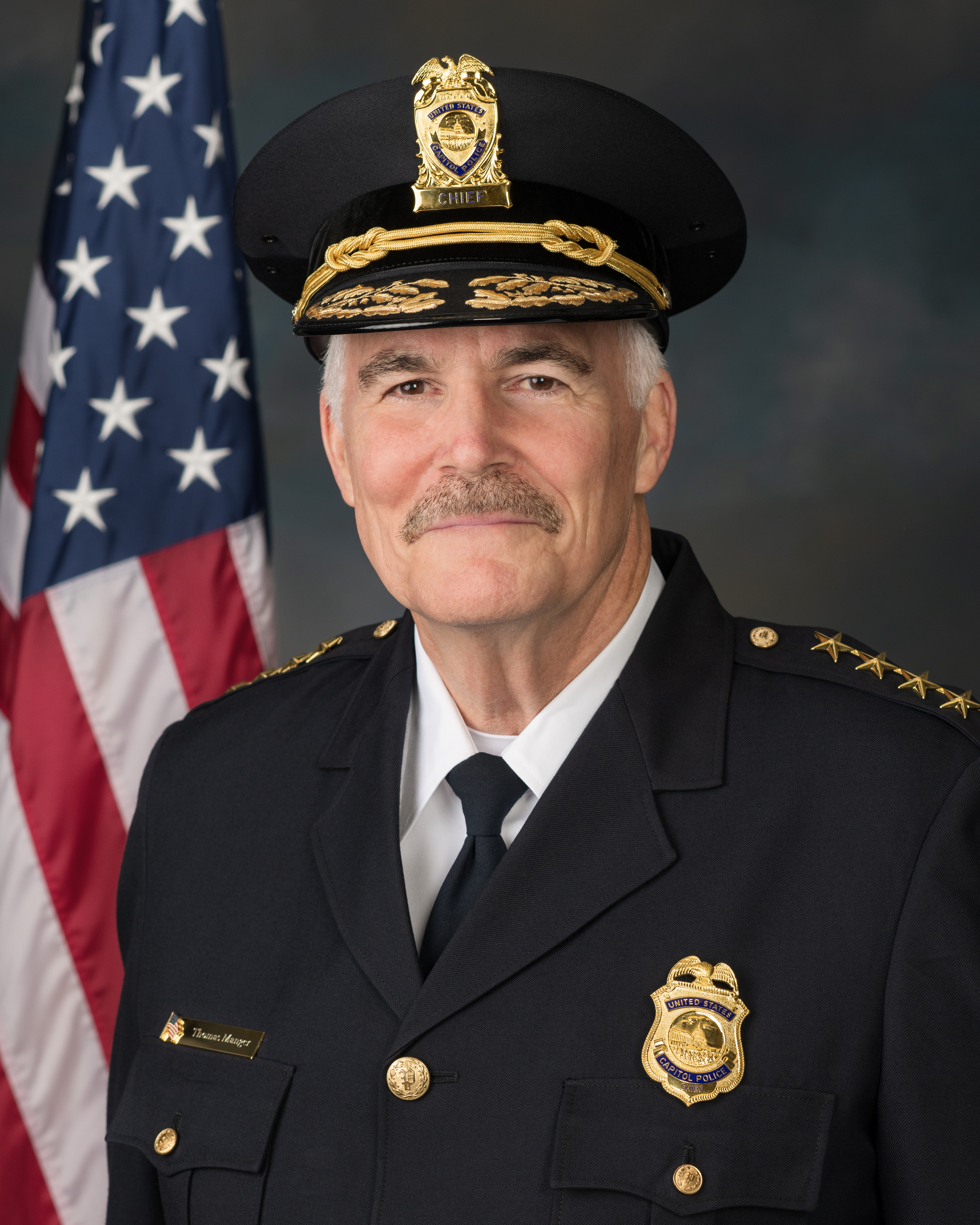

11th Chief of the United States Capitol Police
- In office July 23, 2021 – May 2, 2025
- Preceded by: Steven Sund
- Succeeded by: Sean Gallagher (acting); Michael G. Sullivan

Chief of the Montgomery County Police Department
- In office 2004–2019
- Preceded by: William C. O'Toole
- Succeeded by: Marcus Jones

Chief of the Fairfax County Police Department
- In office 1998–2004
- Preceded by: M. Douglas Scott
- Succeeded by: David M. Rohrer

Personal details
- Born: John Thomas Manger; 1954 or 1955 (age 71–72) Baltimore, Maryland, U.S.
- Children: 2
- Education: University of Maryland, College Park (BS)

John Thomas Manger is an American former police officer who served as the 11th chief of the United States Capitol Police until his retirement in 2025. He previously served as the chief of the Montgomery County Police Department. Manger was selected to lead the Capitol Police in the aftermath of the January 6 United States Capitol attack. He served in that role for nearly four years, retiring on May 2, 2025.

== Early life and education ==
Manger was born in Baltimore in 1954 or 1955 and is named after both his father and grandfather. When he was 14, his family moved from Baltimore City to Silver Spring, Maryland. Manger has three siblings.

Manger graduated from the University of Maryland, College Park in 1976 with a Bachelor of Science degree in criminal justice. He is also a graduate of the FBI National Academy.

== Career ==
Manger started his career in law enforcement in January 1977 as an officer with the Fairfax County Police Department. From 1998 to 2004, Manger served as chief of the department.

In 2004 Manger took over as chief of police in Montgomery County, Maryland. He retired from the post in 2019.

Manger took over as chief of the United States Capitol Police on July 23, 2021, replacing Acting Chief Yogananda Pittman. On March 11, 2025, Manger announced his retirement effective May 2.

Shortly after retiring, it was announced that Manger would join the consulting 21CP Solutions as a senior advisor.

== Personal life ==
Manger is married and has two children.

== Awards and honors ==
- 1993 Silver Medal of Valor from Fairfax County, Virginia
- 2007 Law Enforcement Award from the Brady Campaign to Prevent Gun Violence
- 2012 inducted into the Montgomery county Human Rights Hall of Fame
- 2016 Gorowitz Institute Service Award from the Anti-Defamation League
- 2017 Keeper of the Dream award from the National Immigration Forum
- 2018 FBI National Executive Institute Associates Penrith Award
- 2018 recognised as one of the Washingtonians of the Year by Washingtonian magazine
