= Lee Boyd Malvo =

American spree killer (born 1985)

- Born: February 18, 1985 (age 41); Kingston, Jamaica
- Status: Incarcerated
- Convictions: Virginia; Capital murder (3 counts) (Note: 2 for 1 victim); Attempted murder Use of a firearm in the commission of a felony (3 counts); Maryland; First degree murder (6 counts)
- Penalty: Life imprisonment (eligible for parole in Virginia; pending resentencing in Maryland)

Details
- Date apprehended: October 24, 2002

Lee Boyd Malvo (born February 18, 1985), also known as John Lee Malvo, is a Jamaican convicted mass murderer who, along with John Allen Muhammad, committed a series of murders dubbed the D.C. sniper attacks over a three-week period in October 2002.

Malvo and Muhammad killed 10 people and critically wounded three others in the D.C. sniper attacks. The D.C. sniper attacks, which terrorized the Washington, D.C. area, were masterminded by Muhammad. Malvo was aged 17 when he and Muhammad committed the sniper attacks. The two were arrested while sleeping in a vehicle at a rest stop near Frederick, Maryland, on October 24, 2002. On December 18, 2003, a Virginia jury convicted Malvo of capital murder charges in connection to the killing of Linda Franklin. He was sentenced to life in prison without parole. In October 2004, Malvo entered an Alford plea to charges of murder and attempted murder in Virginia and pleaded guilty to two firearms charges; he was sentenced to life in prison without parole for murder and was sentenced to eight years in prison on the weapons charges. In May 2006, Malvo testified against Muhammad at a trial in Maryland. On October 10, 2006, Malvo pleaded guilty to six murders he committed in Maryland. On November 8, 2006, he was sentenced in Maryland to six consecutive life sentences without possibility of parole. Malvo has acknowledged that he and Muhammad committed other shootings prior to the D.C. sniper attacks.

Malvo is serving multiple life sentences at Keen Mountain Correctional Center in Virginia.

== Early life ==
Lee Boyd Malvo was born on February 18, 1985, to Leslie Malvo, a mason, and Una James, a seamstress. The couple, who never married, lived in Kingston, Jamaica. Una left Leslie in 1990, when Lee Malvo was five years old. Una and Lee moved to the hill town of Endeavour, Jamaica, to be with her sister Marie Lawrence for almost a year.

They moved back to Kingston, and later to St. Martin. When Malvo was nine years old he was sent to live with his aunt Marie, where he stayed for almost a year. On passing his sixth grade exams, Lee was sent to York Castle High School.

Malvo has stated that he suffered sexual abuse during his childhood.

Jamaican pastor Lorenzo King baptized Malvo into the Seventh-day Adventist Church at 14 years of age in 1999. Malvo later moved to Antigua in 1999 to be with his mother. He registered at Antigua and Barbuda Seventh-day Adventist School, where he got good grades and also won a school award in the 100 meter run.

== Criminal history ==
=== Relationship with John Allen Muhammad ===
Malvo and his mother, Una Sceon James, first met John Allen Muhammad in Antigua and Barbuda around 1999, where she and Muhammad developed a strong friendship. Later, Una left Antigua for Fort Myers, Florida, using false documents. She left her son with Muhammad, reportedly planning to have him follow her later. Malvo was converted to Islam by Muhammad in March 2001. Muhammad also isolated Malvo from his mother.

Malvo arrived illegally in Miami in 2001, and in December of that year, he and his mother were apprehended by the Border Patrol in Bellingham, Washington. In January 2002, Malvo was released on a $1,500 bond. Malvo subsequently lived in a homeless shelter with Muhammad in Bellingham. Malvo enrolled in Bellingham High School with Muhammad falsely listed as his father. He did not make any friends, according to his classmates.

While in the Tacoma, Washington, area, according to his statements to investigators, Malvo shoplifted a Bushmaster XM-15 from Bull's Eye Shooter Supply and practiced his marksmanship on the Bull's Eye firing range adjacent to the gun shop. Under federal laws, neither Muhammad nor Malvo were legally allowed to purchase or possess guns, with both classified as prohibited persons under the Gun Control Act of 1968. Muhammad trained Malvo to kill.

In an interview with Matt Lauer on October 24, 2012, Malvo said that Muhammad had sexually abused him over a period of years.

=== D.C. sniper attacks and other shootings ===
Malvo and Muhammad killed 10 people and critically wounded three others in the October 2002 D.C. sniper attacks. The attacks "terrorized the Southeast and the nation's capital". Muhammad was the mastermind behind the attacks.

Years later, Malvo told authorities that he and Muhammad were guilty of four additional shootings that occurred prior to the D.C. sniper attacks. Specifically, Malvo stated that he and Muhammad had shot and killed a man in Los Angeles, California during a robbery in February or March 2002; had non-fatally shot a 76-year-old man on May 18 at a golf course in Clearwater, Florida; had shot and killed a man who was doing yard work in Denton, Texas on May 27; and had non-fatally shot 54 year-old John Gaeta on August 1 during a robbery outside a shopping mall near Baton Rouge, Louisiana. Malvo also told police that he and Muhammad had killed Jerry Taylor, 60, as Taylor practiced chip shots at a Tucson, Arizona, golf course in March 2002. Tucson detectives interviewed Malvo about Taylor, who died from a single gunshot fired at long range; they did not disclose their findings.

=== Arrest, prosecutions, and convictions ===
Malvo and Muhammad were arrested while sleeping in a vehicle at a rest stop near Frederick, Maryland on October 24, 2002.

Malvo was initially arrested under federal charges, but they were dropped. He was transferred to Virginia custody and sent to jail in Fairfax County. He was charged by the Commonwealth of Virginia for two capital crimes: the murder of FBI analyst Linda Franklin "in the commission of an act of terrorism" (the phrase being added to Virginia law after the September 11 attacks) and the murder of more than one person in a three-year period. Malvo was also charged with the unlawful use of a firearm in the murder of Franklin. Initially, a Fairfax attorney, Michael Arif, was appointed to represent him, along with Thomas B. Walsh and Mark J. Petrovich. Later, prominent Richmond attorney Craig Cooley was appointed to the team and assumed a leadership role. Due to extensive pre-trial publicity around the entire Washington metropolitan area, the trial was moved more than 150 miles to Chesapeake, Virginia. Malvo pleaded not guilty by reason of insanity to all charges on the grounds that he was under Muhammad's complete control. One of Malvo's psychiatric witnesses testified that Muhammad, a member of Nation of Islam, had indoctrinated Malvo into believing that the proceeds of an extortion attempt would be used to begin a new nation of only pure black young persons somewhere in Canada.

During the trial, Cooley said that violent video games had contributed significantly to Malvo's state of mind and his willingness to commit murder. Cooley said, "He's trained and desensitized with video games, computer games, to train him to shoot human forms over and over." Sociologists Lawrence Kutner and Cheryl K. Olson, however, argue in their book Grand Theft Childhood that other factors were much more significant. "In court, Lee Malvo admitted that he trained by shooting a real gun at paper plates that represented human heads. Also, Malvo had a long history of antisocial and criminal behavior, including torturing small animals, one of the best predictors of future violent criminal behavior."

On December 18, 2003, after nearly 14 hours of deliberation, a Virginia jury convicted Malvo of both capital murder charges in connection to the killing of Linda Franklin. On December 23, the jury recommended a sentence of life in prison without the possibility of parole. On March 10, 2004, Malvo was sentenced to life in prison without parole.

On October 26, 2004, under a plea bargain to avoid a possible death penalty, Malvo entered an Alford plea to the charges of murdering Kenneth Bridges and attempting to murder Caroline Seawell while Malvo was in Spotsylvania County, Virginia. He also pleaded guilty to two firearms charges and agreed not to appeal his conviction for the murder of Franklin. He was sentenced to life in prison without parole for murder, plus eight years imprisonment for the weapons charges.

In May 2005, Virginia and Maryland reached an agreement to allow Maryland to begin prosecuting some of the pending charges there, and Malvo was extradited to Montgomery County, Maryland, under heavy security.

In May 2006, Malvo testified against Muhammad in Muhammad's Maryland criminal trial. Muhammad, who represented himself at trial, cross-examined Malvo. On the witness stand, Malvo accused Muhammad of having taken Malvo into his home and having made him into "'a monster'". Malvo, after extensive counseling, admitted that he had been lying in the statement he made after his arrest when he admitted to being the triggerman for every shooting. Malvo claimed that he had said this to protect Muhammad from the death penalty because it would have been more difficult (and since declared unconstitutional) to impose the death penalty for murders committed by a minor. Malvo stated, "I'm not proud of myself. I'm just trying to make amends", expressing his regret in the shootings. In his two days of testimony, Malvo outlined detailed aspects of all the shootings. Part of Malvo's testimony concerned Muhammad's complete plan, which consisted of three phases in the Washington, D.C. and Baltimore metro areas. Phase One consisted of meticulously planning, mapping and practicing their locations around the D.C. area so that after each shooting they could quickly leave the area on a predetermined path and move to the next location. Muhammad's goal in Phase One was to kill six white people a day for 30 days. Malvo went on to describe how Phase One did not go as planned due to heavy traffic and the lack of a clear shot and/or getaway at different locations. Phase Two was meant to take place in Baltimore. Malvo described how this phase was close to being implemented but was never carried out. Phase Two was intended to begin by killing a pregnant woman by shooting her in the abdomen. The next step would have been to shoot and kill a Baltimore police officer. At the officer's funeral, they would plant several improvised explosive devices. These explosives were intended to kill a large number of police since many police would attend another officer's funeral. More bombs were then to be detonated as ambulances arrived at the scene. Phase Three was to take place immediately after Phase Two; it involved extorting several million dollars from the U.S. government. This money would be used to finance a larger plan to travel north into Canada and recruit other effectively orphaned boys to use weapons and stealth and send them out to commit shootings across the country.

On October 10, 2006, Malvo pleaded guilty to the six murders he was charged with in Maryland.

On November 8, 2006, Malvo was sentenced to six consecutive life sentences without possibility of parole.

=== Post-sentencing developments ===
Malvo was incarcerated at the Red Onion State Prison as Virginia Department of Corrections inmate 1180834. Malvo was relocated to Keen Mountain Correctional Center in September 2024.

- On October 2, 2007, Malvo called Cheryll Witz, a daughter of one of the victims to apologize for his actions.
- Muhammad was executed by lethal injection on November 10, 2009.
- Malvo sent a letter, dated February 21, 2010, to apologize to John C. Gaeta for shooting him. Malvo wrote: "I am truly sorry for the pain I caused you and your loved ones. I was relieved to hear that you suffered no paralyzing injuries and that you are alive."
- A Wise County, Virginia, Circuit Judge denied Malvo's request to change his name on July 29, 2011. Malvo petitioned the court for the name change on the basis that he would be safer if his fellow inmates did not know his real name, due to his notoriety.
- In September 2012, Malvo gave a lengthy interview to The Washington Post. In this interview, Malvo, then 27, stated that "I was a monster. If you look up the definition, that's what a monster is. I was a ghoul. I was a thief. I stole people's lives. I did someone else's bidding just because they said so. There is no rhyme or reason or sense."
- On May 26, 2017, a federal district court judge in Virginia overturned Malvo's sentences of life without parole on the grounds that it was unconstitutional under Miller v. Alabama because Malvo was 17 years old at the time of the killings. However, on August 16, 2017, Montgomery County, Maryland Circuit Court Judge Robert Greenberg decided that the Virginia federal court ruling did not apply to the Maryland cases since the sentences were not mandatory in the state of Maryland. Greenberg wrote, "The six consecutive life-without-parole sentences were imposed after a full consideration of Defendant's physical, mental, and emotional state". He went on to state that the judge who imposed the original sentence "considered all relevant factors at play and the plain import of his words at the time was that Defendant is 'irreparably corrupted.'"
- On June 21, 2018, the United States Court of Appeals for the Fourth Circuit unanimously upheld a lower court's decision that Malvo's sentences of life without parole were unconstitutional. Judge Paul V. Niemeyer wrote in the decision that "Malvo was 17 years old when he committed the murders, and he now has the retroactive benefit of new constitutional rules that treat juveniles differently for sentencing." A spokesperson for Virginia Attorney General Mark Herring stated the office is considering asking for a full 4th Circuit rehearing, or appealing to the Supreme Court of the United States to hear the case.
- On June 29, 2018, Virginia Attorney General Mark Herring said in a statement that his office was seeking to have the Supreme Court of the United States review the case. On March 18, 2019, the Supreme Court granted certiorari, and heard the case on October 16, 2019.
- On February 24, 2020, Malvo asked the Supreme Court to dismiss his appeal as moot, after a change in Virginia state law that made him eligible for parole in that state. The law change made any person sentenced to life as a juvenile and who has served 20 years in prison eligible to be considered for early release. Malvo became eligible for parole consideration in Virginia in 2022. His life sentences in Maryland are not affected, but he is now trying to appeal those sentences as well.
- On March 10, 2020, Malvo's adviser Carmeta Albarus announced Malvo was married in a ceremony held at Red Onion State Prison.
- In April 2021, Maryland banned life sentences for juveniles, Malvo sued for relief and the Maryland Court of Appeals agreed to review. Oral arguments began in February 2022.
- On August 26, 2022, the Maryland Court of Appeals ordered a resentencing for Malvo in order to comply with the Supreme Court.
- On August 30, 2022, Malvo was denied parole by the Virginia parole board.
- On March 13, 2024, Maryland judge considered how and when the transfer of Malvo for new sentence takes place.

== Portrayals ==
- Malvo is portrayed by Trent Cameron in the 2003 TV film D.C. Sniper: 23 Days of Fear.
- Malvo is portrayed by Tory N. Thompson in the 2010 film D.C. Sniper.
- Malvo is portrayed by Tequan Richmond in the 2013 film Blue Caprice.
- Malvo is portrayed in the 2020 TV series I, Sniper.

== See also ==
- List of rampage killers in the United States
- List of serial killers in the United States
- List of serial killers by number of victims

== Bibliography ==
- Profile: Lee Boyd Malvo, BBC News
- Malvo Found Guilty in Washington Sniper Case, Reuters (via Yahoo! News)
- Article about Malvo's indoctrination Expert Witness Describes Making of a Serial Killer
- The Education of Lee Boyd Malvo, Bidoun
