= D.C. Sniper: 23 Days of Fear =

- USA Network promotional image for the D.C. Sniper: 23 Days of Fear T.V. movie based on the sniper attacks
- Written by: Dave Erickson
- Directed by: Tom McLoughlin
- Starring: Charles S. Dutton; Jay O. Sanders; Bobby Hosea; Helen Shaver
- Music by: Mark Snow
- Country of origin: United States
- Original language: English

Production
- Producers: Orly Adelson; Jonathan Eskenas; Tracey Jeffrey
- Cinematography: Mark Wareham
- Editor: Charles Bornstein
- Running time: 85 minutes
- Production companies: Orly Adelson Productions; USA Cable Entertainment

Original release
- Network: USA Network
- Release: October 17, 2003

D.C. Sniper: 23 Days of Fear (also known as Sniper: 23 Days of Fear in Washington D.C.) is a 2003 TV movie created by USA Network based on the Beltway sniper attacks of 2002.

The films chronicles the period when John Allen Muhammad (played by Bobby Hosea) and Lee Boyd Malvo (played by Trent Cameron) went on a serial killing spree in October 2002 in Virginia, Washington, D.C., and Maryland, all parts of the Washington Metropolitan Area, the entire area of which was held in a "grip of terror."

== Plot ==
In October 2002, Chief Charles Moose of the Montgomery County Police Department, heads an effort to track down those responsible for a recent string of murders in Montgomery County, Maryland.

Unable to give anything but small pieces of information at various press conferences held during the 23 dark days, Moose finds himself vilified and derided in many corners as ineffectual and incompetent. Indeed, quite a few newspapers outside the area targeted by snipers came right out and called for Moose's resignation. But the chief's dogged persistence ultimately paid off and — in the sort of twist that a professional writer of thrillers might dismiss as inconceivable — the two men arrested for the carnage turned out to be the archetypal "least likely suspects."

== Cast ==
- Charles S. Dutton as Chief Charles Moose
- Jay O. Sanders as Douglas Duncan
- Bobby Hosea as John Allen Muhammad
- Trent Cameron as John Lee Malvo
- Helen Shaver as Sandy Moose
- Tom O'Brien as Lieutenant Jacobs
- Charlayne Woodard as Mildred Muhammad
- Garwin Sanford as FBI Agent Tremain
- Doug Abrams as FBI Agent Stone
- Michael Kopsa as Detective Foster
- David Neale as Detective Paulson
- Veena Sood as Sylvia Mack
- Nels Lennarson as Gordon Wolf
- Michael Adamthwaite as George Lenahan
- Sean Allen as Father Sullivan
- Gillian Barber as Audrey Duncan
- Bianca Blake as Taiba Muhammad
- Artine Brown as Jacobs
- Linda Darlow as Joan Abernathy
- Shai-Anne Davis as Sulena Muhammad
- Andrew Francis as Jeffrey Duncan
- Anthony Lively as Jack Duncan
- Alexandria Michell as Melanie Duncan
- Claire Riley as Beatrice Jaffe
- Lucas Sherry as John Muhammad Jr.
- George W. Bush as Himself (archive footage)

== Release ==
D.C. Sniper: 23 Days of Fear originally aired on the USA Network on October 17, 2003, just as John Allen Muhammad and John Lee Malvo's murder trials were getting underway.
