= 82nd Sustainment Brigade =

82nd Airborne Division Sustainment Brigade
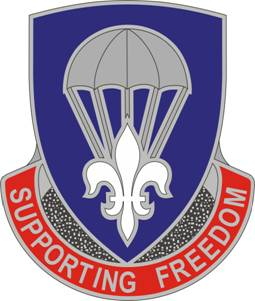
- Distinctive unit insignia
- Active: 16 March 2006–present
- Country: United States
- Branch: United States Army
- Type: Sustainment brigade
- Role: Sustainment
- Size: Brigade
- Part of: 82nd Airborne Division
- Garrison/HQ: Fort Bragg, North Carolina
- Motto: Supporting Freedom
- Engagements: Operation Desert Storm; Operation Iraqi Freedom; Operation Enduring Freedom-Afghanistan

Commanders
- Current Commander: COL Jonathan Gregory
- Current Command Sergeant Major: CSM Carla R. Williams-Stancil

Insignia
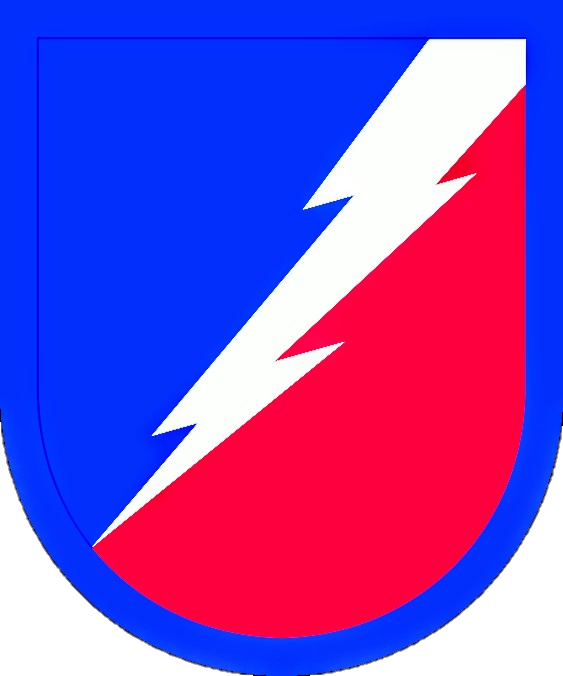
- Brigade beret flash

- 82nd Airborne Division Shoulder Sleeve Insignia worn by the sustainment brigade's paratroopers

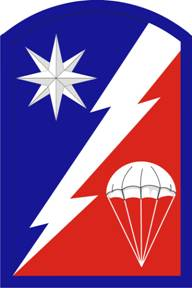
- Former 82nd Division Support Command Shoulder Sleeve Insignia

The 82nd Airborne Division Sustainment Brigade is a sustainment brigade of the United States Army based at Fort Bragg, North Carolina. It provides logistical support to and is part of 82nd Airborne Division.

Formed out of the Division Support Command of the 82nd Airborne Division, the brigade has a long history of supporting the 82nd Airborne Division in numerous contingencies throughout the world. The sustainment brigade supported the division in operations including Operation Just Cause, Operation Urgent Fury, Operation Power Pack and Operation Desert Storm. Recently, the brigade has seen multiple deployments in support of Operation Iraqi Freedom. The brigade's mission in support of Operation Enduring Freedom-Afghanistan came to an end when responsibility was handed to the 101st Sustainment Brigade during a ceremony at Bagram Airbase on 2 December 2010. For the first time since the Global War on Terror began in 2001, with the exception of Delta Detachment, 82nd Finance, all the elements of the 82nd Sustainment Brigade were home in Fort Bragg. Since then, the 82nd Sustainment Brigade has once again been called upon to assist in OEF Afghanistan by establishing and controlling CENTCOM Materiel Recovery Element (CMRE) operations. On 21 May 2015, the brigade realigned back under the 82nd Airborne Division and became the 82nd Airborne Division Sustainment Brigade.

== Organization ==
The 82nd Airborne Division Sustainment Brigade is composed of a special troops battalion, a financial management support unit, and a combat sustainment support battalion:

- Headquarters and Headquarters Company
- 82nd Special Troops Battalion
- 189th Division Sustainment Support Battalion
- 82nd Brigade Support Battalion
- 307th Brigade Support Battalion
- 407th Brigade Support Battalion

== History ==
=== Origins ===
The 82nd Sustainment Brigade traces its lineage to the 82nd Support Group, which was constituted 1 September 1957 at Fort Bragg. It was composed of units with long histories with the 82nd Airborne Division, dating back to World War I and World War II.

On 25 May 1964 the unit reorganized as the 82nd Division Support Command, or DISCOM. It was merged with the 82nd Airborne Division's band. A year later, the unit deployed to the Dominican Republic with the 82nd Airborne Division in support of Operation Power Pack. The Division was charged with the mission of quelling civil unrest and restoring order to the country, and the DISCOM provided logistical support during this mission. In 1972, the band was removed from the Division Support Command.

In 1983, the unit again deployed to combat, this time to Grenada in support of Operation Urgent Fury. It provided logistical support to the 82nd Airborne Division as the division deployed in the island, supporting US Special Forces operating within. Then in 1989, the unit supported the first combat jump since World War II while supporting Operation Just Cause in Panama. It provided logistical efforts to the division once again in the region.

Ground operations during Operation Desert Storm, with the 82nd Airborne Division positioned at the left flank

In August 1990, during Operation Desert Shield, paratroopers from the unit protected the XVIII Airborne Corps' left flank during the subsequent Operation Desert Storm. It then advanced on the western flank of the invasion force along with the 82nd Airborne Division, 101st Airborne Division, and other units of the XVIII Airborne Corps, striking some of the deepest incursions into Iraq of the war. The Division eventually advanced to Tallil while the majority of the attacking force moved into Kuwait. The formation earned its first campaign streamers for this action.

The unit returned to combat again in 2003 during the invasion of Iraq, Operation Iraqi Freedom I. The 101st Airborne Division and the 3rd Infantry Divisions made the main attacks into Iraq, while elements of the 82nd Airborne Division supported them. The initial push was a rapid success, but the insurgency that followed saw convoys become a primary target for Iraqi insurgents. For the first time, these service and support paratroopers found themselves on the front lines, as supply convoys became the central target of resistance fighters.

Hurricane Katrina in 2005 provided a unique and unexpected mission for the paratroopers of the unit, as they were deployed to provide assistance to the citizens of Louisiana. The supporting units were deployed to New Orleans International Airport along with the division's 3rd Brigade and division Artillery units, a force of some 5,000 soldiers. They conducted security operations and search and rescue missions throughout New Orleans, Louisiana.

=== Activation ===
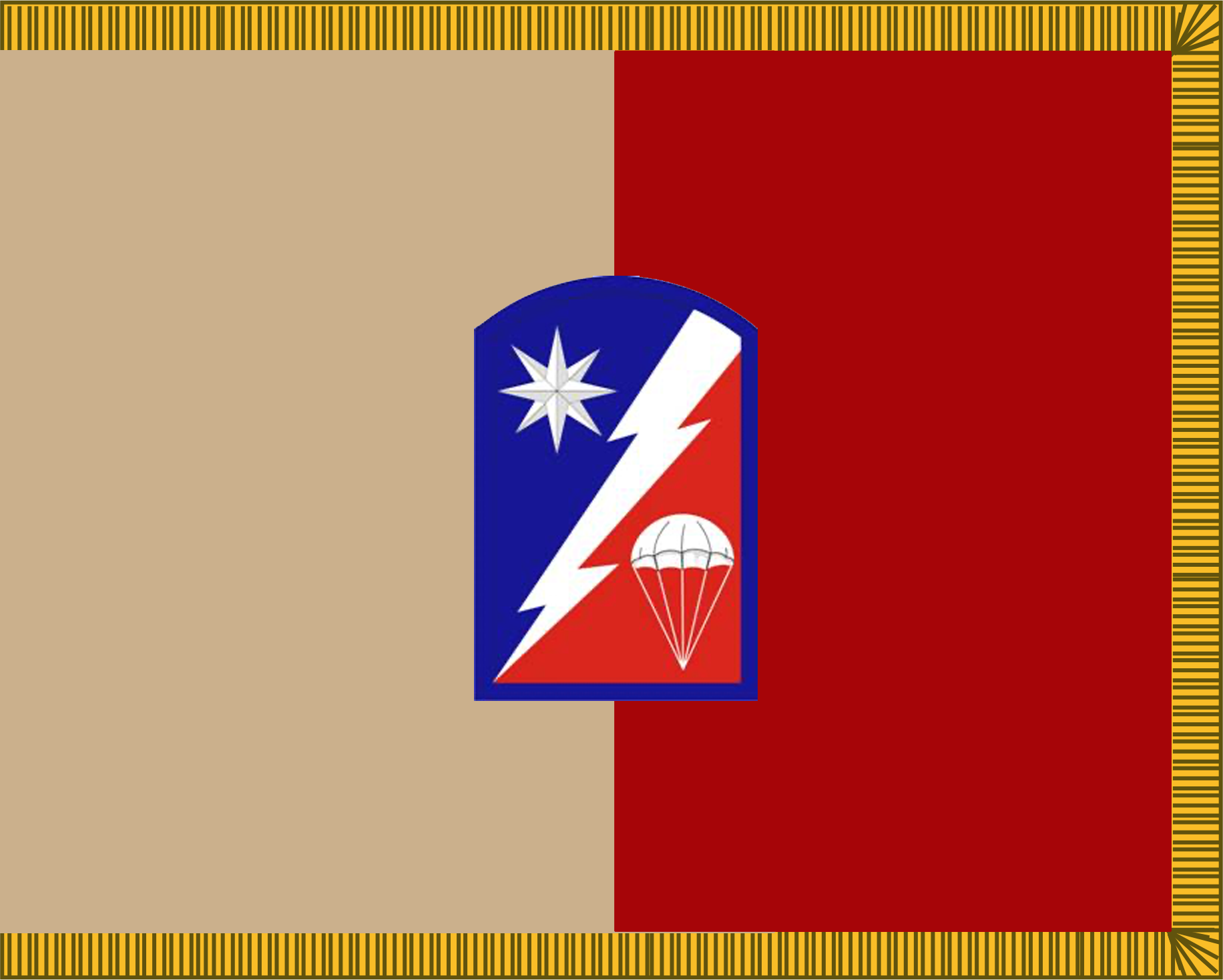
82nd Sustainment Brigade Flag

On 16 February 2006 the unit reorganized as the 82d Sustainment Brigade under the Army's modular transformation redesign. As a part of this redesign, the brigade was removed from the command of the 82d Airborne Division and made a separate, independent unit. It would continue to support the 82d Airborne Division, but it would be able to take on different missions when deployed. Instead, its mission is to support all US Army Forces Command (FORSCOM) units stationed at Fort Bragg while generating sustainment capabilities to meet rotational demand and respond to future contingencies.

In August 2006, the newly reorganized unit deployed to Iraq in support of Operation Iraqi Freedom VI. On 26 September 2006, it uncased its colors at Tallil Airbase in Iraq, to provide support services for coalition forces and Iraqi security forces in southern Iraq. They took this responsibility from the 16th Sustainment Brigade, which was rotating out of the theater. Throughout the deployment and into 2007, the brigade's medical staff was rotated into hospitals in Baghdad, Iraq for thirty day tours for each unit. The medical staff, including many of the brigade's field medics, treated American forces injured in fighting around Baghdad. In August 2007, the brigade participated in a large coalition athletic competition hosted by the US Air Force's 407th Air Expeditionary Group at Ali Air Base, Iraq. The brigade took second place in the competition, in which it competed in various sports against other US military units as well as Australian and Romanian forces.

During its deployment to Iraq, the brigade undertook many responsibilities, including providing logistics for airdrops and major combat operations including Operation Marne Torch. The brigade also created a Combat Logistics Patrol academy, training for combat situations during convoy operations, including improvised explosive device detection and removal, and first aid. The brigade also dispatched optometry teams to soldiers in the region to ensure they had all the eyesight testing they needed. The brigade returned to the continental United States in early 2008 along with the rest of the 82d Airborne Division, and was recognized by President George W. Bush in a welcome home speech.

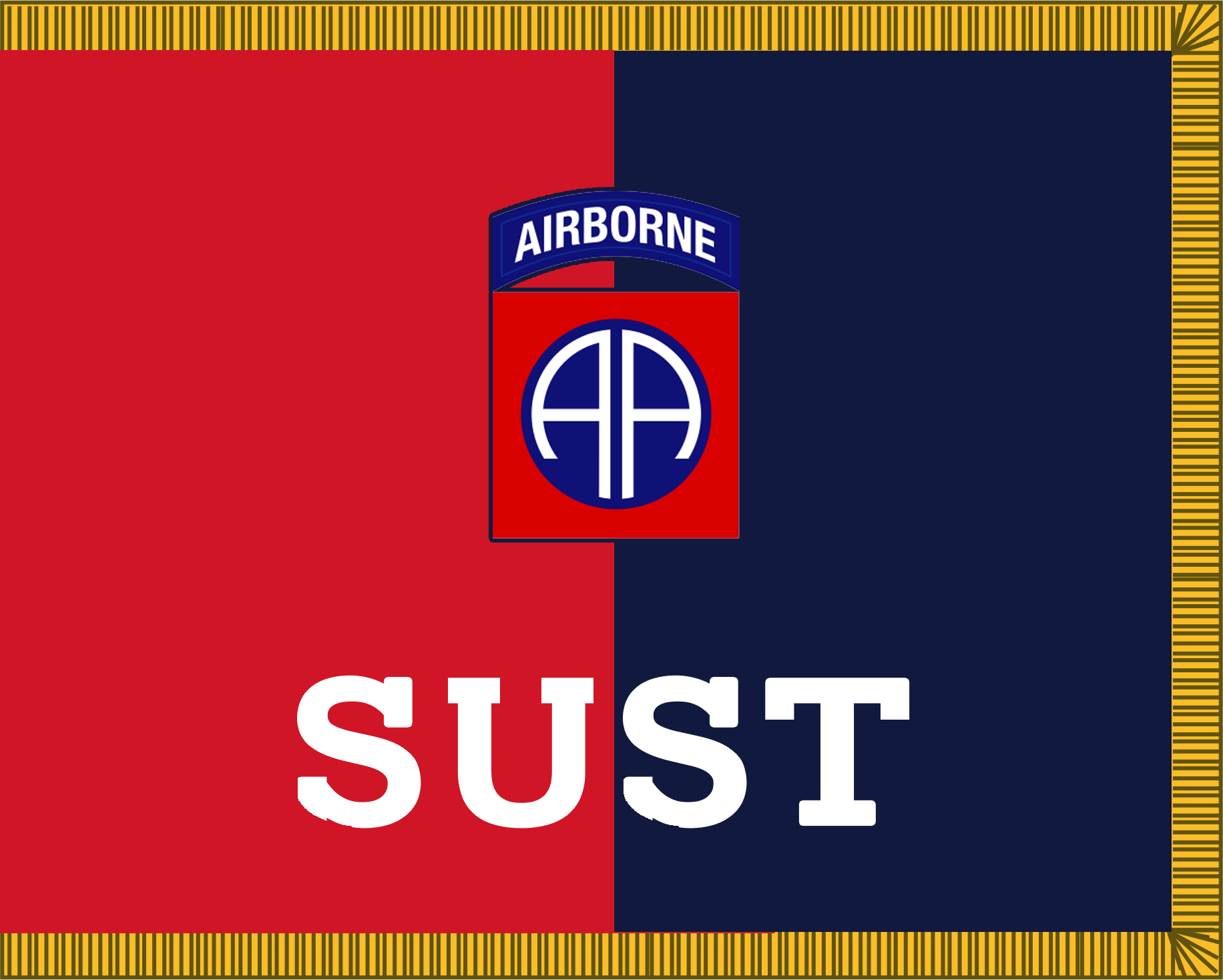
82nd Division Sustainment Brigade Flag

The brigade received its shoulder sleeve insignia on 19 March 2007 and its distinctive unit insignia on 8 November 2007. The insignia alludes heavily to the unit's history with the 82d Airborne Division. In 2015 the brigade ceased being a separate unit and became part of the 82d Airborne Division. As a division unit, its personnel adopted the division's shoulder sleeve insignia and the maroon beret with a brigade-specific flash; however, most of the brigade's personnel are not on jump status and only wear the maroon beret and shoulder sleeve insignia because these are unit uniform items.

On 29 February 2008 the 82d Sustainment Brigade added the 264th Combat Sustainment Support Battalion as a subordinate unit. The 264th has a long history of supporting the United States Army in a myriad of campaigns dating back to World War II. On 16 December 2007 the brigade was detached from the 82d Airborne Division and attached to the XVIII Airborne Corps as a separate brigade. One month later, the 507th Support Group (Corps), XVIII Airborne Corps, was inactivated and three of its battalions were reassigned to the 82d Sustainment Brigade. This addition gave the brigade a total of five battalions, making it the largest brigade on Fort Bragg, and one of the largest in the United States Army.

New building facilities for the 82d Sustainment Brigade have been completed. Two new barracks built specifically for the unit are now occupied by the Soldier who spent the past 12 months at Bagram Army Airfield.

== Honors ==
=== Unit decorations ===
Ribbon	Award	Year	Notes
	Superior Unit Award	1994	

=== Campaign streamers ===
Conflict	Streamer	Year(s)
Gulf War	Defense of Saudi Arabia	1990–1991
Gulf War	Liberation and Defense of Kuwait	1990–1991
Iraq War	Operation Iraqi Freedom I	2003–2004
Iraq War	Operation Iraqi Freedom IV	2006–2007
Afghanistan War	Operation Enduring Freedom IX	2009–2011
Afghanistan War	Operation Enduring Freedom XIII	2013–2014
