= 555th Engineer Brigade (United States) =

- 555th Engineer Brigade Shoulder Sleeve Insignia
- Active: 2007-23 October 2026
- Country: United States
- Branch: United States Army
- Type: Brigade
- Role: Engineer Brigade
- Part of: I Corps
- Nicknames: "The Triple Nickel" and "Willing and Able"

Commanders
- Current commander: Colonel Ada Cotto

Insignia
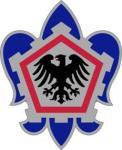
- Distinctive unit insignia

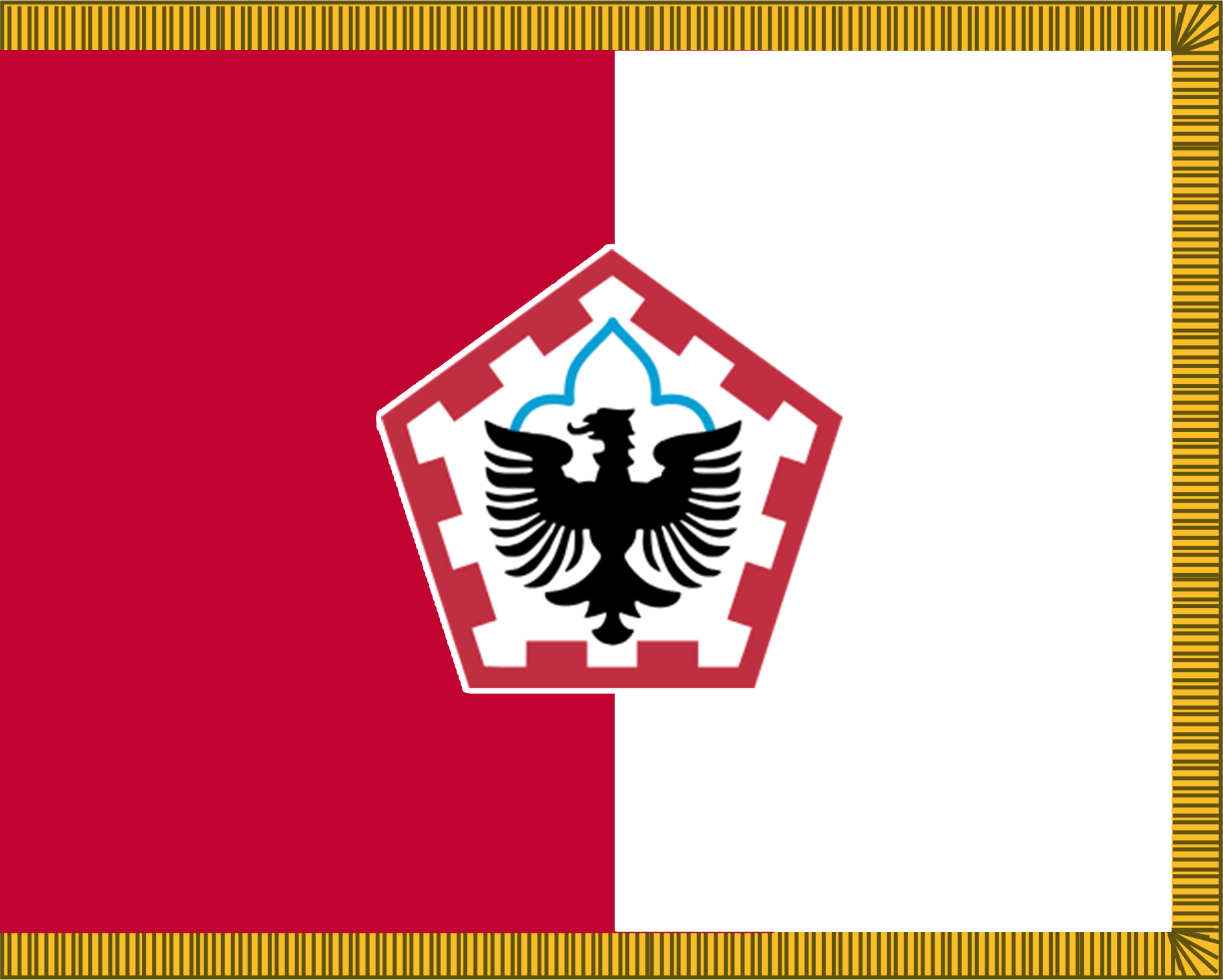
- 555th Engineer Brigade Flag

The 555th Engineer Brigade "Triple Nickel" was a combat engineer brigade of the United States Army based at Joint Base Lewis-McChord, Washington. The brigade was a Corps separate falling directly under I Corps. The 555 numbering was first used in 1947, but the brigade traces its history to a group active under the 1103d designation from 1943 to 1946. On 23 October 2026, the brigade was inactivated.

== History ==
=== Activation through World War II (February 1943 to May 1946) ===
Headquarter and Headquarters Company, 1103rd Engineer Combat Group was constituted on February 1st, 1943, and formally activated on the 25th of February, 1943 at Ft. Devens, Massachusetts, where they trained until deploying to participate in Operation Neptune.

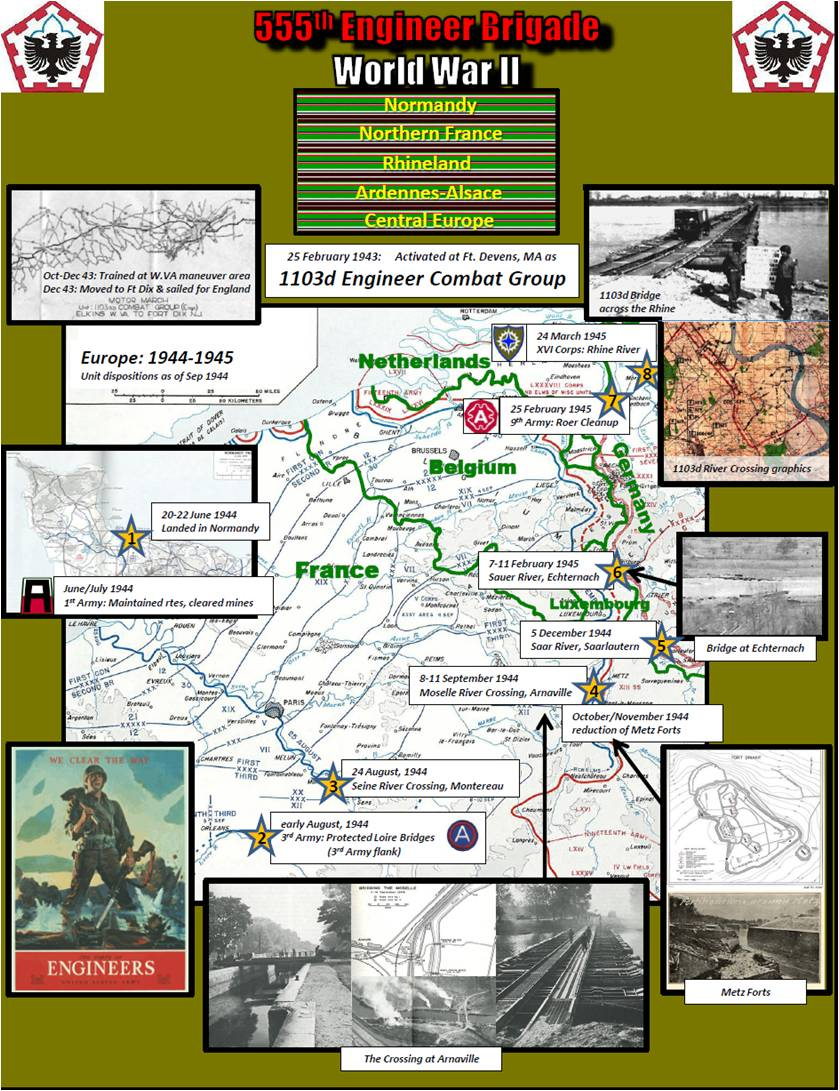
555 EN BDE HQ, 1103d WW2 highlights.

Assigned to the U.S. First Army, the 1103d crossed the English Channel during the period of 20 to 22 June 1944. The 1103d earned its first of five campaign streamers during the Normandy Invasion, clearing and maintaining supply routes at Omaha and Utah Beach.

In August 1944, the 1103d was transferred to General George S. Patton's Third Army. Throughout the fall of 1944, the 1103d protected captured bridges on the Loire River, bridged the Moselle River, and breached the massive and cubicled Metz forts for the assaulting forces. During these engagements, the 1103d earned two additional campaign streamers for the Northern France and Ardennes-Alsace Campaigns.

In February 1945, the 1103rd supported the Ninth Army in the Ruhr cleanup on the northern sector. Here they earned a fourth streamer in support of the Rhineland Campaign. The unit then proceeded across the Rhineland with XVIII Airborne Corps for the remainder of the war, earning a fifth campaign streamer in support of the Central European Campaign.

The 1103d Engineer Combat Group was inactivated 8 May 1946 and reactivated 20 January 1947 at Rüsselsheim, Germany. On 5 March 1947, it was redesignated as Headquarters and Headquarters Detachment, 555th Composite Service Group. On 7 March 1949, it was further redesignated as Headquarters and Headquarters Detachment, 555th Engineer Combat Group and allotted to the Regular Army on 16 February 1951.

Subunits of the 1103d during this period included 150th Engineer Combat Battalion, 160th Engineer Combat Battalion, 204th Engineer Combat Battalion, 206th Engineer Combat Battalion, 551st Engineer Heavy Pontoon Battalion, 989th Engineer Treadway Bridge Company, 537th Engineer Light Pontoon Company and 623d Engineer Light Equipment Company.

The 1103d was inactivated on 8 May 1946 in Germany.

=== Post World War II in Germany (January 1947 to June 1969) ===
Between 1947 and 1969, the unit served at Rüsselsheim, Kaufbeuren, Ettlingen, and Karlsruhe, Germany as it contributed to the defense of western Europe during the Cold War. During this period it was reorganized and redesignated multiple times.

On 20 January 1947, the 1103d was activated again at Russelheim, Germany. On 5 March 1947, the 1103d was redesignated as Headquarters and Headquarters Detachment, 555th Composite Service Group. Two years later, on 7 March 1949, it was redesignated and reorganized as Headquarters and Headquarters Company, 555th Engineer Combat Group.

On 9 August 1950 the Group moved from Russelheim to Kaufbeuren, and seven months later to Rhineland Kaserne in Ettlingen. In October 1952, the unit deployed to Phillips Barracks, Karlsruhe.

On 1 April 1953, the 555th Engineer Combat Group was reorganized and redesignated as Headquarters and Headquarters Company, 555th Engineer Group (Combat).

While in Europe, the 555th was responsible for providing engineer support to 7th Army, including obstacle construction, route maintenance, and tactical bridging. One of their most important missions while in Germany was maintaining and operating prefabricated Class 60 float bridges along the Rhine River that were known as "swing bridges". The prefabricated bridges consisted of two pre-assembled spans, one on each shore of the river, that could be "swung" across the river and connected in less than 15 minutes if required. The bridges were usually left open to allow commercial river traffic to travel unimpeded along the Rhine.

On 11 August 1955, two C-119 Flying Boxcars with 56 Soldiers from the 499th Engineer Battalion, 555th Engineer Group collided in midair over the Black Forest near the village of Edelweiler, Germany. All personnel on both planes were killed, to include the 499th Engineer Battalion Commander. At the time, it was the U.S. Army's worst post-war disaster in Europe.

Principal units assigned to the 555th during this time period consisted of the 499th Combat Engineer Battalion (Combat), 78th Engineer Combat Battalion, the 55th Engineer Company (Panel Bridge), the 502nd Engineer Company (Pontoon Bridge), the 809th Engineer Company (Panel Bridge), the 11th Labor Service District Headquarters, the 6961st Civilian Labor Group, and the 44th Finance Dispensation Section.

On 17 January 1967, the unit moved one more time, to Smiley Barracks in Karlsruhe. Finally, on 25 June 1969, the 555th was inactivated. Personnel and equipment from the group joined with the 540th Engineer Group to form the 7th Engineer Brigade (VII Corps).

=== Activation at Fort Lewis, Washington to Operation Iraqi Freedom (January 1992 to April 2003) ===
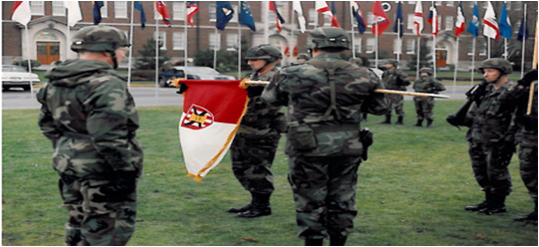
Furling the 7th EN BDE colors at Fort Lewis, 18 January 1992.

The 555th Combat Engineer Group was reactivated at Fort Lewis, Washington on 16 January 1992. The group began forming in August 1991 with a nucleus of soldiers from the inactivating 15th Combat Engineer Battalion, 9th Infantry Division (Motorized). The arrival of the 7th Engineer Brigade soldiers and equipment in October and December 1991 completed the group organization. The 864th Engineer Battalion (Combat Heavy) and the 73rd Engineer Company (Assault Ribbon Bridge) were the first units assigned to the Group on 16 November 1991. The 87th Engineer Detachment (Fire Fighters) and the 54th Engineer Detachment (Topographic) were assigned on 16 January 1992. The 14th Engineer Battalion (Corps) (Wheeled) moved from Fort Ord, CA to Fort Lewis upon closure of Fort Ord and joined the group on 16 October 1993.

The unit conducted rigorous training at Fort Lewis during the decade following its activation in Washington. Other notable missions included short-notice deployments to Yakima Training Center and Idaho to fight fires, training at the Joint Readiness Training Center and National Training Center, and support to training evaluations of Army reserve units.

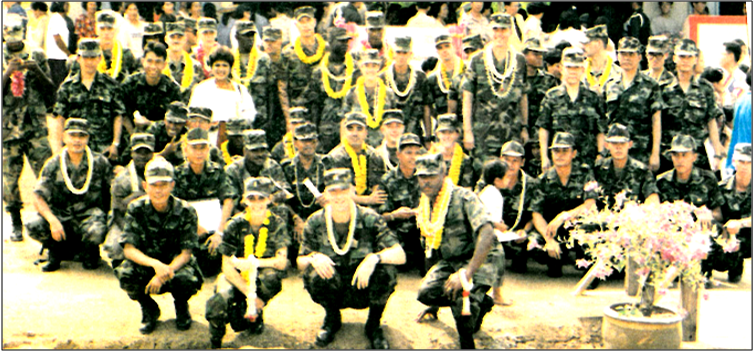
Operation Cobra Gold, Thailand 1995.

Brigade units also deployed numerous times in support of construction missions throughout this period. The missions included deployments to Thailand (Exercise Cobra Gold), Texas (Joint Task Force 6), Haiti, and Alaska. The 555th also participated in numerous construction projects in and around Fort Lewis, Washington. These projects included road repair and upgrades, culvert installation, and construction of bridges and demolition bunkers.

In the mid-1990s, the 555th partnered with the Engineer Research and Development Center (ERDC) in Vicksburg, Mississippi. They tested gear and equipment that was being created for desert and field environments, including Hesco bastions and Sand Grids.

=== Operation Iraqi Freedom (April 2003 to September 2009) ===
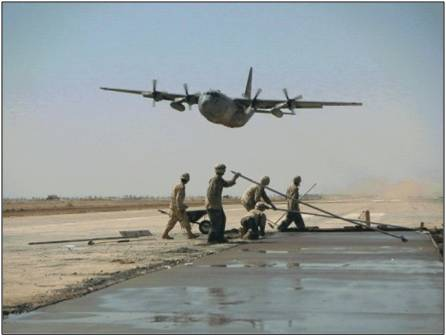
864th EN BN Soldiers repair landing strip in Sunni Triangle, Iraq circa 2003.

In January 2003, the 555th Engineer Group received orders to deploy with the 4th Infantry Division (Mechanized) as a member of Task Force Ironhorse to the CENTCOM Area of Responsibility. From April 2003 to March 2004, the 555th deployed in support of Operation Iraqi Freedom Phase I (Liberation of Iraq) and Phase II (Transition of Iraq). Arriving in country on 11 April 2003, the group was immediately diverted to the seaport in Kuwait where they conducted reception, staging, onward movement, and integration activities in Camp New Jersey, Kuwait. Moving into Iraq in late April, the Group established its headquarters at Forward Operating Base Speicher, in Tikrit, Iraq. There the Group provided assured mobility, force protection and sustainment engineer operations to all brigades in Task Force Ironhorse.

During the deployment, the group served as the headquarters of Task Force Able, which consisted of the Group Headquarters, the 5th Combat Engineer Battalion (Corps) (Mechanized), the 14th Combat Engineer Battalion, the 223rd Engineer Battalion (Combat) (Heavy), the 244th Engineer Battalion (Combat) (Heavy), the 565th Combat Engineer Battalion (Provisional), the 229th Construction Support Equipment Company, the 285th Construction Support Equipment Company, and the 463rd Firefighting Detachment.

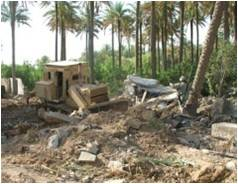
14th EN BN Soldiers pushing through rubble for items of intelligence value, Iraq circa 2006.

Upon returning from deployment, the 555th Engineer Group was provisionally redesignated by U.S. Army Forces Command (FORSCOM) as the 555th Combat Support Brigade (Maneuver Enhancement) [CSB (ME)] at Fort Lewis, Washington on 4 October 2004. Another provisional FORSCOM designation used temporarily from 2004–2007 was the "555th Maneuver Enhancement Brigade", but the unit was better known as a CSB (ME).

From October 2005 through September 2006, the 555th CSB (ME) deployed again in support of Operation Iraqi Freedom Phase III (Iraqi Governance) and Phase IV (National Resolution). As the Divisional Engineer Brigade attached to the 101st Airborne Division (Air Assault) in Multinational Division North (MND-N), the unit was headquartered at Tikrit, Iraq. The MND-N area of operation included most of northern Iraq from just north of Taji to the Turkish Border. The major units attached to the 555th during this deployment were the 14th Combat Engineer Battalion (CEB) and the 505th Engineer Combat Battalion (Heavy) (North Carolina Army National Guard). The 557th Expeditionary RED HORSE (USAF) was under the brigade's Tactical Control (TACON). The principal missions of the 555th were construction, assured mobility (route clearance), coalition munitions clearance, and Iraqi Army Engineer partnership.

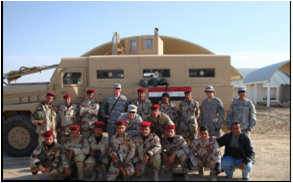
555th EN BDE Soldiers conduct assured mobility partnered with Iraqis, Iraq circa 2008.

Route clearance was primarily the mission of the 14th CEB, which conducted patrols around the clock throughout MND-N searching for improvised explosive devices (IEDs) on the major routes. The 555th also conducted route sanitation and crater repair missions to eliminate the areas in which IEDs could be hidden.

Construction was the primary mission for both the 505th ECB and 557th RED HORSE. The 505th built up several operating bases to house the emerging Iraqi Army. The 557th focused mainly on construction for growing Forward Operating Bases (FOBs) to house coalition forces in the future. The 14th CEB's three support platoons led the way in several combined construction partnerships with the Iraqi Army (IA) engineers, building FOBs, entry control points, and upgrading several existing structures.

Nine months after returning from its second tour in Iraq, on 16 June 2007, the 555th CSB (ME) was reorganized and redesignated as Headquarters and Headquarters Company, 555th Engineer Brigade at Fort Lewis, Washington.

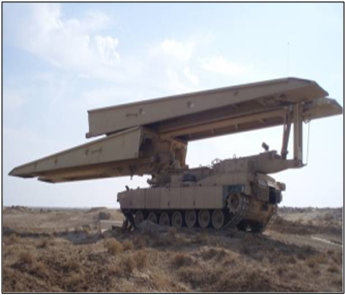
555th EN BDE Soldiers conduct bridge mission, Iraq circa 2008.

From September 2008 through September 2009, the 555th Engineer Brigade deployed for its third tour to Iraq. They participated in Operation Iraqi Freedom Phase V (Iraqi Surge) and Phase VI (Iraqi Sovereignty) as the Multi-National Corps-Iraq Theater Engineer Brigade. Operating out of Joint Base Balad, the brigade initially supported the XVIII Airborne Corps, and later I Corps. They orchestrated full spectrum engineer operations for over 3000 Army, Air Force and Navy Engineers. In partnership with Iraqi Army Engineers, the unit maintained assured mobility, conducted tactical construction, increased Iraqi Army capabilities, and enhanced civil capacity development in support of coalition forces and Provincial Reconstruction Teams (PRTs). Three multifunctional Army engineer battalions (the 5th, 14th, and 54th), the 557th RED HORSE, the 266th MP Co. from Virginia and numerous Air Force and Navy Engineer Detachments rounded out the Triple Nickel Team.

In September 2009, the 555th Engineer Brigade returned to Fort Lewis (now Joint Base Lewis-McChord) to reset and prepare for future operations in support of the global war on terror.

International Security Assistance Force, Afghanistan: Theater Engineer Brigade (2013)

In January 2013, the brigade headquarters deployed to Afghanistan as "Joint Task Force (JTF) Triple Nickel" to assume command of the U.S. Theater Engineer Brigade in support of the International Security Assistance Force. The 555th Engineer Brigade became the lead element in a 5,000-strong joint team composed of U.S. Army, Navy, and Air Force engineer units, including elements of the Regular Army, National Guard, and Reserves.

JTF Triple Nickel's mission during the deployment had three primary focus areas:

First and foremost, the brigade was focused on training and certifying the new Afghan National Army (ANA) engineer force. In accordance with the transition to Afghan-led security and governance, JTF Triple Nickel worked to develop independent, effective, sustainable Afghan engineer units that can support security and development needs throughout the country. These units included dozens of ANA route clearance and construction companies, most of which began operating independently. The brigade helped ANA forces in fielding several Corps Engineer Kandaks, which are units trained and equipped to conduct larger-scale construction, including horizontal projects (such as building and maintaining roads) and vertical projects (such as building, expanding, or hardening military facilities). The 555th also supported plans for a national-level engineer unit, the Afghan National Engineer Brigade (NEB).

JTF Triple Nickel's second focus area was construction and deconstruction on coalition bases, especially for base closures and transfers related to the drawdown of coalition forces. During the brigade's deployment, the 555th oversaw some 240 projects worth over $40 million.

The brigade's third focus area was route clearance. The 555th oversaw dozens of route clearance units patrol daily along key roadways to find and eliminate improvised explosive devices emplaced by insurgents. These patrols, intended to protect coalition and Afghan forces and the civilian population, found and removed over 300 IEDs during the deployment.

In 2014-15, the 1st Engineer Battalion was shifted out of the brigade and into the 1st Armored Division. The 14th Eng Bn was converted to 14th Brigade Engineer Battalion (BEB) as part of 2nd Stryker Brigade Combat Team, 2nd Infantry Division.

== Lineage and honors ==
Headquarters and Headquarters Company, 555th Engineer Brigade

- Constituted 1 February 1943 in the Army of the United States Army as Headquarters and Headquarters Company, 1103d Engineer Combat Group
- Activated 25 February 1943 at Fort Devens, Massachusetts
- Inactivated 8 May 1946 in Germany
- Activated 20 January 1947 in Germany
- Redesignated 5 March 1947 as Headquarters and Headquarters Company, 555th Engineer Combat Group
- Allotted 16 February 1951 to the Regular Army
- Reorganized and redesignated 1 April 1953 as Headquarters and Headquarters Company, 555th Engineer Group
- Inactivated 25 January 1969 in Germany
- Activated 18 January 1992 at Fort Lewis, Washington
- Reorganized and redesignated 16 June 2007 as Headquarters and Headquarters Company, 555th Engineer Brigade

== Organization ==
NATO Map Symbol

555

The unit is composed of:

- Headquarters & Headquarters Company
- 864th Engineer Battalion, (Joint Base Lewis-McChord)

Under Administrative Control (-) at Joint Base Lewis-McChord:

- ADCON (-) of portion of 3D Ordnance Battalion (Explosive Ordnance Disposal [EOD]), operational control: 71st Ordnance Group (EOD)
- 110th Chemical Battalion, operational control: 48th Chemical Brigade

== Unit Awards ==
Ribbon	Award	Year	Notes
	Meritorious Unit Commendation (Army)	2003–2004	Iraq 2003–2004
	Meritorious Unit Commendation (Army)	2005–2006	Iraq 2005–2006
	Meritorious Unit Commendation (Army)	2008–2009	Iraq 2008–2009
	Meritorious Unit Commendation (Army)	2012–2013	Afghanistan 2012–2013

== Campaign participation credit ==
Conflict	Streamer
World War II	Normandy
World War II	Northern France
World War II	Ardennes-Alsace
World War II	Rhineland
World War II	Central Europe
Operation Iraqi Freedom	Liberation of Iraq
Operation Iraqi Freedom	Transition of Iraq
Operation Iraqi Freedom	Iraqi Governance
Operation Iraqi Freedom	National Resolution
Operation Iraqi Freedom	Iraqi Surge
Operation Iraqi Freedom	Iraqi Sovereignty
Operation Enduring Freedom (2013)	International Security Assistance Force
