= John Allen Muhammad =

American spree killer (1960–2009)

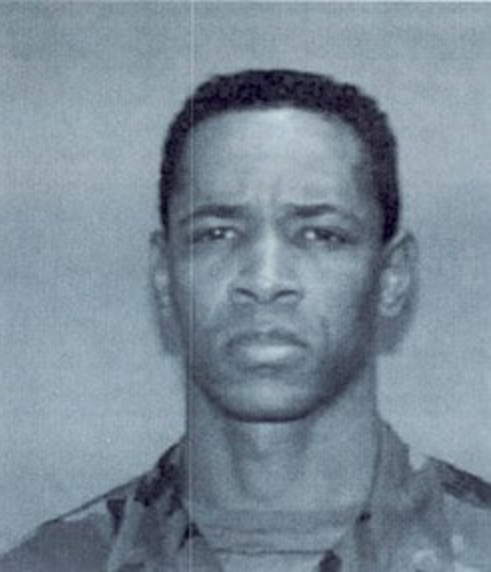
- Muhammad in military attire c. 1986–1994
- Born: John Allen Williams; December 31, 1960; Baton Rouge, Louisiana, U.S.
- Died: November 10, 2009 (aged 48); Greensville Correctional Center, Virginia, U.S.
- Other names: The Beltway Sniper; The D.C. Sniper
- Spouse: Mildred Muhammad (m. 1988; div. 1999)
- Children: 3
- Status: Executed by lethal injection
- Convictions: Maryland; First degree murder (6 counts); Virginia; Capital murder Conspiracy to commit murder Use of a firearm in the commission of a felony
- Penalty: Maryland; Life imprisonment without parole Virginia; Death

Details
- Victims: 10 killed, 3 injured (D.C. metropolitan area); 7 killed, 7 injured elsewhere
- Span of crimes: February 16, 2002 – October 23, 2002
- Country: United States
- States: Alabama, Arizona, California, Florida, Georgia, Louisiana, Maryland, Texas, Virginia, Washington state, and Washington, D.C.
- Date apprehended: October 24, 2002
- Military career
- Allegiance: United States
- Branch: Louisiana Army National Guard (1978–1985); United States Army (1985–1994)
- Service years: 1978–1994
- Rank: Sergeant
- Units: 15th Engineer Battalion, 9th Infantry Division; 13th Engineer Battalion, 7th Infantry Division; 14th Engineer Battalion, 2nd Infantry Division
- War: Gulf War
- Awards: Achievement Medal; Southwest Asia Service Medal; Kuwait Liberation Medal (Saudi Arabia, Kuwait)

John Allen Muhammad (né Williams; December 31, 1960 – November 10, 2009) was an American spree killer and former U.S. Army sergeant. He and his accomplice, Lee Boyd Malvo, carried out a series of shootings across ten states between February through September 2002, killing seven people. They later moved their attacks to the Washington metropolitan area, where they conducted the D.C. sniper shootings, which resulted in the deaths of ten more victims before their arrest.

A native of Baton Rouge, Louisiana, Muhammad changed his surname after joining the Nation of Islam in 1987. At Muhammad's trial, the prosecution claimed that the attacks were part of a plot to kill his ex-wife and regain custody of his children, but the judge ruled that there was insufficient evidence to support this argument.

Muhammad's trial for one of the murders (of Dean Harold Meyers in Prince William County, Virginia) began in October 2003, and ended with his conviction for capital murder. Four months later, he was sentenced to death. While awaiting execution in Virginia, in August 2005, Muhammad was extradited to Maryland for trial, resulting in his conviction on six counts of first-degree murder in May 2006. Upon completion of the trial in Maryland, he was returned to Virginia pending an agreement with another state or the District of Columbia seeking to try him. He was not tried on additional charges in other Virginia jurisdictions and faced potential trials in three other states and the District of Columbia involving other murders and attempted murders. All appeals of his conviction for killing Meyers had been rejected. Appeals for Muhammad's other trials remained pending at the time of his execution.

Muhammad was executed by lethal injection on November 10, 2009, at the Greensville Correctional Center near Jarratt, Virginia. He declined to make a final statement.

== Early life ==
John Allen Muhammad was born John Allen Williams in Baton Rouge, Louisiana, to Ernest and Eva Williams. John and his family moved to New Orleans when his mother was diagnosed with breast cancer; she died when he was three years old. His father left the family soon afterward, leaving John to be raised mainly by his maternal grandfather and an aunt.

In 1987, at the age of 26, Williams joined the Nation of Islam, and subsequently helped provide security for the "Million Man March" in 1995. Nation of Islam leader Louis Farrakhan has publicly distanced himself and his organization from the D.C. sniper attacks.

In 1999, Williams kidnapped his children and took them to Antigua, apparently engaging in credit card and immigration document fraud. It was during this time that he became close with Lee Boyd Malvo, a Jamaican child who later acted as his partner in the killings.

Williams changed his name to John Allen Muhammad in October 2001. After his arrest, authorities also claimed that Muhammad admitted that he admired and modeled himself after Osama bin Laden and al-Qaeda and approved of the September 11 attacks. Malvo testified that Muhammad had indoctrinated him into believing that the proceeds of an extortion attempt would be used to establish "a camp in Canada where homeless children would be trained as terrorists."

Muhammad was twice divorced; his second ex-wife, Mildred Muhammad, sought and was granted a restraining order, alleging abuse. Muhammad was arrested on federal charges of violating the restraining order by possessing a weapon. Under federal law, those with restraining orders are prohibited from purchasing or possessing guns, as per the Lautenberg Amendment to the Gun Control Act of 1968.

Defense attorneys in the Malvo trial and prosecutors in Muhammad's trial argued that the ultimate goal of the Beltway sniper murders was to kill Mildred in order to regain custody of his three children.

== Military service ==
In August 1978, Muhammad enlisted in the Louisiana Army National Guard at Baton Rouge as a combat engineer. He transferred to the Regular Army on November 6, 1985, and was trained as a mechanic, truck driver and specialist metalworker. He qualified with the Army's standard rifle, the M16, earning the Expert Rifleman's Badge. This is the Army's highest of three levels of basic rifle marksmanship for a soldier.

Muhammad's first tour was with the 15th Engineer Battalion at Fort Lewis in 1985. In 1991, he served in the Gulf War with a company that dismantled Iraqi chemical warfare rockets, service for which he received the Southwest Asia Service Medal, the Kuwait Liberation Medal (Saudi Arabia) and the Kuwait Liberation Medal (Kuwait). In 1992, he was at Fort Ord, California, with the 13th Engineers and in 1993 was back at Fort Lewis with the 14th Engineer Battalion.

Muhammad was honorably discharged from the Army with the rank of sergeant on April 26, 1994, after 16 years of service. He received the following awards: Army Service Ribbon, National Defense Service Medal, Overseas Ribbon, Noncommissioned Officers Professional Development Ribbon and Army Achievement Medal.

== D.C. sniper attacks ==
Police followed a lead in which Muhammad or Malvo left a note at one of the shootings to tell the police to investigate a liquor store robbery-murder that had occurred in Montgomery, Alabama. Investigators responding to that crime scene found one of the suspects had dropped a magazine with his fingerprints on it; these were subsequently identified as belonging to Malvo, whose prints were on file with the INS and who was known to associate with Muhammad. They had lived together for around a year in Tacoma, Washington, where Malvo used the alias John Lee Malvo.

Muhammad's identification led to the discovery that he had purchased a former police car, a blue Chevrolet Caprice, in New Jersey on September 11, 2002. A lookout broadcast to the public on that vehicle resulted in the arrest of Muhammad and Malvo when the car was spotted parked at an Interstate 70 rest stop in Myersville, Maryland.

== Criminal case ==
On October 24, 2002, Muhammad was captured in Maryland, where most of the attacks and murders occurred. Although Maryland sought to bring him to trial, United States attorney general John Ashcroft reassigned the case to the jurisdiction of Paul Ebert, the Commonwealth's Attorney for Prince William County, Virginia. Virginia was viewed as more likely to impose a death sentence, which was borne out by the Virginia and Maryland verdicts. Virginia also allowed the death penalty for juveniles.

In October 2003, Muhammad went on trial for the murder of Dean Meyers. The crime had occurred in Prince William County, near the city of Manassas, Virginia. The trial had been moved from Prince William County to Virginia Beach, approximately 200 miles away. Muhammad was granted the right to represent himself in his defense and dismissed his legal counsel, though he immediately switched back to having legal representation after his opening statement. He was charged with murder, terrorism, conspiracy and the illegal use of a firearm and faced a possible death sentence.

Prosecutors said the shootings were part of a plot to extort $10 million from local and state governments. The prosecution said that they would make the case for 16 shootings allegedly involving Muhammad. The terrorism charge against Muhammad required prosecutors to prove he committed at least two shootings in a three-year period.

The prosecution called more than 130 witnesses and introduced more than 400 pieces of evidence intended to prove that Muhammad undertook the murders and ordered Malvo to help carry them out. Evidence included a rifle found in Muhammad's car that was linked by ballistics tests to eight of the 10 killings in the Washington area and two others in Louisiana and Alabama; the car, which was modified so that a sniper could shoot from inside the trunk; and a laptop computer, also found in the car, that contained maps with icons pinpointing shooting scenes. Witness accounts put Muhammad across the street from one shooting and his car near the scene of several others. There was also a recorded phone call to a police hotline in which a man, his voice identified by a detective as Muhammad's, demanded money in exchange for stopping the shootings.

Muhammad's defense asked the court to drop the capital murder charges because there was no direct evidence. Malvo's fingerprints were on the Bushmaster rifle found in Muhammad's car and DNA from Muhammad was discovered on the rifle, but the defense contended that Muhammad could not be put to death under Virginia's "trigger-man law" unless he actually pulled the trigger to kill Meyers, and no one testified that they saw him do so.

On November 17, 2003, Muhammad was convicted of all four counts in the indictment against him: capital murder for the shooting of Meyers, capital murder under Virginia's antiterrorism statute for homicide committed with an intent to terrorize the government or the public at large, conspiracy to commit murder, and the illegal use of a firearm. In the penalty phase of the trial, the jury, after five hours of deliberation over two days, unanimously recommended that Muhammad be sentenced to death. On March 9, 2004, a Virginia judge agreed with the jury's recommendation and sentenced Muhammad to death.

On April 22, 2005, the Virginia Supreme Court affirmed the sentence, stating that Muhammad could be sentenced to death because the murder was part of an act of terrorism. The court also rejected an argument by defense lawyers that he could not be sentenced to death because he was not the triggerman in the killings. Virginia Supreme Court Justice Donald W. Lemons said at the time, "With calculation, extensive planning, premeditation and ruthless disregard for life, Muhammad carried out his cruel scheme of terror."

In May 2005, Maryland and Virginia reached an agreement to allow his extradition to face Maryland charges. He was held at the maximum security Sussex I State Prison near Waverly, Sussex County, Virginia, which houses Virginia's male death row inmates. In August 2005, while awaiting execution in Virginia, he was extradited to Montgomery County, Maryland to face charges there.

On May 30, 2006, a Maryland jury found Muhammad guilty of six counts of murder. He was sentenced to six consecutive life terms without possibility of parole on June 1, 2006. Neither Alabama, Arizona, Louisiana nor Washington (state) moved to try Muhammad, given his death sentence for murder in Virginia. In 2006, Malvo confessed that the pair also killed 14 victims in California, Arizona, and Texas.

On May 6, 2008, it was revealed that Muhammad asked prosecutors in a letter to help him end legal appeals of his conviction and death sentence "so that you can murder this innocent black man." An appeal filed by Muhammad's defense lawyers in April 2008 cited evidence of brain damage that would render Muhammad incompetent to make legal decisions and that he should not have been allowed to represent himself at his Virginia trial.

On September 16, 2009, Prince William County Circuit Court Judge Mary Grace O'Brien set Muhammad's execution date for November 10, 2009. On November 9, 2009, Muhammad's petition for review of his death sentence was denied by the U.S. Supreme Court. Justice John Paul Stevens, joined by Justices Ruth Bader Ginsburg and Sonia Sotomayor, wrote a separate opinion stating that Virginia's rush to set an execution date "highlights once again the perversity of executing inmates before their appeals process has been fully concluded" while noting that they concurred with the decision that the appeal ought not be heard.

== Civil case ==
In 2003, Malvo and Muhammad were named in a civil lawsuit by the Legal Action Project of the Brady Center to Prevent Gun Violence on behalf of two of their victims who were seriously wounded and the families of some of those murdered. Although Malvo and Muhammad were each believed to be indigent, co-defendants Bull's Eye Shooter Supply and Bushmaster Firearms, Inc. contributed to a landmark $2.5 million out-of-court settlement in late 2004.

== Testimony of Lee Boyd Malvo ==
In Muhammad's May 2006 trial in Montgomery County, Maryland, Malvo, who was sentenced to a term of life without parole (later commuted to life with parole) for his role in the shootings, confessed to a more detailed version of the pair's plans. After psychological counseling, he admitted that he was lying at the earlier Virginia trial when he admitted to being the trigger man for every shooting. He said he lied to save Muhammad from a death sentence. Malvo believed that he would not face the death penalty because he was a minor. In two days of testimony, Malvo outlined detailed aspects of all the shootings.

Part of his testimony concerned Muhammad's complete plan with three phases in the Washington, D.C. and Baltimore metro areas. Phase one consisted of meticulously planning, mapping and practicing their locations around the D.C. area so after each shooting they could quickly leave the area on a predetermined path and continue to the next location. Muhammad's goal in phase one was to kill six white people a day for 30 days. Malvo described how phase one did not go as planned due to heavy traffic and the lack of a clear shot or getaway routes.

Phase two was meant to be undertaken in Baltimore, but was never carried out. It was to begin with the killing of a pregnant woman by a shot to the abdomen. The next step was to have been the killing of a Baltimore police officer and, at the officer's funeral, to detonate improvised explosive devices that contained shrapnel to kill police officers attending the funeral.

Phase three was to begin during phase two. It was to extort millions of dollars from the United States government. The money would be used to pay for travel to Canada, stopping en route at YMCAs and orphanages to recruit impressionable young boys with no parents or guidance. Once he recruited a large number of young boys and arrived in Canada, Muhammad would train the boys with weapons and send them across the United States to carry out mass shootings as he had done in Washington, D.C. and Baltimore.

== Execution ==
On November 10, 2009, hours before Muhammad's scheduled execution, pleas for clemency made by his attorneys were denied by Virginia Governor Tim Kaine. Governor Kaine remarked at the time, "I think crimes that are this horrible, you just can't understand them, you can't explain them. They completely dwarf your ability to look into the life of a person who would do something like this and understand why."

Under Virginia law at the time, a defendant convicted of capital murder was allowed to choose the method by which he or she would be put to death—either lethal injection or electrocution. As Muhammad declined to select a method, by law the method of lethal injection was selected for him. He was offered a selection of a last meal, which he accepted. Muhammad's last meal consisted of chicken, red sauce, and cake. On the day of his execution, Muhammad met with relatives and one of his sons several hours beforehand.

Muhammad's execution was scheduled to began at 9 p.m. EST at the Greensville Correctional Center, Greensville County, near Jarratt, Virginia. Wearing a prison standard issue blue shirt and jeans, Muhammad was escorted into the execution chamber at 8:58 p.m EST that evening. Witnesses observed Muhammad being laid down onto the lethal injection gurney and strapped down, remarking that he was emotionless and said nothing during the procedure. After Muhammad was secured to the gurney, the curtain was drawn so witnesses could not observe the execution team's insertion of intravenous catheters into both of his arms. Once the placement procedure was complete, the curtains were drawn back and the warden asked if he had any final words. Muhammad remained silent. The lethal injection process began at 9:06 p.m. EST. At 9:07 p.m. EST, witnesses observed that Muhammad began to twitch slightly as the sedative in Virginia's then-three drug lethal injection protocol began to take effect. This was accompanied by deep breathing and rapid blinking of his eyes. At 9:08 p.m. EST, Muhammad went still. Muhammad was pronounced dead three minutes later at 9:11 p.m. EST.

Muhammad's body was cremated, and the ashes given to his son in Louisiana.

== In film ==
Muhammad is portrayed by Bobby Hosea in the 2003 film D.C. Sniper: 23 Days of Fear, by Ken Foree in the 2010 film D.C. Sniper and by Isaiah Washington in the 2013 film Blue Caprice, and is portrayed anonymously in the 2020 series I, Sniper.

== See also ==
- List of rampage killers in the United States
- List of people executed in Virginia
- List of people executed in the United States in 2009
- List of serial killers by number of victims
- List of serial killers in the United States

Executions carried out in Virginia
Preceded by Edward Nathaniell Bell February 19, 2009	John Allen Muhammad; November 10, 2009	Succeeded by Larry Bill Elliott November 17, 2009
Executions carried out in the United States
Preceded by Yosvanis Calle – Texas November 10, 2009	–John Allen Muhammad Virginia; November 10, 2009	Succeeded by Larry Bill Elliott– Virginia November 17, 2009
