= Phu Loi Base Camp =

Former U.S. Army base in south Vietnam

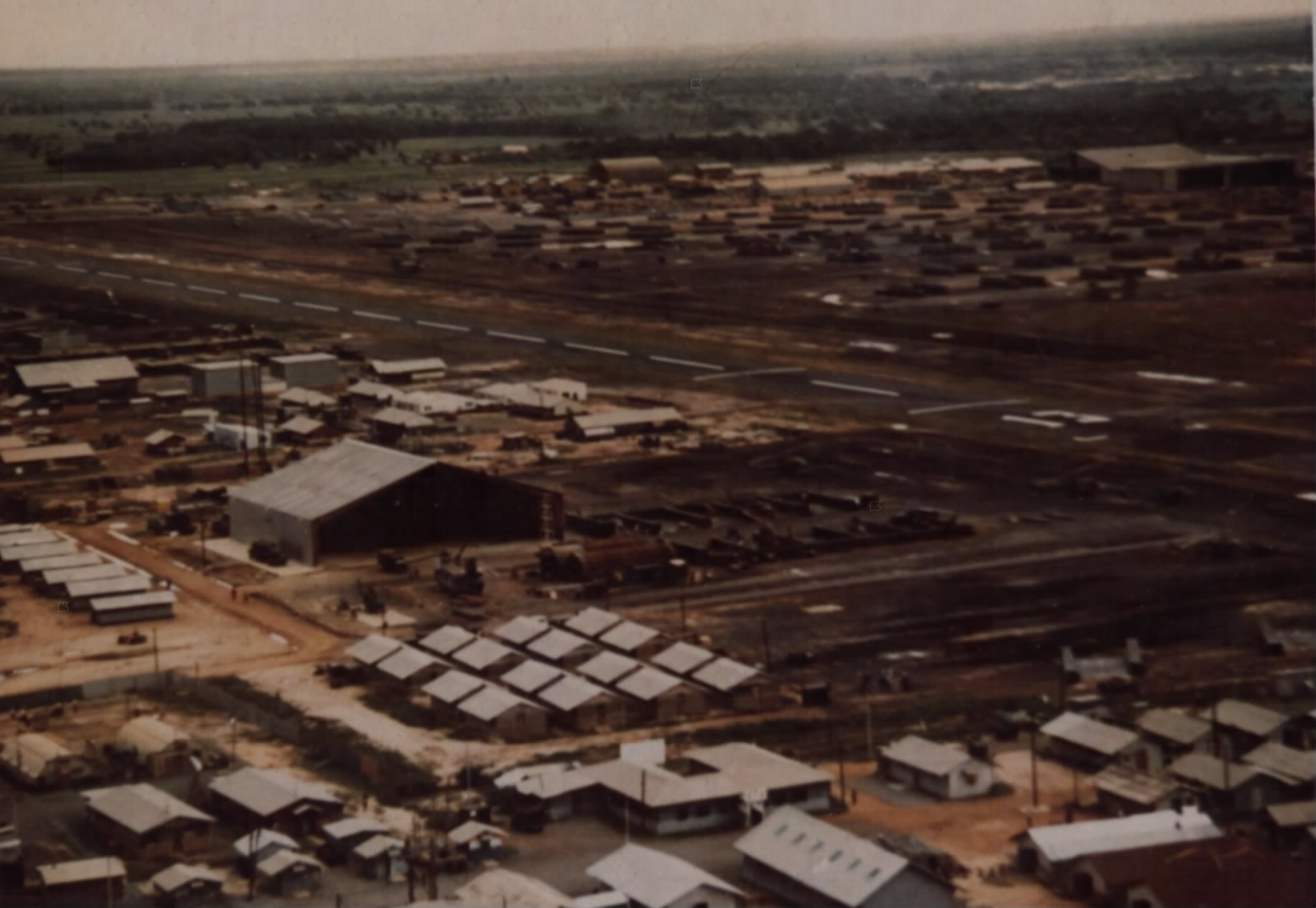
- Phu Loi Base Camp, 16 June 1970

Site information
- Type: Army Base

Location
- Coordinates: 10°59′57″N 106°42′10″E

Site history
- Built: 1965
- In use: 1965-72
- Battles/wars: Vietnam War

Garrison information
- Occupants: 2nd Brigade, 1st Infantry Division; 3rd Brigade, 82nd Airborne Division

Phu Loi Airfield
- IATA: none; ICAO: none

Summary
- Elevation AMSL: 95 ft (29 m)

Runways
| Direction | Length | | Surface |
| Direction | ft | m | Surface |
|---|---|---|---|
| | 2,800 | 853 | asphalt |

Phu Loi Base Camp (also known as Darkhorse Base or Phu Loi Field) is a former U.S. Army base north of Saigon in southern Vietnam.

== History ==
=== 1940s-1963 ===
Phu Loi airfield was originally established by the Japanese in the 1940s and was located approximately 20 km north of Saigon in Bình Dương Province. During the First Indochina War the base was used by the French as a prisoner of war camp for captured Viet Minh. Following the end of the war it was used to imprison opponents of the Ngo Dinh Diem government.

Here, according to North Vietnamese and Vietcong sources, was the site of the Phu Loi massacre in December 1958 by Ngo Dinh Diem troops, where more than 1,000 prisoners were supposedly killed by poison.

=== 1965-72 ===
The U.S. Army base was established in 1965.

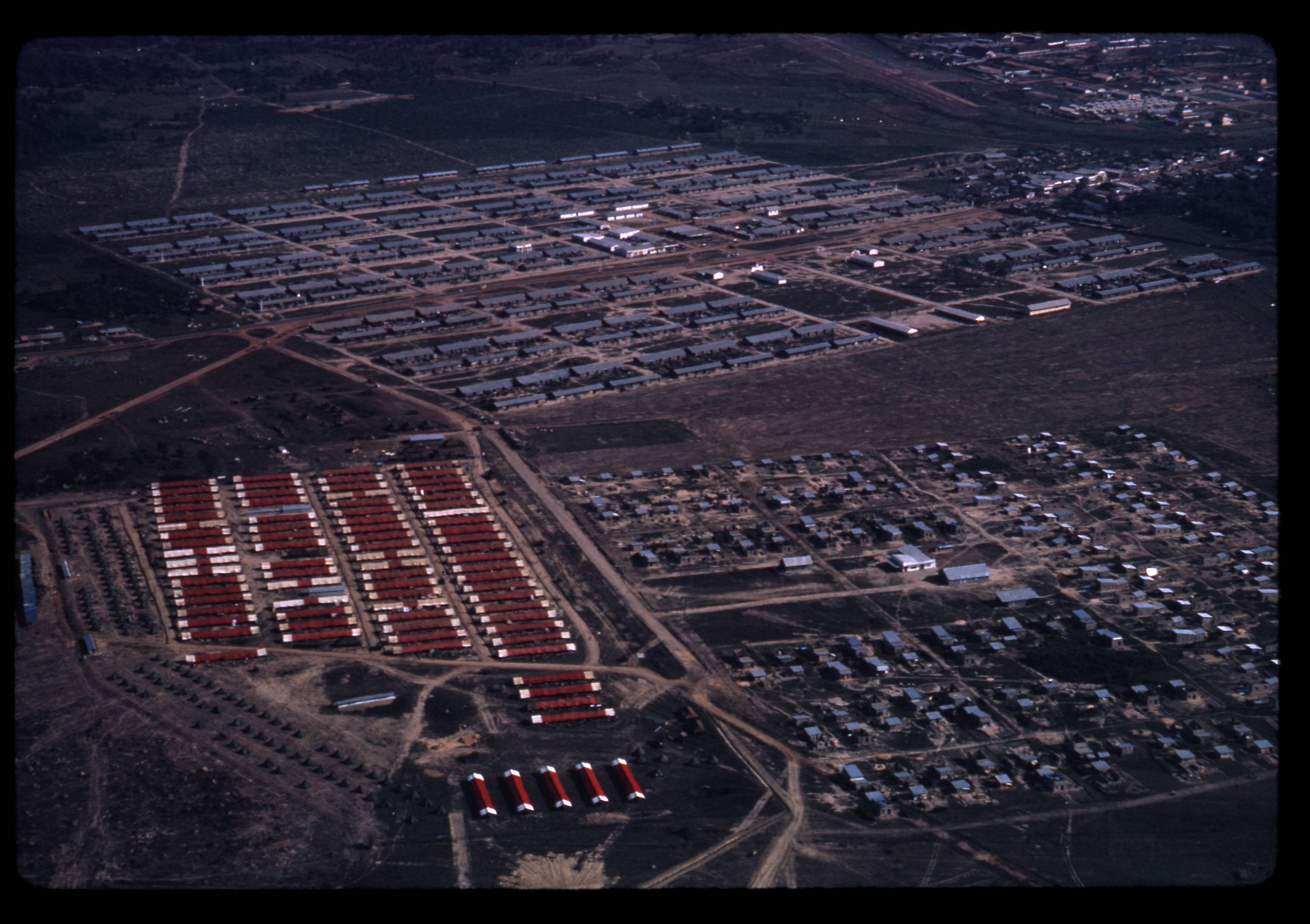
Red tents for refugees from Operation Cedar Falls at Phu Loi, 29 January 1967

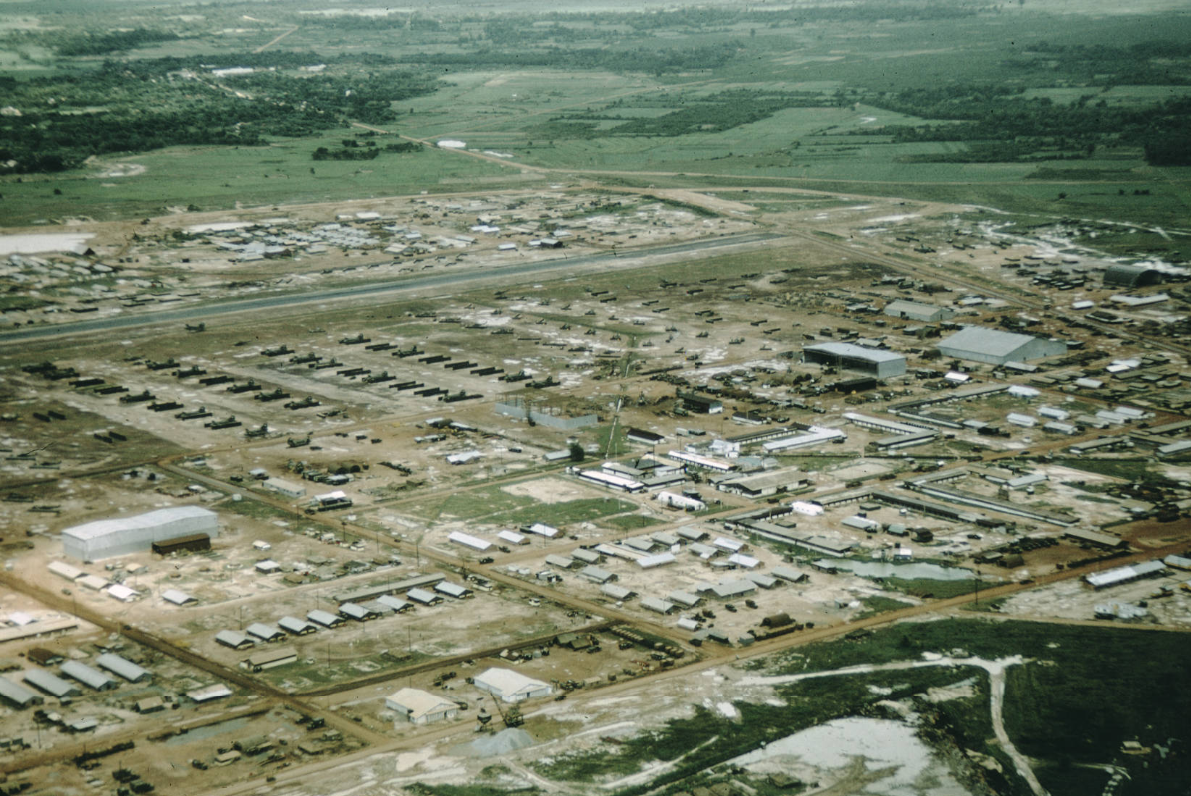
Phu Loi, 23 September 1967

The 2nd Brigade, 1st Infantry Division comprising:

- 2nd Battalion, 16th Infantry Regiment
- 1st Battalion, 18th Infantry Regiment
- 2nd Battalion, 18th Infantry Regiment

was based at Phu Loi from December 1965-February 1966.

The 3rd Brigade, 82nd Airborne Division comprising:

- 1st Battalion, 505th Infantry Regiment
- 2nd Battalion, 505th Infantry Regiment

was based at Phu Loi from September 1968-December 1969

Other units stationed at Phu Loi included:

- 11th Combat Aviation Battalion:
  - 128th Assault Helicopter Company
  - 173rd Assault Helicopter Company before moving to Lai Khe
  - 205th Aviation Support Helicopter Company
  - 213th Aviation Support Helicopter Company
- D Troop, 1st Squadron, 4th Cavalry Regiment
- AVEL Central Avionics (January 1966-April 1972)
- 2nd Battalion, 34th Armor
- 34th Engineer Battalion (May 1968-October 1971)
- 1st Battalion, 27th Artillery (April–November 1967)
- 6th Battalion, 27th Artillery (March 1970-April 1971)
- 2nd Battalion, 32nd Artillery (October 1969-January 1972)
- A Battery, 5th Battalion, 42d Field Artillery (January–March 1972)
- 44th Signal Battalion (May–June 1972)
- 82nd Brigade Support Battalion
- 3rd Battalion, 197th Artillery (September 1968-September 1969)
- Revolutionary Development Task Force (RDTF-Helper) (June 1966-July 1967)

== Current use ==
The base is largely abandoned, but a small section serves a museum. The former airfield is still clearly visible on satellite images.
