= Mildred Muhammad =

American consultant, author and speaker

Mildred D. Muhammad
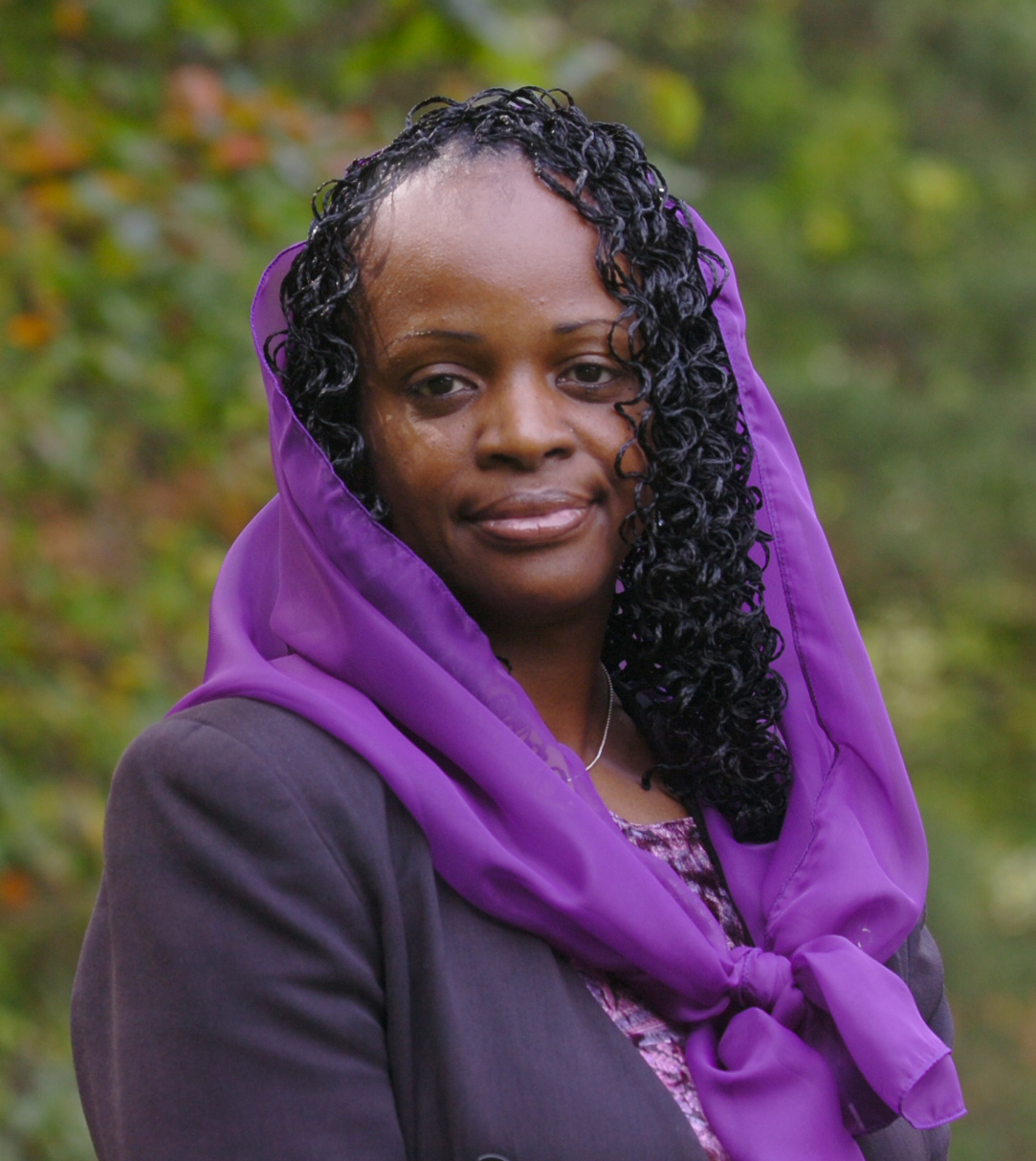
- Born: Mildred Green; 1960 (age 65–66)
- Occupation: Motivational speaker
- Years active: 2001–present
- Spouse: John Allen Muhammad (m. 1988; div. 2001)
- Children: 3
- Website: mildredmuhammad.com

Mildred Dennis Muhammad (née Green; born 1960) is an American author, public speaker, domestic violence awareness advocate, and the ex-wife of John Allen Muhammad, the D.C. spree killer.

== Marriage to John Allen Muhammad ==
Mildred and John Allen both grew up in Baton Rouge, Louisiana. She met John Allen Muhammad (formerly John Allen Williams) in 1985, when she was 23 and living in Louisiana. John was stationed at Fort Lewis while serving in the U.S. Army. Mildred married Muhammad in 1988.

They separated in the year 1999 due to domestic abuse, after which John Muhammad kidnapped their three children, namely John Jr., Salena, and Taalibah, without Mildred's consent and kept their location from Mildred for nearly nine months. In the month of March in the year 2000, she received a restraining order prohibiting him from contacting her or the children.

In the spring of 2001, Mildred relocated with her children to Maryland.

In October 2002, during the 2002 Beltway sniper attacks, a series of shootings that occurred in the Washington, D.C., metropolitan area, ATF agents informed her that she was the intended target of the shooting. John Muhammad had been shooting people in her vicinity to appear random, planning to ultimately kill her as part of his scheme.

== Advocacy and public speaking ==
Mildred is a keynote speaker for U.S. Department of Justice’s Office for Victims of Crime, and CNN contributor. She travels occasionally to promote awareness for domestic abuse and prevention, frequently leading workshops and speaking at events on trauma recovery, victim support, and abuse prevention strategies.

Her story has been featured in various media outlets, including interviews on news networks and documentaries.

== Bibliography ==
Mildred Muhammad has authored several books, including:

- ——— (2010). Scared Silent (autobiography). United States: Strebor Books. ISBN 978-1-53469-208-4.
- ——— (2017). I'm Still Standing: Crawling Out of The Darkness Into The Light (autobiography). United states. ISBN 978-1-53469-208-4.
- ——— (2003). A Survivor's Journal: A Journey from Victim to Survivor (autobiography). US: 4th Estate. ISBN 978-1-53-470481-7
- ——— (2006). Planning My Escape: Safety Plan for Victims/Survivors of Domestic Violence (self help). US: ISBN 978-14-9527232-5.
- ——— (2009). Dare To Heal: Journaling the Pain Away (self help). United states: 4th Estate.

== Awards and recognition ==
Mildred Muhammad has received numerous accolades for her work, including awards from advocacy organizations and recognition from government agencies.

Year	Event	Result	Ref
2007	Military Installation Certificate of Appreciations, Awards & Coins	Honoured	
2008	Shirley Chisholm Woman of Courage Award	Honoured	
2009	Redbook Heroes: Strength & Spirit Award	Honoured	
2013	Domestic Violence Awareness Award	Honoured	
2013	Alpha Phi Alpha Fraternity, Inc	Honoured	
2013	Spirit To Live Beauty Award Atikal Foundation	Honoured	
2013	The Purple Rose Award ~ Arab-American Coalition Against Domestic Violence	Honoured	
2019	The Telly Awards - Ep25: The Mildred Muhammad Story	Won	
2019	ACHI TV Personality of The Year Award	Honoured	

== Personal life ==
Mildred Muhammad lives in the United States and participates in community programs and initiatives, focused on supporting victims and survivors of domestic violence.
