= CENTCOM Materiel Recovery Element =

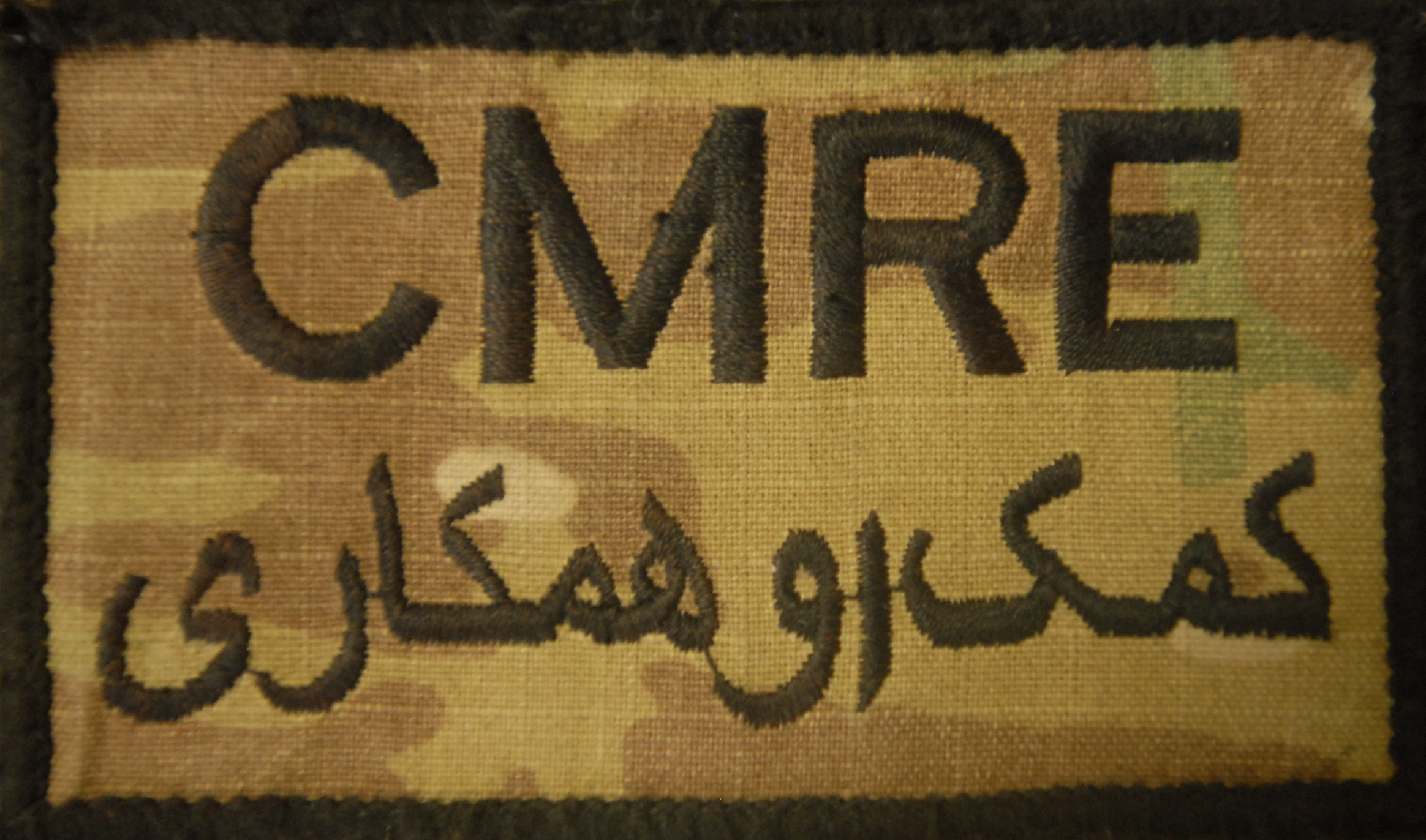
- Active: 2012–??
- Type: Sustainment brigade
- Role: Site clearance and equipment withdrawal
- Size: Brigade
- Part of: 1st Sustainment Command (Theater)

Commanders
- Commander: COL Todd A. Heussner
- Command sergeant major: CSM Anthony A Traylor

Insignia
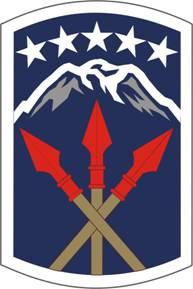
- 593rd Sustainment Brigade shoulder sleeve insignia

The CENTCOM Materiel Recovery Element (CMRE) was a military organization tasked with conducting materiel reduction and engineer deconstruction operations in Afghanistan for the purpose of saving valuable military equipment and returning operating bases to local land owners, the Afghan Local Police, or the Afghan National Army.

The CMRE supported the responsible and gradual transition of U.S. bases and property throughout Afghanistan (the Combined Joint Operational Area-Afghanistan (CJOA-A)) under the direction of Army Forces Central Command. The mission took place from 2012-2014 and beyond.

== History ==
The 593rd Sustainment Brigade (SB) was the first headquarters to command and control the Army's CENTCOM Materiel Recovery Element (CMRE). The 593d SB, led by Colonel Douglas McBride and Command Sergeant Major Eric Taylor, comprising 3,371 active duty, Reserve and National Guard soldiers, sailors, airmen, marines, Department of Defense civilians, and contractors, conducted over 110 geographically dispersed general engineering construction missions in remote and urban environments covering an area larger than Texas (250,000 square miles). The 593d SB processed 17,000 materiel release orders, which constituted the shipping of over 9,000 twenty foot container equivalent units (TEU) of materiel out of Afghanistan, reestablishing positive accountability of over $22 million worth of equipment in the Army supply system thus far.

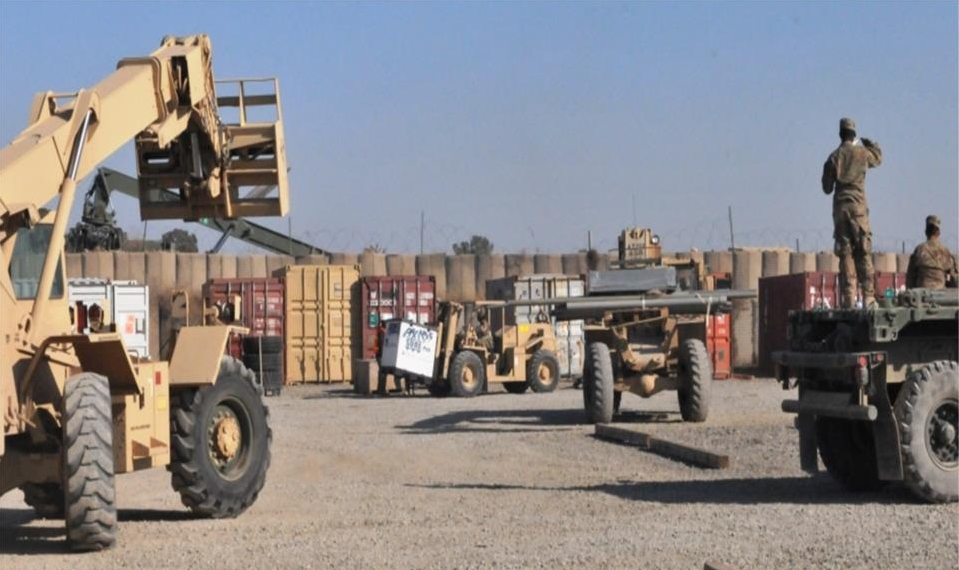
Soldiers of the 18th CSSB working in the materiel distribution yard moving the resources that have been processed in the yard.

Assigned the mission to deconstruct and/or descope U.S. bases in Afghanistan, the 593d SB conducted over ten descoping projects, one complete deconstruction, and two expansions. The brigade assumed responsibility for six of RC-South's high priority projects that included over 350,000 meters of perimeter expansion, headquarters structures for a brigade combat team, and living space for over 6,000 soldiers.

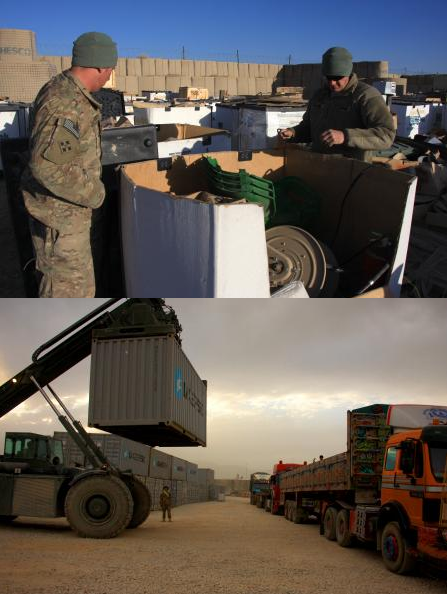
Top: Soldiers of the 18th CSSB sifting through items at the FOB Shank redistribution yard. Bottom: Soldiers of the 18th CSSB loading 20-foot shipping containers onto an out-bound convoy.

The 593d SB was replaced by the 43rd Sustainment Brigade "Trailblazers" commanded by COL Todd Huessner and CSM Anthony Traylor which operated three CMRE retrograde sort yards (RSY) at different airfields (Kandahar, Bagram, and Camp John Pratt) and facilitated 220 base closures and transfers. The Trailblazers established seven forward retrograde elements (FRE) – a coarse retrograde sorting area that expedited sorting operations by 52% and reduced intra-theater retrograde transportation by 73%, as compared to existing doctrinal practices from Operation New Dawn withdrawing from Iraq. The 43d SBDE withdrew excess materiel on the battlefield out of nearly 125 FOBs in Regional Commands North, East, South, Capital, Southwest and West. The brigade achieved all this, while simultaneously collaborating with numerous logistics entities such as the Defense Logistics Agency-Disposal Services, United States Army Communications-Electronics Command, Army Command, Tank and Armament Command, Army Materiel Command and Expeditionary Disposal Remediation Teams.

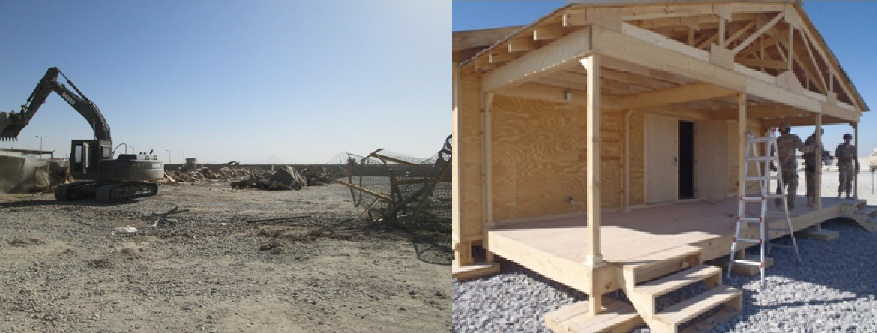
Left: Soldiers of the 62nd EN BN rebuilding a FOB in Afghanistan. Right: Soldiers of the 62nd EN BN finishing the construction of a post office.

43d SBDE had three subordinate battalions:

•62nd Engineer Battalion (TF HAMMER), commanded by Lieutenant Colonel Marvin L. Griffin and Command Sergeant Major Brian Holschbach, established procedures for engineer support to CMRE missions, effectively and safely delivered construction support, and transitioned the mission to follow-on engineer units.

•68th Combat Sustainment (TF WAR WAGON) Support Battalion, commanded by Lieutenant Colonel Jeremy Lewis and Command Sergeant Major Ashley, provided support team throughout the Combined Joint Operations Afghanistan (CJOA) to help with the CMRE mission.

•864th Engineer Battalion (TF PACEMAKER), commanded by Lieutenant Colonel John W. Henderson and Command Sergeant Major Christopher D. Tipton, completed base closures and base transfer to prepare for the exit of Operation Enduring Freedom (OEF).

For OEF 2013 - 2014, the 82nd Sustainment Brigade replaced the 43d SBDE. The 82nd Sustainment Brigade was led by Colonel Mark D. Collins and Command Sergeant Major Alberto Delgado. Their mission was to focus on engineer deconstruction of bases and provide leadership and standards across a diverse unit composed primarily of Army National Guard and Army Reserve Soldiers. The command team engaged stakeholders across the entire country in order to facilitate deconstruction of bases and advance the CMRE mission. The team also invested numerous hours toward formal Officer Professional Development, advanced safety standards, and logistics and recovery efforts. Colonel Collins was well prepared for the assignment. He possesses a Masters of Science in Logistics Management, a Masters of Arts in Strategic Studies, and was the recipient of the prestigious U.S. Army CGSC MG James Wright Distinguished Master Logistician Award, 2004.

For the engineer units that hold primary responsibility for work, the USANG's 133rd Engineer Battalion replaced the 864th Engineer Battalion and USARC's 489th Engineer Battalion replaced the 62nd Engineer Battalion. The 489th Engineer Battalion (Task Force Ironman) was led by Lieutenant Colonel Leslie Templin, and Command Sergeant Major David Douthat. The 489th Engineer Battalion (Task Force Ironman) had primary responsibility for closures throughout RC-South, and RC-Southwest. The engineer companies of the 489th included the 955th Horizontal Engineers, the 455th Route Clearance Engineers, the 1223rd Vertical Engineers, the 276th Vertical Engineers, 760th Vertical Engineers, and the 489th Engineer Battalion Headquarters Company, and the 489th Engineer Battalion Forward Support Company. The 489th Battalion was composed of Army Reserve soldiers, with the exception of the 1223rd Engineer Company and the 276th Engineer Company, both Army National Guard units.

The 133rd Engineer Battalion was led by Lieutenant Colonel Dean Preston, and Command Sergeant Major Kevin Walsh. The 133rd Engineer Battalion (Task Force Black Bear) had primary responsibility for closures throughout RC-North, RC-Capital, and RC-East. The engineer companies of the 133rd included the 150th Horizontal Engineers, the 388th Route Clearance Engineers, the 1151st Vertical Engineers, the 779th Horizontal Engineers, and the 858th Horizontal Engineers. These companies were supported by three smaller elements: the 1035th Survey and Design Detachment, 133rd Engineer Battalion Headquarters Company, and the 133rd Engineer Battalion Forward Support Company. The 133rd Battalion was composed of Army National Guard soldiers, with the exception of the 779th Engineer Company and the 388th Engineer Company, which both came from the Army Reserve.

The 45th Sustainment Brigade replaced the 82nd Sustainment Brigade in May 2014. The 779 Engineer Company (Horizontal), led by CPT Michael Sandberg was the last element of the 82nd SB to remain in Afghanistan. With project ownership of the ASP redesign and fortification at Bagram Airfield, Camp Marmal retro-sizing, FOB Ghazni retro-sizing, and Camp Dwyer retro-sizing, the 779 Engineers were actively engaged throughout the battlespace including completion of the largest military engineering construction project of the Deployment Cycle. All of these missions were accomplished under the 133rd Engineer Battalion and the 82nd Sustainment Brigade.

On 17 June 2014, the 877th Engineer Battalion of the Alabama Army National Guard replaced the 133rd Engineer Battalion as the primary CMRE Engineer asset in RC-East.
