= 593rd Corps Sustainment Command =

United States Army sustainment command

- 1st Corps SSI, worn by the 593rd CSC
- Active: 1 May 2007 – present
- Country: United States
- Branch: United States Army
- Role: Sustainment
- Size: Brigade
- Part of: I Corps
- Garrison/HQ: Joint Base Lewis-McChord
- Motto: Rest Assured
- Website: Official Website

Commanders
- Commanding General: COL Erin C. Miller
- Command Sergeant Major: CSM Edward M. Bower
- Deputy Commander: COL Joseph W. Greenlee

Insignia
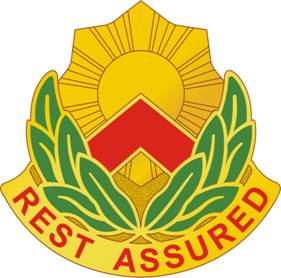
- Distinctive unit insignia

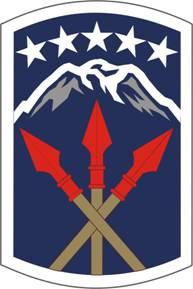
- Previous SSI of 593rd Sustainment Brigade

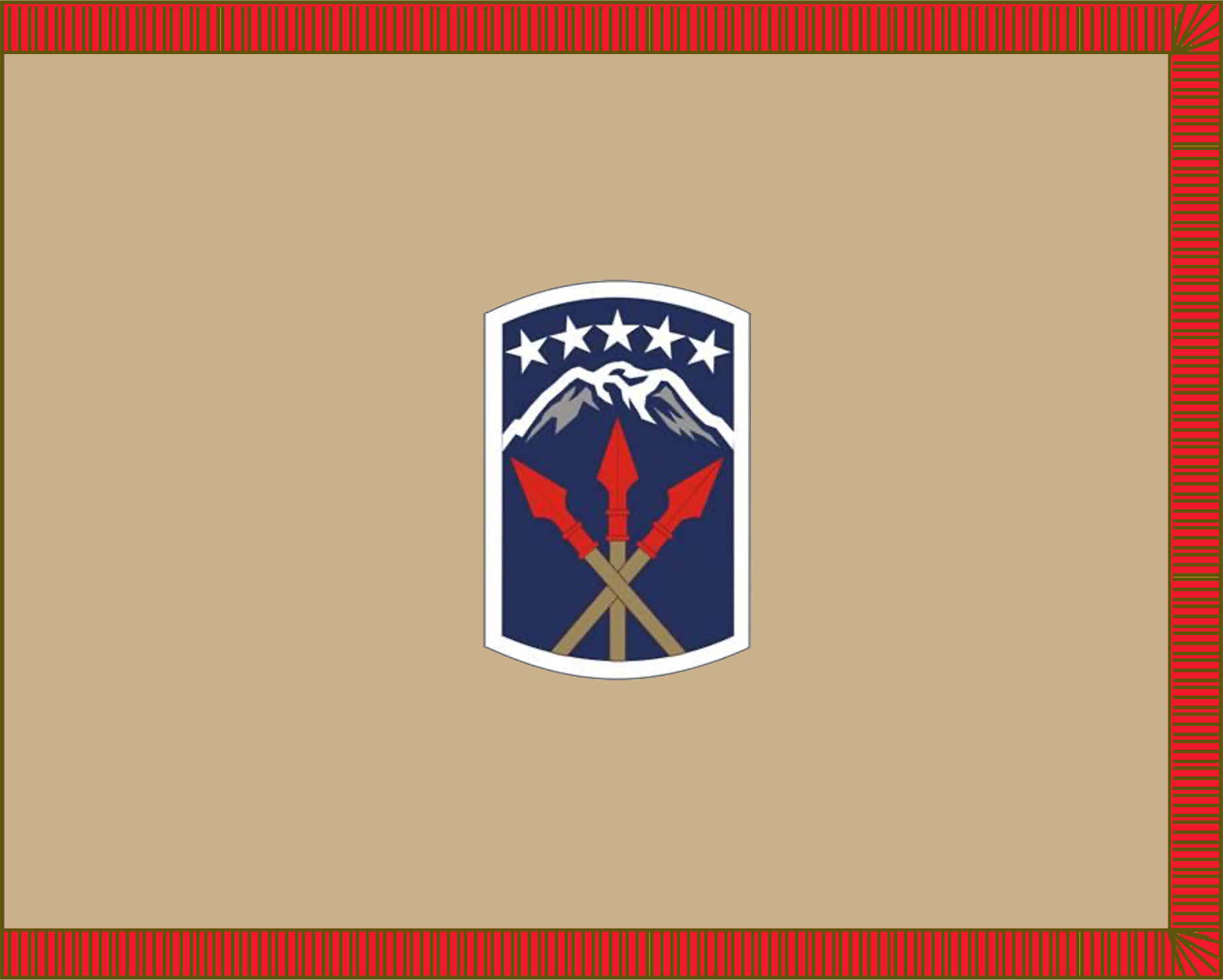
- 593rd Corps Sustainment Command Flag

The 593rd Corps Sustainment Command (593rd CSC) is a Sustainment Command of the United States Army.

== History ==
The 593d Corps Sustainment Command (593d CSC) was originally the 1350th Engineer Base Depot Brigade, activated 1 August 1944, for service in World War II and constituted 7 August 1944. The brigade was inactivated on the islands of Leyte and Luzon in the Philippines on 20 May 1946.

It was reactivated as the 593d Engineer Base Depot in Guam on 16 December 1948. Following a series of reactivations and redefinitions, it participated in 14 campaigns in Vietnam from 1966 to 1972 as the 593d General Support Group assigned as HQ Qui Nhon Sub Area Command of the 1st Logistics Command, earning its second Meritorious Unit Commendation and the Vietnamese Cross of Gallantry with Palm.

Inactivated in April 1972, it was again activated on 21 March 1973, as the 593d Area Support Group at Fort Lewis. The Group was immediately responsible for many post-support missions critical to the day-to-day operations of Fort Lewis, while simultaneously being prepared to deploy worldwide in support of I Corps, PACOM, Homeland Defense and War on Terrorism requirements across the full spectrum of Army, Joint and Interagency operations. Brigade personnel and units have supported a variety of missions ranging from SBCT National Training Center rotations, conducting the command, control and onward movement of all equipment during the redeployment of the 4th Brigade Combat Team, 2d Infantry Division, to the Japanese CALFEX while annually hosting the Washington Special Olympics.

On 31 August 1990, the 593d Area Support Group deployed to Saudi Arabia for participation in operations Desert Shield, Desert Storm and Desert Farewell. In addition, the 593d Area Support Group deployed on 24 December 1992, to Somalia for Operation Restore Hope.

On 16 November 1993, the 593d Area Support Group was re-designated as the 593d Corps Support Group. Following its re-designation, it was deployed to El Salvador for a Joint Humanitarian Mission. Between November 1998 and February 1999, the 593d Corps Support Group successfully joined with other military personnel to restore hope in that part of Central America.

On 16 January 2004, the 593d Corps Support Brigade deployed to Iraq in support of Operation Iraqi Freedom providing logistical support for the 13th COSCOM. The 593d Corps Support Brigade also has supported Operation Enduring Freedom by sending units to Afghanistan.

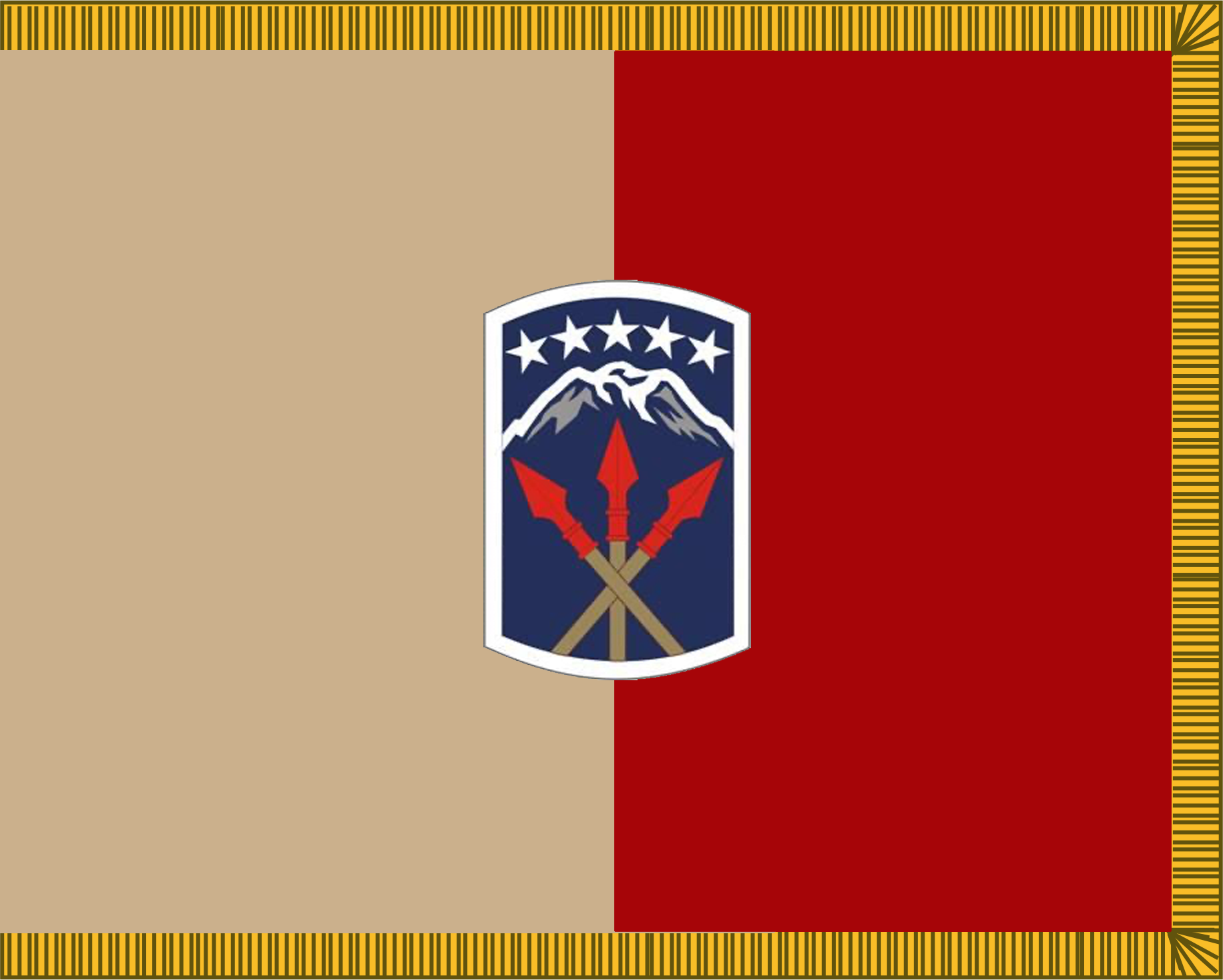
593rd Sustainment Brigade Flag

On 28 June 2006, the 593d Corps Support Brigade deployed again to Iraq and exercised command and control over all Army logistics in western Iraq. On 1 May 2007, the 593d Corps Support Brigade transformed into the 593d Sustainment Brigade in Al Asad, Iraq. The 593d Sustainment Brigade again deployed in support of Operation Iraqi Freedom in May 2009, executing one of the largest retrograde operations in history when it supported the 1st Theater Sustainment Command moving equipment and supplies both out of Iraq and into Afghanistan.

On 12 June 2012 the 593d Sustainment Brigade deployed to Afghanistan as the headquarters of the CENTCOM Materiel Recovery Element (CMRE) directing and managing base closures and the flow of equipment and supplies out of the Afghanistan Theater.

Upon redeployment to JBLM, the 593d Sustainment Brigade was reset and converted to an Corps Sustainment Command (CSC) and continues to provide logistical support to I Corps, Joint Base Lewis-McChord and the United States Army. *

593d SB became the first command of the CENTCOM Materiel Recovery Element (CMRE) mission in Afghanistan in June 2012.

593d ESC was officially stood up as an ESC on 27 August 2013 by BG Kurt Ryan and CSM Erik Frey.

On 16 April, 2025, 593d ESC officially redesignated from an ESC to a CSC; dawning the I Corps patch to support I Corps, JBLM, and the Pacific Command Area of Operations (AO).

== Mission statement ==
593rd Sustainment Command (Expeditionary) provides deployable mission command to support joint forces, coalition forces and civil authorities; supports sustainment, theater opening, and RSO to enable freedom of action in the PACOM AOR; and provides trained and ready forces from JBLM in support of Unified Land Operations. *

== Organization ==
Organization of the command is as follows;

- Headquarters and Headquarters Company, 593rd Sustaiment Command
- 13th Combat Sustainment Support Battalion
- 864th Engineer Battalion
- 504th Military Police Battalion

== Official website ==
- 593rd Corps Sustainment Command - JBLM
- 593d Corps Sustainment Command - JBLM
