= 82nd Light Support Battalion =

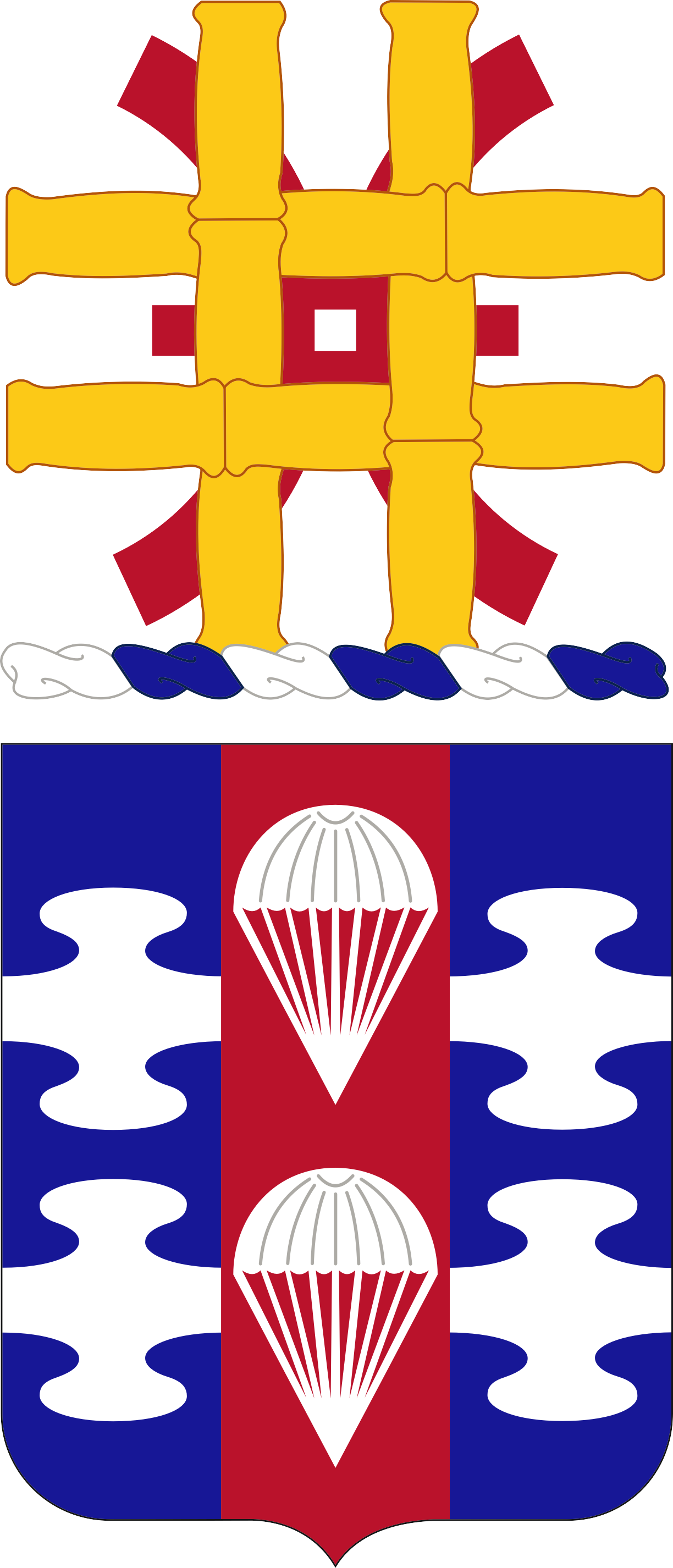
- 82nd Light Support Battalion Coat of Arms
- Active: 25 May 1968-Present
- Country: United States
- Branch: United States Army
- Type: Support
- Part of: 3rd Brigade Combat Team, 82nd Airborne Division
- Garrison/HQ: Fort Bragg, NC
- Engagements: Vietnam War: Counteroffensive, Phase IV; Counteroffensive, Phase V; Counteroffensive, Phase VI; Tet 69/Counteroffensive; Summer-Fall 1969; Winter-Spring 1970
- Decorations: Meritorious Unit Commendation (Army); Republic of Vietnam Cross of Gallantry with Palm

Insignia
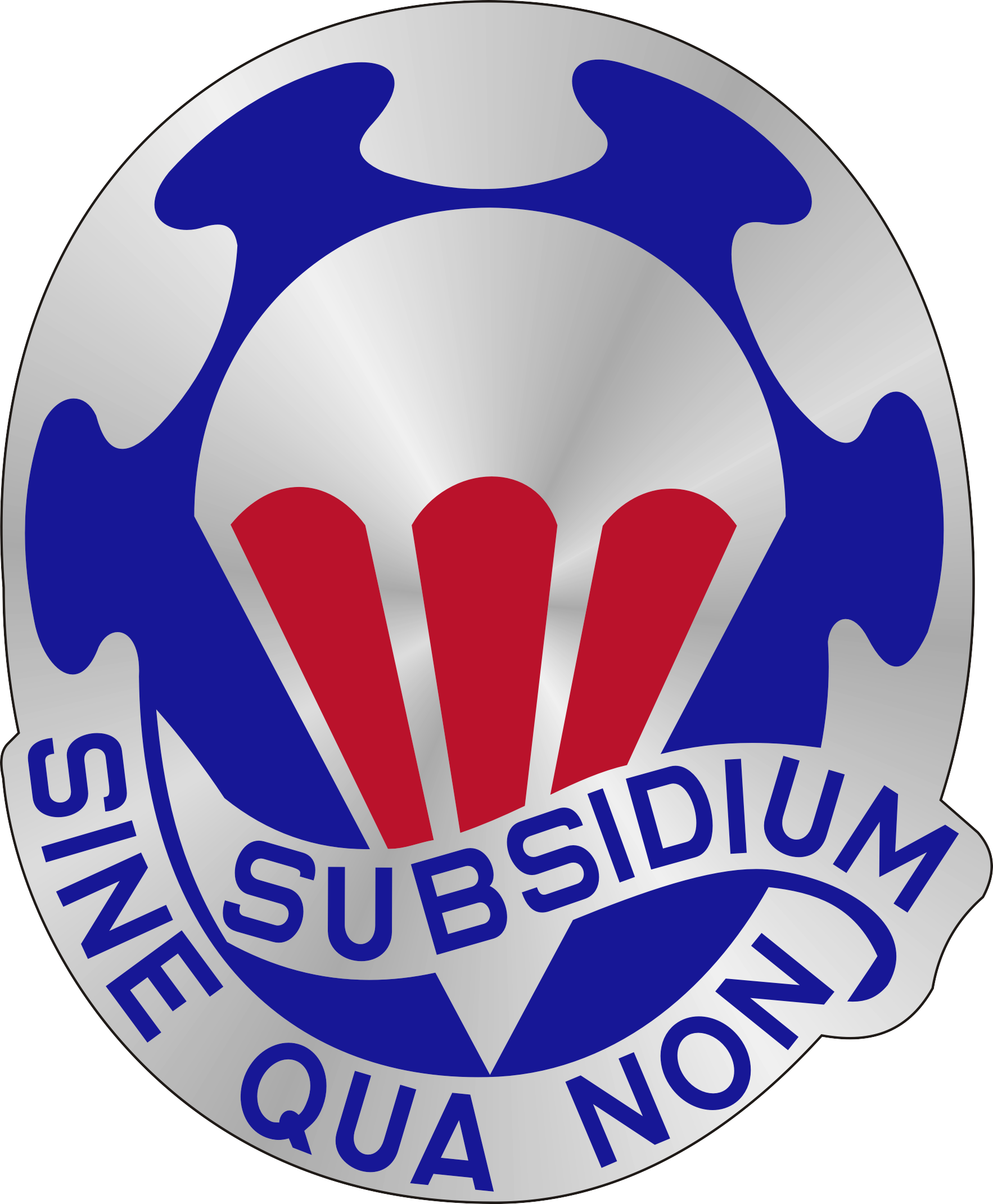
- Distinctive Unit Insignia

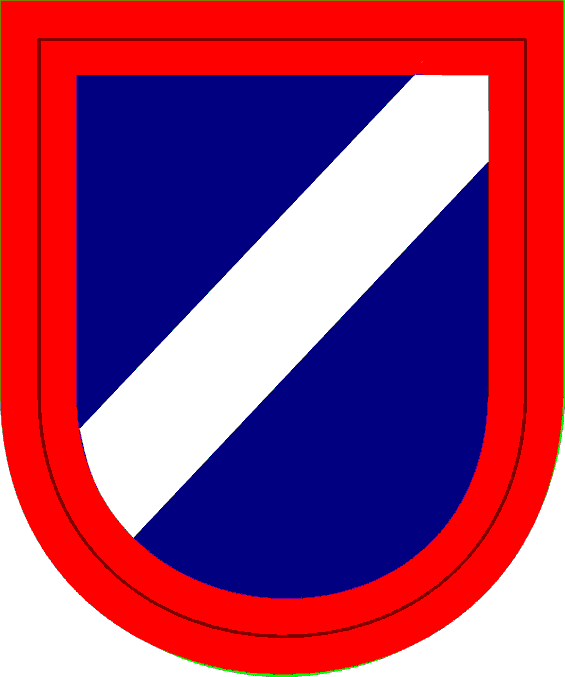
- Beret flash

- Combat Service Identification Badge

The 82nd Light Support Battalion is a United States Army battalion that is part of the 3rd Brigade Combat Team, 82nd Airborne Division, Fort Bragg, North Carolina.

== Vietnam ==
It was activated 25 May 1968 as the 82nd Support Battalion in Republic of Vietnam with the 3rd Brigade, 82nd Airborne Division. The battalion was deactivated on 15 December 1969 upon redeployment to Fort Bragg, North Carolina. During its service in Vietnam, the 82nd Support Battalion earned the Meritorious Unit Commendation (MUC) for the period of 1 March 1969 – 15 November 1969 and the Republic of Vietnam Cross of Gallantry with Palm. Company A also received a MUC for the period of 25 May 1968 – 28 February 1969. Company C was awarded the Presidential Unit Citation and Vietnam Civil Action citation.

HHC was located at Phu Loi Post, north of Saigon. The Main Support Element (MSE), which was stationed at Phu Loi, provided back-up supply, maintenance, administrative, and all other services except for postal services. In addition to logistical support, the battalion was tasked to defend a large portion of the Phu Loi Base defensive perimeter consisting of 17 bunkers and 2 sentry towers that guarded one mile of Sitting Bull Bunkerline.

The Forward Support Element (FSE) was stationed at Tan Son Nhut, which was on the airfield in Saigon. It was commanded by Major Perry C. Reynolds. It provided direct maintenance and all classes of supply except Class V and Class VI. The FSE also provided medical and dental care to 3rd Brigade's three maneuver battalions, and artillery battalion, and all assigned and attached forward elements.

A small section of HHC was responsible for all R&R as well as arranging for USO shows.

A Company ran the replacement detachment. It was responsible for the one-week training of all incoming personnel to 3rd BDE and others assigned to Phu Loi. From January to September 1969, A Company had trained 4,900 personnel.

B Company was responsible for two operational elements: one in Phu Loi and the other with the FSE.

C Company provided direct support, maintenance, tech. supply, and transportation.

The Campaign Participation Credits are as follows:

- Counteroffensive, Phase IV
- Counteroffensive, Phase V
- Counteroffensive, Phase VI
- Tet 69/Counteroffensive
- Summer-Fall 1969
- Winter-Spring 1970

== Additional information ==
- 82nd FSB History Book 1: 1968 – December 1994
- 82nd FSB History Book 2: February 1995 – June 1995
