= 864th Engineer Battalion (United States) =

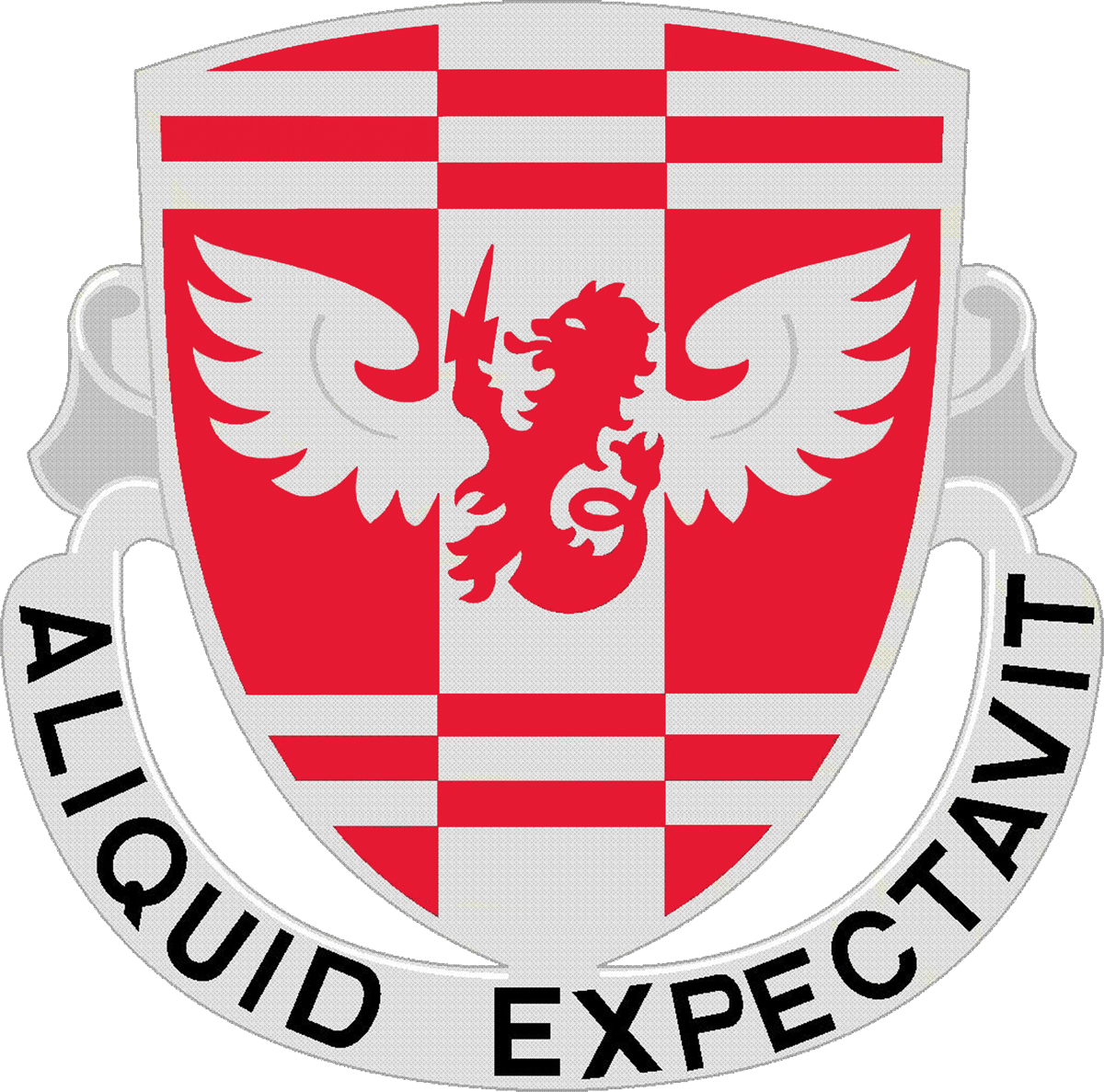
- 864th Engineer Battalion Distinctive Unit Insignia
- Active: February 1942 – Present
- Country: United States of America
- Allegiance: Federal
- Branch: Regular Army
- Type: Battalion
- Role: Engineer Battalion
- Part of: 593rd Corps Sustainment Command
- Nickname: "Pacemakers"
- Mottos: ALIQUID EXPECTAVIT (Anything Expected)

Commanders
- Current commander: LTC Mark S. Born
- Command Sergeant Major: CSM Ramon Juarez

The 864th Engineer Battalion is a combat engineer battalion of the United States Army based at Joint Base Lewis-McChord, Washington. The battalion is a subordinate unit of the 593rd Corps Sustainment Command.

== History ==
The 864th Aviation Battalion was activated in December 1942 at Geiger Field, Washington, now Spokane International Airport. The Battalion served in the Pacific Theater during World War II, earning three campaign streamers for New Guinea, the Bismarck Archipelago, and Luzon. The unit also earned the Philippine Presidential Unit Citation. The unit was deactivated in Japan on 30 June 1946. The army allotted the battalion to the organized Reserves and activated it at Morristown, New Jersey on 14 March 1949.

The unit was deactivated the following September. In March 1951, the Army reactivated the battalion at Tulsa, Oklahoma, only to inactivate it a year later. In 1955 the battalion was withdrawn from the Army Reserve and allotted to the Regular Army. The 864th was reactivated at Wolters Air Force Base, Texas on 25 September 1955. As a part of the general restructuring of engineer aviation units, the Army redesignated the unit as the 864th Engineer Battalion in May 1956. In May 1965, the battalion was shipped to Cam Ranh Bay, South Vietnam.

The battalion was the first U.S. engineer battalion-size unit in Vietnam and responsible for port transportation and support facilities construction. As more engineer battalions were assigned to Vietnam, the unit was assigned missions of base camp construction and line of communication construction and maintenance. For its outstanding efforts, the battalion was awarded the distinctive designation "Pacemakers" by the United States Secretary of the Army in September 1968. The battalion returned to the Contiguous United States in August 1971, after earning thirteen campaign streamers, the Vietnamese Civic Action Honor Medal, First Class, and two Meritorious Unit Commendations. In the Contiguous United States, the battalion was assigned to Fort Lewis, Washington.

The battalion was reorganized in June 1976 as an Engineer Combat Battalion (Heavy). During the period 1983–1990, the battalion deployed vertical platoons to Honduras in support of the U.S. Southern Command. In 1987, the battalion was reorganized with a Headquarters and Support Company and three line companies, which included Charlie Company which was stationed at the Presidio of San Francisco. In January 1991, the battalion deployed to Saudi Arabia for eight months in support of Operations Desert Shield and Desert Storm. During this period, the 864th was responsible for construction of 290 miles of petroleum pipeline, the repair and maintenance of main supply routes, enemy prisoner of war camp construction, and provided emergency services restoration to Kuwait City.

In 1992, the battalion deployed a platoon to Guantánamo Bay, Cuba, providing humanitarian relief to Haitian refugees. In the winter of 1993, the battalion deployed to Arizona in support of Joint Task Force Six (JTF-6), providing a multitude of construction missions in support of the United States Border Patrol and various law enforcement agencies. In July 1993, Charlie Company, 864th Engineer Battalion was inactivated and colors retired. Bravo Company and support elements from HSC deployed to Honduras to build schools from June 1994 to September 1994. The battalion deployed elements from HSC, Alpha and Bravo Companies to McCall, Idaho in support of Task Force "Rugged-Pacemaker" to fight forest fires in the summer of 1994.

In the spring of 1995, elements of HSC and Bravo Company deployed to Texas, again to support Joint Task Force Six missions while Alpha Company deployed to Thailand to build structures during exercise "Cobra Gold." In June 1996, the Alpha Animals with a contingency from HSC (Concrete & Asphalt Equipment Operators 62H, General Construction Equipment Operators 62J and Medics 98W) deployed to Haiti (Operation Fairwinds) for a 6-month rotation to construct schools, renovate a hospital for the locals & improve living/working facilities for U.S. Service Members. Meanwhile, HSC and elements of Bravo Company deployed to Hanford, Washington, with one day notice, to combat fires in that area. In April 1997, Bravo Company deployed to Thailand in support of "COBRA GOLD" to provide humanitarian and civic assistance, in the form of new construction and facilities upgrade.

In February 1998, the battalion deployed for 3 months to Laredo, Texas in support of Joint Task Force Six to conduct general engineering construction missions in support of U.S. Border Patrol. This included erecting 2 k-span buildings for a helicopter hangar & barracks, quarrying operations & replacing closed culverts with open fjord-type culverts. Bravo also deployed to Alaska in September 1998 through October 1998 to conduct base camp and road construction in support of JTF ALASKAN ROAD. HSC and the Earth Moving Platoons from Alpha and Bravo company deployed to White Sands, New Mexico to conduct horizontal construction missions to include road and airfield construction, and two new golf course fairways and a driving range from February 1999 to April 1999. Meanwhile, in April 1999, Bravo company deployed a vertical platoon to Abilene, Texas in support of JTF-6 and the Abilene Police Department to construct a shoot house for their training facility. Shortly thereafter, in May 1999, Alpha company deployed to Thailand in support of "COBRA GOLD" to again provide humanitarian and civic assistance, in the form of new construction and facilities upgrade. Alpha company and elements from HSC and Bravo company deployed to KOSOVO to conduct base camp construction and facilities upgrade along with constructing and improving existing road networks for Camp Bondsteel and the NATO forces assigned there from August 1999 through February 2000. Meanwhile, Bravo and HSC were busy taking part in constructions missions that were vital to the Army's new Medium Brigade Transformation Project being conducted at Fort Lewis. In mid-2001 the battalion began to work closely with the President's counter-drug agency, JTF-6. In August, Alpha Company deployed to New York City to build a state-of-the-art classroom facility for the New York City Police Department.

In March 2002, Alpha Company also deployed to Fallon, Nevada in order to build several training targets for the Naval air station located there. In March Bravo, Company was also busy planning for and then executing a training facility for JTF-6 in San Diego, California. Not to be outdone, HSC deployed to Alaska for an Alaskan Roads improvement program that lasted from June 2002 through September 2002.

In March 2003, the 864th Engineer Battalion deployed to Kuwait in support of Operation Enduring Freedom and Operation Iraqi Freedom. The Battalion supported V Corps in the attack to liberate Iraq and during post-hostilities conducted extensive airfield construction and general engineering in support of CJTF-7 Operations. The battalion redeployed on 20 February 2004 to Fort Lewis, Washington. The 864th Engineer Battalion deployed again on 28 March 2005 as part of Operation Enduring Freedom IV, V, and VI to Afghanistan. The 864th redeployed to Fort Lewis on 27 March 2006 and then deployed yet again ten months later in February 2007 to Afghanistan in support of Operation Enduring Freedom VI, VII, and VIII. The 864th Engineer Battalion redeployed from Afghanistan in May 2008 and recently reformed into a construction battalion.

In January 2010 864th also sent companies in support of both Operation's Enduring Freedom and New Dawn. Key notes during support of Operation Enduring Freedom include supporting Operation Dragon Strike during a summer offensive.

== Organization ==
The unit is composed of the following units:

- Headquarters and Headquarters Company (HHC), (Joint Base Lewis-McChord (JBLM), Washington)
- Forward Support Company (FSC), (JBLM, WA)
- 610th Engineer Support Company (610th ESC), (JBLM, WA)
- 570th Combat Engineer Company - Infantry, (JBLM, WA)
- 557th Engineer Construction Company (557th ECC), (JBLM, WA).
- 585th Engineer Construction Company (DEACTIVATED), (JBLM, WA).

== Lineage ==
Constituted 14 December 1942 in the Army of the United States as the 864th Engineer Aviation Battalion

Activated 1 January 1943 at Geiger Field, Washington

Inactivated 30 June 1946 in Japan

Allotted 18 February 1949 to the Organized Reserve Corps

Activated 14 March 1949 at Morristown, New Jersey

Inactivated 22 September 1949 at Morristown, New Jersey

Activated 1 March 1951 at Tulsa, Oklahoma

(Organized Reserve Corps redesignated 9 July 1952 as the Army Reserve)

Inactivated 11 July 1952 at Tulsa, Oklahoma

Withdrawn 8 July 1955 from the Army Reserve and allotted to the Regular Army

Activated 25 September 1955 at Wolters Air Force Base, Texas

Reorganized and redesignated 15 May 1956 as the 864th Engineer Battalion

(Lettered companies inactivated 16 October 2008 at Fort Lewis, Washington; Support Company concurrently constituted and activated)

557th Engineer Company (Horizontal) inactivated 15 October 2014 in support of Army Structure Reorganization (Total Army Analysis 15-19)

28th Engineer Detachment(Concrete) inactivated 1 September 2015 due to 12V MOS leaving Active Duty and returning to Army Reserve and National Guard only

== Campaign participation credit ==
- World War II:

New Guinea, Bismarck Archipelago, Luzon

- Vietnam:

Defense, Counteroffensive, Counteroffensive Phase II, Counteroffensive Phase III, Tet Counteroffensive, Counteroffensive Phase IV, Counteroffensive Phase V, Counteroffensive Phase VI, Tet 69/Counteroffensive, Summer-Fall 1969, Winter-Spring 1970, Sanctuary Counteroffensive, Counteroffensive Phase VII,

- Southwest Asia:

Defense of Saudi Arabia, Liberation and Defense of Kuwait, Cease-Fire

- Iraq:

Liberation of Iraq, Transition of Iraq, Iraqi Sovereignty

- Kosovo:

Camp BondSteel Infrastructure and surrounding areas, A Company, in support of 1st Infantry Division August 1999 - February 2000

- Afghanistan:

Consolidation I, Consolidation II, Consolidation III, Transition I

== Decorations ==
- Valorous Unit Award, Streamer embroidered SOUTHERN AND EASTERN AFGHANISTAN 2005
- Valorous Unit Award, Streamer embroidered SOUTHERN AFGHANISTAN 2010-2011
- Meritorious Unit Commendation (Army), Streamer embroidered VIETNAM 1965-1967
- Meritorious Unit Commendation (Army), Streamer embroidered VIETNAM 1967-1968
- Meritorious Unit Commendation (Army), Streamer embroidered SOUTHWEST ASIA 1990-1991
- Meritorious Unit Commendation (Army), Streamer embroidered SOUTHWEST ASIA 2003
- Meritorious Unit Commendation (Army), Streamer embroidered AFGHANISTAN 2005-2006
- Meritorious Unit Commendation (Army), Streamer embroidered AFGHANISTAN 2007-2008
- Meritorious Unit Commendation (Army), Streamer embroidered AFGHANISTAN 2010-2011
- Philippine Presidential Unit Citation, Streamer embroidered 17 OCTOBER 1944 TO 4 JULY 1945
- Republic of Vietnam Civil Action Honor Medal, First Class, Streamer embroidered VIETNAM 1970-1971
