= 14th Engineer Battalion =

14th Brigade Engineer Battalion
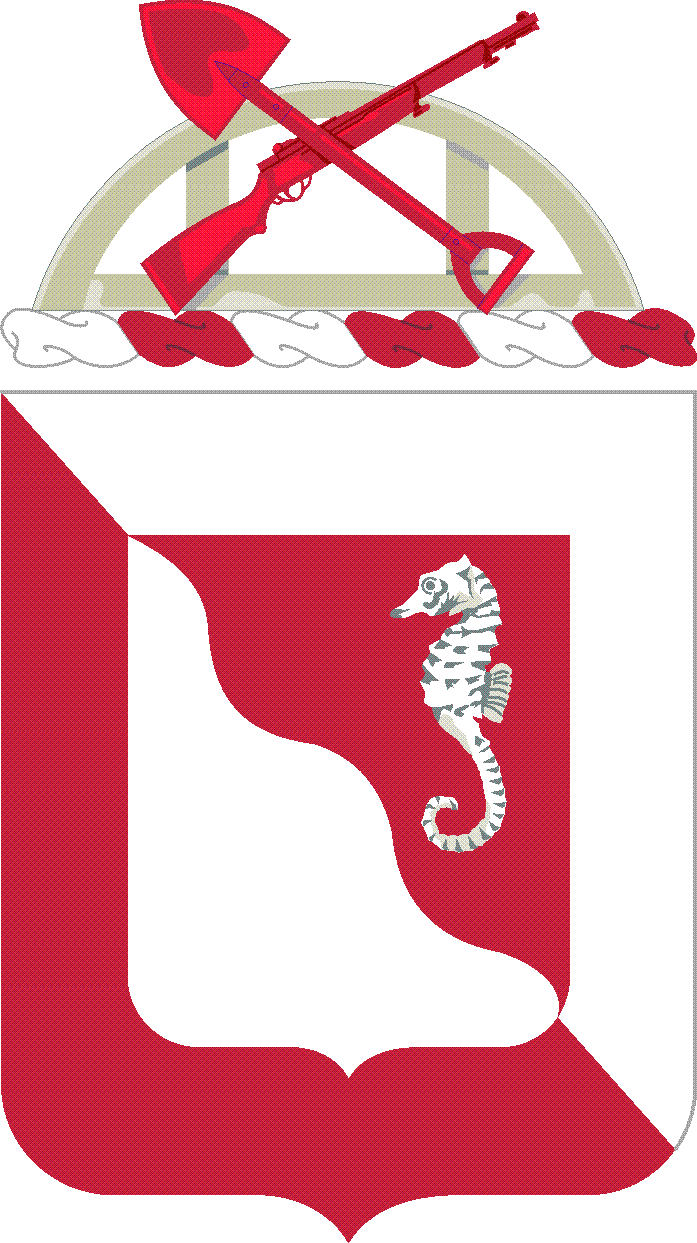
- Coat of Arms
- Active: February 1941 – Present
- Country: United States
- Branch: US Army Corps of Engineers
- Type: Battalion
- Role: Engineer Battalion (Combat Effects)
- Nickname: "The Rugged Battalion"

Insignia
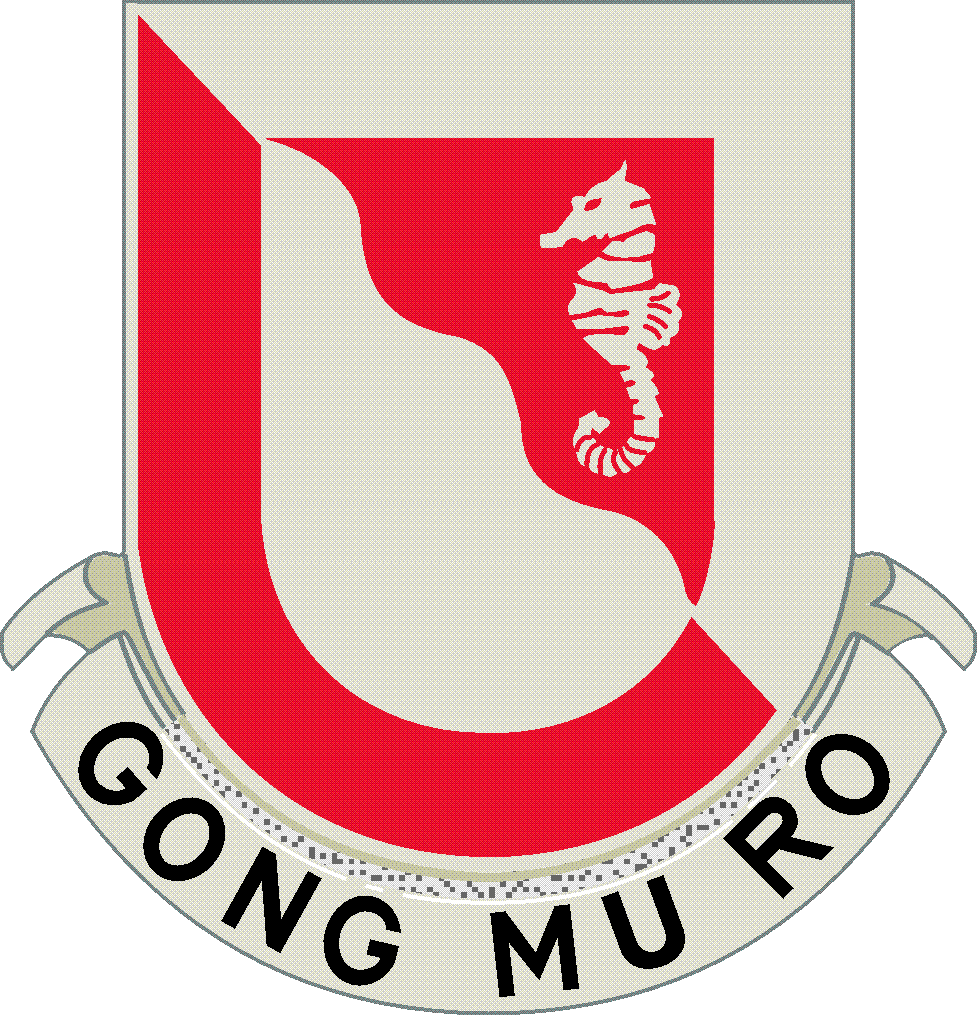
- Distinctive unit insignia

The 14th Brigade Engineer Battalion is a Combat Engineer Battalion of the United States Army based at Joint Base Lewis-McChord, Washington. The battalion is a subordinate unit of the 2nd Stryker Brigade, 2nd Infantry Division, and I Corps. The battalion's official motto is "Gong Mu Ro" (Korean for "Duty first") and battle cry "Rugged!"

== History ==
=== Activation through World War II ===
The 14th Brigade Engineer Battalion began as 2nd Battalion of the 36th Engineer Combat Regiment and was activated on 1 June 1941 at Plattsburgh Barracks, New York. The battalion fought in ten campaigns during World War II, including five amphibious beach assaults: Algeria/French, Morocco, Sicily, Naples, Anzio, and Southern France. The 36th Regiment's shoulder sleeve insignia included a sea horse, reflecting the unit's amphibious operations, and is still on the 14th Engineer distinctive unit insignia. In addition to numerous combat engineer missions, the battalion frequently fought as Infantry, including 47 continuous days at Anzio Beachhead.

On 15 February 1945 in Germany, the regiment was reorganized as the 36th Engineer Combat Group, and the 2nd Battalion was redesignated the 2827th Engineer Combat Battalion. The battalion was inactivated 25 February 1946 at Camp Kilmer, New Jersey.

The 2827th Engineer Combat Battalion was redesignated on 29 April 1947 as the 14th Engineer Combat Battalion, and activated 15 March 1950 in Kisarazu, Honshu, Japan, as part of the U.S. Army's post-war occupation forces.

=== Korean War ===
The 14th Combat Engineer Battalion landed in Korea on 18 July 1950. The battalion was awarded the Meritorious Unit Commendation (less Company A) for fighting as Infantry with the 25th Infantry Division (United States), and for its role in the breakout of the Pusan Perimeter. Alpha Company earned a Meritorious Unit Commendation for serving as Infantry in support of the 1st Cavalry Division (United States), and a Korean Presidential Unit Citation for minefield clearance operations. The battalion was again inactivated 25 June 1958 in Korea.

The 14th CBT EN BN was reactivated 17 June 1962 at Fort Bragg, North Carolina where it served until it was alerted for service in the Republic of Vietnam.

=== Vietnam War ===
The 14th Combat Engineer Battalion deployed to Vietnam on 19 October 1966, and participated in 12 campaigns from 1966 to 1971. The battalion earned another Meritorious Unit Commendation for its role in Operations Gatling and Summerall, and was also awarded the Republic of Vietnam Civil Actions Unit Citation. Additionally, 2nd Platoon, Alpha Company was awarded the Presidential Unit Citation while supporting 2nd Battalion, 7th Cavalry during operations in Bình Thuận Province. The battalion served with various units including the 1st Cavalry Division and the 101st Airborne Division. Volunteers from the battalion also hauled ammunition to surrounded U.S. Marines at Khe Sahn.

=== Cold War ===
The 14th Combat Engineer Battalion returned to the United States in August 1971. The battalion's new home became Fort Ord, California, where the battalion integrated both the mission and personnel of the 613th Engineer Battalion. On 3 February 1989, the 761st Chemical Company was assigned to the battalion, and deployed to Saudi Arabia the following year in support of Operations Desert Shield and Desert Storm, returning in April 1991. As a result of the U.S. Army's drawdown of the nineties and the closure of Fort Ord, the battalion moved to Fort Lewis in the summer of 1993. The 761st Chemical Company inactivated as a result of the drawdown.

In April 1999, Bravo Company was redesignated as a National Guard Unit still attached to the battalion, and on 16 July 1999, the 11th Chemical Company (reassigned from the closure of Fort McClellan) was assigned to the battalion. The 11th Chemical Co. relocated to Fort Lewis in November–December 1998 and in September 2004, was inactivated and removed from the 14th CBT EN BN order of battle.

=== Operation Iraqi Freedom ===
The 14th Combat Engineer Battalion deployed to Iraq in support of Operation Iraqi Freedom (OIF 1) with the 555th Engineer Brigade and the 4th Infantry Division (United States) from April 2003 to April 2004. During this time the battalion supported numerous missions and was most noted for starting Operation Trailblazer to search for and destroy improvised explosive devices (IEDs). The battalion received the Valorous Unit Award for its efforts. The 14th returned to Iraq a second time with the 555th Combat Support Brigade (Maneuver Enhancement) from November 2005 to October 2006 for OIF 05-07 to continue this mission using new state of the art armored route clearance equipment in support of the 101st Airborne Division and Multi-National Division North. The 122nd Engineer Company (South Carolina Army National Guard) was attached to the battalion to form Task Force Trailblazer. The 14th completed over 100 construction projects, cleared thousands of kilometers of road, and neutralized an astonishing number of over 700 IEDs. Encountering over 1000 counting detonations. The battalion received the Meritorious Unit Commendation and was awarded the Combat Action Battalion Streamer for 67% of Soldiers in the battalion earning the Combat Action Badge.

The Rugged Battalion transformed to a modular combat effects battalion in February 2007 and inactivated its Companies A and C. Its lettered companies were replaced with: 570th and 571st Sapper Companies, 22nd Clearance Company, and the 610th Engineer Support Company. A Forward Support Company (FSC) and Headquarters and Headquarters Company (HHC) are assigned to the battalion.

The battalion returned for its third and longest tour in Iraq for OIF 08-09 from 12 April 2008 – 1 July 2009 where it provided route clearance, construction, and Iraqi Army partnership throughout the country. It cleared over 140 IEDs, completed 122 troop construction projects, managed $34 million in Commanders Emergency Relief Projects to improve civil capacity, and trained elements of four Iraqi Field Engineer Regiments.

The battalion participated in every Iraqi campaign except New Dawn.

=== Operation Enduring Freedom ===
The battalion deployed to Afghanistan in July 2011 for its fourth combat tour in nine years. The battalion and all of its subordinate companies deployed to Regional Command South and Southwest to support U.S. Army, U.S. Marine Corps, and British Army units in Helmand and Kandahar provinces. The battalion also had operational control of U.S. Army route clearance units supporting Spanish and Italian Army units in Regional Command West. The unit's primary mission was again route clearance. The battalion removed over 600 IEDs from the battlefield during the tour.

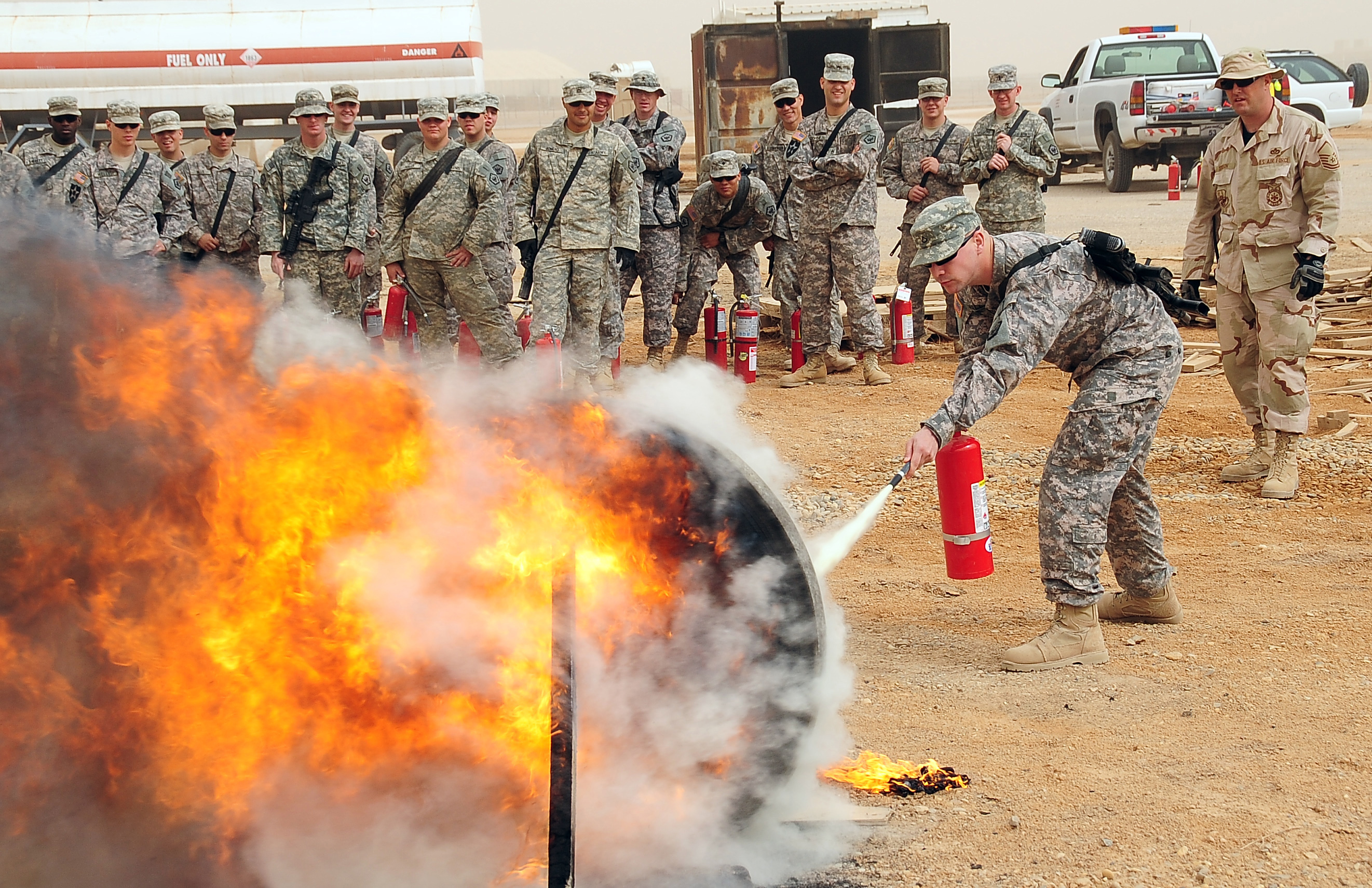
14th EN BN soldier conducting fire fighter training, Iraq, 2009.

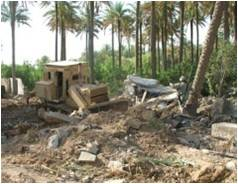
14th EN BN soldiers pushing through rubble for items of intelligence value, Iraq circa 2006.

== Lineage and honors ==
- Constituted 1 October 1933 in the Regular Army as the 2nd Battalion, 36th Engineers
- Activated 1 June 1941 at Plattsburg Barracks, New York
- Redesignated 1 August 1942 as the 2nd Battalion, 36th Engineer Combat Regiment
- Reorganized and redesignated 15 February 1945 as the 2827th Engineer Combat Battalion
- Inactivated 25 February 1946 at Camp Kilmer, New Jersey
- Redesignated 29 April 1947 as the 14th Engineer Combat Battalion
- Activated 15 March 1950 in Japan
- Reorganized and redesignated 15 March 1954 as the 14th Engineer Battalion
- Inactivated 25 June 1958 in Korea
- Activated 17 June 1962 at Fort Bragg, North Carolina
- Reorganized into 14th Brigade Engineer Battalion August 2014, Transferring to 2nd Brigade, 2nd Infantry Division.

== Organization ==
The unit is composed of:

- Headquarters & Headquarters Company
- Alpha Company "Ares Company"
- Bravo Company "Beast Company"
- Military Intelligence Company "Desperado Company"
- Signal Company "Chaos"
- Field Sustainment Company "Fury"
- Chemical Platoon

Campaign participation credit World War II

- Algeria-French Morocco (w/arrowhead)
- Tunisia
- Sicily (w/arrowhead)
- Naples-Foggia (w/arrowhead)
- Anzio (w/arrowhead)
- Rome-Arno
- Southern France (w/arrowhead)
- Rhineland
- Ardennes-Alsace
- Central Europe

Campaign participation credit Korean War

- UN Defensive
- UN Offensive
- CCF Intervention
- First UN Counteroffensive
- CCF Spring Offensive
- UN Summer-Fall Offensive
- Second Korean Winter
- Korea, Summer-Fall 1952
- Third Korean Winter
- Korea, Summer 1953

Campaign participation credit Vietnam War

- Counter Offensive
- Counter Offensive II
- Counter Offensive III
- Tet Counter Offensive
- Counter Offensive V
- Counter Offensive VI
- Tet 69 / Counter Offensive
- Summer-Fall 1969
- Winter-Spring 1970
- Sanctuary Counteroffensive
- Counteroffensive, VII

Campaign participation credit Operation Iraqi Freedom

- Liberation of Iraq
- Transition of Iraq
- Iraqi Governance
- National Resolution
- Iraqi Surge
- Iraqi Sovereignty

Campaign participation credit Operation Enduring Freedom

- Transition I

== Awards ==
- Meritorious Unit Commendation (Army) for Operation Enduring Freedom 2011–2012
- Meritorious Unit Commendation, Streamer embroidered (Army) for Operation Iraqi Freedom 2008–2009
- Combat Action Battalion Streamer, Streamer embroidered (Army) for 67% of soldiers in the battalion earning the Combat Action Badge, Operation Iraqi Freedom 2005–2006
- Meritorious Unit Commendation, Streamer embroidered (Army) for Operation Iraqi Freedom 2005–2006
- Valorous Unit Award, Streamer embroidered (Army) for forming Operation Trailblazer during Operation Iraqi Freedom 2003–2004
- Republic of Vietnam Civil Actions Unit Citation, First Class, Streamer embroidered for VIETNAM 1970–1971
- Meritorious Unit Commendation, Streamer embroidered (Army) for VIETNAM 1966–1967
- Presidential Unit Citation for 2nd Platoon, Alpha Company only for Heroism, VIETNAM 1966
- Korean Presidential Unit Citation for Alpha Company only for clearing minefields, KOREA 1950–1951
- Meritorious Unit Commendation (Army) for A Company only, KOREA 1950–1951
- Meritorious Unit Commendation, Streamer embroidered (Army) less Company A, KOREA 1950–1951
