= Military Intelligence Corps (United States Army) =

U.S. Army's branch for military intelligence

- Seal of the U.S. Army Military Intelligence Corps
- Active: 1863–present
- Country: United States
- Branch: United States Army
- Type: Military intelligence
- Garrison/HQ: Fort Huachuca, AZ
- Motto: Always Out Front
- March: "MI Corps March"
- Engagements: American Civil War; World War I; World War II; Korean War; Vietnam War; United States invasion of Panama; Gulf War; Operation Desert Storm; Operation Enduring Freedom; Iraq War

Commanders
- Chief (USAICoE): MG Richard T. Appelhans
- Command Sergeant Major (USAICoE): CSM Jesse M. Townsend
- Chief Warrant Officer (USAICoE): CW5 Peter Davis

Insignia
- Branch insignia

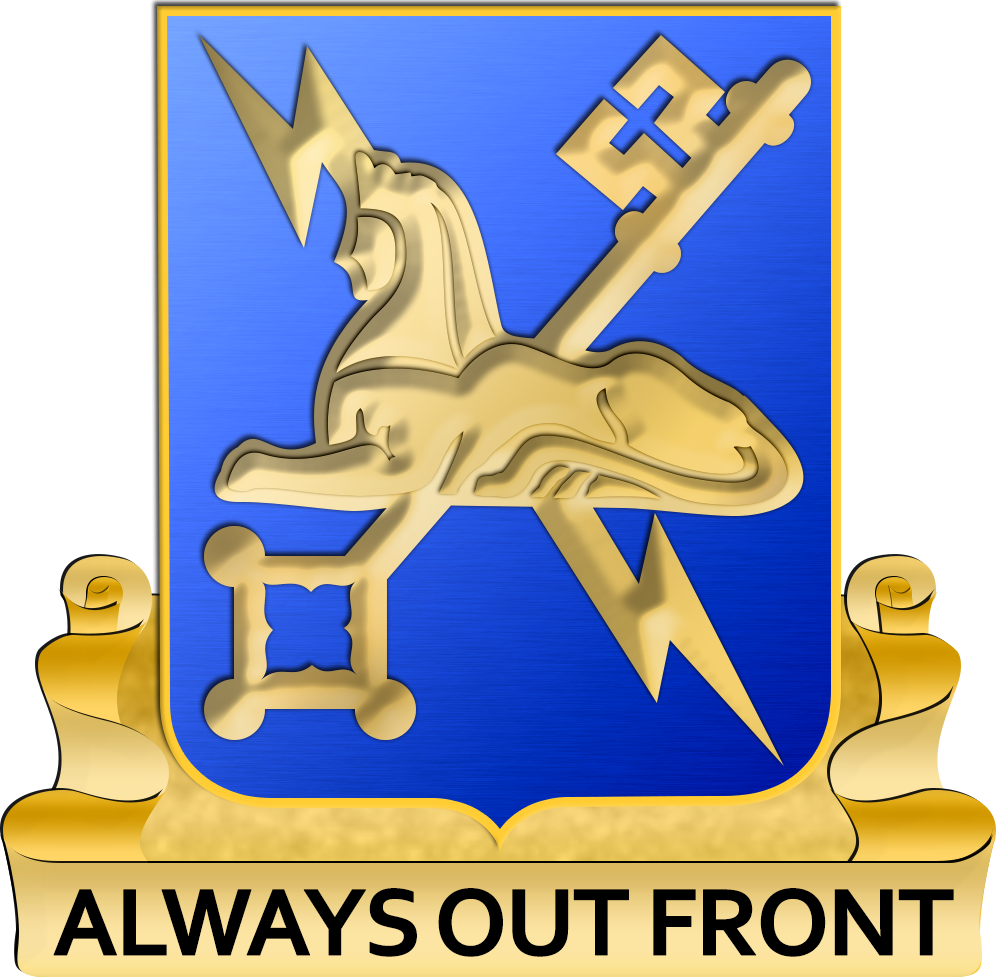
- Regimental insignia

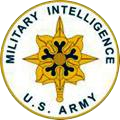
- Branch plaque

- Regimental coat of arms

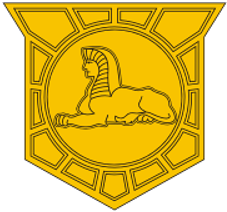
- Former branch insignia (1923–1962)

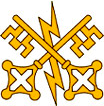
- Former Army Security Branch Insignia (Army Reserve) (1954–1967)

The Military Intelligence Corps is the intelligence branch of the United States Army. The primary mission of military intelligence in the U.S. Army is to provide timely, relevant, accurate, and synchronized intelligence and electronic warfare support to tactical, operational and strategic-level commanders. The Army's intelligence components produce intelligence both for Army use and for sharing across the national intelligence community.

== History ==
Intelligence personnel were a part of the Continental Army since its initial founding in 1776.

In 1776, General George Washington directed that a reconnaissance unit be created for the Continental Army. Knowlton's Rangers, named after its leader Colonel Thomas Knowlton, became the first organized elite force, a predecessor to modern special operations forces units such as the Army Rangers, Delta Force, and others. The "1776" on the United States Army Intelligence Service seal refers to the formation of Knowlton's Rangers.

In January 1863, Major General Joseph Hooker established the Bureau of Military Information for the Union Army during the Civil War, headed by George H. Sharpe. Allan Pinkerton and Lafayette C. Baker handled similar operations for their respective regional commanders. All of those operations were shut down at the end of the Civil War in 1865.

In 1885, the Army established the Military Intelligence Division. In 1903, it was placed under the new general staff in an elevated position.

In March 1942, the Military Intelligence Division was reorganized as the Military Intelligence Service. Originally consisting of just 26 people, 16 of them officers, it was quickly expanded to include 342 officers and 1,000 enlisted personnel and civilians. It was tasked with collecting, analyzing, and disseminating intelligence. Initially it included:

- an Administrative Group
- an Intelligence Group
- a Counter-intelligence Group
- an Operations Group
- a Language School

In May 1942, Alfred McCormack established the Special Branch of the Military Intelligence Service, which specialized in communications intelligence.

On 1 January 1942, the U.S. Army Corps of Intelligence Police, founded in World War I, was re-designated as the U.S. Army Counter Intelligence Corps. In 1945, the Special Branch became the Army Security Agency.

On June 19, 1942, the Military Intelligence Training Center at Camp Ritchie, Maryland, was formed. This group is now widely known as the Ritchie Boys and are credited with gathering over half of the actionable intelligence in the European Theatre. Most Ritchie Boys were fluent in European languages and could easily interrogate prisoners of war and civilians who knew vital information.

At its peak in early 1946, the MIS Language School had 160 instructors and 3,000 students studying in more than 125 classrooms, graduating more than 6,000 students by the end of the war. What began as an experimental military intelligence language-training program launched on a budget of $2,000 eventually became the forerunner of today's Defense Language Institute for the tens of thousands of linguists who serve American interests throughout the world.

The school moved to the Presidio of Monterey in 1946. Renamed the Army Language School, it expanded rapidly in 1947–48 during the Cold War. Instructors, including native speakers of more than thirty languages and dialects, were recruited from all over the world. Russian became the largest language program, followed by Chinese, Korean, and German.

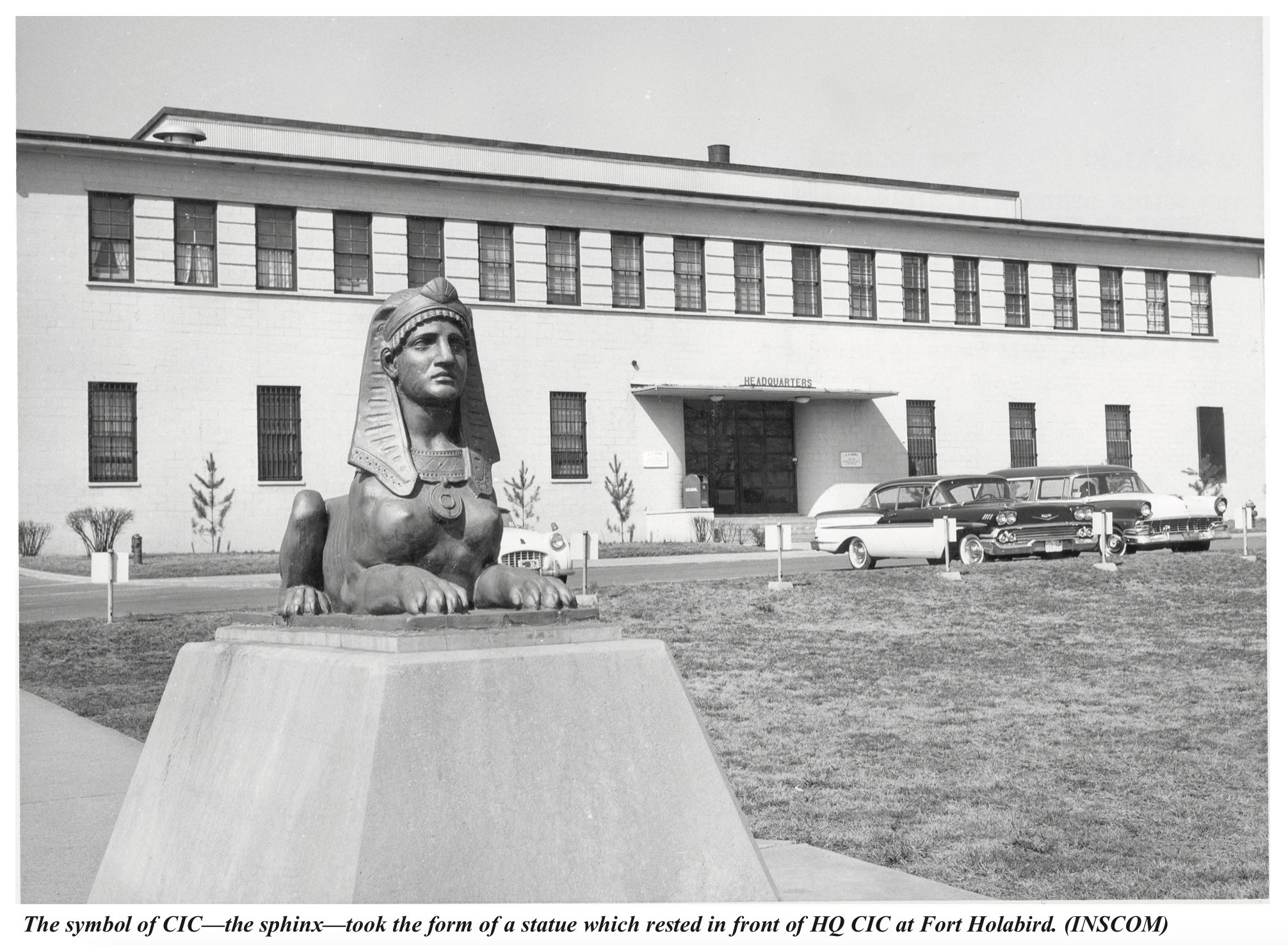
The sphinx stands guard in front of the former headquarters of the Counter Intelligence Corps at Fort Holabird

On 1 September 1954, the Assistant Chief of Staff for Intelligence (ACSI) officially redesignated the CIC Center, Fort Holabird, Maryland, as the United States Army Intelligence Center, and the Chief of the Counter Intelligence Corps became its Commanding General. The following year, the Intelligence Center expanded further with the addition of the Photo Interpretation Center. Additionally, combat intelligence training (including order of battle techniques, photo interpretation, prisoner of war interrogation, and censorship) was transferred from the Army General School at Fort Riley, Kansas, to Fort Holabird, giving the commanding general the additional title of commandant, U.S. Army Intelligence School. This arrangement centralized nearly all intelligence training at the U.S. Army Intelligence Center and School, Fort Holabird.

The Intelligence Center and School remained at Fort Holabird until overcrowding during the Vietnam War forced its relocation to Fort Huachuca, Arizona. Fort Huachuca became the "Home of Military Intelligence" on 23 March 1971, and the last class graduated from Fort Holabird on 2 September 1971, almost 17 years to the day after the Army Intelligence Center was established there. USAINTCS Established at Fort. Holabird, MD

On 1 July 1962, the Army Intelligence and Security Branch was established as a basic Army branch to meet the increased need for national and tactical intelligence. The redesignated branch came with the creation of a new dagger and sun branch insignia, replacing the sphinx insignia that had been in place since 1923.

A number of intelligence and security organizations were combined in July 1967 to form the military intelligence branch. In 1977, they recombined with the Army Intelligence Agency and Army Security Agency to become the U.S. Army Intelligence and Security Command.

On 1 July 1987, the Military Intelligence Corps was activated as a regiment under the U.S. Army Regimental System. All United States Army Military Intelligence personnel are members of the Military Intelligence Corps.

== Structure ==
Approximately 28,000 military personnel and 3,800 civilian personnel are assigned to intelligence duties, comprising the Military Intelligence Corps. Some of the key components include:

Name	Insignia	Function	Garrison
Office of the Deputy Chief of Staff, Intelligence (G-2)		As the Army's Chief Intelligence Officer, the responsibilities of the Deputy Chief of Staff for Intelligence include policy formulation, planning, programming, budgeting, management, staff supervision, evaluation, and oversight for intelligence activities, as well as overall coordination of the major intelligence disciplines.	Fort Belvoir
U.S. Army Intelligence and Security Command (INSCOM)		INSCOM is the U.S. Army's major intelligence command.	Fort Belvoir
U.S. Army Military Intelligence Readiness Command (MIRC)		MIRC is the U.S. Army Reserve's intelligence command.	Fort Belvoir
U.S. Army Intelligence Center of Excellence (USAICoE)		USAICoE is the U.S. Army's school for professional training of military intelligence personnel.	Fort Huachuca

=== Major military intelligence units ===
Name	Insignia	Supports	Garrison
58th Military Intelligence Brigade (Expeditionary) (Maryland Army National Guard): Headquarters and Headquarters Company; 110th Information Operations Battalion (Maryland Army National Guard); 629th Intelligence and Electronic Warfare Battalion (Maryland Army National Guard)		Maryland Army National Guard	Maryland
66th Military Intelligence Brigade: Headquarters and Headquarters Company; 2nd Military Intelligence Battalion; 24th Military Intelligence Battalion		United States Army Europe	Wiesbaden (Germany)
71st Military Intelligence Brigade (Expeditionary) (Texas Army National Guard): Headquarters & Headquarters Company; 250th Military Intelligence Battalion (California Army National Guard); 636th Military Intelligence Battalion (Texas Army National Guard)		Texas Army National Guard	Texas
111th Military Intelligence Brigade: Headquarters & Headquarters Company; 304th Military Intelligence Battalion; 305th Military Intelligence Battalion; 309th Military Intelligence Battalion; 344th Military Intelligence Battalion		Army Intelligence Center	Fort Huachuca (AZ)
116th Military Intelligence Brigade (Aerial Intelligence): Headquarters & Headquarters Company; 15th Military Intelligence Battalion (Aerial Exploitation), at Fort Hood (TX); 204th Military Intelligence Battalion (Aerial Exploitation), at Fort Bliss (TX); 206th Military Intelligence Battalion (Aerial Exploitation), at Fort Hood (TX); 224th Military Intelligence Battalion (Aerial Exploitation), at Hunter Army Airfield (GA); 138th Military Intelligence Company (JSTARS-Army element), at Robins Air Force Base (TX); DCGS-Army Operations and Exploitation Unit		Army Intelligence and Security Command	Fort Hood (TX)
201st Military Intelligence Brigade (Expeditionary): Headquarters and Headquarters Company; 109th Military Intelligence Battalion; 502nd Military Intelligence Battalion		I Corps	Joint Base Lewis–McChord (WA)
207th Military Intelligence Brigade (Theater): Headquarters & Headquarters Company; 307th Military Intelligence Battalion; 522nd Military Intelligence Battalion		United States Army Africa	Vicenza (Italy)
259th Military Intelligence Brigade (Expeditionary) (Army Reserve): Headquarters & Headquarters Company; 301st Military Intelligence Battalion (Theater Support), in Phoenix (AZ); 321st Military Intelligence Battalion (General Support), in Orlando (FL); 368th Military Intelligence Battalion (Theater Support), at Camp Parks (CA); 373rd Military Intelligence Battalion (General Support), at Joint Base Lewis–McChord (WA)		Military Intelligence Readiness Command	Joint Base Lewis–McChord (WA)
300th Military Intelligence Brigade (Linguist) (Utah Army National Guard): Headquarters & Headquarters Company; 141st Military Intelligence Battalion (Linguist) (Utah Army National Guard); 142nd Military Intelligence Battalion (Linguist) (Utah Army National Guard); 223rd Military Intelligence Battalion (Linguist) (California Army National Guard); 260th Military Intelligence Battalion (Linguist) (Florida Army National Guard); 341st Military Intelligence Battalion (Linguist) (Washington Army National Guard)		Army Intelligence and Security Command	Draper (UT)
336th Military Intelligence Brigade (Expeditionary) (Army Reserve): Headquarters & Headquarters Company; 323rd Military Intelligence Battalion (Theater Support), at Fort Meade (MD); 325th Military Intelligence Battalion (General Support), at Fort Devens (MA); 337th Military Intelligence Battalion (Theater Support), at Fort Sheridan (IL); 345th Military Intelligence Battalion (Theater Support), at Fort Gordon (GA); 378th Military Intelligence Battalion (General Support), in Blackwood (NJ)		Military Intelligence Readiness Command	Joint Base McGuire–Dix–Lakehurst (NJ)
470th Military Intelligence Brigade: Headquarters & Headquarters Company; 312th Military Intelligence Battalion; 717th Military Intelligence Battalion		United States Army South	Joint Base San Antonio (TX)
500th Military Intelligence Brigade: Headquarters & Headquarters Company; 205th Military Intelligence Battalion; 311th Military Intelligence Battalion; 715th Military Intelligence Battalion		United States Army Pacific	Schofield Barracks (HI)
501st Military Intelligence Brigade: Headquarters & Headquarters Company; 3rd Military Intelligence Battalion; 524th Military Intelligence Battalion; 532nd Military Intelligence Battalion; 719th Military Intelligence Battalion		Eighth United States Army	Camp Humphreys (South Korea)
504th Military Intelligence Brigade: Headquarters and Headquarters Company; 163rd Military Intelligence Battalion; 303rd Military Intelligence Battalion		III Armored Corps	Fort Hood (TX)
505th Military Intelligence Brigade (Theater) (Army Reserve): Headquarters & Headquarters Company; 377th Military Intelligence Battalion (Theater Support), in Austin (TX); 383rd Military Intelligence Battalion (Theater Support), in Kansas City (MO); 549th Military Intelligence Battalion (Operations), at Camp Bullis (TX)		Military Intelligence Readiness Command	Camp Bullis (TX)
513th Military Intelligence Brigade: Headquarters & Headquarters Company; 202nd Military Intelligence Battalion; 297th Military Intelligence Battalion		United States Army Central	Fort Gordon (GA)
525th Military Intelligence Brigade: Headquarters and Headquarters Company; 319th Military Intelligence Battalion; 519th Military Intelligence Battalion		XVIII Airborne Corps	Fort Bragg (NC)
648th Regional Support Group (Army Reserve): Reserve Element — AFRICOM Joint Intelligence Operations Center, at Fort Meade (MD); Reserve Element — CENTCOM Joint Intelligence Center, in Tampa (FL); Reserve Element — EUCOM Joint Analysis Center, at Fort Gillem (GA); Reserve Element — INDOPACOM Joint Intelligence Operations Center, in Aurora (CO)		Military Intelligence Readiness Command	Granite City (IL)
650th Military Intelligence Group: Headquarters & Headquarters Company; Region I, AFSOUTH; Region II, AFNORTH; Region IV, AFCENT; Region V, SHAPE		Supreme Headquarters Allied Powers Europe	Mons (Belgium)
704th Military Intelligence Brigade: Headquarters & Headquarters Company; 741st Military Intelligence Battalion; 742nd Military Intelligence Battalion; 743rd Military Intelligence Battalion		National Security Agency	Fort Meade (MD)
706th Military Intelligence Group: Headquarters & Headquarters Company; 707th Military Intelligence Battalion		Central Security Service	Fort Gordon (GA)
780th Military Intelligence Brigade: Headquarters & Headquarters Company; 781st Military Intelligence Battalion; 782nd Military Intelligence Battalion; 11th Cyber Battalion		Army Cyber Command	Fort Meade (MD)
902nd Military Intelligence Group: Headquarters & Headquarters Detachment; 308th Military Intelligence Battalion; 310th Military Intelligence Battalion; Army Counterintelligence Center; Army Operations Security Detachment		Army Intelligence and Security Command	Fort Meade (MD)
Defense Language Institute Foreign Language Center: Defense Language Institute–Army element; 229th Military Intelligence Battalion		Army Training and Doctrine Command	Presidio of Monterey (CA)
National Ground Intelligence Center: Headquarters & Headquarters Company; Army Geospatial Intelligence Battalion, at Fort Belvoir (VA)		Army Intelligence and Security Command	Charlottesville (VA)
Army Reserve Interrogation Group (Army Reserve): 314th Military Intelligence Battalion (Interrogation), in Fallbrook (CA); 338th Military Intelligence Battalion (Interrogation), at Joint Base San Antonio (TX); 372nd Military Intelligence Battalion (Interrogation), in Cincinnati (OH); 415th Military Intelligence Battalion (Interrogation) (Louisiana Army National Guard); 752nd Military Intelligence Battalion (Counterintelligence), at Fort Meade (MD); 826th Military Intelligence Battalion (Interrogation), at Fort Devens (MA); US Army Reserve Operational Group, at Camp Bullis (TX)		Military Intelligence Readiness Command	Joint Base McGuire–Dix–Lakehurst (NJ)
National Intelligence Support Group (Army Reserve): 2100th Military Intelligence Group, at Wright-Patterson Air Force Base (OH); 2200th Military Intelligence Group, at Fort Devens (MA); 2300th Military Intelligence Group, in Charlottesville (VA); 2500th Military Intelligence Group, in Jacksonville (FL); 3100th Strategic Intelligence Group, at Fort Belvoir (VA); 3200th Strategic Intelligence Group, at Fort Belvoir (VA); 3300th Strategic Intelligence Group, at Fort Belvoir (VA); Reserve Element — NSA, Central Security Service, at Fort Gordon (GA); Reserve Element — NSA, Central Security Service, at Fort Sheridan (IL); Reserve Element — NSA, Central Security Service, at Camp Bullis (TX); Reserve Element — NSA, Central Security Service, in Garden Grove (CA); Reserve Element — NSA, Central Security Service, at Joint Base Lewis–McChord (WA); US Army Reserve Technical Control And Analysis Element, at Fort Meade (MD)		Military Intelligence Readiness Command	Fort Belvoir (VA)
Army Reserve Military Intelligence Training Support Command (Army Reserve): 203rd Military Intelligence Battalion (Technical Intelligence), at Aberdeen Proving Ground (MD); NE Army Reserve Intelligence Support Center (NEARISC), at Joint Base McGuire–Dix–Lakehurst (NJ); SE Army Reserve Intelligence Support Center (SEARISC), at Fort Gillem (GA); NC Army Reserve Intelligence Support Center (NCARISC), at Fort Sheridan (IL); SW Army Reserve Intelligence Support Center (SWARISC), at Camp Bullis (TX); W Army Reserve Intelligence Support Center (WARISC), at Camp Parks (CA)		Military Intelligence Readiness Command	Fort Belvoir (VA)

== Museum ==
The United States Army Intelligence Museum is located at Fort Huachuca, Arizona. It features the history of American military intelligence from the Revolutionary War to present. In the Army Military Intelligence Museum there is a painting of "The MI Blue Rose". The back of this painting indicates Sgt. Ralph R Abel, Jr. created it. The painting was photographed and distributed worldwide. Sgt. Abel also painted a replica of the corps flag.

== List of Deputy Chiefs of Staff for Intelligence, G-2 ==
The title of Deputy Chief of Staff for Intelligence, G-2 appeared in 1985. Prior to 1985, this office was known as Chief, Military Intelligence Division (1917–1920), Assistant Chief of Staff, G-2 (1920–1945, 1948–1985), and Director of Intelligence (1946–1948).

No.	Deputy Chief of Staff		Term		
No.	Portrait	Name	Took office	Left office	Term length
1	Ralph H. Van Deman	Colonel; Ralph H. Van Deman	June 1918	August 1920	~2 years, 61 days
2	Marlborough Churchill	Brigadier General; Marlborough Churchill	June 1918	August 1920	~2 years, 61 days
3	Dennis E. Nolan	Brigadier General; Dennis E. Nolan	September 1920	September 1921	~1 year, 0 days
4	Stuart Heintzelman	Brigadier General; Stuart Heintzelman	September 1921	November 1922	~1 year, 61 days
5	William K. Naylor	Colonel; William K. Naylor	November 1922	June 1924	~1 year, 213 days
6	James H. Reeves	Colonel; James H. Reeves	July 1924	April 1927	~2 years, 274 days
7	Stanley H. Ford	Colonel; Stanley H. Ford	May 1927	September 1930	~3 years, 123 days
8	Alfred T. Smith	Brigadier General; Alfred T. Smith	January 1931	January 1935	~4 years, 0 days
9	Harry E. Knight	Brigadier General; Harry E. Knight	February 1935	November 1935	~273 days
10	Frances H. Lincoln	Colonel; Frances H. Lincoln	November 1935	June 1937	~1 year, 212 days
11	R. Warner McCabe	Colonel; R. Warner McCabe	July 1937	February 1940	~2 years, 215 days
12	Sherman Miles	Brigadier General; Sherman Miles	April 1940	December 1941	~1 year, 244 days
13	Raymond E. Lee	Brigadier General; Raymond E. Lee	December 1941	March 1942	~90 days
14	George V. Strong	Major General; George V. Strong	May 1942	February 1944	~1 year, 276 days
15	Clayton Bissell	Major General; Clayton Bissell	February 1944	January 1946	~1 year, 334 days
16	Hoyt Vandenberg	Lieutenant General; Hoyt Vandenberg	January 1946	June 1946	~151 days
17	Stephen J. Chamberlin	Lieutenant General; Stephen J. Chamberlin	June 1946	October 1948	~2 years, 122 days
18	Stafford L. Irwin	Major General; Stafford L. Irwin	November 1948	August 1950	~1 year, 273 days
19	Alexander R. Bolling	Major General; Alexander R. Bolling	August 1950	August 1952	~2 years, 0 days
20	Richard C. Partridge	Major General; Richard C. Partridge	August 1952	November 1953	~3 years, 92 days
21	Arthur G. Trudeau	Major General; Arthur G. Trudeau	November 1953	August 1955	~1 year, 273 days
22	Ridgely Gaither	Major General; Ridgely Gaither	August 1955	July 1956	~335 days
23	Robert A. Schow	Major General; Robert A. Schow	August 1956	October 1958	~2 years, 61 days
24	John M. Willems	Major General; John M. Willems	November 1958	October 1961	~2 years, 334 days
25	Alva R. Fitch	Major General; Alva R. Fitch	October 1961	January 1964	~2 years, 92 days
26	Edgar C. Doleman	Major General; Edgar C. Doleman	January 1964	February 1965	~1 year, 31 days
27	Charles J. Denholm (acting)	Brigadier General; Charles J. Denholm (acting)	February 1965	September 1965	~211 days
28	John J. Davis	Major General; John J. Davis	September 1965	October 1966	~1 year, 30 days
29	Chester L. Johnson (acting)	Brigadier General; Chester L. Johnson (acting)	October 1966	December 1966	~61 days
30	William P. Yarborough	Major General; William P. Yarborough	December 1966	July 1968	~1 year, 213 days
31	Joseph A. McChristian	Major General; Joseph A. McChristian	August 1968	April 1971	~2 years, 243 days
32	Philip B. Davidson Jr.	Major General; Philip B. Davidson Jr.	May 1971	September 1972	~1 year, 123 days
33	William E. Potts	Major General; William E. Potts	September 1972	July 1973	~303 days
34	Harold R. Aaron	Major General; Harold R. Aaron	November 1973	August 1977	~3 years, 273 days
35	Edmund R. Thompson	Major General; Edmund R. Thompson	August 1977	November 1981	~4 years, 92 days
36	William E. Odom	Major General; William E. Odom	November 1981	May 1985	~3 years, 181 days
37	Sidney T. Weinstein	Lieutenant General; Sidney T. Weinstein	August 1985	September 1989	~4 years, 31 days
38	Charles B. Eichelberger	Lieutenant General; Charles B. Eichelberger	November 1989	September 1991	~1 year, 304 days
39	Ira C. Owens	Lieutenant General; Ira C. Owens	October 1991	February 1995	~3 years, 123 days
40	Paul E. Menoher	Lieutenant General; Paul E. Menoher	February 1995	February 1997	~2 years, 0 days
41	Claudia J. Kennedy	Lieutenant General; Claudia J. Kennedy	May 1997	July 2000	~3 years, 61 days
42	Robert W. Noonan	Lieutenant General; Robert W. Noonan	July 2000	July 2003	~3 years, 0 days
43	Keith B. Alexander	Lieutenant General; Keith B. Alexander (born 1951)	July 2003	July 2005	~2 years, 0 days
44	John Kimmons	Lieutenant General; John Kimmons	August 2005	February 2009	~3 years, 184 days
45	Richard P. Zahner	Lieutenant General; Richard P. Zahner	February 2009	12 April 2012	~3 years, 71 days
46	Mary A. Legere	Lieutenant General; Mary A. Legere	12 April 2012	2016	~3 years, 264 days
47	Robert P. Ashley Jr.	Lieutenant General; Robert P. Ashley Jr.	2016	~3 October 2017	~1 year, 275 days
48	Scott D. Berrier	Lieutenant General; Scott D. Berrier	30 January 2018	14 September 2020	2 years, 228 days
49	Laura A. Potter	Lieutenant General; Laura A. Potter	14 September 2020	5 January 2024	3 years, 113 days
50	Anthony R. Hale	Lieutenant General; Anthony R. Hale	5 January 2024	5 December 2025	1 year, 334 days
51	Michelle A. Schmidt	Lieutenant General; Michelle A. Schmidt	5 December 2025	Incumbent	318 days

== See also ==
- Combat Support
- Company Level Intelligence Cell
- G-2 (intelligence)
- Military Intelligence Corps careers
- Military Intelligence Corps Band
- Office of Naval Intelligence
- Sixteenth Air Force
- United States Army Counterintelligence
