= Military Intelligence Readiness Command =

Functional command of the U.S. Army Reserve Command

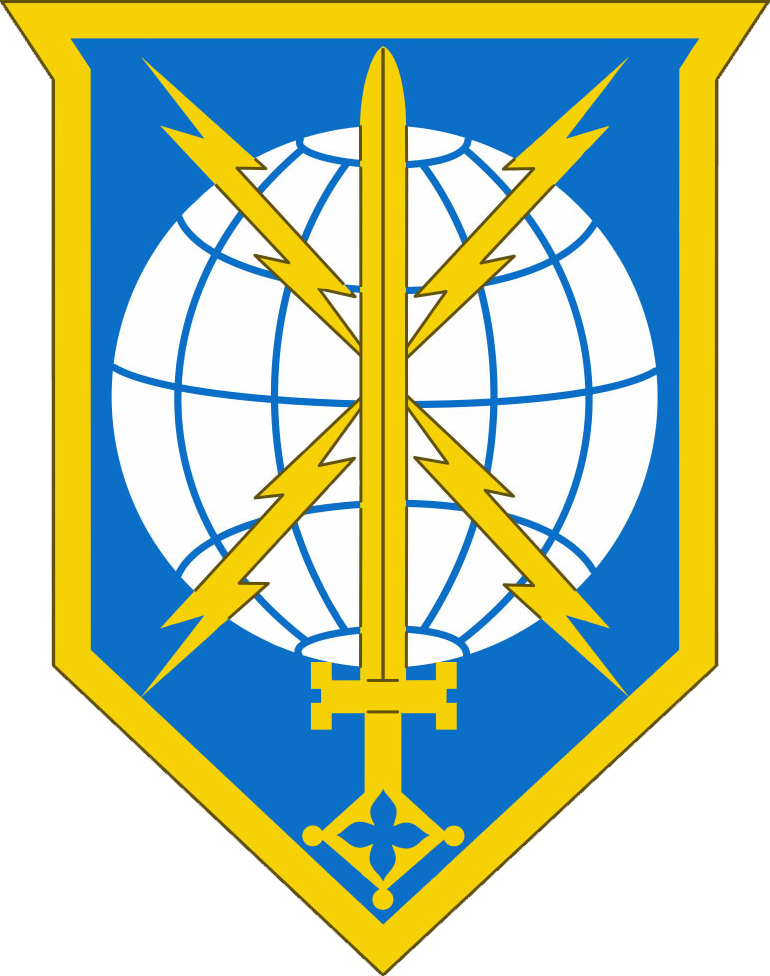
- MIRC's shoulder sleeve insignia
- Active: 2004–Present
- Country: United States
- Branch: United States Army Reserve
- Role: Military Intelligence
- Size: 7,500
- Part of: United States Army Reserve Command
- Headquarters: Fort Belvoir, Virginia
- Nickname: MIRC
- Motto: Always Engaged
- Colors: Oriental Blue and Silver Gray
- Website: Command website

Commanders
- Current commander: BG Ryan Gunst
- Deputy Commander: COL Christopher A. Nagelvoort
- Command Chief Warrant Officer: CW5 William J. Davis
- Command Sergeant Major: CSM R. Travis Ransom
- Command Executive Officer: James R. Holloway

Insignia
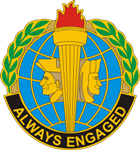
- Command Distinctive Unit Insignia

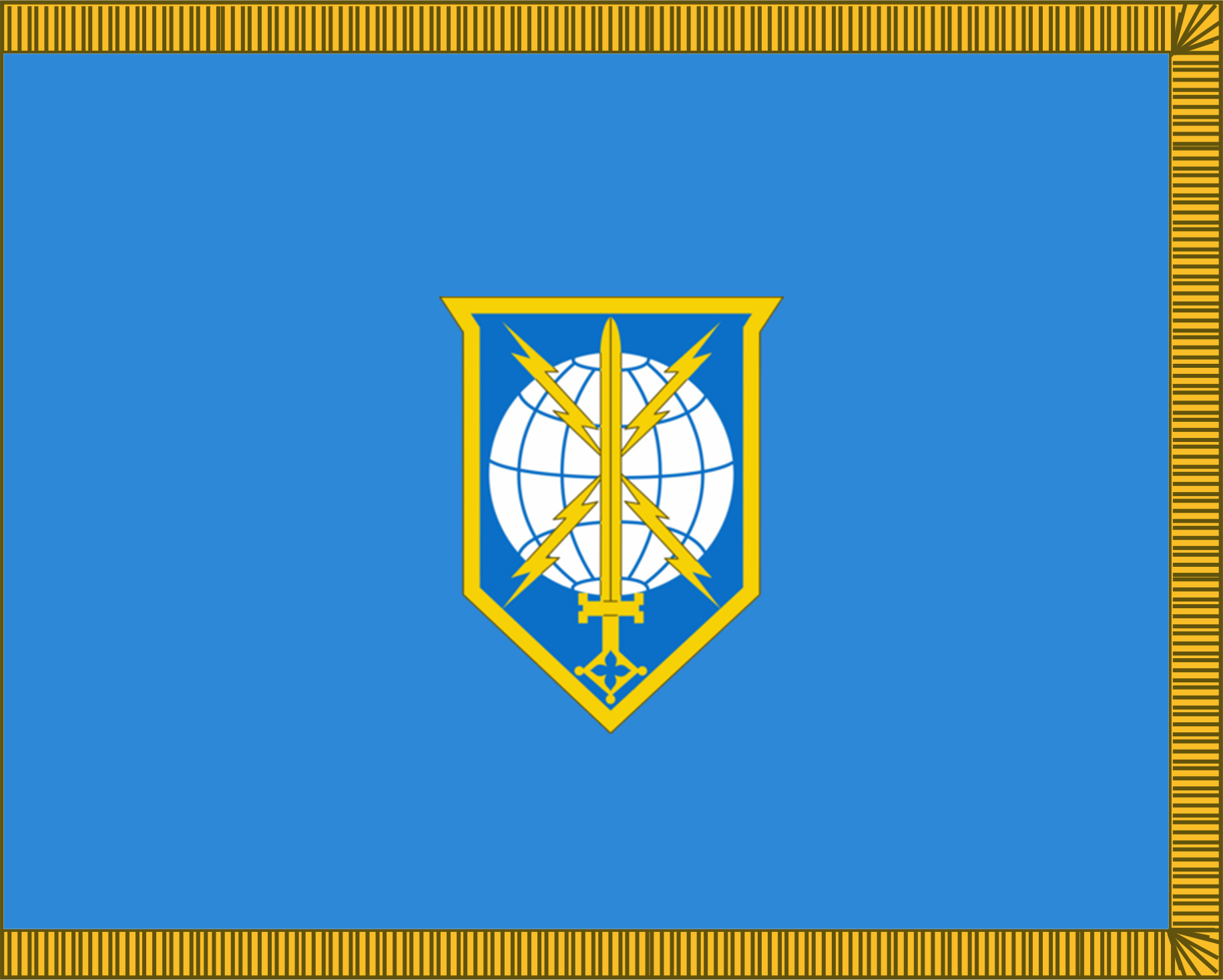
- Military Intelligence Readiness Command Flag

The United States Army Military Intelligence Readiness Command (MIRC, The MIRC, formally USAMIRC) was stood up as the first Army Reserve functional command in 2005. Headquartered at Fort Belvoir, Virginia, MIRC is composed mostly of reserve soldiers in units throughout the United States, and encompasses the bulk of Army Military Intelligence reserve units, consisting of over 40 strategic and tactical intelligence units throughout the United States. Specialized capabilities that MIRC provides include theater intelligence support, support to NSA and INSCOM, and strategic intelligence support to Combatant Commands and combat support agencies. MIRC is subordinate to United States Army Reserve Command. MIRC’s commander is Brigadier General Melissa K.G. Adamski, who departed the role of MIRC Training Support Command commander, 3 June 2023.

The MIRC headquarters is located in the SSG Richard S. Eaton Jr. U.S. Army Reserve center on Fort Belvoir, Virginia.

== Organization ==
The Military Intelligence Readiness Command is a subordinate functional command of the United States Army Reserve Command. As of January 2026 the command consists of the following units:

- Military Intelligence Readiness Command, at Fort Belvoir (VA)
  - Headquarters and Headquarters Detachment, at Fort Belvoir (VA)
  - 259th Military Intelligence Brigade (Expeditionary), at Joint Base Lewis–McChord (WA)
    - Headquarters and Headquarters Company, at Joint Base Lewis–McChord (WA)
    - 301st Military Intelligence Battalion (Theater Support), in Phoenix (AZ) (aligned with US Army Pacific's 500th Military Intelligence Brigade)
      - Headquarters and Headquarters Company, in Phoenix (AZ)
      - Alpha Company, 301st Military Intelligence Battalion (Theater Support), in Phoenix (AZ)
      - Bravo Company, 301st Military Intelligence Battalion (Theater Support), at Fort Shafter (HI)
      - Charlie Company, 301st Military Intelligence Battalion (Theater Support), in Phoenix (AZ)
    - 321st Military Intelligence Battalion (General Support), in Orlando (FL)
      - Headquarters and Headquarters Company, in Orlando (FL)
      - Alpha Company, 321st Military Intelligence Battalion (General Support), in Orlando (FL)
      - Bravo Company, 321st Military Intelligence Battalion (General Support), in Orlando (FL)
    - 368th Military Intelligence Battalion (Theater Support), at Camp Parks (CA) (aligned with Eighth Army's 501st Military Intelligence Brigade)
      - Headquarters and Headquarters Company, at Camp Parks (CA)
      - Alpha Company, 368th Military Intelligence Battalion (Theater Support), at Camp Parks (CA)
      - Bravo Company, 368th Military Intelligence Battalion (Theater Support), at Camp Parks (CA)
      - Charlie Company, 368th Military Intelligence Battalion (Theater Support), at Camp Parks (CA)
    - 373rd Military Intelligence Battalion (General Support), at Joint Base Lewis–McChord (WA)
      - Headquarters and Headquarters Company, at Joint Base Lewis–McChord (WA)
      - Alpha Company, 373rd Military Intelligence Battalion (General Support), at Joint Base Lewis–McChord (WA)
      - Bravo Company, 373rd Military Intelligence Battalion (General Support), at Joint Base Lewis–McChord (WA)
  - 336th Military Intelligence Brigade (Expeditionary), at Joint Base McGuire–Dix–Lakehurst (NJ)
    - Headquarters and Headquarters Company, at Joint Base McGuire–Dix–Lakehurst (NJ)
    - 323rd Military Intelligence Battalion (Theater Support), at Fort Meade (MD) (aligned with US Army Europe's 66th Military Intelligence Brigade)
      - Headquarters and Headquarters Company, at Fort Meade (MD)
      - Alpha Company, 323rd Military Intelligence Battalion (Theater Support), at Fort Meade (MD)
      - Bravo Company, 323rd Military Intelligence Battalion (Theater Support), at Fort Meade (MD)
      - Charlie Company, 323rd Military Intelligence Battalion (Theater Support), at Fort Meade (MD)
    - 325th Military Intelligence Battalion (General Support), at Fort Devens (MA)
      - Headquarters and Headquarters Company, at Fort Devens (MA)
      - Alpha Company, 325th Military Intelligence Battalion (General Support), at Fort Totten (NY)
      - Bravo Company, 325th Military Intelligence Battalion (General Support), at Fort Devens (MA)
    - 337th Military Intelligence Battalion (Theater Support), at Fort Sheridan (IL) (aligned with US Army Africa's 207th Military Intelligence Brigade)
      - Headquarters and Headquarters Company, at Fort Sheridan (IL)
      - Alpha Company, 337th Military Intelligence Battalion (Theater Support), in Lake Forest (IL)
      - Bravo Company, 337th Military Intelligence Battalion (Theater Support), at Fort Snelling (MN)
      - Charlie Company, 337th Military Intelligence Battalion (Theater Support), in Milwaukee (WI)
    - 345th Military Intelligence Battalion (Theater Support), at Fort Gordon (GA) (aligned with US Army Central's 513th Military Intelligence Brigade)
      - Headquarters and Headquarters Company, at Fort Gordon (GA)
      - Alpha Company, 345th Military Intelligence Battalion (Theater Support), at Fort Gordon (GA)
      - Bravo Company, 345th Military Intelligence Battalion (Theater Support), at Fort Gillem (GA)
      - Charlie Company, 345th Military Intelligence Battalion (Theater Support), at Fort Gillem (GA)
    - 378th Military Intelligence Battalion (General Support), in Blackwood (NJ)
      - Headquarters and Headquarters Company, in Blackwood (NJ)
      - Alpha Company, 378th Military Intelligence Battalion (General Support), at Biddle Air National Guard Base (PA)
      - Bravo Company, 378th Military Intelligence Battalion (General Support), at Joint Base McGuire–Dix–Lakehurst (NJ)
  - 505th Military Intelligence Brigade (Theater), at Camp Bullis (TX)
    - Headquarters and Headquarters Company, at Camp Bullis (TX)
    - 377th Military Intelligence Battalion (Theater Support), in Austin (TX) (aligned with US Army South's 470th Military Intelligence Brigade)
      - Headquarters and Headquarters Company, in Austin (TX)
      - Alpha Company, 377th Military Intelligence Battalion (Theater Support), at Camp Bullis (TX)
      - Bravo Company, 377th Military Intelligence Battalion (Theater Support), in Miami (FL)
      - Charlie Company, 377th Military Intelligence Battalion (Theater Support), at Naval Air Station Joint Reserve Base Fort Worth (TX)
    - 383rd Military Intelligence Battalion (Theater Support), in Kansas City (MO) (supports US Army North)
      - Headquarters and Headquarters Company, in Kansas City (MO)
      - Alpha Company, 383rd Military Intelligence Battalion (Theater Support), at Fort Leavenworth (KS)
      - Bravo Company, 383rd Military Intelligence Battalion (Theater Support), at New Century AirCenter (KS)
      - Charlie Company, 383rd Military Intelligence Battalion (Theater Support), in Belton (MO)
    - 549th Military Intelligence Battalion (Operations), at Camp Bullis (TX)
      - Headquarters and Headquarters Company, at Camp Bullis (TX)
      - Alpha Company, 549th Military Intelligence Battalion (Operations), at Camp Bullis (TX)
      - Bravo Company, 549th Military Intelligence Battalion (Operations), at Camp Bullis (TX)
  - US Army Reserve Interrogation Group, at Joint Base McGuire–Dix–Lakehurst (NJ)
    - US Army Reserve Operational Group, at Camp Bullis (TX)
    - 314th Military Intelligence Battalion (Interrogation), in Fallbrook (CA)
      - Headquarters and Headquarters Company, in Fallbrook (CA)
      - Alpha Company, 314th Military Intelligence Battalion (Interrogation), in Bell (CA)
      - Bravo Company, 314th Military Intelligence Battalion (Interrogation), in San Diego (CA)
    - 338th Military Intelligence Battalion (Interrogation), at Joint Base San Antonio (TX)
      - Headquarters and Headquarters Company, at Joint Base San Antonio (TX)
      - Alpha Company, 338th Military Intelligence Battalion (Interrogation), in Round Rock (TX)
      - Bravo Company, 338th Military Intelligence Battalion (Interrogation), in Austin (TX)
    - 372nd Military Intelligence Battalion (Interrogation), in Cincinnati (OH)
      - Headquarters and Headquarters Company, in Cincinnati (OH)
      - Alpha Company, 372nd Military Intelligence Battalion (Interrogation), in Fraser (MI)
      - Bravo Company, 372nd Military Intelligence Battalion (Interrogation), in Cincinnati (OH)
    - 752nd Military Intelligence Battalion (Counterintelligence), at Fort Meade (MD) (aligned with Army Intelligence and Security Command's 902nd Military Intelligence Group)
      - Headquarters and Headquarters Company, at Fort Meade (MD)
      - Detachment 1 (Alpha Company), 752nd Military Intelligence Battalion (Counterintelligence), at Fort Meade (MD)
      - Detachment 2 (Bravo Company), 752nd Military Intelligence Battalion (Counterintelligence), in Augusta (GA)
      - Detachment 3 (Charlie Company), 752nd Military Intelligence Battalion (Counterintelligence), in Austin (TX)
      - Detachment 4 (Delta Company), 752nd Military Intelligence Battalion (Counterintelligence), in Bell (CA)
    - 826th Military Intelligence Battalion (Interrogation), at Fort Devens (MA)
      - Headquarters and Headquarters Company, at Fort Devens (MA)
      - Alpha Company, 826th Military Intelligence Battalion (Interrogation), Fort Devens (MA)
      - Bravo Company, 826th Military Intelligence Battalion (Interrogation), Fort Devens (MA)
  - National Intelligence Support Group, at Fort Belvoir (VA)
    - 2100th Military Intelligence Group (supporting the National Air and Space Intelligence Center), at Wright-Patterson Air Force Base (OH)
      - Detachment 1, 2100th Military Intelligence Group, at Wright-Patterson Air Force Base (OH)
      - Detachment 2, 2100th Military Intelligence Group, in Sharonville (OH)
      - Detachment 3, 2100th Military Intelligence Group, in Columbus (OH)
      - Detachment 4, 2100th Military Intelligence Group, in Indianapolis (IN)
      - Detachment 5, 2100th Military Intelligence Group, at Fort Sheridan (IL)
      - Detachment 6, 2100th Military Intelligence Group, in Lincoln (NE)
    - 2200th Military Intelligence Group, at Fort Devens (MA)
      - Detachment 1, 2200th Military Intelligence Group, at Fort Devens (MA)
      - Detachment 2, 2200th Military Intelligence Group, in Mattydale (NY)
      - Detachment 3, 2200th Military Intelligence Group, in Colchester (VT)
      - Detachment 4, 2200th Military Intelligence Group, at Joint Base McGuire–Dix–Lakehurst (NJ)
    - 2300th Military Intelligence Group (supporting the National Ground Intelligence Center), in Charlottesville (VA)
      - Detachment 1, 2300th Military Intelligence Group, at Fort Meade (MD)
    - 2500th Military Intelligence Group, in Jacksonville (FL)
      - Detachment 1, 2500th Military Intelligence Group, in Miami (FL)
      - Detachment 2, 2500th Military Intelligence Group, in Jacksonville (FL)
      - Detachment 3, 2500th Military Intelligence Group, in Orlando (FL)
      - Detachment 4, 2500th Military Intelligence Group, at Naval Air Station Joint Reserve Base Fort Worth (TX)
    - 3100th Strategic Intelligence Group, at Fort Belvoir (VA)
      - Detachment 1, 3100th Strategic Intelligence Group, at Joint Base McGuire–Dix–Lakehurst (NJ)
      - Detachment 2, 3100th Strategic Intelligence Group, at Fort Belvoir (VA)
      - Detachment 3, 3100th Strategic Intelligence Group, at Fort Sheridan (IL)
      - Detachment 4, 3100th Strategic Intelligence Group, in Dayton (OH)
      - Detachment 5, 3100th Strategic Intelligence Group, at Fort Leavenworth (KS)
      - Detachment 6, 3100th Strategic Intelligence Group, at Naval Support Activity Millington (TN)
      - Detachment 7, 3100th Strategic Intelligence Group, at Fort Belvoir (VA)
      - Detachment 8, 3100th Strategic Intelligence Group, at Naval Air Station Joint Reserve Base Fort Worth (TX)
    - 3200th Strategic Intelligence Group, at Fort Belvoir (VA)
      - Detachment 1, 3200th Strategic Intelligence Group, at Fort Devens (MA)
      - Detachment 2, 3200th Strategic Intelligence Group, at Fort Belvoir (VA)
    - 3300th Strategic Intelligence Group, at Fort Belvoir (VA)
      - Detachment 1, 3300th Strategic Intelligence Group, at Fort Belvoir (VA)
      - Detachment 2, 3300th Strategic Intelligence Group, at Fort Belvoir (VA)
    - US Army Reserve Element — National Security Agency, Central Security Service, at Fort Gordon (GA)
    - US Army Reserve Element — National Security Agency, Central Security Service, at Fort Sheridan (IL)
    - US Army Reserve Element — National Security Agency, Central Security Service, at Camp Bullis (TX)
      - Detachment 2, National Security Agency, Central Security Service, at Naval Air Station Joint Reserve Base Fort Worth (TX)
    - US Army Reserve Element — National Security Agency, Central Security Service, in Garden Grove (CA)
    - US Army Reserve Element — National Security Agency, Central Security Service, at Joint Base Lewis–McChord (WA)
    - US Army Reserve Technical Control And Analysis Element, at Fort Meade (MD)
  - US Army Reserve Military Intelligence Training Support Command, at Fort Belvoir (VA)
    - 203rd Military Intelligence Battalion (Technical Intelligence), at Aberdeen Proving Ground (MD) (supports the National Ground Intelligence Center)
      - Headquarters and Headquarters Company, at Camp Bullis (TX)
      - Alpha Company, 203rd Military Intelligence Battalion (Technical Intelligence), at Aberdeen Proving Ground (MD)
      - Charlie Company, 203rd Military Intelligence Battalion (Technical Intelligence), at Aberdeen Proving Ground (MD)
      - Delta Company, 203rd Military Intelligence Battalion (Technical Intelligence), at Aberdeen Proving Ground (MD)
    - Northeastern Army Reserve Intelligence Support Center (NEARISC), at Joint Base McGuire–Dix–Lakehurst (NJ)
      - Detachment 1, Northeastern Army Reserve Intelligence Support Center (NEARISC), at Fort Devens (MA)
      - Detachment 2, Northeastern Army Reserve Intelligence Support Center (NEARISC), at Fort Meade (MD)
    - Southeastern Army Reserve Intelligence Support Center (SEARISC), at Fort Gillem (GA)
      - Detachment 1, Southeastern Army Reserve Intelligence Support Center (SEARISC), in Orlando (FL)
    - North-Central Army Reserve Intelligence Support Center (NCARISC), at Fort Sheridan (IL)
    - Southwestern Army Reserve Intelligence Support Center (SWARISC), at Camp Bullis (TX)
    - Western Army Reserve Intelligence Support Center (WARISC), at Camp Parks (CA)
      - Detachment 1, Western Army Reserve Intelligence Support Center (WARISC), in Phoenix (AZ)
  - 648th Regional Support Group, in Granite City (IL)
    - Headquarters and Headquarters Company, in Granite City (IL)
    - US Army Reserve Element — United States Africa Command Joint Intelligence Operations Center, at Fort Meade (MD)
    - US Army Reserve Element — United States Central Command Joint Intelligence Center, in Tampa (FL)
    - US Army Reserve Element — United States European Command Joint Analysis Center, at Fort Gillem (GA)
      - US Army Reserve Element — United States European Command Joint Analysis Center, at Fort Sheridan (IL)
      - US Army Reserve Element — United States European Command Joint Analysis Center, at Wright-Patterson Air Force Base (OH)
    - US Army Reserve Element — United States Indo-Pacific Command Joint Intelligence Operations Center, in Aurora (CO)

The 648th Regional Support Group was deactivated 22 June 2026.

== List of commanding generals ==
| No. | Image | Rank and name | Assumed command | Relinquished command |
|---|---|---|---|---|
| 1 | Gregory Schumacher | BG Gregory Schumacher | April 2004 | December 2007 |
| 2 | Leslie A. Purser | BG Leslie A. Purser | December 2007 | July 2009 |
| 3 | James V. Young Jr. | BG James V. Young Jr. | July 2009 | August 2011 |
| 4 | William F. Duffy | BG William F. Duffy | September 2011 | July 2013 |
| 5 | Brigadier General Gabriel Troiano | BG Gabriel Troiano | July 2013 | August 2015 |
| 6 | Christie Nixon | BG Christie L. Nixon | August 2015 | September 2018 |
| 7 | Aida T. Borras | BG Aida Terri Borras | February 2019 | March 26, 2021 |
| 8 | Joseph F. Dziezynski | BG Joseph F. Dziezynski | June 1, 2021 | June 3, 2023 |
| 9 | | BG Melissa K.G. Adamski | June 3, 2023 | May 17, 2025 |
| 10 | | BG C. Ryan Gunst | May 17, 2025 | Present |

== See also ==
- United States Army Intelligence and Security Command
- Military Intelligence Corps
- United States Army Reserve
- United States Army Reserve Command
- Reserve Component of the Armed Forces of the United States
