= 336th Brigade =

336th Brigade' may refer to:

- 336th Rocket Artillery Brigade, Soviet Union/Belarus
- 336th Separate Guards Naval Infantry Brigade, Soviet Union/Russia
- 336th Brigade, Royal Field Artillery, United Kingdom
- 336th Military Intelligence Brigade, United States
