= General Potts (disambiguation) =

Arthur Edward Potts (1890–1983) was a Canadian Army major general. General Potts may also refer to:

- Benjamin F. Potts (1836–1887), Union Army brigadier general and brevet major general
- William E. Potts (1921–2005), U.S. Army lieutenant general
- William Estel Potts (1935–2004), U.S. Army major general
