= 314 (disambiguation) =

314 may refer to:

- The year 314 or year 314 BC
- 314 (number)
- Boeing 314 Clipper was an American long-range flying boat produced by Boeing.
- 314 Rosalia is a large main-belt asteroid.
- In Buffy the Vampire Slayer, 314 is a reference to a top-secret government program created to produce man/machine/demon hybrid super soldiers such as Adam.
- 314 Action is a nonprofit political action committee (PAC)
- The 314th Cavalry Regiment (United States) was a military unit of the United States Army during World War I and the interwar period
- 314th Rifle Division (Soviet Union) was a standard Red Army rifle division.
- 314th Military Intelligence Battalion (United States) is a Military Intelligence Battalion of the United States Army Reserve.
- 314th Air Refueling Squadron is an active United States Air Force unit within the Air Force Reserve Command.
- 314th Air Division is an inactive United States Air Force unit.
- 314th Operations Group is the flying component of the Air Education and Training Command 314th Airlift Wing.
- 314th Airlift Wing is a wing of the United States Air Force.
- 314th Infantry Regiment (United States) is an infantry regiment of the U.S. Army.
