= 259th Military Intelligence Brigade =

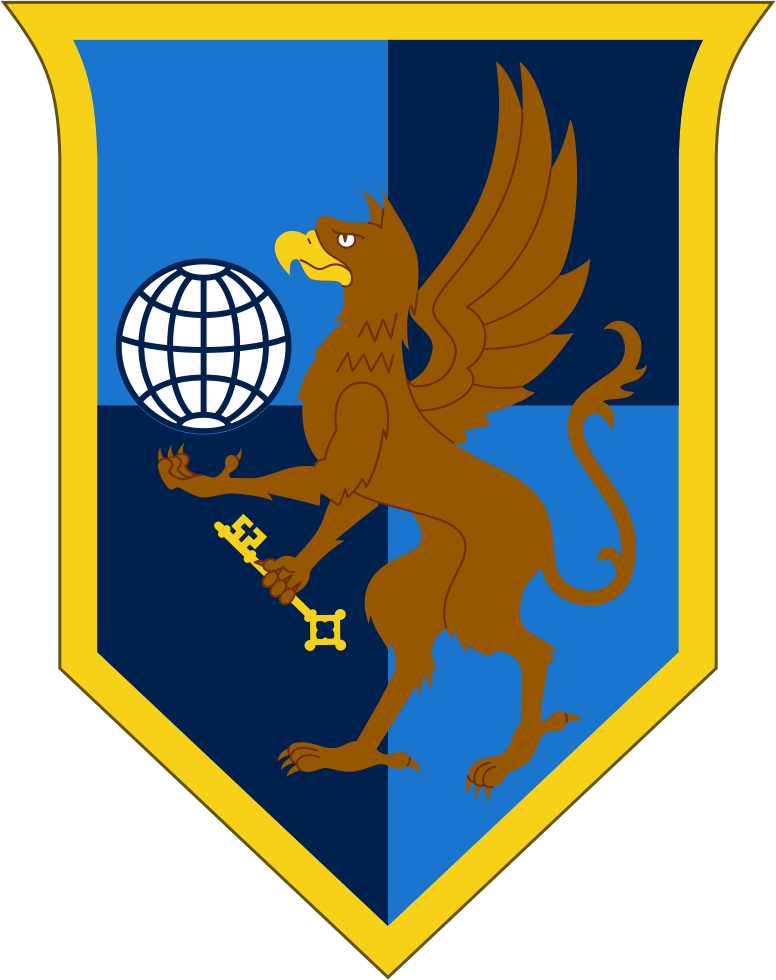
- Active: 1967-present
- Country: United States
- Branch: United States Army Reserve
- Role: Military Intelligence
- Size: Brigade
- Part of: Military Intelligence Readiness Command
- Garrison/HQ: Joint Base Lewis-McChord, WA
- Motto: Watchful And Vigilant
- Website: https://www.facebook.com/259thEMIB/

Commanders
- Current commander: COL Nathaniel Russ
- Command Sergeant Major: CSM Darnell Rambert

Insignia
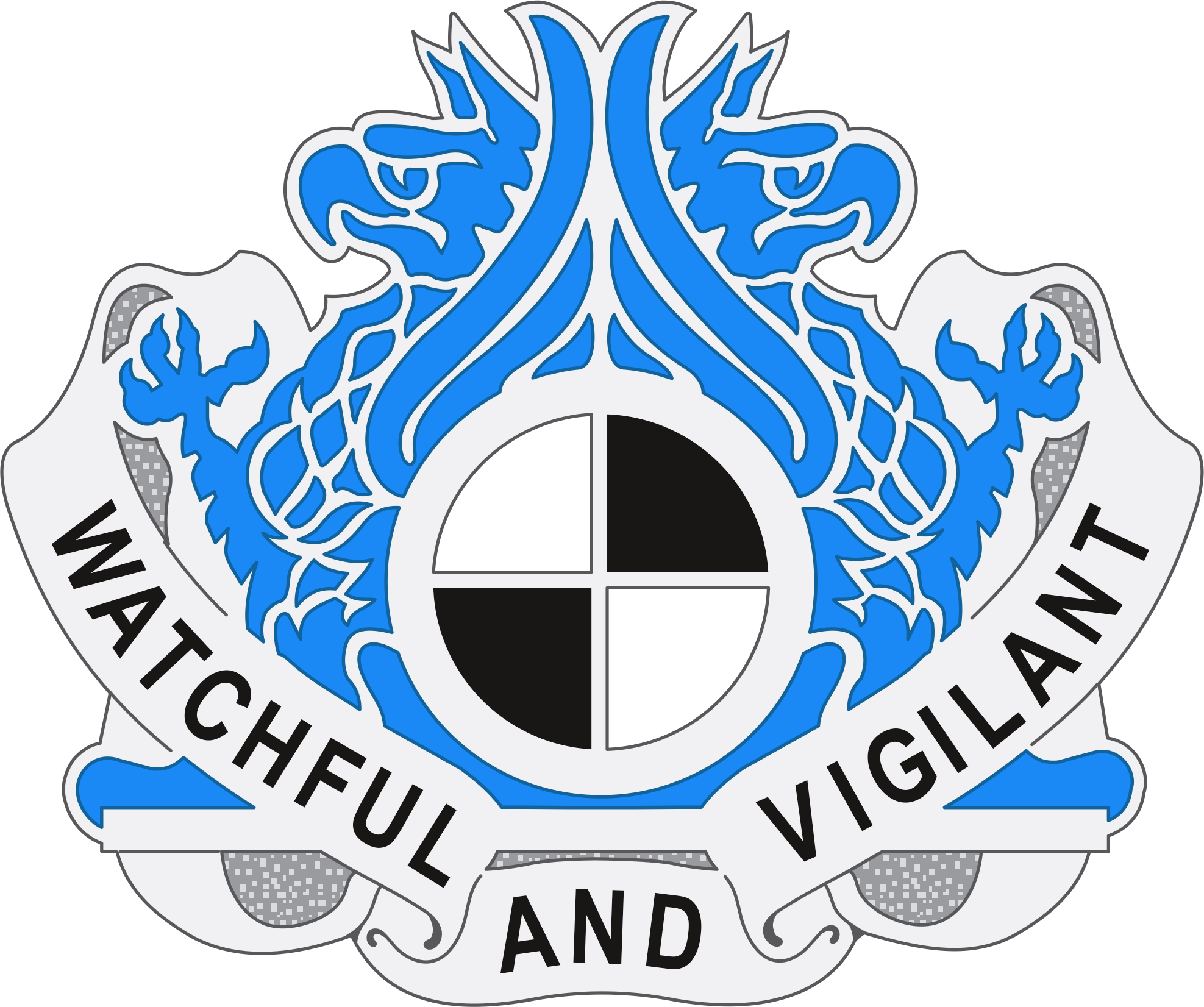
- 259th Military Intelligence Brigade DUI

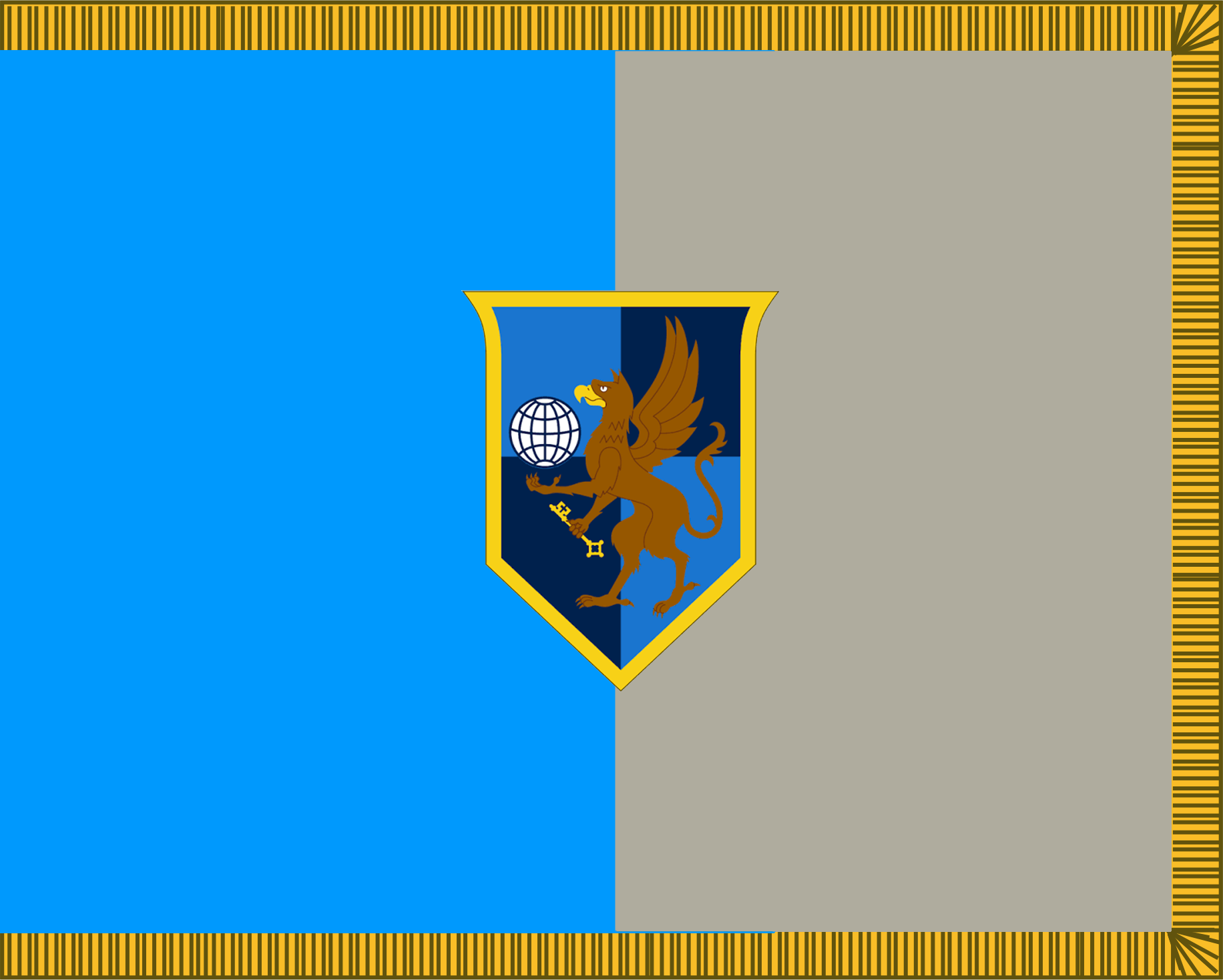
- 259th Military Intelligence Brigade Flag

The 259th Military Intelligence Brigade (Expeditionary) is a unit of the United States Army Reserve.

== History ==
It was first created in 1967 as the 259th Military Intelligence Group. It was inactivated in 1972. It was reactivated in August 1995 in Sharonville, Ohio. In 1997, the group was moved to Phoenix, Arizona and called 259th MI Group (West). Finally in September 2016 the group was reorganized as the 259th MI Brigade.

== Organization ==
The brigade is a subordinate unit of the US Army Reserve's Military Intelligence Readiness Command. As of January 2026 the brigade consists of the following units:

- 259th Military Intelligence Brigade (Expeditionary), at Joint Base Lewis–McChord (WA)
  - Headquarters and Headquarters Company, at Joint Base Lewis–McChord (WA)
  - 301st Military Intelligence Battalion (Theater Support), in Phoenix (AZ) (aligned with US Army Pacific's 500th Military Intelligence Brigade)
    - Headquarters and Headquarters Company, in Phoenix (AZ)
    - Alpha Company, 301st Military Intelligence Battalion (Theater Support), in Phoenix (AZ)
    - Bravo Company, 301st Military Intelligence Battalion (Theater Support), at Fort Shafter (HI)
    - Charlie Company, 301st Military Intelligence Battalion (Theater Support), in Phoenix (AZ)
  - 321st Military Intelligence Battalion (General Support), in Orlando (FL)
    - Headquarters and Headquarters Company, in Orlando (FL)
    - Alpha Company, 321st Military Intelligence Battalion (General Support), in Orlando (FL)
    - Bravo Company, 321st Military Intelligence Battalion (General Support), in Orlando (FL)
  - 368th Military Intelligence Battalion (Theater Support), at Camp Parks (CA) (aligned with Eighth Army's 501st Military Intelligence Brigade)
    - Headquarters and Headquarters Company, at Camp Parks (CA)
    - Alpha Company, 368th Military Intelligence Battalion (Theater Support), at Camp Parks (CA)
    - Bravo Company, 368th Military Intelligence Battalion (Theater Support), at Camp Parks (CA)
    - Charlie Company, 368th Military Intelligence Battalion (Theater Support), at Camp Parks (CA)
  - 373rd Military Intelligence Battalion (General Support), at Joint Base Lewis–McChord (WA)
    - Headquarters and Headquarters Company, at Joint Base Lewis–McChord (WA)
    - Alpha Company, 373rd Military Intelligence Battalion (General Support), at Joint Base Lewis–McChord (WA)
    - Bravo Company, 373rd Military Intelligence Battalion (General Support), at Joint Base Lewis–McChord (WA)
