= 368th Military Intelligence Battalion (United States) =

- 368th Military Intelligence Battalion coat of arms
- Active: 1995–present
- Country: United States
- Branch: United States Army Reserve
- Type: Military Intelligence
- Role: intelligence and electronic warfare (IEW); Human Intelligence (HUMINT); Signals Intelligence (SIGINT); Imagery Intelligence (IMINT)
- Garrison/HQ: Camp Parks, California & Patton USAR Center, Bell, California
- Motto: "Vanguard of the Pacific"

Insignia
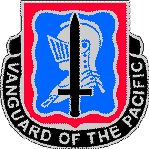
- Distinctive Unit Insignia

On order, the 368th Military Intelligence Battalion provides well trained and equipped soldiers who conduct many counterintelligence activities, to meet the operational intelligence requirements of Combatant Commands and the United States Intelligence Community. Their mission is to provide intelligence and electronic warfare (IEW) operations support for the 501st Military Intelligence Brigade in support of the Korean Theater. In peacetime, the battalion provides global Human Intelligence (HUMINT), Signals Intelligence (SIGINT), and Imagery Intelligence (IMINT) support to Army operations.

== Organization ==
The battalion is a subordinate unit of the US Army Reserve's 259th Military Intelligence Brigade (Expeditionary). As of January 2026 the battalion consists of the following units:

- 368th Military Intelligence Battalion (Theater Support), at Camp Parks (CA)
  - Headquarters and Headquarters Company, at Camp Parks (CA)
  - Alpha Company, 368th Military Intelligence Battalion (Theater Support), at Camp Parks (CA)
  - Bravo Company, 368th Military Intelligence Battalion (Theater Support), at Camp Parks (CA)
  - Charlie Company, 368th Military Intelligence Battalion (Theater Support), at Camp Parks (CA)

== History ==
Activated at Oakland, California on 16 September 1997, primarily from personnel, equipment and facilities of the inactivating 140th Military Intelligence Battalion, headquartered in Bell, California, and the 373rd Military Intelligence Battalion, headquartered in Oakland, California, the 368th MI Battalion retained neither the lineage nor colors of either inactivating battalion. Initially subordinate to the 259th Military Intelligence Group (West), the 368th Military Intelligence Battalion had companies and detachments located in Oakland, Bell, Phoenix, Arizona, Fort Huachuca, Arizona and Tumwater, Washington. Following the terrorist attacks on 11 September 2001, the 368th trained, mobilized and deployed counterintelligence and all-source intelligence Soldiers in support of the Global War on Terror (GWOT) to Afghanistan and Iraq, as well as Fort Lewis, Washington, the US Naval Base at Guantanamo Bay, Cuba and Fort Richardson, Alaska. Due to BRAC realignment, the headquarters was moved to a new facility at Camp Parks, California in 2010. The 368th MI Battalion had Charlie Company located at the General George Smith Patton Jr. United States Army Reserve Center in Bell, California until 2014 when the battalion reorganized its entire footprint to Camp Parks, California.

== Insignia ==
Distinctive Unit Insignia
Description: A silver color metal and enamel device 2.86 cm (1 1/8 in.) in height, consisting of a shield blazoned: Azure (Oriental Blue) a helm Argent (Silver Gray), garnished of the first superimposed by a sword palewise Sable; a bordure wavy Gules fimbriated Argent. Attached below the shield is a black scroll inscribed "VANGUARD OF THE PACIFIC" in silver.
Symbolism: Oriental blue and silver gray are the colors traditionally used by the Military Intelligence Corps. Red denotes valor and zeal; the wavy border alludes to the Pacific Rim, the ring of fire. The blue represents the Pacific Ocean. Black is the color of stealth and together with gray represents the military intelligence unit's night and day vigilance and covert and overt missions. The helmet and sword highlight the organization's combat preparedness. The unsheathed sword implies the vanguard position thus reinforcing the motto.
Background: The distinctive unit insignia was authorized on 11 September 1998.

Coat of Arms
Shield: Azure (Oriental Blue) a helm Argent (Silver Gray) garnished of the first superimposed by a sword palewise Sable; a bordure wavy Gules fimbriated Argent. Oriental blue and silver gray are the colors traditionally used by the Military Intelligence Corps. Red denotes valor and zeal; the wavy border alludes to the Pacific Rim, the ring of fire. The blue represents the Pacific Ocean. Black is the color of stealth and together with gray represents the military intelligence unit's night and day vigilance and covert and overt missions. The helmet and sword highlight the organization's combat preparedness. The unsheathed sword implies the vanguard position thus reinforcing the motto.
Crest: That for the regiments and separate battalions of the Army Reserve: On a wreath of the colors, argent and azure, the Lexington Minuteman proper. The statue of the Minuteman, Capt. John Parker (Henry Hudson Kitson, sculptor), stands on the Common in Lexington, Massachusetts.
Background: The coat of arms was authorized for the 368th Military Intelligence Battalion on 11 September 1998.

Motto

"Vanguard of the Pacific"

== List of Commanders ==
Image	Rank	Name	Begin date	End date	Notes
	Lieutenant Colonel	Stephen T. Burcham	July 2011	July 2013	
	Lieutenant Colonel	Paul B. Strickland	July 2013	June 2015	
	Lieutenant Colonel	Jens J. Hansen	June 2015	June 2016	
	Lieutenant Colonel	Jay A. Iannacito	August 2016	May 2017	
	Lieutenant Colonel	Kelvin C. Wong	May 2017	September 2019	
	Lieutenant Colonel	Nathan P. Ringger	September 2019	August 2021	
	Lieutenant Colonel	Rene A. Mohamed	August 2021	June 2023	
	Lieutenant Colonel	Aaron L. Hoffman	September 2023	September 2025	
