= 301st Military Intelligence Battalion (United States) =

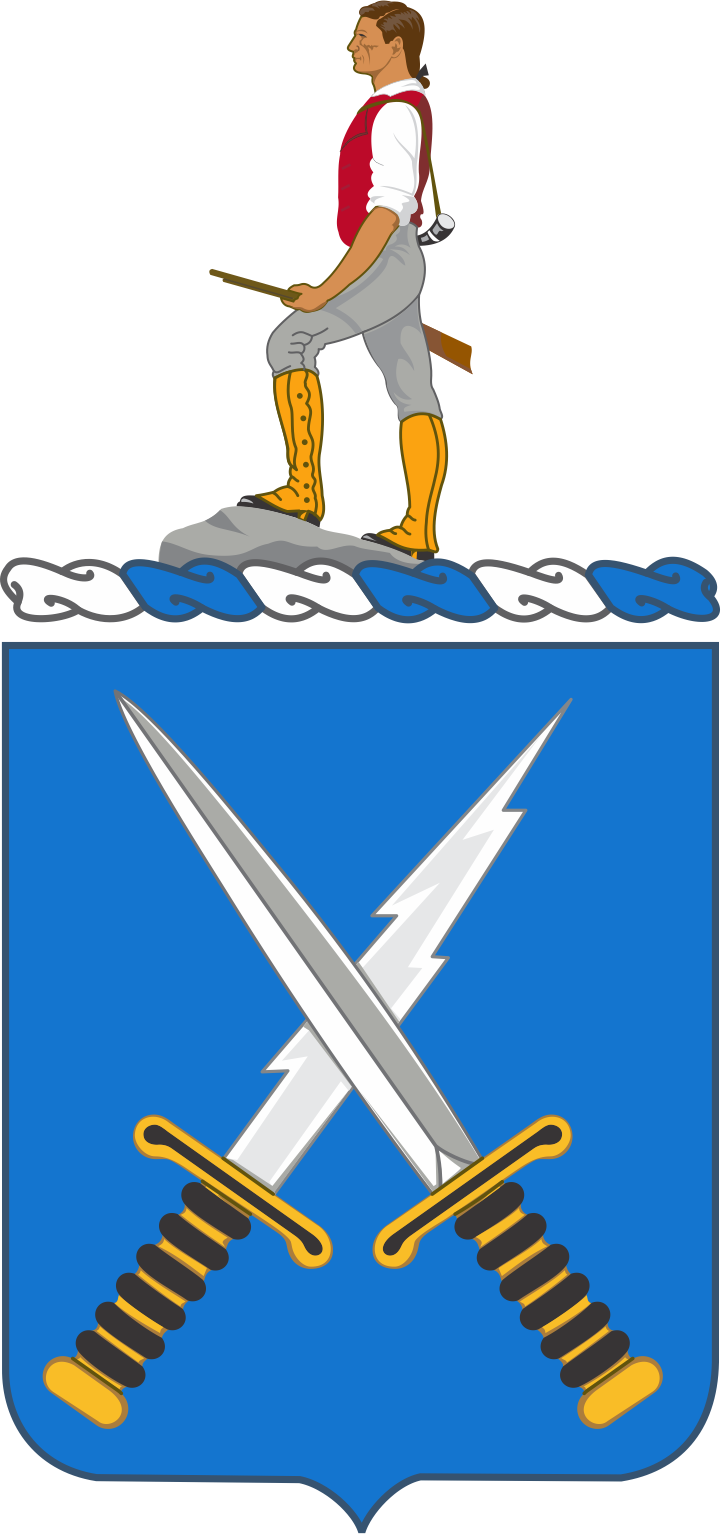
- Coat of Arms
- Active: 22 June 1949 – 23 February 1953; 16 September 1988 – 15 September 1997; 16 April 2005 – present
- Country: United States
- Allegiance: Army Reserve
- Branch: Military Intelligence
- Type: Separate Battalion
- Role: Theater Support
- Size: Battalion
- Part of: US Army Military Intelligence Readiness Command; 500th Military Intelligence Brigade
- Garrison/HQ: Phoenix, Arizona
- Motto: One Team One Fight!

Insignia
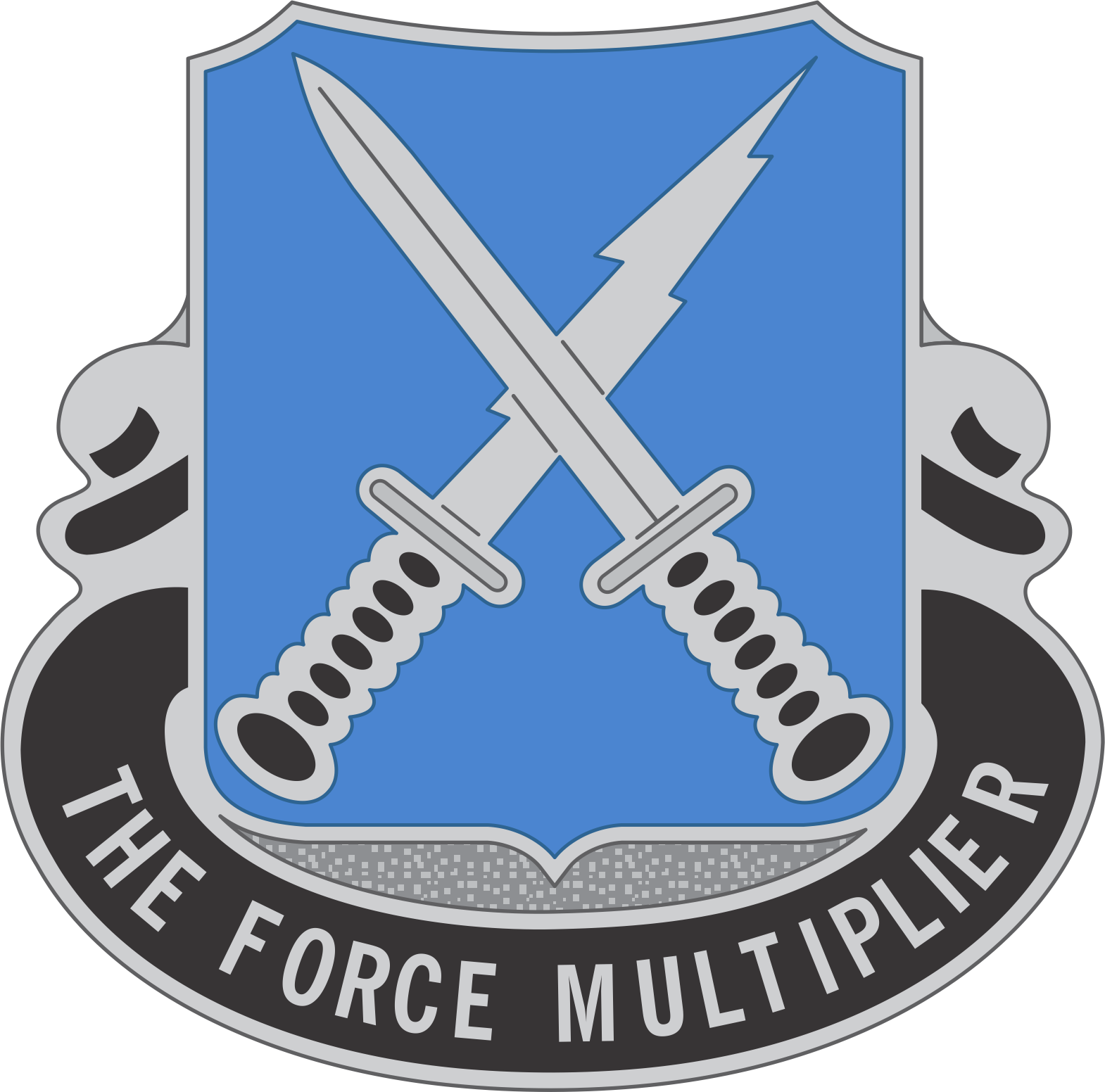
- Distinctive Unit Insignia

The 301st Military Intelligence Battalion is located in Phoenix, Arizona.

== Lineage ==
- Constituted 6 June 1949 in the Organized Reserve Corps as Headquarters, 301st Military Intelligence Platoon.
- Activated 22 June 1949 at Austin, Texas
- Reorganized and redesignated 1 September 1950 as Headquarters, 301st Military Intelligence Battalion.
- Organized Reserve Corps redesignated 9 July 1952 as the Army Reserve.
- Battalion Inactivated 23 February 1953 at Austin, Texas
- Redesignated 16 September 1988 as Headquarters, Headquarters and Service Company, 301st Military Intelligence Battalion, and activated at Pasadena, Texas
  (organic elements concurrently constituted and activated)
- Battalion inactivated 15 September 1997 at Pasadena, Texas
- Activated 16 April 2005 with headquarters at Phoenix, Arizona

== Mission ==
The 301st Military Intelligence Theater Support Battalion (301st MI TSB) is a MIRC-aligned Reserve Intelligence Battalion focused on providing highly trained intelligence Soldiers to facilitate and integrate into military units mobilized around the world. The 301st also trains and prepares for mobilization as a support battalion, focusing on the Pacific Theater under the 500th MI BDE.

301st currently provides training and specialization in the following Intelligence Sections: All-Source, Counter-Intelligence, Human Intelligence, Signals Intelligence, Geospatial Intelligence, and Technical Intelligence.

== Organization ==
The battalion is a subordinate unit of the US Army Reserve's 259th Military Intelligence Brigade (Expeditionary). As of January 2026 the battalion consists of the following units:

- 301st Military Intelligence Battalion (Theater Support), in Phoenix (AZ)
  - Headquarters and Headquarters Company, in Phoenix (AZ)
  - Alpha Company, 301st Military Intelligence Battalion (Theater Support), in Phoenix (AZ)
  - Bravo Company, 301st Military Intelligence Battalion (Theater Support), at Fort Shafter (HI)
  - Charlie Company, 301st Military Intelligence Battalion (Theater Support), in Phoenix (AZ)

== Honors ==
- Campaign Participation Credit: Alpha Company – Iraqi Service Streamer
- Decorations: none
