= 336th Military Intelligence Brigade =

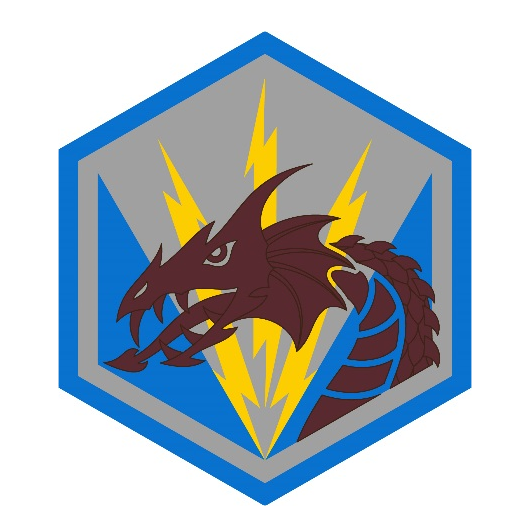
- Active: 2012-present
- Country: United States
- Branch: United States Army Reserve
- Role: Military Intelligence
- Size: Brigade
- Part of: Military Intelligence Readiness Command
- Garrison/HQ: Joint Base McGuire–Dix–Lakehurst, Trenton, NJ
- Motto: VICTORIA PER INTELLIGENTIA (Victory From Intelligence)
- Website: https://www.facebook.com/336themib/

Commanders
- Current commander: Col. Monique M. Chetcuti
- Command Sergeant Major: Sgt. Maj. Henry R. Harris

Insignia
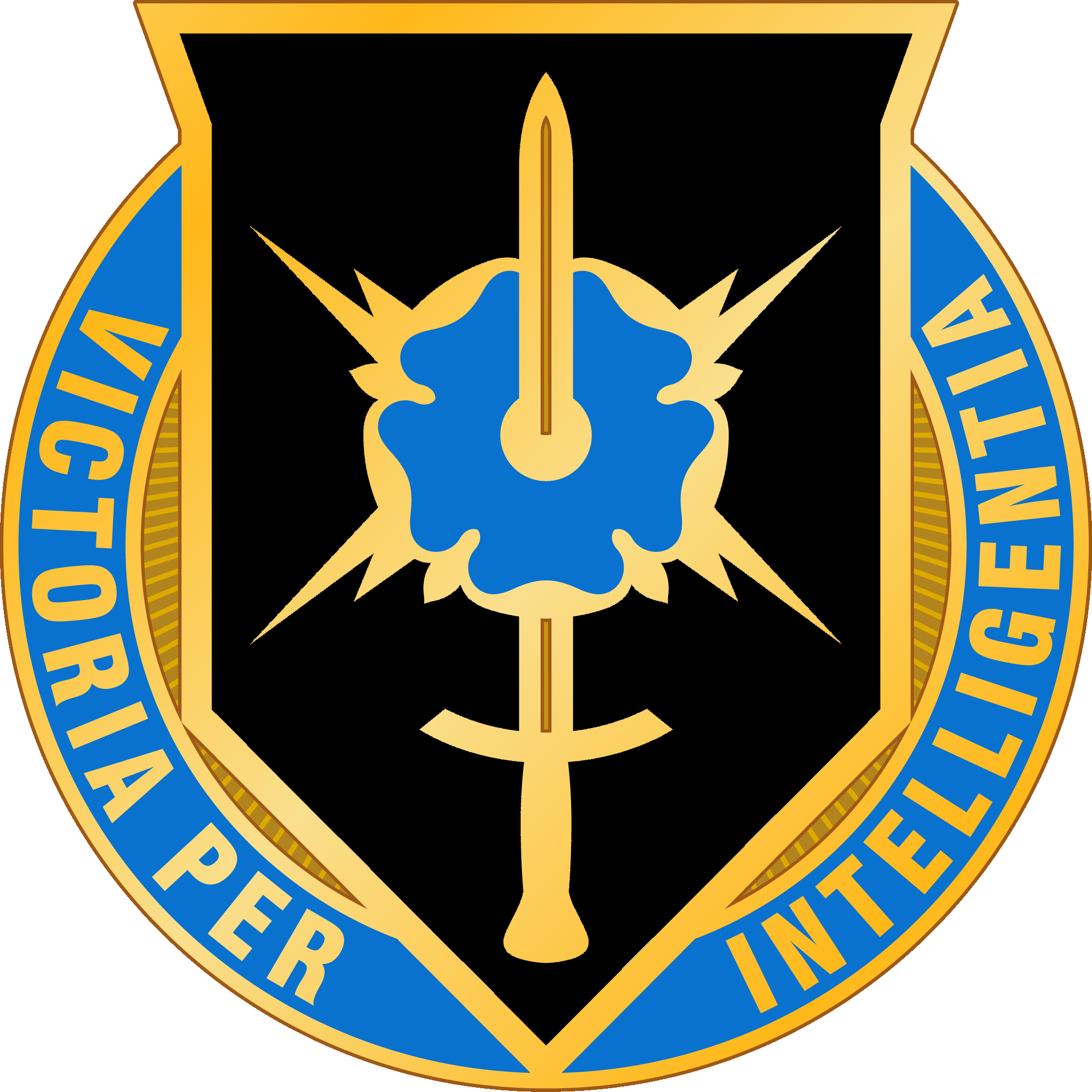
- 33th Military Intelligence Brigade DUI

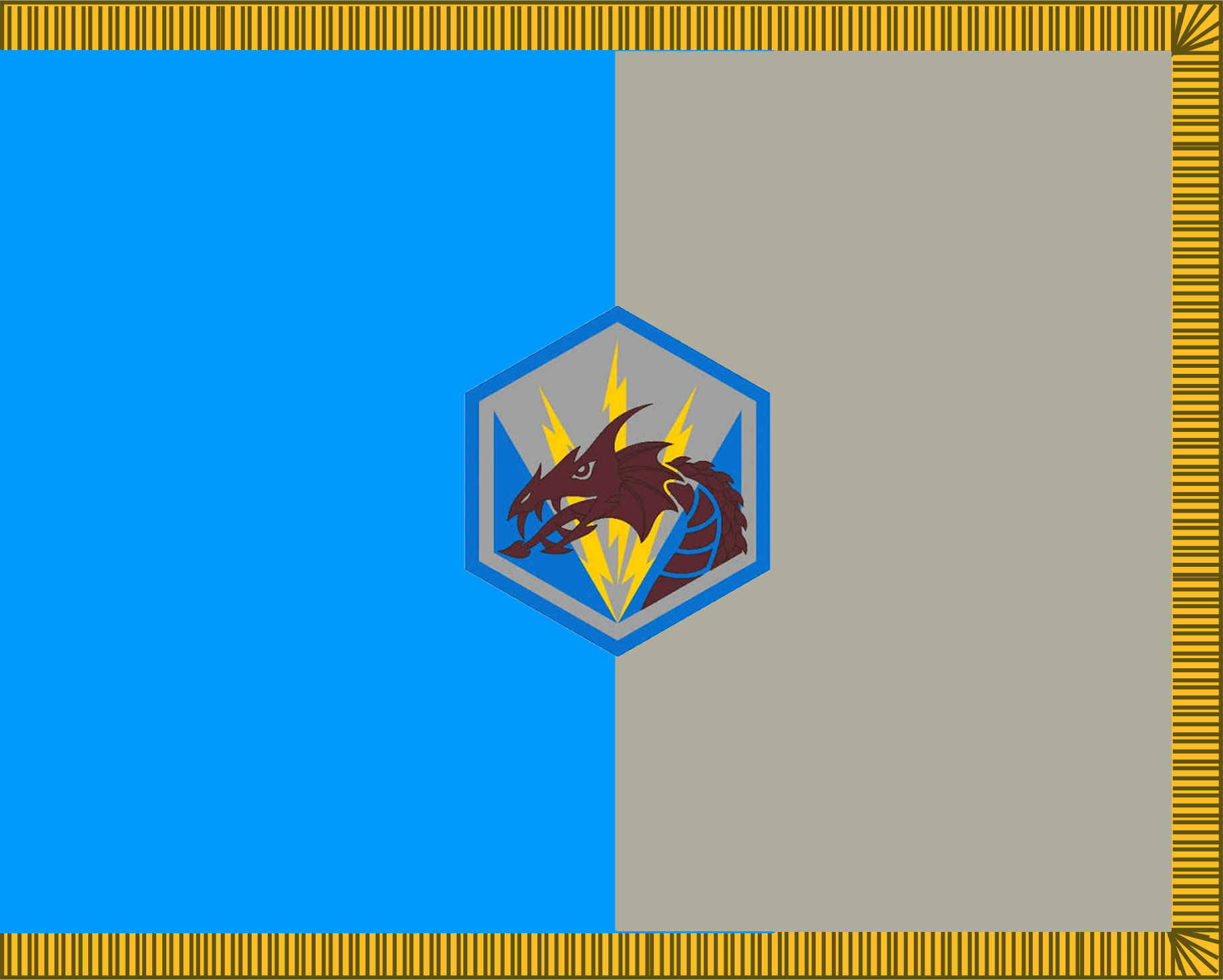
- 335th Military Intelligence Brigade Flag

The 336th Military Intelligence Brigade (Expeditionary) is a unit of the US Army Reserve and is a part of the Military Intelligence Readiness Command. The unit was created in 2016 and is assigned to Joint Base McGuire–Dix–Lakehurst.

== Organization ==
The brigade is a subordinate unit of the US Army Reserve's Military Intelligence Readiness Command. As of January 2026 the brigade consists of the following units:

- 336th Military Intelligence Brigade (Expeditionary), at Joint Base McGuire–Dix–Lakehurst (NJ)
  - Headquarters and Headquarters Company, at Joint Base McGuire–Dix–Lakehurst (NJ)
  - 323rd Military Intelligence Battalion (Theater Support), at Fort Meade (MD)(aligned with US Army Europe's 66th Military Intelligence Brigade)
    - Headquarters and Headquarters Company, at Fort Meade (MD)
    - Alpha Company, 323rd Military Intelligence Battalion (Theater Support), at Fort Meade (MD)
    - Bravo Company, 323rd Military Intelligence Battalion (Theater Support), at Fort Meade (MD)
    - Charlie Company, 323rd Military Intelligence Battalion (Theater Support), at Fort Meade (MD)
  - 325th Military Intelligence Battalion (General Support), at Fort Devens (MA)
    - Headquarters and Headquarters Company, at Fort Devens (MA)
    - Alpha Company, 325th Military Intelligence Battalion (General Support), at Fort Totten (NY)
    - Bravo Company, 325th Military Intelligence Battalion (General Support), at Fort Devens (MA)
  - 337th Military Intelligence Battalion (Theater Support), at Fort Sheridan (IL) (aligned with US Army Africa's 207th Military Intelligence Brigade)
    - Headquarters and Headquarters Company, at Fort Sheridan (IL)
    - Alpha Company, 337th Military Intelligence Battalion (Theater Support), in Lake Forest (IL)
    - Bravo Company, 337th Military Intelligence Battalion (Theater Support), at Fort Snelling (MN)
    - Charlie Company, 337th Military Intelligence Battalion (Theater Support), in Milwaukee (WI)
  - 345th Military Intelligence Battalion (Theater Support), at Fort Gordon (GA) (aligned with US Army Central's 513th Military Intelligence Brigade)
    - Headquarters and Headquarters Company, at Fort Gordon (GA)
    - Alpha Company, 345th Military Intelligence Battalion (Theater Support), at Fort Gordon (GA)
    - Bravo Company, 345th Military Intelligence Battalion (Theater Support), at Fort Gillem (GA)
    - Charlie Company, 345th Military Intelligence Battalion (Theater Support), at Fort Gillem (GA)
  - 378th Military Intelligence Battalion (General Support), in Blackwood (NJ)
    - Headquarters and Headquarters Company, in Blackwood (NJ)
    - Alpha Company, 378th Military Intelligence Battalion (General Support), at Biddle Air National Guard Base (PA)
    - Bravo Company, 378th Military Intelligence Battalion (General Support), at Joint Base McGuire–Dix–Lakehurst (NJ)
