= Geospatial Intelligence Battalion =

Army GEOINT Battalion
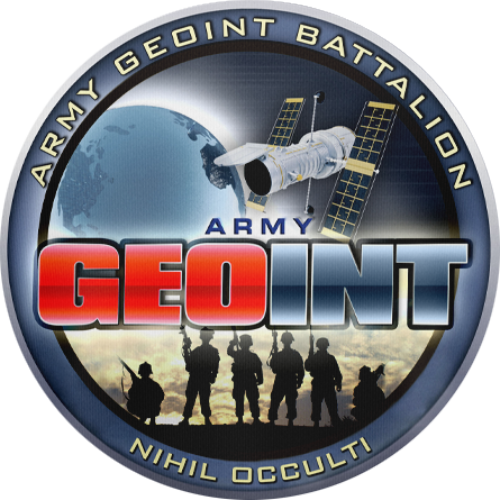
- The battalion insignia, including a nominal rendering of a KH-11 spy satellite positioned over the earth
- Active: 2001 – present
- Country: United States
- Branch: United States Army
- Type: Military intelligence
- Role: Geospatial intelligence
- Size: 200 (40% military, 60% civilian)
- Part of: National Ground Intelligence Center, Intelligence and Security Command
- Headquarters: National Geospatial-Intelligence Agency, Fort Belvoir, Springfield, Virginia, United States
- Nicknames: "GEOINT Battalion", "AGB"
- Mottos: Nihil Occulti; Latin: "Nothing Hidden"
- Engagements: See list: Operation Just Cause; Operation Desert Storm; Operation Uphold Democracy; Operation Restore Hope; Operation Support Hope; Operation Joint Endeavor; Operation Allied Force; Operation Iraqi Freedom; Operation Enduring Freedom

Insignia
- INSCOM shoulder sleeve insignia

The United States Army Geospatial Intelligence Battalion (GEOINT Battalion or AGB), previously known as the 3rd Military Intelligence Center, is a military intelligence battalion specializing in the production and exploitation of geospatial intelligence (GEOINT), and the only operational military command at the National Geospatial-Intelligence Agency (NGA). Co-located within the NGA headquarters (NGA-East) on Fort Belvoir in Springfield, Virginia, the unit produces and analyzes geospatial intelligence products for ground combat forces in close collaboration with its host agency and other members of the U.S. Intelligence Community. Though colocated with NGA, the AGB differs from NGA's own Support Teams in that it receives tasking from the Army.

A majority of the battalion's members are civilians, 60 percent are either Department of Defense employees or contractors from primarily BAE Systems while only 40 percent are active or reserve military servicemembers. Organizationally the battalion is a major component of the National Ground Intelligence Center (NGIC), a part of INSCOM. The unit and its predecessors have provided GEOINT products to support every major U.S. military operation since its inception. The battalion is currently responsible for three core functions: Intelligence Reach Operations, Foundry (Advanced Skills Training), and GEOINT Collection Management. It produces imagery derived products in bulk for deployed units around the world, supporting standing GEOINT targeting requirements, providing answers to specific requests for information.

Command of the battalion is a lieutenant colonel's billet.

== Operations ==
=== Training ===
The battalion is INSCOM's lead unit for GEOINT Foundry advanced skills training and teaches five separate GEOINT related courses: the Imagery Orientation Course, GEOINT Production Course, Advanced GEOINT Production Course, Tactical Full Motion Video Production Course, and Global Broadcast Service System Users Course.

== History ==
=== Origins ===
The 3d Military Intelligence (MI) Center traces its lineage back to the U.S. Army Intelligence Threat and Analysis Center, commonly referred to as ITAC, which was organized in 1975. Effective 1 October 1977, ITAC was provisionally established as a major subordinate command of INSCOM and was collocated with the Defense Intelligence Agency at Arlington Hall Station. On 30 April 1985, ITAC was placed under the control of the Army Intelligence Agency until April 1991, when it was again placed under INSCOM.

In 1995, ITAC was realigned as the Training and Contingency Directorate of the National Ground Intelligence Center (NGIC). During this time, the 3rd MI Center, located at Fort Shafter, Hawaii, had been deactivated and its colors retired for three years.

On 16 October 2001, ITAC, now under the colors of the 3rd Military Intelligence Center, was formed into the Imagery Assessments Directorate of NGIC, and subsequently, the 3rd MI Center was re-activated at the Washington Navy Yard, Washington, D.C. In the following decade, the directorate underwent several name changes, first to the Imagery and MASINT Assessments Directorate and later to the Geospatial Intelligence Directorate, before reaching its current incarnation, the Geospatial Intelligence Battalion, in 2011. At the time of the battalion's most recent redesignation, GEOINT functions that were previously performed independently by the Engineer and the Military Intelligence branches were merged. With this change came the addition of military geospatial engineers to the existing intelligence analyst manning structure. Other changes included standardizing how Army GEOINT cells are deployed and introducing opportunities for geospatial engineers and imagery analysts to train together at the U.S. Army Intelligence Center.

Since being stood up in 1975, the unit has provided GEOINT to support every successive major U.S. campaign, including operations Just Cause (Panama), Desert Storm (Kuwait), Uphold Democracy (Haiti), Restore Hope (Somalia), Support Hope (Rwanda), Joint Endeavor (Bosnia), Allied Force (Kosovo), Enduring Freedom (Afghanistan), and Iraqi Freedom (Iraq).

=== Global War on Terror ===
The 3d MI Center conducted four Mobile Training Team engagements focusing on leadership, analysis, equipment, and exercise support, reaching every unit deploying in support of Operations Enduring Freedom and Iraqi Freedom and training over 500 Soldiers per year at deploying units’ home stations. The unit also led Imagery Exploitation for Multi-National Force Iraq’s CACE during their Reliefs in Place/Transfers of Authority.

== List of Commanders ==
No.	Commander		Term		
No.	Portrait	Name	Took office	Left office	Term length
-	David Trotter[citation needed]	Lieutenant Colonel; David Trotter	June 2010	June 2012	2 years, 1 day
-	unknown	Lieutenant Colonel unknown	June 2012	July 2014	2 years, 30 days
-	Alyssa G. Drew	Lieutenant Colonel; Alyssa G. Drew	July 2014	July 2016	2 years, 0 days
-	Jacquelyn Barcomb	Lieutenant Colonel; Jacquelyn Barcomb	July 2016	July 2018	2 years, 17 days
-	Shannon Helberg	Lieutenant Colonel; Shannon Helberg	July 2018	July 2020	1 year, 349 days
