= 314th Military Intelligence Battalion (United States) =

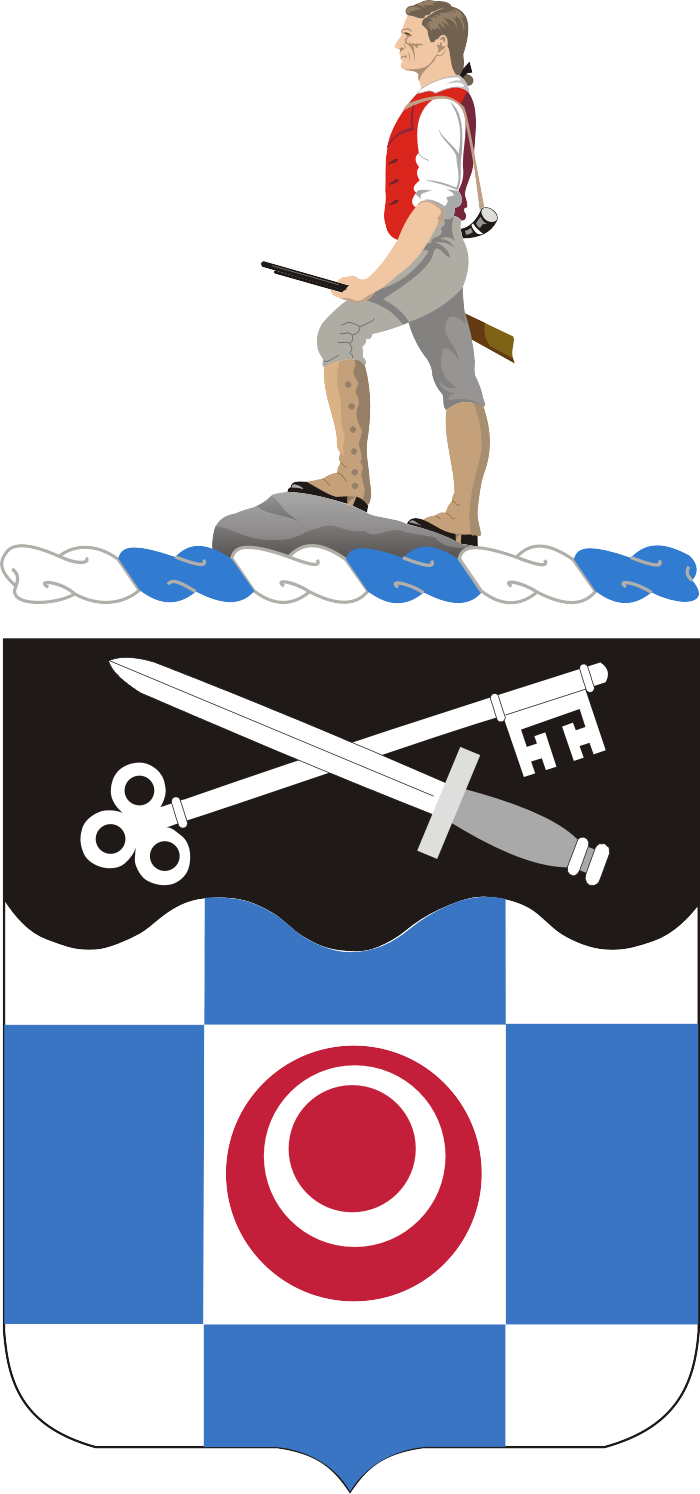
- 314th Military Intelligence Battalion Coat of Arms
- Country: United States
- Branch: United States Army
- Type: Military Intelligence
- Role: Joint Interrogation and Debriefing Center (JIDC)
- Size: Battalion
- Garrison/HQ: San Diego, CA
- Patron: Joshua
- Motto(s): Sapeintia et Veritas (Wisdom and Truth)
- Colors: Oriental Blue Silver Gray Okinawan Red
- Mascot(s): Icebergs
- Anniversaries: February 27, 1945

Insignia
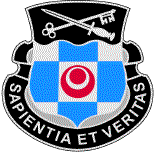
- Distinctive Unit Insignia

The 314th Military Intelligence Battalion is a Military Intelligence Battalion of the United States Army Reserve located in San Diego County and Los Angeles County, California. The organization trains to conduct theater-level interrogation operations, detainee screening, document and media exploitation (DOMEX), target exploitation (TAREX), strategic debriefing, counterintelligence, and analysis in support of the deployed Commander's Theater Interrogation Facility (TIF) or as the Army component of the Joint Interrogation and Debriefing Center (JIDC).

== Lineage and honors ==
The history of the 314th Military Intelligence Battalion begins in World War II during the Allies' final push for victory in the Pacific. On 27 February 1945, the 314th Headquarters Intelligence Detachment was activated near Dulag, Leyte, Philippine Islands and assigned to the 96th Infantry Division with subordinate teams such as the 389th Translator Team, 344th Interrogation Team, and 372nd Interpreter Team. The 314th Headquarters Intelligence Detachment was made up of Lieutenant Allen E. Beach and ten enlisted men. The unit was to interface with the division's G-2 and coordinate the activities of five intelligence teams responsible for a variety of intelligence functions ranging from photo interpretation to interrogations. Oral histories from 314th veterans indicate that they did not use, and possibly were not even aware of, the separate subordinate team designations.

The ten enlisted men serving with the 314th constituted one of military intelligence's most important "secret" weapons of the war. The use of second generation Japanese-Americans or Nisei.(As youngsters, many had received formal schooling in the Japanese language.) Following a refresher course at the Army's Language School at Camp Savage, Minnesota, they left for the Pacific where they served as interrogators, interpreters, and translators. The ten Nisei assigned to the 314th included Fred Fukushima, Akira Ohoi, Herbert Yamamura, Takejiro Higa, Fred Nonaka, Osamu Yamamoto, Thomas Masui, Haruo Kawana, Warren Higa, and Rudy Kawahara.

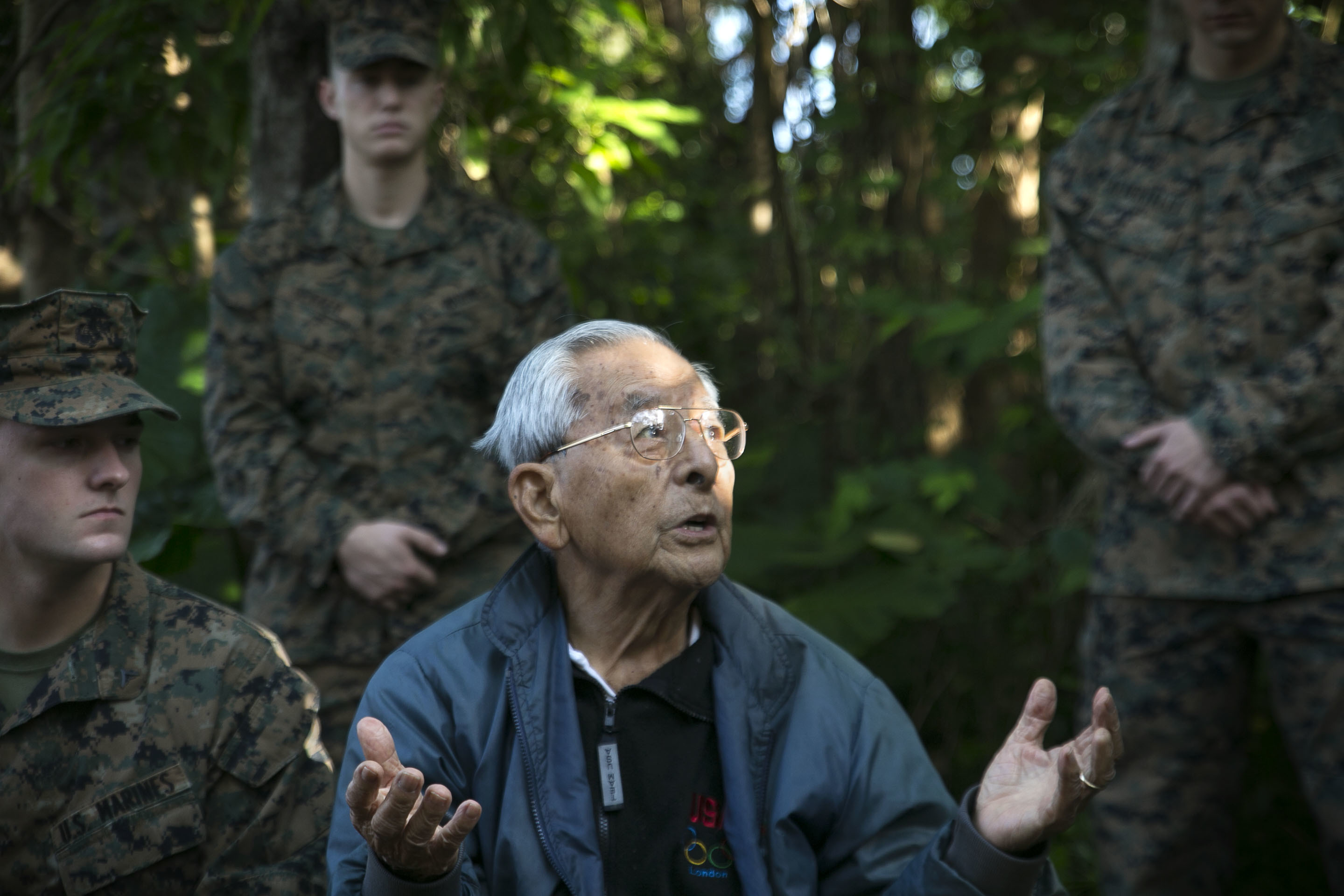
Takejiro Higa, Battle of Okinawa veteran visits cave where he saved lives 141121-M-JP123-001

By early 1945, the campaign for Leyte was in its final stages. In February, the 96th Infantry Division was relieved of all combat duty in the Philippines and began training for an assault on the Japanese-held island of Okinawa for Operation Iceberg. Tech Sergeant Takejiro Higa of the 314th related how he reacted to learning about the invasion of Okinawa. " ... entering the tent my heart nearly stopped beating as I saw hung before me a large blown-up map of the southern half of Okinawa. Chills ran up my spine as I realized the next target would be that part of Okinawa where I had lived for 14 years and left merely 6 years before."

On 25 March the first elements departed for the Ryukyu Islands, a chain running southwest from Japan toward Taiwan. The 314th Detachment left a day later aboard the USS Mendocino. The 96th Infantry Division was among the units chosen to lead the assault. However, when they landed on Okinawa on 1 April there was surprisingly no opposition and by nightfall over 60,000 troops were ashore. It would be the calm before the storm. What lay ahead was America's bloodiest campaign against Imperial Japan. The island was dotted with hills, ravines, and caves-the last of natural rock and coral, providing any defender with ready-made fortifications and storehouses.

Because the Allies had taken so few prisoners during the war in the Pacific, translation of documents became a critical source of intelligence, as would prove to be the case in the Okinawa campaign. Besides intelligence work, the Nisei were able to persuade some enemy soldiers into surrendering and to talk local civilians out of hiding. All of which was done at great personal risk, but the result saved many lives including those of American soldiers. The campaign for the Ryukyus represented the last major battle of World War II for the American soldier. In July the 314th returned to Mindoro in the Philippine Islands and remained there until the end of the war. Following World War II, the 314th played an important role during the occupation period. There was a need for linguists to assist in rounding up war criminals and protecting the occupying forces-all important missions for Army intelligence. On 31 October 1945, the commander of the 314th departed for Korea. (Once in country, the detachment began picking up replacement personnel.) Here it served with the XXIV Corps, which was given the responsibility for accepting the transfer of Japanese control. On 25 March 1947, the 314th was inactivated in Korea.

From 21 May 1948 to 30 June 1950, the 314th served as a Reserve unit in Boston, Massachusetts. On 10 August 1950, the 314th was redesignated as Headquarters, 314th Military Intelligence Battalion. One result of the Korean War and increased tensions in Europe during the early 1950s was the introduction of group and battalion-size units to military intelligence. On 30 August it was again activated; this time in Cleveland, Ohio. At the end of the Korean War, the need for the 314th went away, and the battalion was inactivated on 1 April 1953. Its final tour in the Reserves began on 16 September 1988 when it was redesignated as Headquarters, Headquarters and Service Company, 314th Military Intelligence Battalion, and activated at Detroit, Michigan. On 15 September 1997, the 314th was inactivated. For over 50 years, the members of the 314th MI Battalion have served proudly in support of the Nation, its Army, and Military Intelligence. On 16 June 2000, the 314th MI Battalion began a new chapter and assumed a new mission upon its activation at San Antonio, Texas, and assignment to the 116th Military Intelligence Brigade, and then to the Army Reserve in San Diego 16 October 2012.

=== Lineage ===
- Constituted 14 December 1944 in the Army of the United States as the 314th Headquarters Intelligence Detachment
- Activated 27 February 1945 in the Philippines
- Inactivated 25 March 1947 in Korea
- Allotted 20 April 1948 to the Organized Reserve Corps
- Activated 21 May 1948 at Boston, Massachusetts
- Inactivated 30 June 1950 at Boston, Massachusetts
- Redesignated 10 August 1950 as Headquarters, 314th Military Intelligence Battalion
- Activated 30 August 1950 at Cleveland, Ohio
- (Organized Reserve Corps redesignated 9 July 1952 as the Army Reserve)
- Inactivated 1 April 1953 at Cleveland, Ohio
- Redesignated 16 September 1988 as Headquarters, Headquarters and Service Company, 314th Military Intelligence Battalion, and activated at Detroit, Michigan (organic elements concurrently constituted and activated)
- Battalion inactivated 15 September 1997 at Detroit, Michigan
- Withdrawn 4 February 1999 from the Army Reserve and allotted to the Regular Army
- Activated 16 June 2000 at San Antonio, Texas
- Inactivated 30 September 2009 at Fort Sam Houston, Texas
- Withdrawn 4 January 2011 from the Regular Army and allotted to the Army Reserve
- Activated 16 October 2012 at San Diego, California

=== Campaign participation credit ===
- World War II in the Asiatic-Pacific Theater at Ryukyus

=== Decorations ===
Ribbon	Award	Streamer	Streamer embroidered
U.S. Army and U.S. Air Force Presidential Unit Citation ribbon	Presidential Unit Citation (Army)		Okinawa
Air Force Outstanding Unit Award ribbon	Air Force Outstanding Unit Award		2001-2003

== Coat of arms and distinctive unit insignia ==
=== Coat of arms ===
Shield: Argent, within a cross quarter pierced Azure (Oriental Blue) the device from the flag of Okinawa Proper; on a chief wavy Sable a dagger and a key wards up saltirewise of the first.

Crest: From a wreath Argent and Azure (Oriental Blue) a sun of sixteen rays in glory Or surmounted by a Japanese "Hutatue-domoe" (sphere of two commas) Gules and overall in base two swords blades up saltirewise of the third. Motto: SAPIENTIA ET VERITAS (Wisdom and Truth).

=== Distinctive Unit Insignia Description ===
A silver color metal and enamel device 1 1/8 inches (2.9 cm) in height overall consisting of a shield blazoned: Argent, within a cross quarter pierced Azure (Oriental Blue) the device from the flag of Okinawa Proper; on a chief wavy Sable a dagger and a key wards up saltirewise of the first. Attached below the shield a black scroll inscribed "SAPIENTIA ET VERITAS" in silver letters.

=== Origin/meaning ===
Oriental blue and silver/silver gray are the colors traditionally associated with the Military Intelligence Corps. The red and white Okinawa symbol represents the unit's Pacific service. The blue and white squares simulate a chess board band allude to strategy in gathering intelligence information. Black implies covert operations while the silver key and sword refer to securing information for military activities. Black and white also signify day and night operations. Crest: The sun represents the Pacific theater of war against Japan during World War II, its many rays symbolizing the islands of the Ryukyu group where the 314th saw action. The scarlet "sphere of two commas" represents Japan and suggests the rising sun symbol of Imperial Japan shattered by United States forces. The swords denote combat and readiness. Gold signifies excellence, scarlet indicates courage and sacrifice.

The Coat of Arms was originally approved on 9 May 1990. It was amended to include a crest on 22 June 2000. The distinctive unit insignia was approved on 8 May 1990.

== See also ==
- United States Army Military Intelligence Readiness Command
