= William E. Potts =

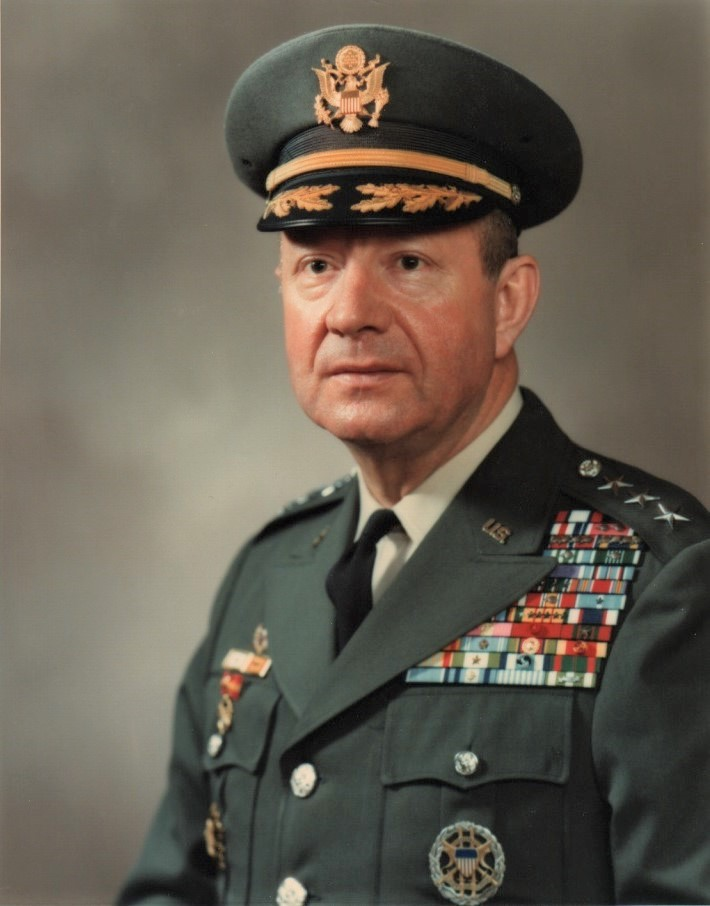
Lt. Gen. William E. Potts

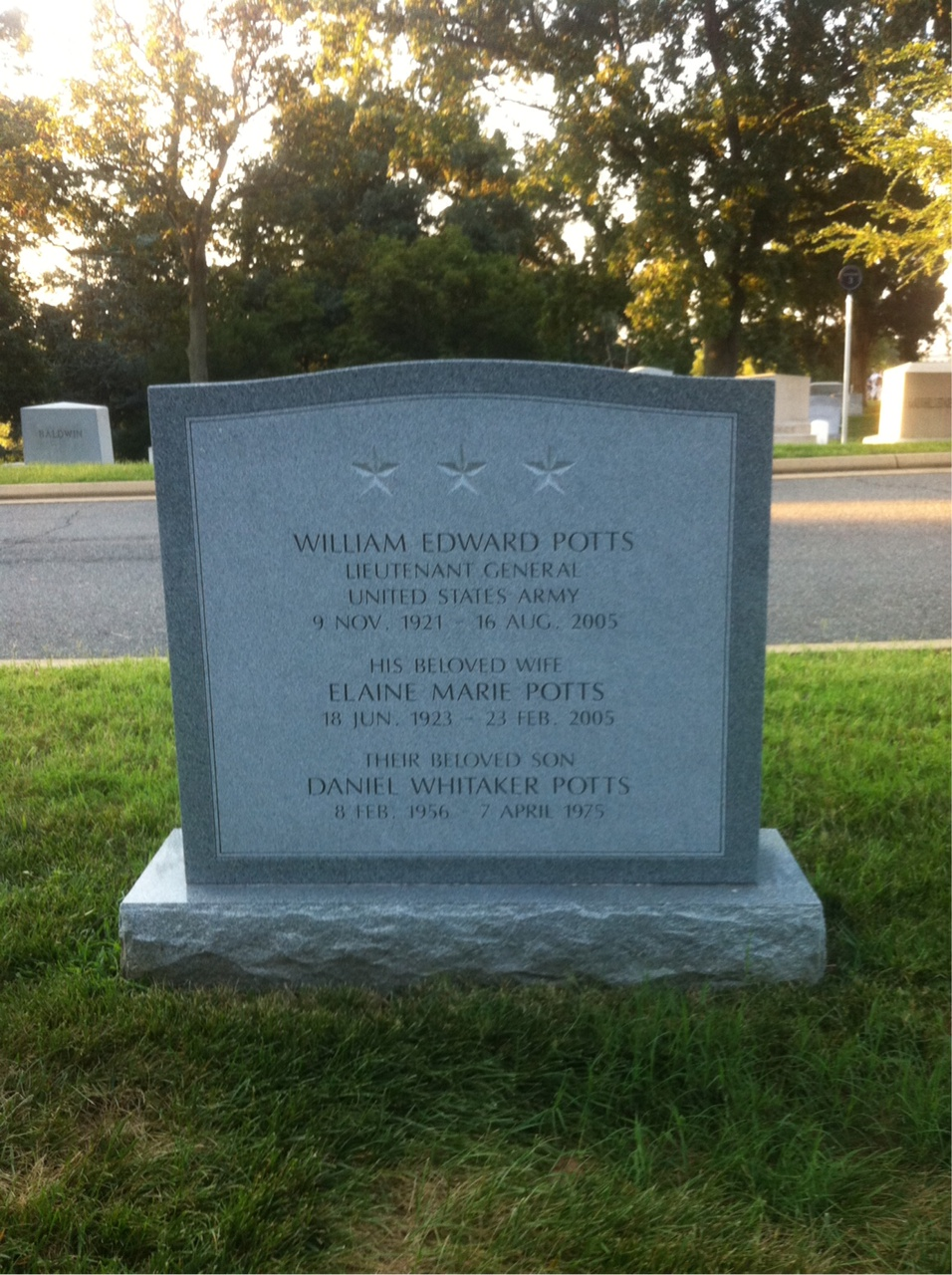
Grave at Arlington National Cemetery

William E. Potts (November 9, 1921 – August 16, 2005) was an American military general.

== Early life and World War II ==
William Edward Potts was born on 9 November 1921 in Oklahoma City, Oklahoma. He attended the Oklahoma Military Academy (now named Rogers State University) and was the highest ranking graduate in 1941. In 1942 he was commissioned as a cavalry 2nd lieutenant in the U.S. Army. Lieutenant Potts entered active duty at Fort Riley, Kansas, and completed the Officers' Basic course at the United States (U.S.) Army Cavalry School.

On 2 February 1943 Lieutenant Potts was assigned to the 2nd Armored Cavalry (Mechanized) Regiment and sent to Europe. He served as a platoon leader and then commanding officer of Troop B. On 13 September 1944 Potts was transferred to the 42nd Mechanized Cavalry Reconnaissance Squadron stationed near Coincourt, France. He was wounded by a mine while leading a raid to take the town and spent over a year in the hospital and physical therapy.

== Post World War II ==
On 10 October 1945 Major Potts was assigned to the Staff and Faculty, U.S. Army Armored School, Fort Knox, Kentucky. On 10 February 1946 Captain Potts was sent to attend the Command and General Staff School (College) at Fort Leavenworth, Kansas. After completing his studies he was sent to Korea as the Assistant G-3 (Operations) for Headquarters, XXIV Corps and U.S. Army Forces, Korea.

In January 1949 he was again assigned to the Staff and Faculty of the Armor School, Fort Knox, Kentucky and then attended the Officers' Advanced Course. After graduating in June 1950, he was assigned to the Army General Staff, Office of the Assistant Chief of Staff, G-2 in Washington, D.C. In June 1953 he was sent back to Korea and the Commanding Officer, 72nd Tank Battalion, 2nd Infantry Division. In April 1954 Potts was reassigned as a G-3 advisor to the First Republic of Korea (ROK) Army.

Returning to the United States in November 1954, Potts was assigned as Deputy Director, Combat Developments, Armored School and Center, Fort Knox, Kentucky. He remained in this position until attending the Armed Forces Staff College in Norfolk, Virginia, July 1957. After graduating in January 1958, he was assigned to command the 3rd Battalion, 14th Armored Cavalry Regiment and subsequently the 14th Armored Cavalry Regiment, both in Germany. In September 1959 he was reassigned to Assistant Chief of Staff, G-3, VII Corps, in Germany.

== Vietnam War ==
In September 1960, Colonel Potts returned to the U.S. to attend the National War College, Fort McNair, Washington, D.C. After graduating in June 1961 he was a moderator for the National Defense Strategy Seminar in July and then assigned to the Office, Assistant Chief of Staff for Intelligence, Department of the Army. In this position Potts was Chairman of a Department of the Army Committee on Counterinsurgency, served on the Rosson Board for Special Warfare, and traveled extensively through Laos and Vietnam.

Potts was assigned to the Office of the Secretary of Defense for Duty with the United States Representative to the North Atlantic Treaty Organization (NATO) Military Committee and Standing Group in July 1962. In May 1965, Potts was selected as the first Assistant Chief of Staff, G-3, for the United States Army, Vietnam. In February 1966 Potts was assigned as Deputy Chief of Staff for Personnel and Administration and as Special Assistant to the Commanding General, United States Army, Vietnam.

Colonel Potts returned to the United States in August 1966 and assigned as the Chief of Staff, United States Army Security Agency and after promotion to Brigadier General, assumed the duties of Assistant Chief of Staff, G-2, for the Commander in Chief, United States Army Pacific in September 1967. In February 1969 General Potts was transferred to Vietnam as the Assistant Chief of Staff, J-2, United States Military Assistance Command, Vietnam (USMACV).

In September 1972 General Potts returned to the United States as the Assistant Chief of Staff for Intelligence, Department of the Army and on 2 August 1973 was assigned as the Deputy Director, Defense Intelligence Agency, Department of Defense. Lieutenant General Potts retired from active duty on 31 August 1974.

== Post-retirement ==
Following his retirement, Potts worked for General Research Corporation as a project manager where he contributed to the Indochina Refugee Authored Monograph Program regarding the Vietnam War. Other projects included a comparative analysis of US/USSR capabilities to project power as well as a study of Concealment and Deception for Amphibious Operations during the Midrange (1985–1990). Potts later worked for Electrospace Systems Incorporated where he continued to work on projects related to military intelligence and counterintelligence. He died on 16 August 2005 and is buried in Arlington National Cemetery.

== Education ==
Potts earned an Associate of Arts degree from the Oklahoma Military Academy in 1941 and completed a Bachelor of Science degree at the University of Maryland in 1952. He later received a Master of Arts degree from the George Washington University School of Government in 1955 and a second Master of Arts degree in international affairs from George Washington University in 1962. Potts graduated from the Armed Forces Staff College in 1958, the National War College in 1961 and the Advanced Management Program at Harvard University in 1965.

== Promotions ==
Potts received a wartime promotion from 2nd lieutenant to lieutenant colonel during World War II. He was named 1st lieutenant 9 Nov 1945, captain, 1 Jul 1948, major, 6 Jul 1954, lieutenant colonel, 27 Aug 1962, colonel, 7 Jul 1967, brigadier general 26 Oct 1967, major general 29 Dec 1970, lieutenant general, Aug 1973.

== Awards ==
Potts' awards included: Distinguished Service Medal with Oak Leaf Cluster, Silver Star, Legion of Merit with two Oak Leaf Clusters, Bronze Star with four Oak Leaf Clusters and V Clasp, Air Medal with four Oak Leaf clusters, Joint Service Commendation Medal with one Oak Leaf Cluster, Army Commendation Medal with one Oak Leaf Cluster, Purple Heart, French National Order of the Legion of Merit (Rank of Officer), French Croix-de-Guerre with Silver Star, Republic of China Special Cravat of the Order of Cloud and Banner, Thailand Knight Grand Cross of the Most Exalted Order of the White Elephant, Philippine Outstanding Achievement Medal, National Order of Vietnam Fourth Class, Vietnam Armed Forces Honor Medal First Class, Vietnam National Police Honor Medal First Class, Korean Order of Military Merit (Chungmu), Korean Chungmu Distinguished Service Medal with Gold Star, Vietnam Civil Actions Medal First Class, Vietnam Military Social Service Honor Medal First Class, Vietnam Navy Service Medal Honor Class, Republic of Korea Presidential Citations, American Campaign Medal, European-African-Middle East Campaign Medal, World War II Victory Medal, Army of Occupation Medal, National Defense Service Medal with Oak Leaf Cluster, Korean Service Medal, Armed Forces Expeditionary Medal (Laos), Vietnam Service Medal, United Nations Service Medal, Vietnam Campaign Medal, and Vietnam Gallantry Cross Citation with Palm.
