= 207th Military Intelligence Brigade =

207th Military Intelligence Brigade (Theater)
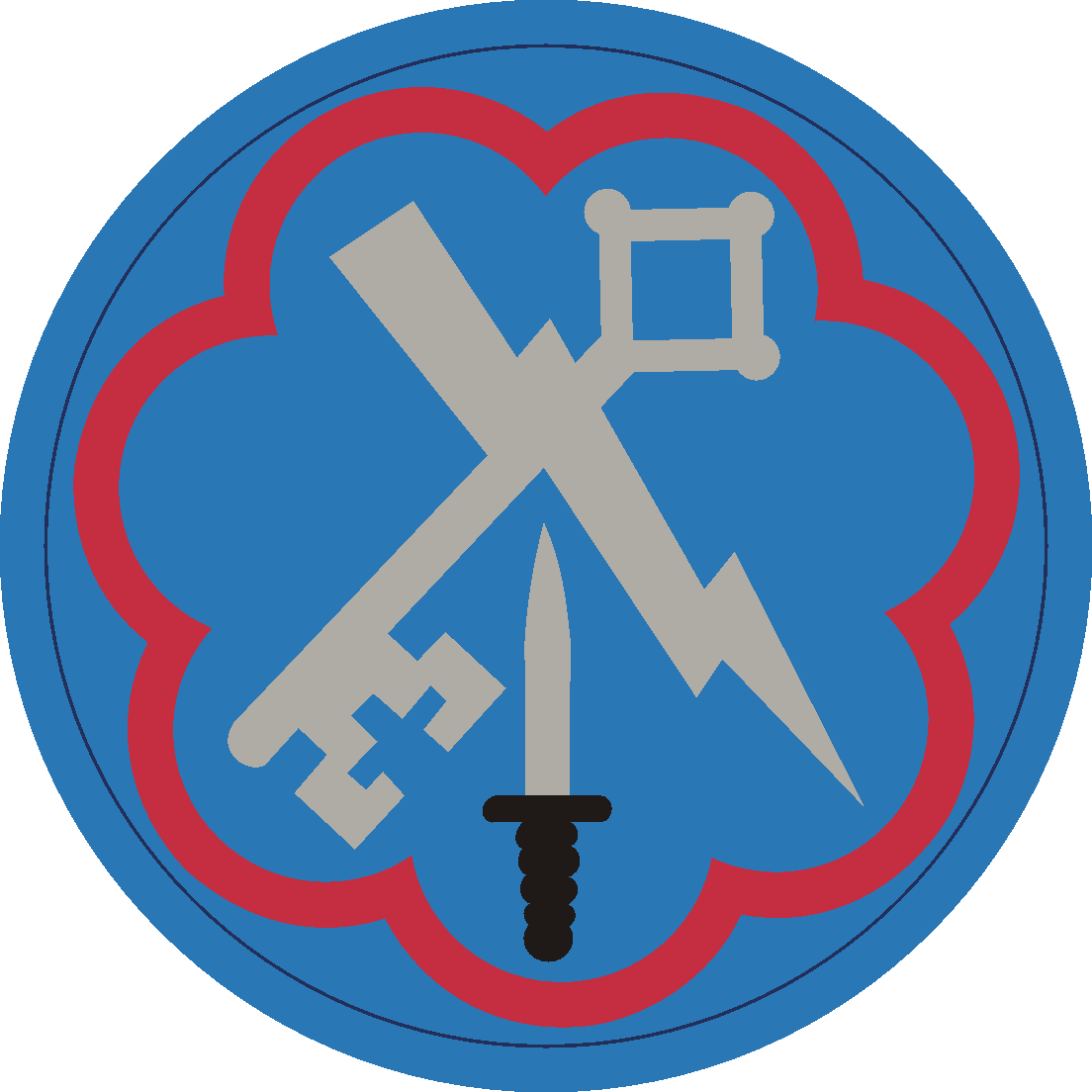
- 207th MIB shoulder sleeve insignia
- Active: 1946–1992; 2016–Present
- Country: United States
- Branch: United States Army
- Type: Military Intelligence
- Role: Provide intelligence analysis and collection support to USARAF and AFRICOM
- Part of: Southern European Task Force, Africa
- Garrison/HQ: Caserma Ederle, Vicenza, Italy
- Engagements: Operation Desert Shield and Operation Desert Storm
- Decorations: Meritorious Unit Commendation

Commanders
- Commander: COL Stephen T. Skells
- Command Sergeant Major: CSM Daryl G. McNeil

Insignia
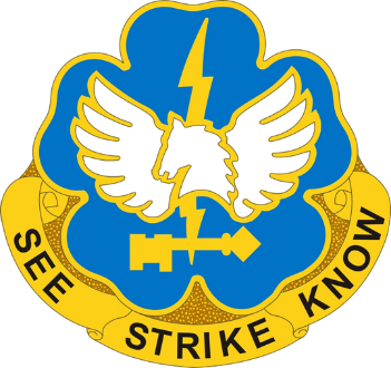
- Distinctive unit insignia of the brigade

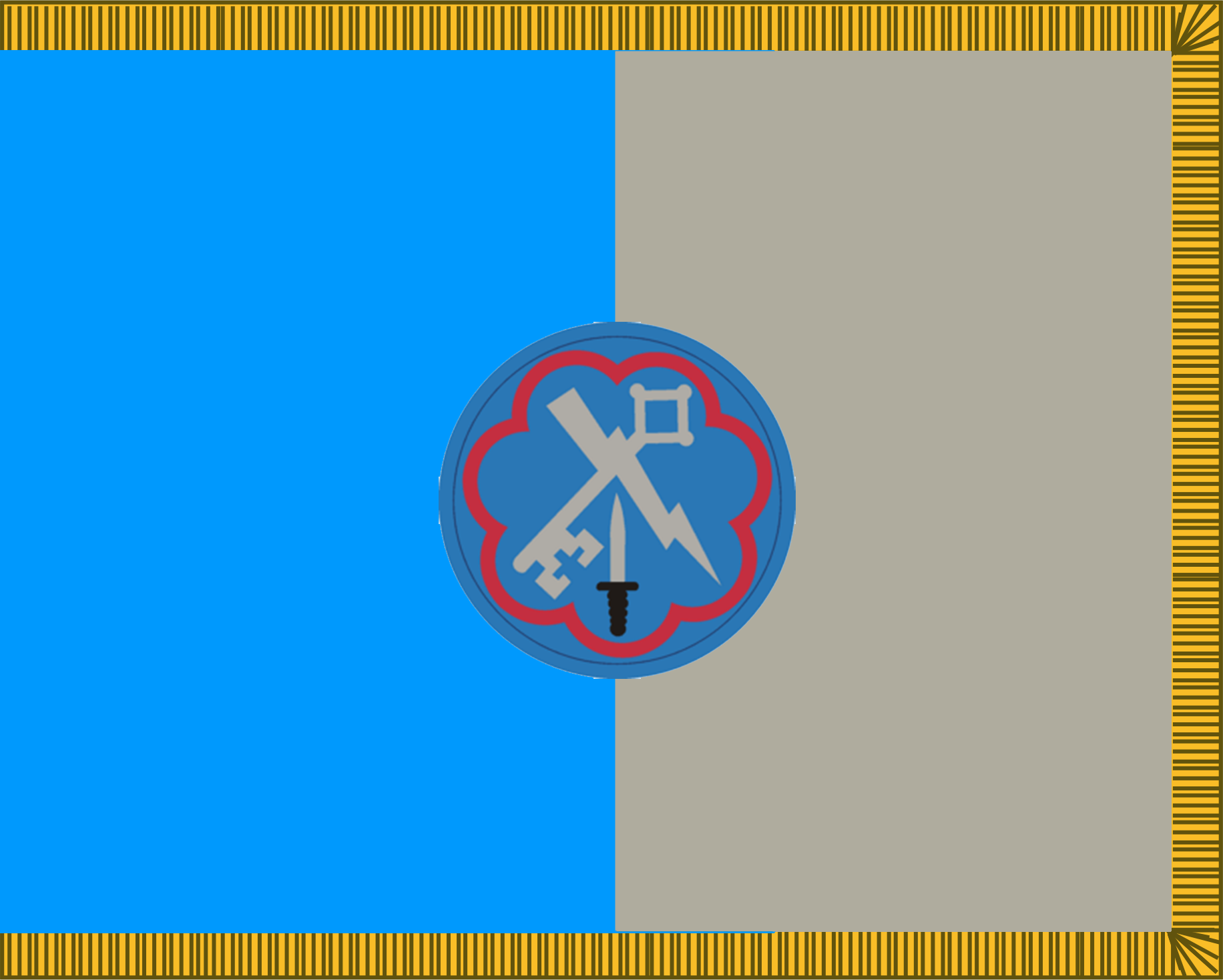
- 207th Military Intelligence Brigade Flag

The 207th Military Intelligence Brigade (Theater) (207th MIB (T)) is a military intelligence brigade of the United States Army Intelligence and Security Command that conducts intelligence collection and exploitation in support of U.S. Army Africa (USARAF) and U.S. Africa Command (AFRICOM) in order to set the intelligence architecture for the theater, disrupt transnational and trans-regional threats, and promote regional stability in Africa while building and maintaining intelligence readiness. The 207th MIB is the first theater intelligence brigade dedicated solely to Africa.

== History ==
The 207th Military Intelligence Brigade was constituted May 10, 1946, in the Army of the United States as the 113th Counterintelligence Corps Detachment. It was activated May 20, 1946, in Chicago, Illinois. On December 6, 1950, the unit was allotted to the regular Army. On August 1, 1957, it was designated as the 113th Counterintelligence Corps Group. July 25, 1961, marked the reorganization of 113th as the 133rd Intelligence Corps Group and years later designated as the 113th Military Intelligence Group on October 16, 1983. The 113th was consolidated with the 207th Military Intelligence Detachment, then reorganized as Headquarters and Headquarters Detachment, 207th Military Intelligence Group. Two years later on October 16, 1985, the unit was restructured as the Headquarters and Headquarters Detachment, 207th Military Intelligence Brigade. During this time, the 207th was assigned to the VII Corps and served in Operation Desert Shield/Storm. On January 15, 1992, the unit was inactivated in Germany. The unit was re-activated on March 16, 2016, at Caserma Ederle, Vicenza, Italy, as the new Military Intelligence Brigade (Theater) in support of AFRICOM and USARAF.

== Composition ==
The current composition of the brigade is;

- Headquarters and Headquarters Company, at Caserma Ederle, Vicenza, Italy
- 307th Military Intelligence Battalion, at Caserma Ederle, Vicenza, Italy
- 337th Military Intelligence Battalion (Army Reserve, aligned), in Fort Sheridan, Illinois
- 522nd Military Intelligence Battalion, in Vicenza, Italy
