= 500th Military Intelligence Brigade (United States) =

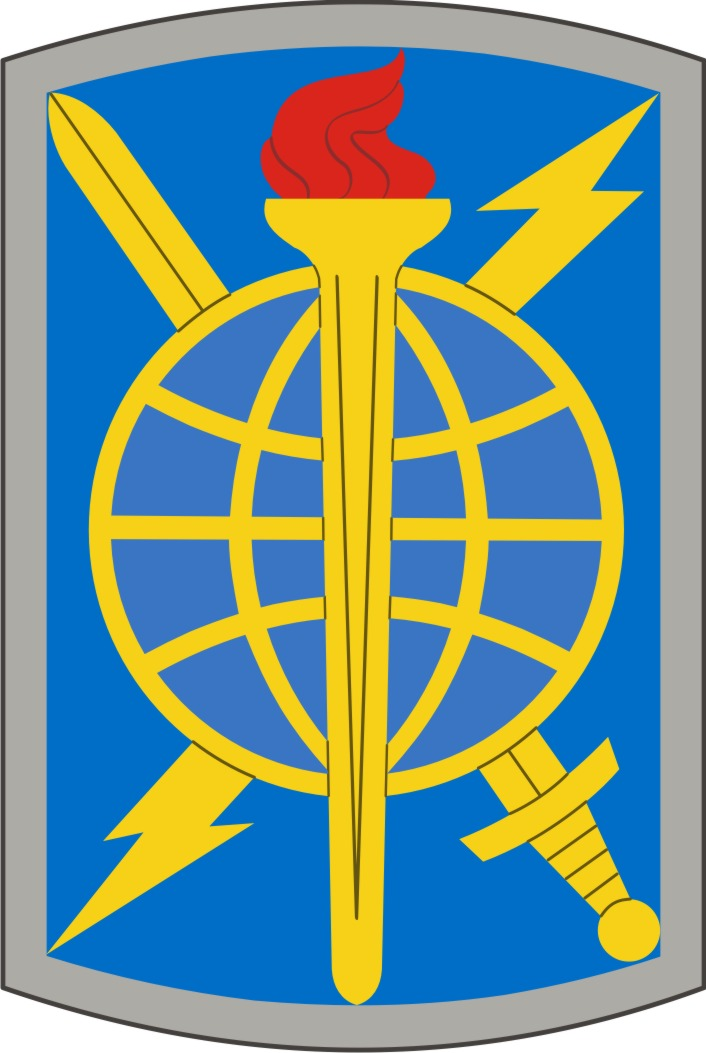
- 500th MI Brigade Shoulder Sleeve Insignia
- Country: United States
- Allegiance: United States Army Intelligence and Security Command
- Branch: United States Army
- Type: Military Intelligence
- Size: Brigade
- Part of: United States Army Pacific
- Garrison/HQ: Schofield Barracks
- Nickname: Pacific Vanguard
- Decorations: Meritorious Unit Commendation; Superior Unit Award

Commanders
- Commanding Officer: COL Shawn C. Callahan
- Brigade Command Sergeant Major: CSM Francisco J. Santiago Rivera

Insignia
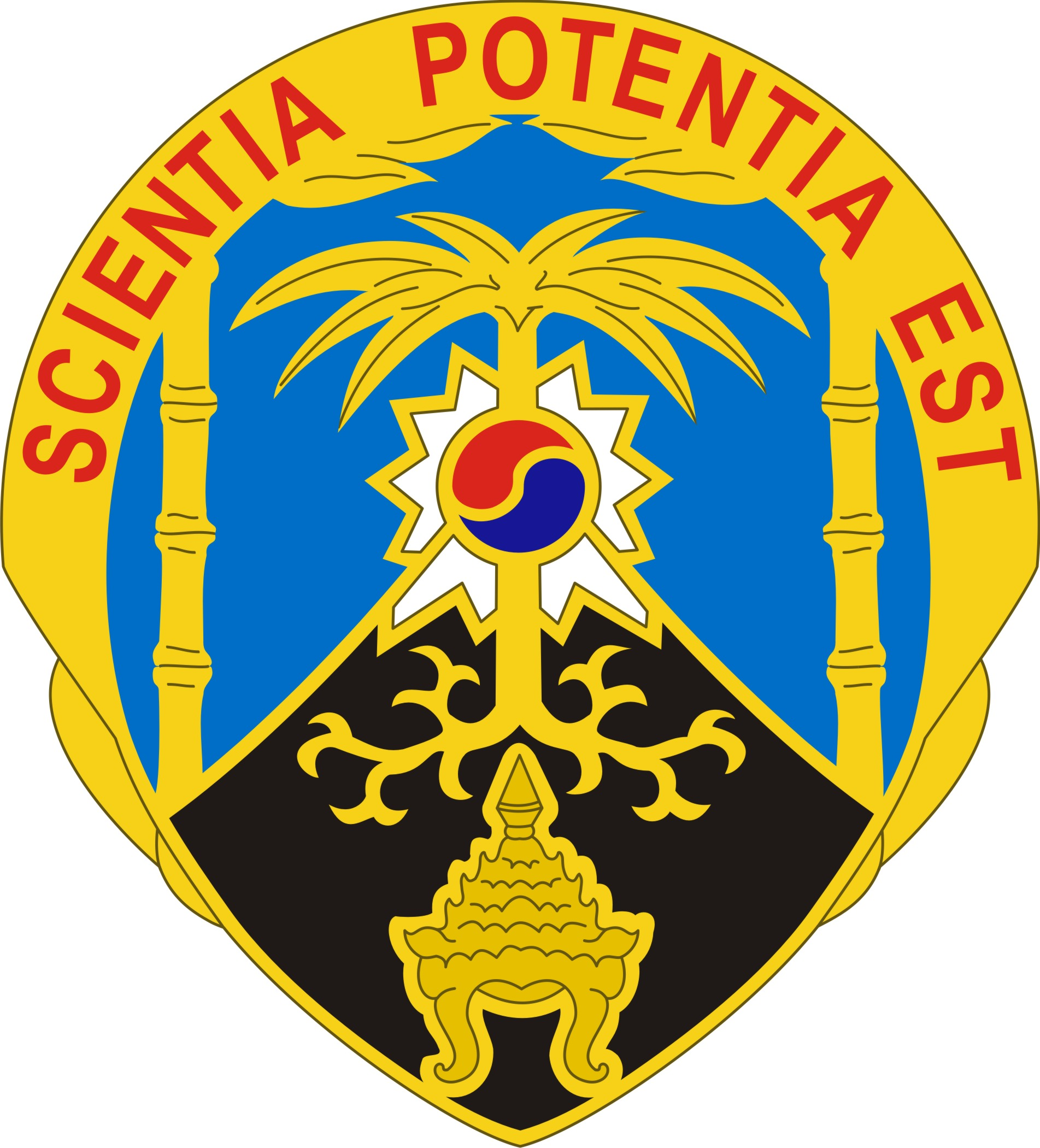
- Distinctive Unit Insignia

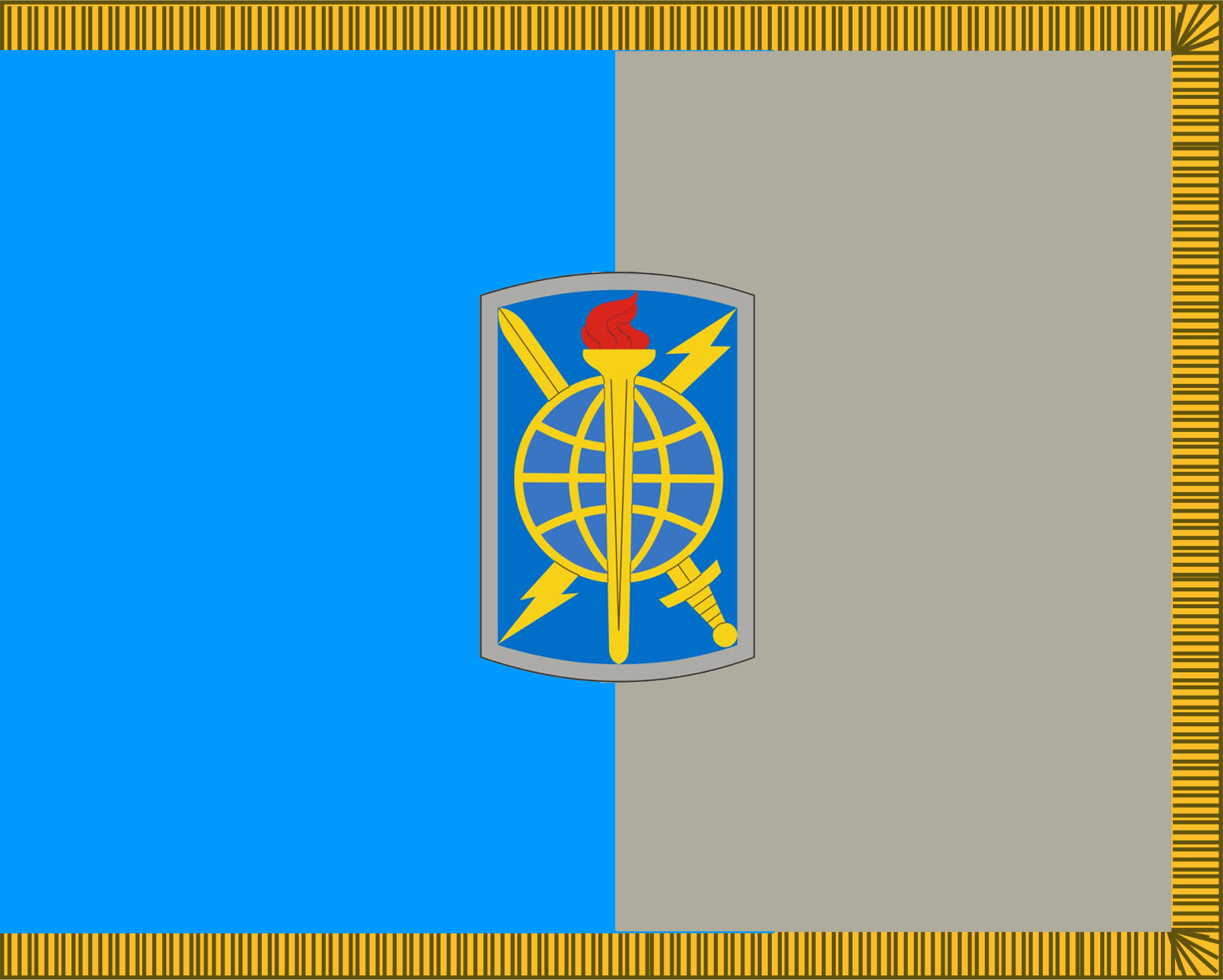
- 500th Military Intelligence Brigade Flag

The 500th Military Intelligence Brigade is a unit of the United States Army and subordinate to the U.S. Army Intelligence and Security Command. Its mission is to provide tailored, multi-disciplined intelligence and intelligence capabilities in support of USARPAC and other Commands, to defeat adversaries, promote regional stability, support partners and allies, and protect US interests. The 500th is headquartered at Schofield Barracks, Hawaii.

Fukuhara Hall, the 500th's HQ, is named for Col Harry K. Fukuhara, a Japanese-American Military Intelligence Hall of Fame inductee who served with the Military Intelligence Service during World War 2.

== History ==
The 500th Military Intelligence Service Group was stood up under the Far East Command in September 1952, serving as the successor to the joint Australian/American Allied Translator and Interpreter Section intelligence agency created to handle as a centralized allied intelligence unit in the Pacific Theater of Operations during World War 2.

As part of the drawdown of American troop strengths in Japan, relocating the Army's Pacific headquarters from Tokyo to Hawaii, the 500th was inactivated in 1957. The 500th Military Intelligence Group (Collection) was reactivated at Camp Asaka in March 1961, heading up all aspects of the HUMINT mission in the Pacific.

In 1965, the 500th MI relocated from Japan to Hawaii, and earned Meritorious Unit Commendations in 1968-69 and 1972-74 for its contributions to the Vietnam War, an unprecedented honor for a unit not located within a combat zone.

When the United States Army Intelligence and Security Command (INSCOM) was created in 1977, the 500th MI Group was reassigned as one of INSCOM's regional military intelligence groups.

The 500th MI continues to provide support to US Army Pacific and its predecessor the US Army Western Command to this day.

== Organization ==
- 500th Military Intelligence Brigade, at Schofield Barracks (HI)
  - Headquarters & Headquarters Company, at Schofield Barracks (HI)
  - 205th Military Intelligence Battalion, at Fort Shafter (HI)
  - 301st Military Intelligence Battalion, in Phoenix (AZ) (Army Reserve)
  - 311th Military Intelligence Battalion, (Forward Collection), at Camp Zama (Japan)
  - 341st Military Intelligence Battalion (Linguist), at Joint Base Lewis-McChord (WA) (Washington Army National Guard)
  - 715th Military Intelligence Battalion, (Signals Intelligence), at Schofield Barracks (HI)
