= List of people from Spencer, Indiana =

The following is a list of notable people associated with Spencer, Indiana. These people were born or lived in Spencer.

== Military ==
=== Army ===
- U.S. Army Captain David Enoch Beem was born in Spencer on 24 June 1837, the sixth of twelve children of Levi and Sarah (Johnson) Beem. He graduated from Indiana University at Bloomington in 1860 with a degree in law and was admitted to the bar in Owen County. Beem enlisted as a first sergeant in the Union army on 19 April 1861, and assisted in the organization of the first company raised in Owen County. Beem served in Company H, 14th Indiana Infantry Regiment. He was promoted to first lieutenant in August 1861, and to captain in May 1862. Beem fought at Rich Mountain, Cheat Mountain, the first battle of Kernstown, as well as at Antietam, Fredericksburg, Chancellorsville, Gettysburg, Spottsylvania Court House, Cold Harbor, and in other campaigns as part of the Union's Army of the Potomac. After three years of service, he mustered out of the military in June 1864.
- U.S. Army Colonel Scott S. Haraburda, a resident of Spencer, is a soldier, engineer, inventor, and author. As a soldier, he commanded the 464th Chemical Brigade and served as the lead logistics support officer in Kuwait to help fix the issues that caused the contingency contracting crisis identified from the Gansler Commission, later retiring in 2010 with the Legion of Merit. The following year, he was inducted into the Central Michigan University ROTC Hall of Fame. As an engineer, he made significant contributions into optimizing the designs of Helical-Coil Heat Exchangers (HCHE) and Microwave Rocket Thrusters. In 2001, he earned a doctorate in chemical engineering from Michigan State University. The National Society of Professional Engineers named Dr. Haraburda a Fellow in 2013; and from 2014 until 2015, he served as the president of the Indiana Society of Professional Engineers. As an inventor, he holds two United States patents and seven patent publications.
- U.S. Army General Thomas Alexander McNaught was born near Spencer on 8 September 1826, one of the eleven children of Thomas and Catherine (Bartholomew) McNaught. He enlisted in April 1846 into Company A, 3d Regiment, Indiana Volunteer Infantry, and left service in July 1847. When civil war broke out, he enlisted into Company A, 59th Indiana Infantry Regiment and elected captain after raising a company on 10 October 1861, rising in rank to become a brevetted Brigadier General on 4 August 1865 and ultimately taking command of the First Brigade of the Third Division in the Fifteen Army Corps. He took part in the siege of New Madrid, march to Iuka, movement to Milliken's Bend, Battle of Raymond, Battle of Jackson, Battle of Champion Hill, Black River, Lookout Mountain and Mission Ridge, Battle of Vicksburg, and Siege of Corinth. He participated in Sherman's March to the Sea from Dalton to Atlanta and the capture of Savannah. He died on 10 March 1919 and was buried in River Hill Cemetery, south of Spencer.

=== Navy ===
- U.S. Navy Admiral John Howard Cassady was born in Spencer on 3 April 1896 to William Franklin and Samantha Haxton Cassady. After attending Spencer High School, he went on to graduate from the U.S. Naval Academy in 1918 (Class of 1919). He was married to Sallie (née Dold), having two sons, John H. Jr. and William F. Cassady. During World War II in the Pacific Theater, he commanded the aircraft carrier USS Saratoga (CV-3), taking command from then Captain Mullinnix, in what is probably the only time in naval history that an officer relinquished command of a ship to another born from the same small town. He commanded the Saratoga until he was promoted to rear admiral in 1944. From May 1952 to March 1954, Admiral Cassady served as the commander of the United States Sixth Fleet followed by Commander in Chief Naval Forces Eastern Atlantic and Mediterranean until his retirement in May 1956. He died on 25 January 1969 and is buried with his wife in Arlington National Cemetery.
- U.S. Navy Rear Admiral Henry Maston Mullinnix was born on 4 July 1892 in Spencer to William Francis and Edith Estelle (née Prather) Mullinnix. After attending Attica High School, he went on to graduate from the U.S. Naval Academy in 1916, first in his class. During World War II in the Pacific Theater, he too commanded the aircraft carrier USS Saratoga (CV-3) from 7 April until 22 August 1943 when he was promoted to rear admiral and transferred to another carrier division. He was aboard the USS Liscome Bay (CVE-56) when it sank after being torpedoed by an enemy submarine on 24 November 1943, and later declared dead. His brother, Rear Admiral Allen Prather Mullinnix was born in 1898 in Attica, Indiana, and served with distinction during the war with commands of the USS Calvert (APA-32) and the USS Pensacola (CA-24), taking part in the Battle of Iwo Jima and the Battle of Okinawa, and retiring in 1947. In 1957, the destroyer USS Mullinnix (DD-944) was named in Henry's honor.

=== Air Force ===
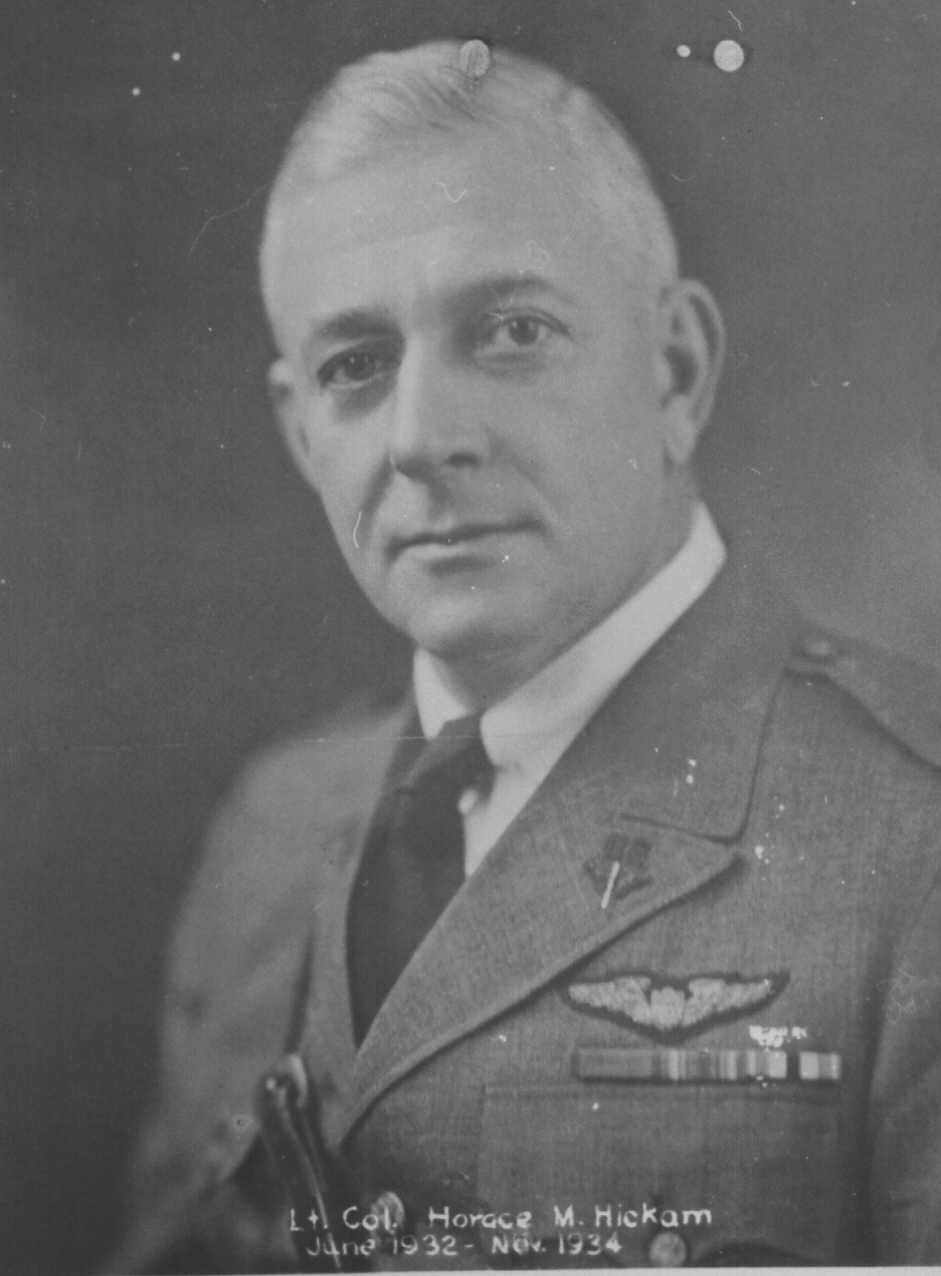
Lieutenant Colonel Hickam, who commanded the 3rd Attack Group from 1932 to 1934

- U.S. Army Air Corps Lieutenant Colonel Horace Meek Hickam was a famous pilot for the United States in the earlier half of the 20th century. The son of a lawyer, Hickam was born in Spencer on 14 August 1885, the eldest of four children. Hickam's association with aviation began with the United States' entry into World War I. He was involved in the Mexican Punitive Expedition. By the end of his career, he had achieved the rank of lieutenant colonel and received a Silver Star. Colonel Hickam was killed in a landing accident at Fort Crockett, Galveston, Texas, on 5 November 1934. His fame as being a pioneering figure in aviation and aerospace science eventually led to the naming of the United States Air Force Base in Hawaii, "Hickam AFB" in his honor.

== Other ==
- William S. Sadler, born in Spencer; surgeon, psychiatrist, and author
- Ernest M. Viquesney was born in Spencer on 5 August 1876, the only child of Alfred P. and Jane (née Lehman) Viquesney. He was a Spanish–American War veteran. In 1928, he built the Tivoli Theatre in Spencer. He was an American sculptor best known for his very popular World War I monument Spirit of the American Doughboy, one of which is located in front of the Owen County Courthouse. Shortly after the death of his second wife, Elizabeth "Betty" (née Sadler), he killed himself on 4 October 1946, the day after the thirteenth anniversary of the death of his first wife, Cora B. (née Barnes), all three buried at Riverside Cemetery in Spencer.
