= Gensler (disambiguation) =

Gensler is an American design and architecture firm that was founded by architect Art Gensler (1935–2021). The surname Gensler (or Gansler) may refer to:

== Artists and entertainers ==
- Jacob Gensler (1808–1845), German painter who specialized in genre scenes
- Bob Gansler (born 1941), Hungarian-born American soccer player and coach

== Politicians and government officials ==
- Doug Gansler (born 1962), former Attorney General of Maryland (2007–2015)
- Gary Gensler (born 1957), former chair of the U.S. Securities and Exchange Commission (2021–2025) and of the Commodity Futures Trading Commission (2009–2014)

== Military figures ==
- Jacques Gansler (1934–2018), former U.S. Under Secretary of Defense for Acquisition, Technology, and Logistics
  - Gansler Commission, chaired by Jacques Gansler, which investigated bribes in U.S. military contracting in 2004–2007
- Wilhelm Gänsler (1919–1985), highly decorated Luftwaffe NCO of World War II

== Other ==
- Ganslernhang, ski piste in Kitzbühel, Austria
