= 2006 Maryland Attorney General election =

- November 7, 2006
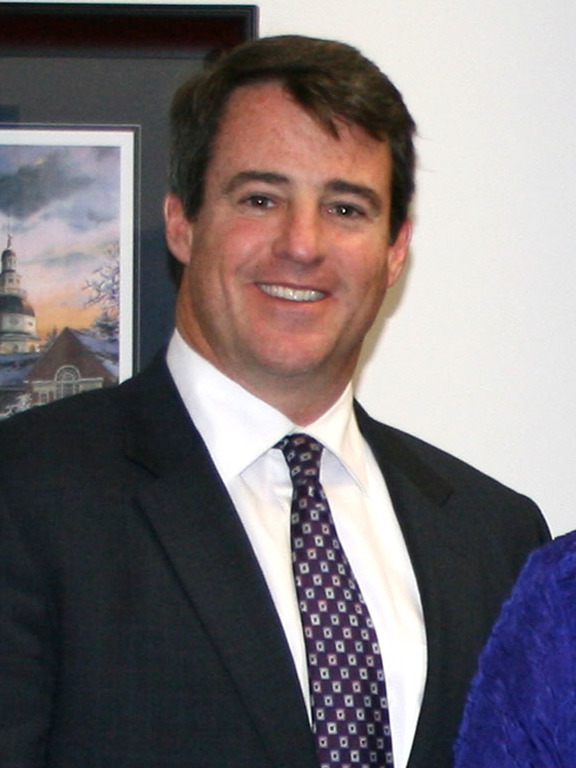

Nominee	Doug Gansler	Scott Rolle
Party	Democratic	Republican
Popular vote	1,043,458	665,433
Percentage	61.0%	38.9%
- Gansler: 50–60% 60–70% 70–80% 80–90% Rolle: 40–50% 50–60% 60–70%
Attorney General before election
J. Joseph Curran Jr.
Democratic
Elected Attorney General
Doug Gansler
Democratic

The 2006 Maryland Attorney General election was held on November 7, 2006. Incumbent Democratic Attorney General of Maryland J. Joseph Curran Jr. declined to seek a sixth term in office, prompted by his son-in-law, Martin O'Malley running for Governor and so wanting to avoid a conflict of interest. Montgomery County State's Attorney Doug Gansler won the Democratic primary to succeed Curran and faced off against Scott Rolle, the Frederick County State's Attorney who was unopposed in the Republican primary. Ultimately, Gansler defeated Rolle in a landslide and became the Attorney General of Maryland.

== Democratic primary ==
=== Candidates ===
- Doug Gansler, Montgomery County State's Attorney
- Stuart O. Simms, former Baltimore City State's Attorney

=== Campaign ===
As Gansler and Simms rolled out campaigns for attorney general, they were joined by Montgomery County Councilman Thomas Perez, who raised hundreds of thousands of dollars, rolled out endorsements from unions, and aired television ads before the Maryland Court of Appeals ruled that he did not meet the requirements to appear on the ballot as a candidate. Glenn Ivey, the Prince George's County State's Attorney, was rumored to be a possible candidate but ultimately declined to run. The Baltimore Sun announced its endorsement of Simms, declaring, "Mr. Gansler lacks Mr. Simms' breadth of experience and moderate temperament that is better suited for this critical role." In the end, Gansler was able to comfortably defeat Simms and was able to win every county in the state except for Baltimore County and Baltimore City.

=== Results ===
Democratic Primary results
Party	Candidate	Votes	%
Democratic	Doug Gansler	286,016	55.68
Democratic	Stuart O. Simms	227,699	44.32
Total votes		513,715	100.00

== Republican primary ==
=== Candidates ===
- Scott Rolle, Frederick County State's Attorney

=== Results ===
Republican Primary results
Party	Candidate	Votes	%
Republican	Scott Rolle	179,054	100.00
Total votes		179,054	100.00

== General election ==
=== Polling ===
Source	Date	Gansler (D)	Rolle (R)
Baltimore Sun/Potomac Inc.	September 27, 2006	54%	26%

=== Results ===
Maryland Attorney General election, 2006
Party	Candidate	Votes	%	±%
Democratic	Doug Gansler	1,043,458	60.99%	−4.18%
Republican	Scott Rolle	665,433	38.90%	+4.14%
Write-ins		1,948	0.11%	
Majority		378,025	22.10%	−8.31%
Turnout		1,710,839		
Democratic hold		Swing		
