= Scott Haraburda =

Soldier, engineer and inventor from the USA

Scott Stanley Haraburda
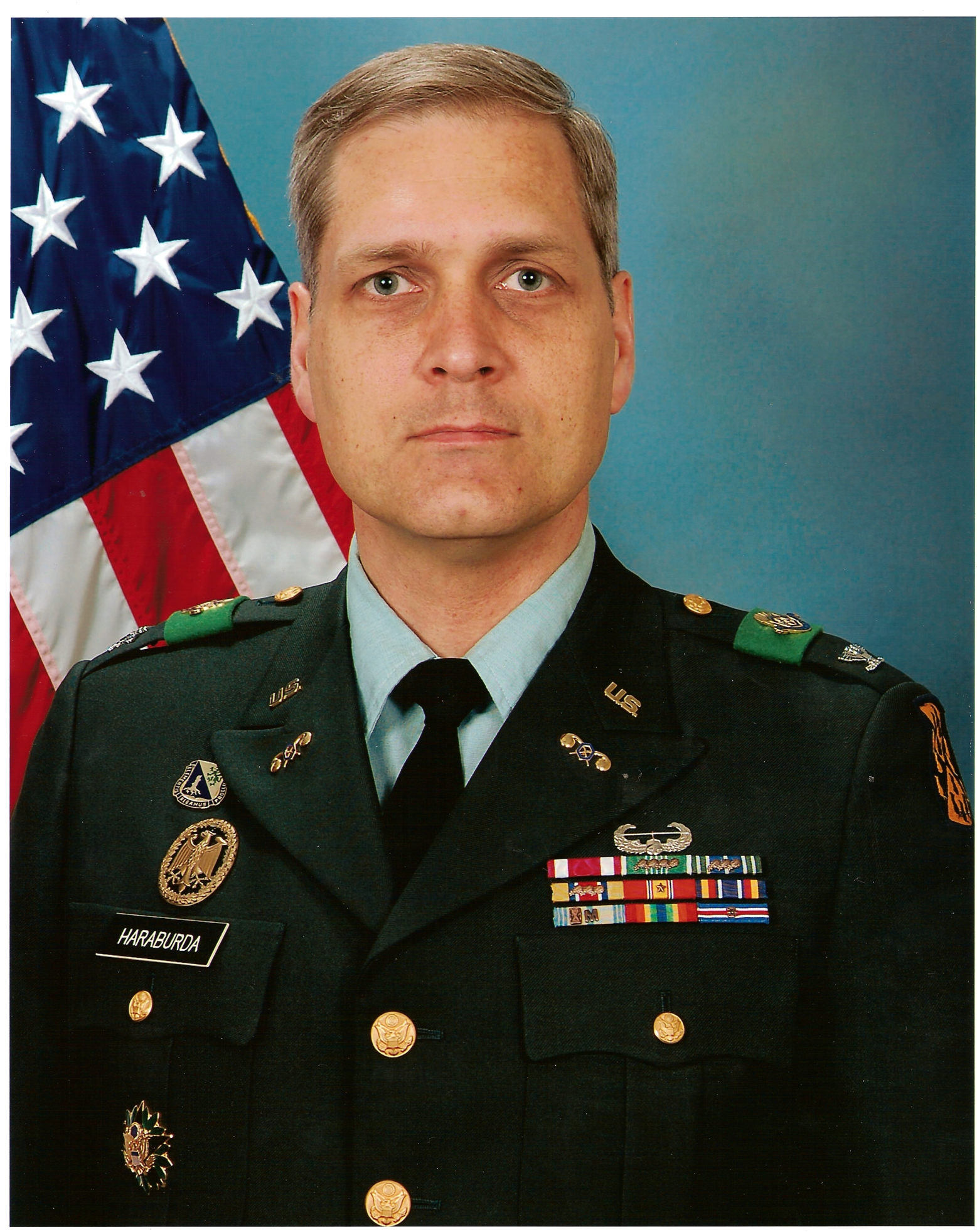
- 464th Chem. Bde command photo, April 2006
- Born: 1963 (age 62–63)
- Spouse: Marie A.(née Stressman) (m. 2010)
- Children: Ashlee, Beverly, Krystal, Jessica, Christine
- Scientific career
- Education: Grand Rapids Jr. Col.(AA); Central Michigan Univ (BS); Mich State Univ (MS, PhD)
- Awards: Fellow, NSPE; Hall of Fame, CMU ROTC; Dist. Alumnus, GRCC
- Thesis: Transport phenomena of flow through helium and nitrogen plasmas in microwave electrothermal thrusters (2001)
- Doctoral advisor: Martin C. Hawley
- Military career
- Allegiance: United States of America
- Branch: United States Army; Chemical Corps
- Service years: 1981–2010
- Rank: Colonel
- Commands: 472d Chem Bn; 464th Chem Bde
- Conflicts: GWOT - Kuwait
- Awards: Legion of Merit; Meritorious Svc Med
- Sports career
- Sport: Judo, 2nd dan
Medal record
Hoosier State Games (Indiana)
Gold medal – first place	1998	Men's Master Middleweight

Scott Stanley Haraburda (born 1963) is an American soldier, engineer, inventor, and 2nd dan judoka. In addition to making key contributions to the development of heat exchangers and spacecraft propulsion, he led a team of military officers in 2007 to Kuwait to correct many of the contingency contracting problems identified by the Gansler Commission. He is known nationally as the president of the Indiana Society of Professional Engineers who led the opposition to a state governmental panel recommendation in 2015 to eliminate licensing of engineers in Indiana.

== Early life ==
Scott Haraburda grew up in Grand Rapids, Michigan, where he graduated from Creston High School in 1981 and then from Grand Rapids Junior College. In 2017, this college named Scott its distinguished alumnus for the year. While living in Grand Rapids, he worked as the department store Santa for Herpolsheimer's, the same store mentioned in the 2004 Christmas film The Polar Express.

== Career ==
=== Military ===
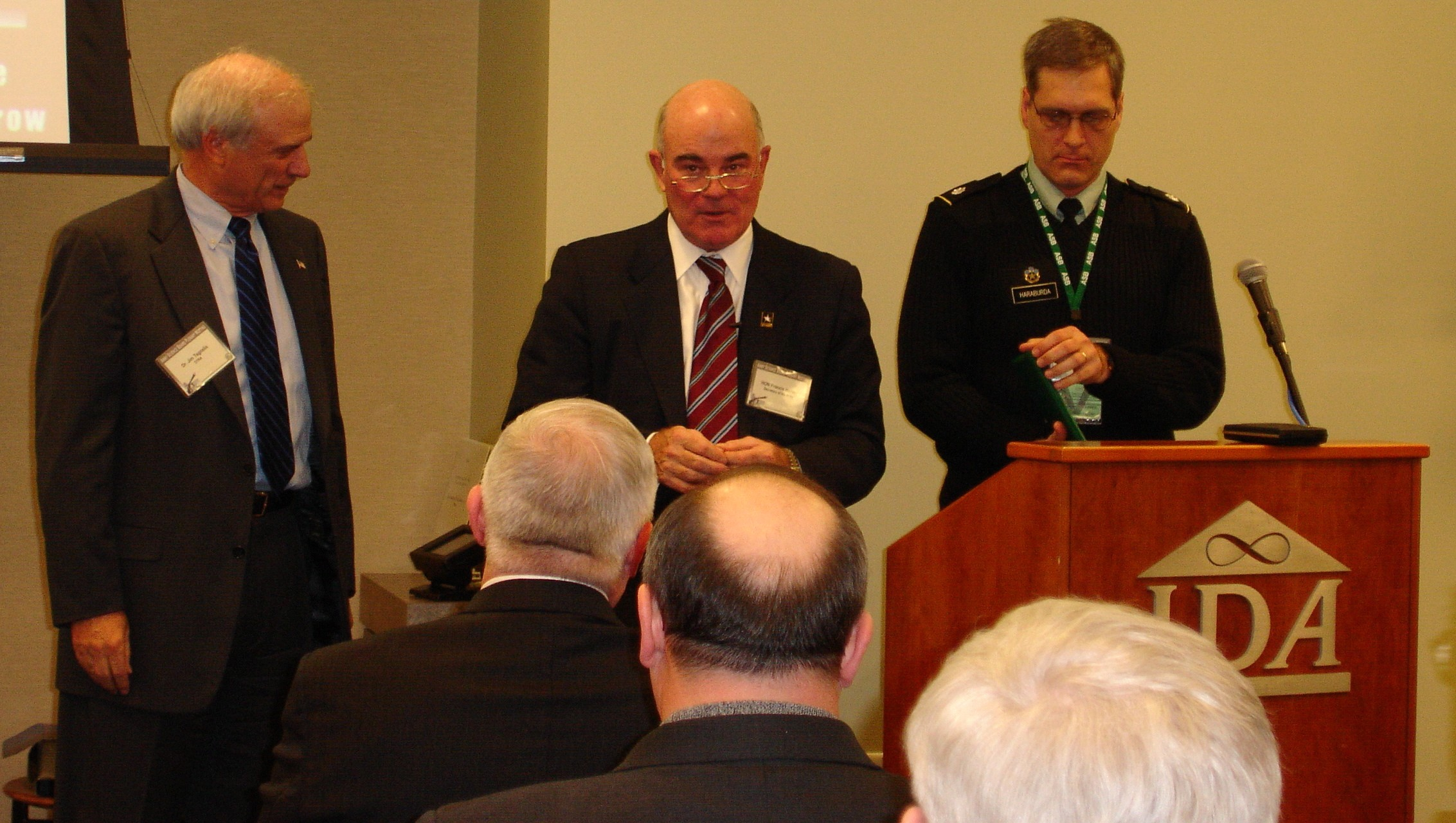
Army Secretary Harvey (center) presents an award to Dr. Tegnelia (left) as LTC Haraburda (right) reads the citation in 2005. (ASB Photo Archives.)

Colonel Scott S. Haraburda spent nearly three decades serving in the US Army, providing significant contributions to military logistics, CBRNE defense, and military science. In 1991, while he was teaching chemistry at the United States Military Academy, the Army Astronaut Nomination Selection Board nominated Haraburda as a NASA astronaut candidate. A few years later, by means of a competitive selection at the rank of Major, he served as a representative of the United States to Germany in 1995 through the Army Reserve's Foreign Exchange Program with the Bundeswehr, Germany's army. In 2005, he served as the Executive Secretary of the Army Science Board, helping its distinguished members of corporate executive managers, senior academians, and retired military flag officers formulate recommendations to scientific and technological matters of concern to the Army.

==== Military Logistics ====
In late 2007, Colonel Haraburda deployed to Kuwait for a year to help correct the contingency contracting problems plaguing the war zone. The Army deployed him to Camp Arifjan to lead a small military team of logistics officers in applying the LOGCAP methods as part of the Gansler Report's second recommendation solution. (Note: In early 2007, several problems involving contingency contracting surfaced, such as the problems that surrounded the high-visibility Cockerham bribery case, along with the suicides of senior-level contracting and logistics professionals. In August, United States Secretary of the Army, Pete Geren, established an independent commission to review recent operations and provide recommendations. This commission released what became known as the Gansler Report in October 2007. The second of the four key improvements involved the organizational restructure and change of responsibilities for contingency contracting.)

==== CBRNE Defense ====
As the commander of the 472d Chemical Battalion from 2002 through 2004 with the rank of Lieutenant Colonel, he integrated his units' training with civilian agencies, such as fire departments, police stations, hospitals, and non-governmental organizations (e.g., American Red Cross) to improve the Defense Support of Civil Authorities capabilities for large-scale chemical defense missions. As a result, he was the first commander selected to provide operational command and control over nearly 400 Chemical, Biological, Radiological, Nuclear and high- yield Explosives (CBRNE) defense soldiers in Operation Red Dragon in 2004. (Note: As a result of the 1995 sarin gas attack on a Tokyo subway and the growing concern about a terrorist chemical attack, the U.S. Congress passed laws to implement a program to train civilian agencies on responding to incidents involving chemical agents.) While commander of the 464th Chemical Brigade from 2006 to 2007, Colonel Haraburda provided command and control over the same exercise in 2006, this time commanding over 1,100 chemical, military police, and medical soldiers. (Note: Colonel Haraburda laid the groundwork for future training efforts with non-military organizations as part of the Defense Support of Civil Authorities for large-scale chemical defense missions, which grew to over 3,000 soldiers with ten civilian hospitals in 2009 and to include foreign contributions with Canadian soldiers in 2014.) Another major contribution he provided to CBRNE soldiers was his recommendations on ways to improve their leadership capabilities, using ideas he derived from his various military leadership assignments and theories learned as a graduate of the Army War College and the Army Command and General Staff College, military colleges that prepare officers for senior leadership assignments and responsibilities. (Note: Colonel Haraburda's leadership recommendations were specifically in the areas of: accomplishing tasks, using data, leading people, communicating information, solving problems, and making decisions: Task (Cannot have all three: cheaper, better, and faster; Accomplishing the task more important than the tools; Plan and sacrifice now for the sake of the future; and Implement plans); Data (Use metrics needed to make decisions; Understand the source of the data; Avoid meaningless goals; and Challenge your assumptions); Personnel (Tasks begins and ends with people; Reward good performers and remove bad performers; Train your successor; and You cannot please everyone); Communication (Consensus decision usually results in a weak decision; ensure meetings are short, infrequent, and value-added; Communicate mission results—good and bad; and Communicate good statements); Problem Solving (Today's problems came from yesterday's solutions; The cure may be worse than the disease; Dominate technology and do not let it dominate you; and, Solve problems and not symptoms); and Decision Making (Doing the right thing is better than doing things right; 'Better' is the enemy of 'good enough'; Resources mean nothing if they are not used; and If it "ain't broke," strive to maintain or improve it).)

=== Engineering ===
Haraburda Designs

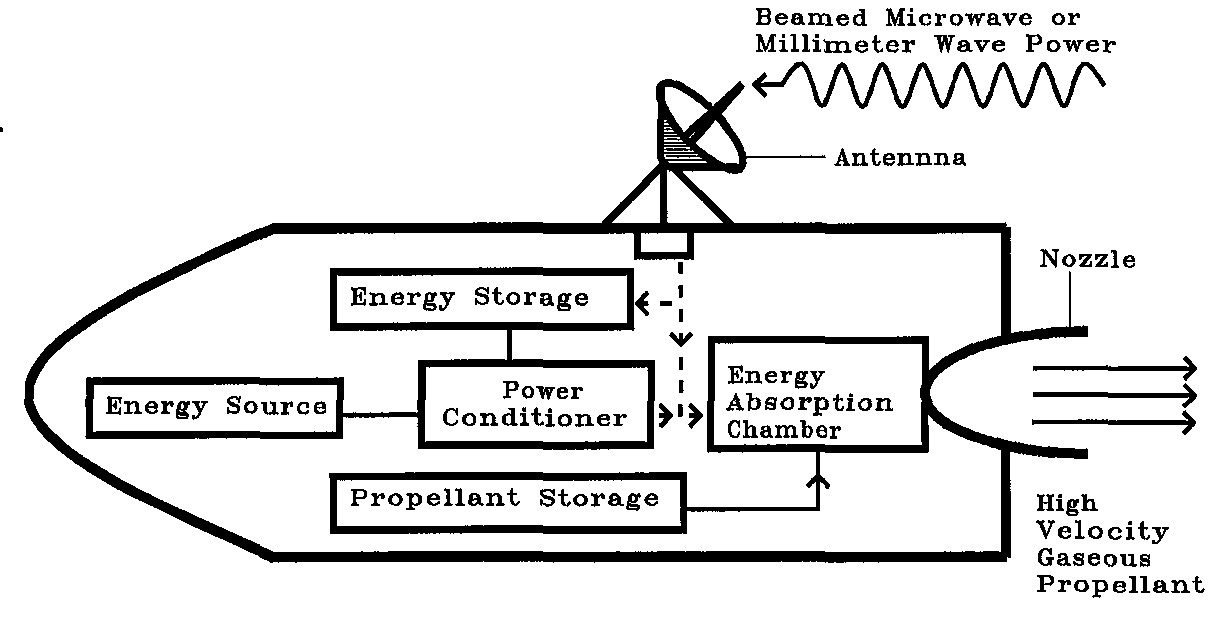

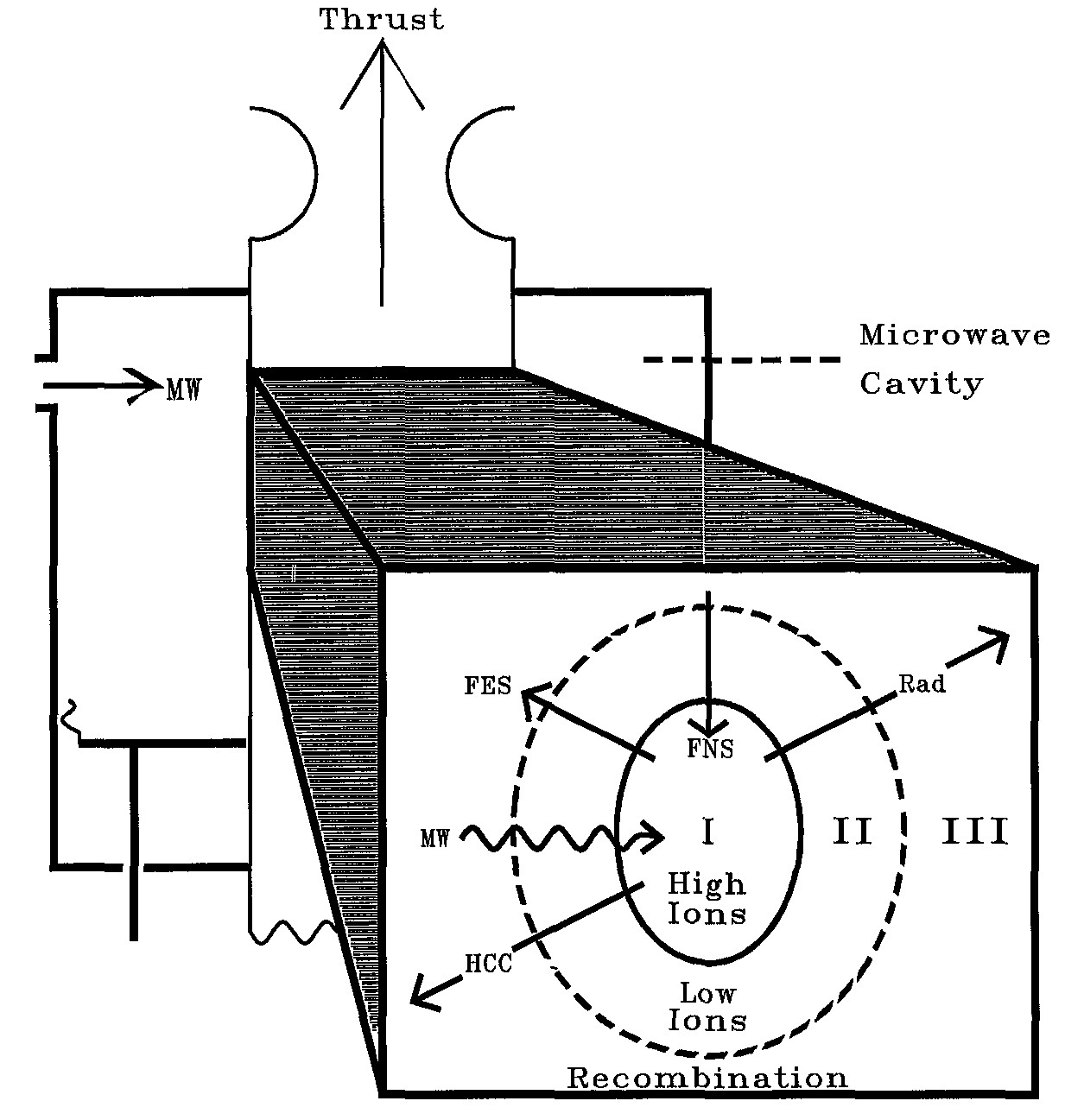

Microwave Electrothermal Thruster

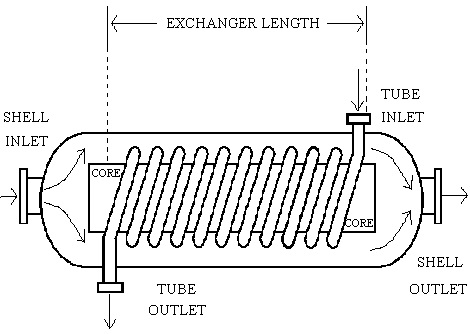
Helical-Coil Heat Exchanger

The National Society of Professional Engineers named Dr. Scott S. Haraburda a Fellow in 2013 in recognition for long-term service with the Society, as well as to the engineering profession and the community (an honor given to less than 1% of its members). And from 2014 until 2015, he served as the president of the Indiana Society of Professional Engineers (ISPE). While president of ISPE, he publicly led an effort to oppose a state governmental panel recommendation in 2015 to eliminate licensing of engineers in the State of Indiana, causing Governor Mike Pence to soon issue a statement opposing the recommendation as well. Furthermore, in 2001, he earned a doctorate in chemical engineering from Michigan State University.

==== Plastics ====
As an inventor, he holds two United States patents and seven patent publications. One of Dr. Haraburda's patents involved a measurement system to be used in the plastics industry, which he used in a project identified by Chemical Processing magazine with its Project of the Year award in 1998 as one of the best projects in the chemical industry. (Note: The other patent and patent publications involved unique information technology systems, specifically Enterprise Resource Planning (ERP) systems within a manufacturing environment.) In the 1990s, he worked as a plastics engineer for Bayer Corporation and General Electric Plastics.

==== Aerospace ====
Dr. Haraburda made significant contributions into optimizing the engineering designs of spacecraft propulsion and heat exchangers. In the early 1990s, he conducted research on a Microwave Electrothermal Thruster, to which he developed a simple equilibrium based theory of space-dependent parameters for transport design equations, using helium as the monatomic gas and nitrogen as the diatomic gas. (Note: Applying the Finite Element Method (FEM) within the plasma in a Batch Reactor model of the TM_{011} and TM_{012} electromagnetic resonance modes of a microwave cavity, he predicted the residence time of the reaction to equilibrium. With his data, he conducted many simulations on NASA's Two-Dimensional Kinetic (TDK) computer program to determine the effects on engine performance from pressure and energy changes along with propellant contamination. He determined that one should use a minimum power of 1 kWatt to obtain specific impulses greater than 1,000 lb_{f}*sec/lb. He also determined that fouling of the walls in the discharge chamber significantly reduces the amount of energy transferred to the propellant, thus reducing the rocket efficiencies.) In the mid-1990s, Dr. Haraburda also designed Helical-coil heat exchangers for fluids with components in multiple phases (solids, liquids, and gases). (Note: Normal heat exchangers tend to create mechanical problems during operations, such as plugging of small-diameter tubes. Cleaning of helical coils for these multiple-phase fluids can prove to be more difficult than its shell and tube counterpart; however the helical coil unit would require cleaning less often. There are several simple methods for designing HCHE for all types of manufacturing industries, such as using the Ramachandra K. Patil (et al.) method from India and the Haraburda method from the United States. However, these are based upon assumptions of estimating inside heat transfer coefficient, predicting flow around the outside of the coil, and upon constant heat flux.)

==== Munitions ====
Dr. Haraburda directed manufacturing and engineering for Crane Army Ammunition Activity.

== Personal life ==
=== Judo ===
In 1998, Scott won the Indiana Men's Master Middleweight Judo Championship title. Two years later, the United States Judo Association promoted him to black belt rank of Nidan (2nd dan).

== Bibliography ==
- Christian Controversies: Seeking the Truth ISBN 978-0988607200, Meaningful Publications, 2013.
- Premonitions of the Palladion Project ISBN 978-1435711150, LuLu Publishing, 2008.
