= Morogiello =

Morogiello is a surname. Notable people with the surname include:

- John Morogiello (born 1965), American playwright
- Dan Morogiello (born 1955), American baseball player
