= Isabel Pearse =

American actress

Isabel Althea Hussa Pearse (1912–1999) was an American actress who starred in theatre. She performed with the Montgomery Players at the Montgomery Playhouse in Montgomery County, Maryland. Pearse also performed at the Players Playhouse in Detroit, Michigan. She was a descendant of reformer Jan Hus.

== Early life and education ==
Pearse was born in Montclair, New Jersey to Theodore Hussa and Cora Warbutton Hussa on Oct. 26, 1912. Her father, Theodore Hussa, worked as a textile engineer and inventor. Pearse graduated from the Beard School (now Morristown-Beard School) in Orange, New Jersey in 1930. Pearse then studied acting under noted Russian actress Maria Ouspenskaya.

== Acting career and war service ==
Pearse acted for 40 years in roles in New York City, Detroit, Michigan, and Maryland. In 1944, she performed the role of Ruth in the play Blithe Spirit with the Montgomery Players. The performance earned her the Washington Critics Award for best actress. In 1957, Pearse performed in Edward Mabley's comedy Glad Tidings at the Players Clubhouse in Detroit. (The original version of the play ran on Broadway at the Lyceum Theatre in 1951.) She played the role of Maud Abbott. The book Detroit on Stage describes news coverage from the time that characterized her performance as "provocative, maddening, witty, and always decorative." During World War II, Pearse drove an ambulance for the American Red Cross.

== Family ==
In 1940, Pearse married Bearnard Paul Pearse. Bearnard Pearse, a graduate of the Wharton School at the University of Pennsylvania, served in the U.S. Navy.
