= Operation Red Dragon (civil defense exercise) =

Civil defense readiness exercise

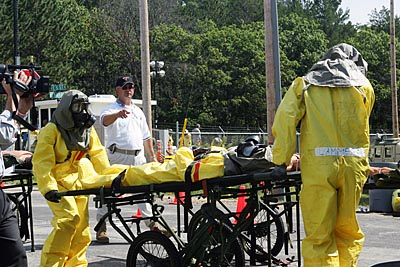
Sgt. Maj. Thomas DiNatale, Training / Operations sergeant major for the U.S. Army Reserve Command Homeland Defense, gives feedback during a Red Dragon training scenario, August 2006. (Photo by Rob Schuette)

Exercise Red Dragon is a recurring civil defense readiness exercise conducted in Fort McCoy, Wisconsin held during the summer, training Army Reserve, National Guard units, and civilian agencies, such as fire departments, police stations, hospitals, and non-governmental organizations (i.e. American Red Cross) to improve the Defense Support of Civil Authorities capabilities for large-scale chemical defense missions.

== History ==
As a result of the 1995 sarin gas attack on a Tokyo subway and the growing concern about a terrorist chemical attack, the U.S. Congress passed laws to implement a program to train civilian agencies on responding to incidents involving Weapons of Mass Destruction (WMD). In response, the U.S. Army Reserve Command's Homeland Defense Office, then under the direction of LTC Jon M. Byrom, US Army Reserve developed an annual exercise to integrate collective training with specialized HAZMAT protection and decontamination equipment for Army Reserve units with this homeland defense mission. This annual exercise began in 2004 when the 472d Chemical Battalion, under the command of Lieutenant Colonel Scott S. Haraburda, was selected to provide operational command and control over nearly 400 Chemical, Biological, Radiological, Nuclear and high- yield Explosives (CBRNE) defense soldiers. The following year, the exercise doubled in size to 800. In 2006, the 464th Chemical Brigade commanded this exercise, again under newly promoted Colonel Haraburda as the brigade commander, commanding over 1,100 chemical, military police, and medical soldiers, laying the groundwork for future training efforts with non-military organizations as part of the Defense Support of Civil Authorities for large-scale chemical defense missions. This exercise eventually grew to over 3,000 soldiers with ten civilian hospitals in 2009 and to include foreign contributions with Canadian soldiers in 2014.
