= Scott Rolle =

Circuit Court Judge in Frederick County, Maryland

Scott L. Rolle
- Born: June 30, 1961 (age 65); Washington, D.C.
- Occupations: lawyer, actor
- Known for: State's Attorney for Frederick County, MD (1995-2007)
- Military career
- Allegiance: United States of America
- Branch: United States Army; United States Army Reserve
- Rank: LTC
- Units: 200th Military Police Command; Judge Advocate General's Corps
- Conflicts: Iraq, 2008

Scott L. Rolle (born June 30, 1961) is an American Circuit Court Judge in Frederick County, Maryland. In a close election in late 2014, he was the first lawyer to defeat a sitting judge in Frederick County by way of election in modern history. From 1995 to 2007 Rolle was the State's Attorney for Frederick County, Maryland. He served three consecutive terms in that position. He is also an actor who co-starred on the television series Brad Meltzer's Decoded that was aired on the History Channel with 23 episodes spanning two seasons. He also landed a role on Lifetime Discovery Channel's "Twisted Fate", the independent films "Substance", "Money Matters" along with other film, television and stage acting credits. Rolle retired after 21 years as a lieutenant colonel in the US Army Reserves. He served in the 154th Legal Support Detachment, and the 2nd Legal Operations Detachment located in New Orleans, Louisiana. Rolle was mobilized and deployed to Afghanistan from October 2018 through April 2019 serving as the USFOR-A Chief Investigator for Gross Violations of Human Rights (Leahy Law). Upon completion of his tour of duty, he was awarded the Joint Commendation Medal with Combat "C" device, NATO non-article 5 medal, and the Afghanistan Campaign medal with bronze service star.

== Education and early career ==
He is a graduate of the University of Dayton (1984), the Ohio Northern University School of Law (1986) and the Federal Bureau of Investigation National Law Institute (1997).

Rolle has served as an adjunct professor of Criminal Law at Mount Saint Mary's University and Frederick Community College. He is a member of the Maryland State Bar Association, West Virginia Bar Association, and Bar Association of Frederick County, as well as the United States Federal District Court for Maryland and the United States Army Court of Criminal Appeals. Prior to becoming State's Attorney, Rolle was in private practice from 1991 to 1994 and again from 2007 to 2014. He had earlier served as Assistant State's Attorney (chief narcotics prosecutor) for Frederick County.

== Frederick County State's Attorney and private practice ==
Rolle was the youngest State's Attorney elected in Maryland at the time of his victory in 1994. He defeated a long-term incumbent and was subsequently re-elected twice for a total of three terms. In 2006, Rolle was recruited by Governor Robert Ehrlich and Lieutenant Governor Michael Steele to run for Maryland Attorney General on the Republican ticket. Despite winning 17 of Maryland's 23 counties, Rolle lost to Democrat Douglas Gansler in what was considered a hard-fought race.

As State's Attorney, Rolle tried numerous high-profile criminal jury trials, obtaining convictions on all of them. In 1999, Rolle established a youthful offender program to identify at-risk youth early on and provide interventions. He established Maryland's first animal cruelty prevention and prosecution team to assist animal control officers in investigating and prosecuting animal cruelty cases. He also initiated a mediation project in an effort to keep minor criminal cases from clogging up the court system. He has been recognized with many awards for his work as a prosecutor including awards for his work fighting animal cruelty, advocating victim's rights, and his efforts to combat domestic violence.

After leaving the State's Attorney's office in 2007, Rolle began his own law firm, the Law Offices of Scott L. Rolle, LLC, located in Frederick, Maryland. The firm handled Criminal Defense cases, personal injury/auto accidents, domestic relations, business law, and wills and estates. He served as defense counsel in many high-profile criminal matters around the state of Maryland. In late 2009, Rolle successfully defended a Washington County man charged with first-degree murder. After a weeklong trial, the man was acquitted of first and second degree but guilty of manslaughter. In February 2011, Rolle successfully defended a Pennsylvania man charged with first-degree murder. This man was also acquitted of first and third-degree murder, but convicted of manslaughter. Instead of a sentence of life in prison without parole, the man received a 5-year sentence. In this highly publicized trial, many long-time courtroom observers called Rolle's closing argument to the jury one of the best they have seen. Rolle also won full acquittals on three courts-martial he handled while on active duty in the US Army, and also on five recent civilian trials including a felony drug case, first-degree assault, and domestic violence. Rolle also won a double jeopardy case he argued in the Supreme Court of Maryland. The case, State v. Fennell is a reported opinion.

On November 4, 2014, Rolle was elected as Circuit Court Judge, for Frederick County, Maryland. It is the first time ever that a "sitting" judge appointed by Governor Martin O'Malley (Danny O'Connor in 2014) lost the general election. O'Connor served for less than a year. Rolle began his 15-year term after his investiture on December 15, 2014.

== Awards and recognition ==
The Daily Record newspaper awarded Rolle in 2013 its Influential Marylander Award for his work on the History Channel's Brad Meltzer's Decoded. In 2005, Rolle was recognized with the Daily Record's Leadership in Law Award. He has been awarded the Governor's Citation for his work in the area of forfeiture of drug dealer assets and as chief narcotics prosecutor. He was named Outstanding Young Marylander in 1999 by the Maryland Jaycees for his community service work and work as a prosecutor.

== Army Reserve ==
Rolle joined the United States Army Reserve in September 2001, receiving a direct commission in the Judge Advocate General's Corps. In 2006, Rolle was defense counsel in the court-martial of Sergeant Michael Smith, a dog handler at Abu Ghraib prison, and is credited for the light sentence Smith received based on his arguments to the military jury at sentencing. In January 2008, he was called to active duty and mobilized for a thirteen-month tour at Fort Meade, Maryland, and was responsible for most cases arising from the Walter Reed Army Medical Center in Washington, DC. Rolle spent time in Iraq on a special TDY mission in late 2008. Rolle was again called to active duty in late 2009 early 2010 to act as Operations Officer for the H1N1 Regional Joint Task Force Alpha. He was assigned to the 200th Military Police Command during this tour. He was promoted to lieutenant colonel in 2016. During his active duty tours, Rolle tried 3 full panel courts-martial, representing soldiers charged with numerous offenses. He obtained acquittals on all 3 courts-martial. From October 2018 to May 2019, LTC Rolle was mobilized and deployed to Afghanistan as the Chief Investigator for Human Rights Violations in support of the NATO mission. He served there with the USFOR-A.

LTC Rolle's military awards include a Joint Commendation Medal with Combat "C" device, the NATO non-article 5 medal, the Afghanistan Campaign Medal with bronze star device, the Meritorious Service Medal, Army Commendation Medal with four Oak Leaf Clusters, the Global War on Terror Service Medal, the Army Achievement Medal, the National Defense Service Medal, the Army Reserve Component Achievement Medal with Oak Leaf Cluster, the Armed Forces Reserve Medal with "M" device and hourglass device, and the Army Service Ribbon.

== Acting ==
Rolle began acting in local community theater productions put on by the Fredericktowne Players, Montgomery Playhouse, and No Dog Theater Productions. He went on to supporting roles in the independent films Substance and Money Matters as well as various commercials and training films.

In July 2010, he joined the cast of Brad Meltzer's Decoded, which premiered December 2, 2010, on the History Channel as an investigator and legal expert who looks into alleged conspiracies and unsolved mysteries around the world.

== Writing ==
Rolle is also a published author whose first novel Prime Suspect was released in the fall of 2025. The fictional work is a crime thriller taking place in Rolle's hometown of Frederick, Maryland.

== In the media ==
Rolle has appeared on national television and radio programs such as Larry King Live, The O'Reilly Factor, Fox News Live with Rita Cosby, CNN's Burden of Proof and others. He has been quoted in the Washington Post, the Los Angeles Times, and the New York Times as an expert on criminal defense and criminal law.

== Personal life ==
Rolle resides in Frederick County, Maryland. He has two grown children of his own. His late father-in-law was former state's attorney and judge J. Thomas Nissel.
