= 383rd Military Intelligence Battalion =

United States Army unit

383d Military Intelligence Battalion
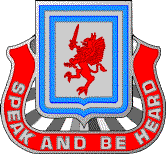
- Battalion Distinctive Unit Insignia
- Active: 1951–1953; 1996–? 2015–present
- Country: United States
- Branch: United States Army: Army Reserve
- Type: Military intelligence formation
- Size: Battalion
- Part of: 505th Military Intelligence Brigade
- Battalion HQ: Kansas City, Missouri
- Mottos: "Speak and Be Heard"
- Service Branch: Military Intelligence Corps

The 383d Military Intelligence Battalion is an intelligence formation of the United States Army's Military Intelligence Corps, currently part of the U.S. Army Reserve and falling under 505th Military Intelligence Brigade (Theater) since 2015.

== History ==
The 383d Military Intelligence Battalion can trace its lineage to a battalion of the same name constitution on 8 February 1951 in the Organized Reserve Corps. The battalion was activated on 1 March 1951 in Newark, New Jersey. On 9 July 1952, the Organized Reserve Corps was redesignated as the Army Reserve and the battalion consequently transferred. On 28 February 1953, the battalion was inactivated.

On 28 March 1996, the battalion's headquarters became the Headquarters and Service Company, and the battalion consequently reconstituted. The battalion joined the 464th Chemical Brigade, and would remain part of the brigade until 1 October 2007 when it was relieved.

On 16 September 2015, the 505th Military Intelligence Brigade (Theater) was re-activated as part of United States Army North. The battalion's headquarters were established in Kansas City, Missouri. The 383d was subsequently re-activated and came under control of the brigade later that year.

== Organization ==
The battalion is a subordinate unit of the US Army Reserve's 505th Military Intelligence Brigade (Theater). As of January 2026 the battalion consists of the following units:

- 383rd Military Intelligence Battalion (Theater Support), in Kansas City (MO)
  - Headquarters and Headquarters Company, in Kansas City (MO)
  - Alpha Company, 383rd Military Intelligence Battalion (Theater Support), at Fort Leavenworth (KS)
  - Bravo Company, 383rd Military Intelligence Battalion (Theater Support), at New Century AirCenter (KS)
  - Charlie Company, 383rd Military Intelligence Battalion (Theater Support), in Belton (MO)

== Description/Blazon ==
- "Argent, a griffin rampant Gules grasping in dexter claws a sword Proper; an orle gemel Azure (Oriental Blue). That for the regiments and separate battalions of the Army Reserve: From a wreath Argent and Gules, the Lexington Minute Man Proper. The statue of the Minute Man, Captain John Parker (H.H. Kitson, sculptor), stands on the common in Lexington, Massachusetts. SPEAK AND BE HEARD."

== Symbolism ==
Oriental Blue and silver gray are the colors traditionally used by Military Intelligence. The griffin, celebrated in heraldry for courage and resourcefulness, symbolizes the expertise and capability of the 383d Military Intelligence Battalion. It is grasping a sword denoting readiness and the will to engage an adversary. The double orle reflects the motto's reference to being heard, suggesting waves of transmitted sound in communication and conveyance of information. It suggests also the duplicity concomitant with carrying out the intelligence mission. White indicates integrity, scarlet denotes sacrifice and courage; together with blue they represent the United States. The crest is that of the U. S. Army Reserve.

== Background ==
The coat of arms was approved on 10 September 1997.

== Unique naming ==
The 383d MI BN does not have the "r" as anticipated in its naming convention (i.e. 383rd) as noted by the U.S. Army Institute of Heraldry.
