= 505th Military Intelligence Brigade (Theater) =

Intelligence Formation of the United States Army

505th Military Intelligence Brigade (Theater) 505th Military Intelligence Group
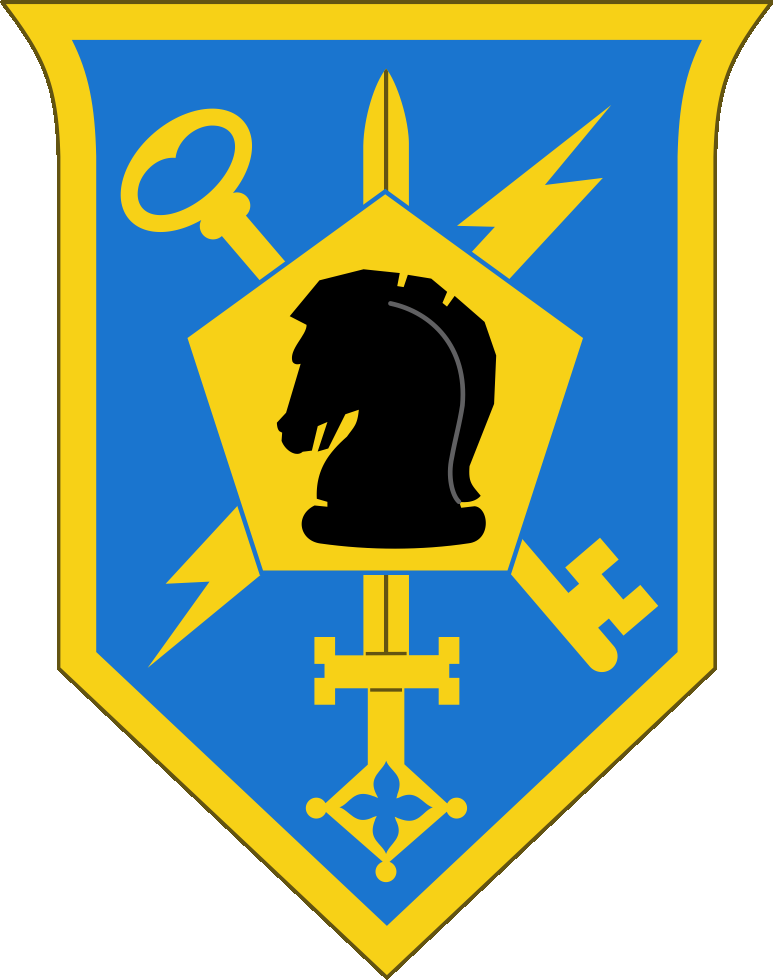
- Brigade Shoulder Sleeve Insignia
- Active: 1951–1959; 1963–1968; 1998–2007; 2015–present
- Country: United States
- Branch: United States Army
- Type: Military intelligence formation
- Size: Brigade of two battalions
- Part of: United States Army North
- Brigade HQ: Fort Sam Houston, Texas
- Nickname: "Victory Brigade"
- Motto: "Out Front for Victory"

Insignia
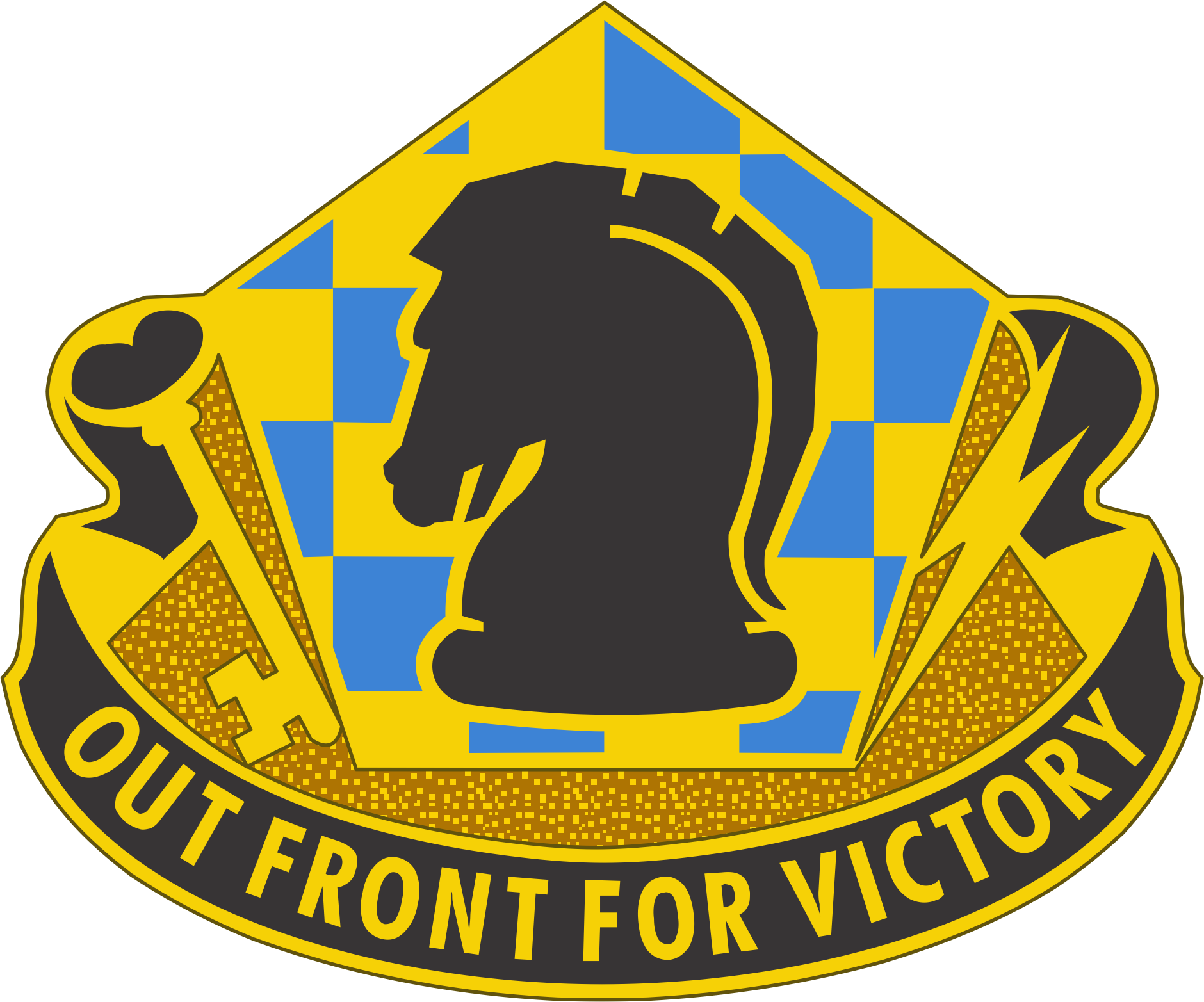
- Distinctive Unit Insignia

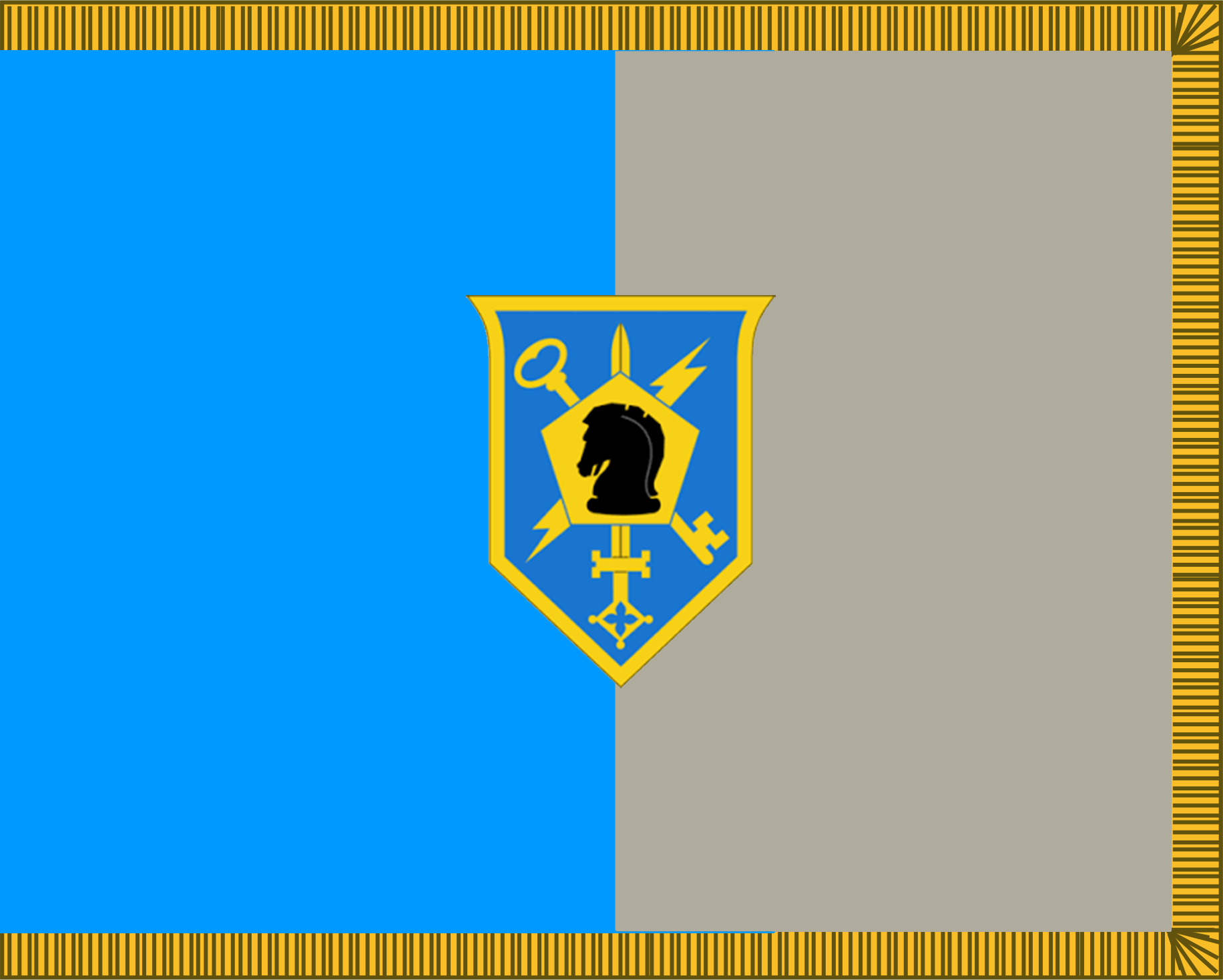
- 505th Military Intelligence Brigade Flag

The 505th Military Intelligence Brigade (Theater) is a military formation of the United States Army falling under the command of United States Army North.

== History ==
The 505th Military Intelligence Brigade traces its history back to 30 January 1951 when the 505th Communication Reconnaissance Group was constituted within the Organized Reserve Corps (predecessor to the Army Reserve). On 19 February 1951, the group was activated with its headquarters in Boston, Massachusetts. On 9 July 1952, the Organized Reserve Corps was re-designated as the Army Reserve and the group consequently joined. On 10 September 1956, the group was re-designated as the 505th Army Security Agency Group. However, on 1 July 1959, the group was inactivated.

On 15 February 1963, the group was re-activated with its headquarters in Boston, Massachusetts. However, on 31 January 1968, the group was inactivated once again.

On 1 February 1990 the group became the 505th Military Intelligence Group, and on 8 August 1995 the headquarters became the headquarters and headquarters detachment. Under the re-organization of the Army following the end of the Cold War, the group was re-activated as the 505th Military Intelligence Group (East) with its headquarters at Fort Gillem, Georgia on 18 February 1998. At this time, the group had two technical intelligence (TECHINT) companies at Fort Devens in Massachusetts, an imagery analysis battalion on Staten Island, New York, and an exploitation company in Orlando, Florida.

On 23 September 2015, the group was re-activated as 505th Military Intelligence Brigade (Theater) as part of United States Army North. The group's headquarters were established at Fort Sam Houston in Texas, part of Joint Base San Antonio. The brigade was the first of its kind, becoming the only Army Reserve-led theater military intelligence brigade. At the time of the brigade's reformation, it had a strength of 600 active duty, reserve, and Army National Guard soldiers, and only the seventh brigade of its type within the Army.

In late 2018, the brigade headquarters and headquarters company were deployed to the Mexico–United States border by order of President Donald Trump to counter the illegal migrant caravans moving from Mexico.

Nickname: "Victory Brigade"

== Organization ==
The brigade is a subordinate unit of the US Army Reserve's Military Intelligence Readiness Command. As of January 2026 the brigade consists of the following units:

- 505th Military Intelligence Brigade (Theater), at Camp Bullis (TX)
  - Headquarters and Headquarters Company, at Camp Bullis (TX)
  - 377th Military Intelligence Battalion (Theater Support), in Austin (TX) (aligned with US Army South's 470th Military Intelligence Brigade)
    - Headquarters and Headquarters Company, in Austin (TX)
    - Alpha Company, 377th Military Intelligence Battalion (Theater Support), at Camp Bullis (TX)
    - Bravo Company, 377th Military Intelligence Battalion (Theater Support), in Miami (FL)
    - Charlie Company, 377th Military Intelligence Battalion (Theater Support), at Naval Air Station Joint Reserve Base Fort Worth (TX)
  - 383rd Military Intelligence Battalion (Theater Support), in Kansas City (MO) (supports US Army North)
    - Headquarters and Headquarters Company, in Kansas City (MO)
    - Alpha Company, 383rd Military Intelligence Battalion (Theater Support), at Fort Leavenworth (KS)
    - Bravo Company, 383rd Military Intelligence Battalion (Theater Support), at New Century AirCenter (KS)
    - Charlie Company, 383rd Military Intelligence Battalion (Theater Support), in Belton (MO)
  - 549th Military Intelligence Battalion (Operations), at Camp Bullis (TX)
    - Headquarters and Headquarters Company, at Camp Bullis (TX)
    - Alpha Company, 549th Military Intelligence Battalion (Operations), at Camp Bullis (TX)
    - Bravo Company, 549th Military Intelligence Battalion (Operations), at Camp Bullis (TX)

== Insignia ==
=== Shoulder Sleeve Insignia ===
Description

On an Oriental Blue shield 2 9/16 inches (6.51 cm) in width at top and 2 3/16 inches (5.56 cm) in width at base and 3 1/2 inches (8.89 cm) in height overall, blazoned as follows: Celeste (Oriental Blue), a sword fesswise Or (Golden Yellow), point upward throughout, the hand guard, hilt and pommel as a stylized key, surmounted by a key, wards upward to sinister and lightning bolt in saltire all of the second, overall in fess point, a pentagon of the second, edged of the first, bearing a chess knight Sable; all within a Golden Yellow 1/8 inch (.32 cm) border.

Symbolism

Oriental blue is the primary color traditionally used by Military Intelligence units. The sword represents military readiness; with the key-shaped hilt, hand guard and pommel, allude to control. The key symbolizes security and support functions. The lightning bolt signifies speed to provide electronic communications. The shape of the shield pays homage to the Military Intelligence Readiness Command unit patch. The chess knight signifies covert capabilities.

Background

The shoulder sleeve insignia was approved effective 16 September 2015.

=== Distinctive unit insignia ===
Description/Blazon

A gold color metal and enamel device 1 1/8 inches (2.86 cm) in width consisting of a gold and blue chequey pentagon surmounted by a black chess knight flanked on either side by a gold key and lightning flash all enclosed in base by a black scroll doubled and inscribed "OUT FRONT FOR VICTORY" in gold.

Symbolism

Oriental blue is the primary color traditionally used by Military Intelligence units. The pentagon suggests "505" the unit's designation. The chess knight signifies covert capabilities, while the checky background denotes strategy. The lightning flash represents speed and cutting technology, while the key symbolizes security and support functions.

Background

The distinctive unit insignia was originally approved for the 505th Military Intelligence Group on 1 December 1997. It was amended to correct the description of the design on 18 February 1998. The insignia was redesignated effective 16 September 2015, for the 505th Military Intelligence Brigade.
