= Paul G. Kaminski =

American scientist and government official

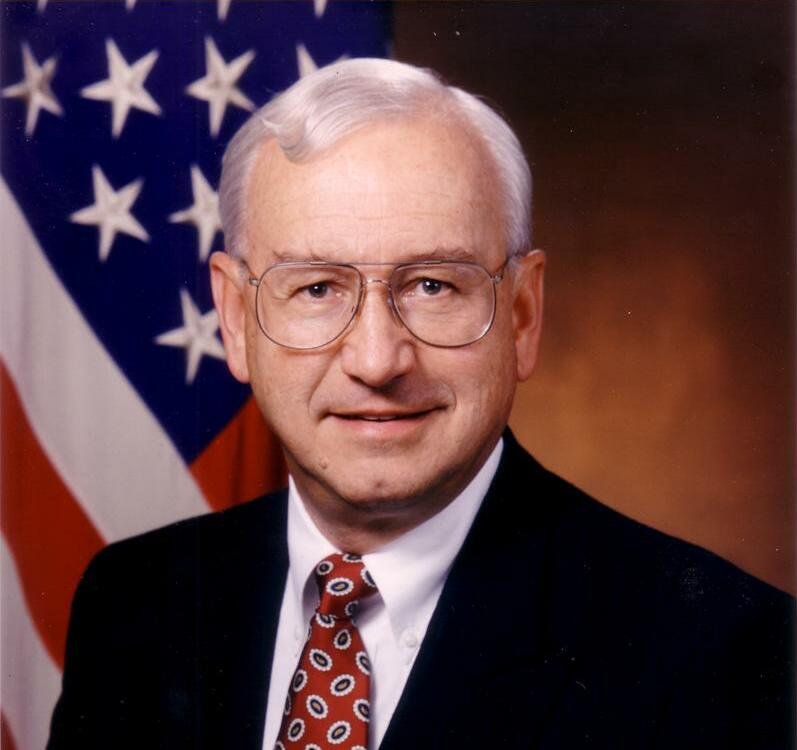

Under Secretary of Defense for Acquisition and Technology
- In office October 3, 1994 – May 16, 1997
- Preceded by: John M. Deutch
- Succeeded by: Jacques S. Gansler

Personal details
- Born: September 16, 1942 (age 83) Cleveland, Ohio, U.S.
- Education: United States Air Force Academy (BS); Massachusetts Institute of Technology (2 MS); Stanford University (PhD)

Military service
- Allegiance: United States
- Branch/service: United States Air Force
- Years of service: 1964–1984
- Rank: Colonel
- Awards: Defense Distinguished Service Medal; Legion of Merit (2)

Paul Garrett Kaminski (born September 16, 1942) is a technologist and former U.S. government official, best known for his leading role in the development of stealth aircraft.

== Early life ==
Kaminski was born in Cleveland, Ohio in 1942 and graduated from John Marshall High School in 1960. He received his B.S. degree in Engineering Science from the Air Force Academy in 1964. Kaminski earned M.S. degrees in Aeronautics and Astronautics and in Electrical Engineering from MIT in 1966 and a Ph.D. in Aeronautics and Astronautics from Stanford University in 1971. His doctoral thesis was entitled Square Root Filtering and Smoothing for Discrete Processes.

== Military and government career ==
Kaminski served 20 years on active duty in the United States Air Force, mostly within Air Force Systems Command, rising to the rank of colonel. Among other Air Force assignments, Kaminski was responsible for the testing and evaluation of inertial guidance components for the LGM-30 Minuteman missile and terminal guidance systems for the first U.S. precision-guided munitions.

In 1971, Kaminski was assigned to the National Reconnaissance Office, based out of Los Angeles AFB. There, he led work on a space system and related "unconventional imaging" technology, including the flying of prototypes on low and high-altitude aircraft. This assignment, possibly related to the Lacrosse program, continued until 1976.

From 1976 to 1977, Kaminski was a student at the Industrial College of the Armed Forces. During this time, he met then-Under Secretary of Defense for Research and Engineering William J. Perry, becoming Perry's Special Assistant in 1977. One of his assignments during this time was to assess early work on stealth technology. Kaminski recommended going ahead with the creation of a large program that included the experimental Have Blue airplane, which was later developed into the F-117A Nighthawk.

When Perry left the government in 1981, Kaminski became Director for Low Observables Technology, with responsibility for overseeing the development, production and fielding of major stealth aircraft systems such as the F-117A, which was already well underway at the time, the Northrop Grumman B-2 Spirit which was in its developmental stage, the AGM-129 ACM cruise missile and several other classified programs. Kaminski held this position from 1981 to 1984.

In 1984, Kaminski retired from the Air Force as a colonel after 20 years of service. After a decade in the private sector, he returned to government in 1994 as Under Secretary of Defense for Acquisition and Technology from 1994 to 1997, under by-then Secretary of Defense William J. Perry. In this role, he was responsible for activities with an aggregate annual budget exceeding $100 billion. He is credited with starting the "Revolution in Business Affairs", a Pentagon acquisition reform initiative that was continued by his successor, Jacques Gansler.

== Later career ==
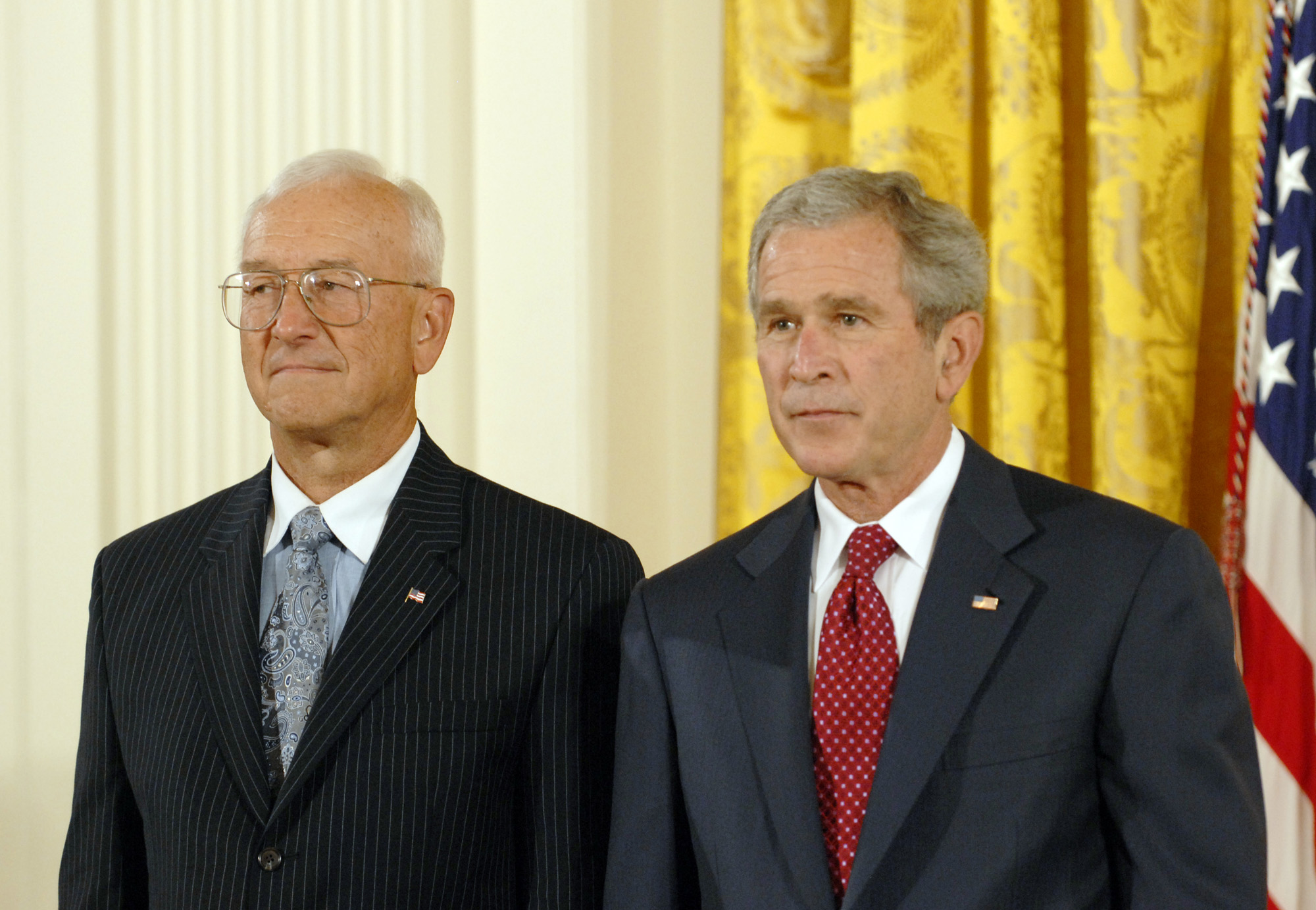
Paul G. Kaminski receiving the 2006 National Medal of Technology from President George W. Bush

In his first period away from government work (1984–1994), Kaminski joined Perry in Technology Strategies and Alliances, an investment banking and technology strategy business, of which Kaminski eventually became chairman and chief executive officer. Then and subsequently, he has served as a consultant and advisor to a wide variety of government agencies and as chairman, director or trustee of several defense and technology oriented companies.

In 1994, Kaminski was elected a member of the National Academy of Engineering for leadership and technical contributions to stealth technology and military systems. He is also a Fellow of the Institute for Electrical and Electronics Engineers, and an Honorary Fellow of the American Institute of Aeronautics & Astronautics. Kaminski has been a member of the President's Intelligence Advisory Board, Chairman of the Defense Science Board, and has served as a member of the DNI's Senior Advisory Group, FBI Director's Advisory Board, the Senate Select Committee on Intelligence Technical Advisory Board, the National Academies Air Force Studies Board, and the Atlantic Council.

He has been the chief executive officer and president of Technovation Inc. since 1997.

Kaminski has authored publications dealing with inertial and terminal guidance system performance, simulation techniques, Kalman filtering and numerical techniques applied to estimation problems.

== Service to Profession and Society ==
- Member of the President's Intelligence Advisory Board (2009–2014)
- Chairman of the Defense Science Board (1993–1994 and 2009–2015) and continuing member
- Member of the Director of National Intelligence’s Senior Advisory Group (2011–2015)
- Member of the FBI Director's Advisory Board (2003–2010)
- Member of the Senate Select Comm. on Intelligence Technical Advisory Group (1997–2014)
- Member of National Academies Air Force Studies Board (2011–2015)
- Member of the National Academy of Engineering (1994)
- Director of RAND Corporation Board (Chairman 2009–2013)
- Director, Board of Managers of the Johns Hopkins Applied Physics Lab (2009-present)
- Founding Director of United States Air Force Academy Foundation (2009-present)
- Director of LGS Innovations (part of former Bell Labs) (2014–2019)
- Advisory Board MIT Lincoln Laboratory (2009-present)
- Chairman of the Exostar Board (2001–2020)
- Chairman of HRL (former Hughes Research Labs) Board (2004-present)
- Chairman of the Seagate Government Solutions Board (2015-present)
- Chairman of the CyberPatriot Board of Advisers (Air Force Association) (2010-present)
- Director of General Dynamics (1998–2014)
- Director of Bay Microsystems (2004–2018)
- Director of CoVant Technologies (2007-present)
- Founding Director of In-Q-Tel (2005–2012)
- Director of Atlantic Council (2002–2006)
- Director of Draper Labs (1997–1998)
- Director of Anteon (1998–2006)
- Director of Dyncorp (1988–1994)
- Director of LMI (Logistics Management Institute) (1998–2005)
- Director of Veridan (1998–2003)
- Director of LinQuest (2018-present)
- Director of Aevex Aerospace (2020-present)
- Director of Axient (2020-present)
- Advisor to Immersive Wisdom (2020-present)
- Leads the Board of Advisors for AFA’s CyberPatriot program, which inspires K-12 students toward careers in STEM disciplines critical to our nation’s future

== Honors and awards ==
- National Medal of Technology and Innovation (2006) ("For his contributions to national security through the development of advanced, unconventional imaging from space, and for developing and fielding advanced systems with greatly enhanced survivability. He has made a profound difference in the national security posture and the global leadership of the United States")
- Air & Space Forces Association Lifetime Achievement Award ("In recognition of a lifetime of work advancing aerospace power, AFA awarded Dr. Paul Kaminski with a Lifetime Achievement Award at the 2023 Air, Space & Cyber Conference. The award was jointly presented by Secretary of the Air Force Frank Kendall, Lt. Gen. David Deptula, Dean of AFA's Mitchell Institute for Aerospace Studies; and Rachel Zimmerman, Director of CyberPatriot.”)
- National Aviation Hall of Fame (class of 2020) ("Led many technical aerospace programs, including guided munitions; lead developer of Stealth Technology; and directed F-117 and B-2 Programs”)

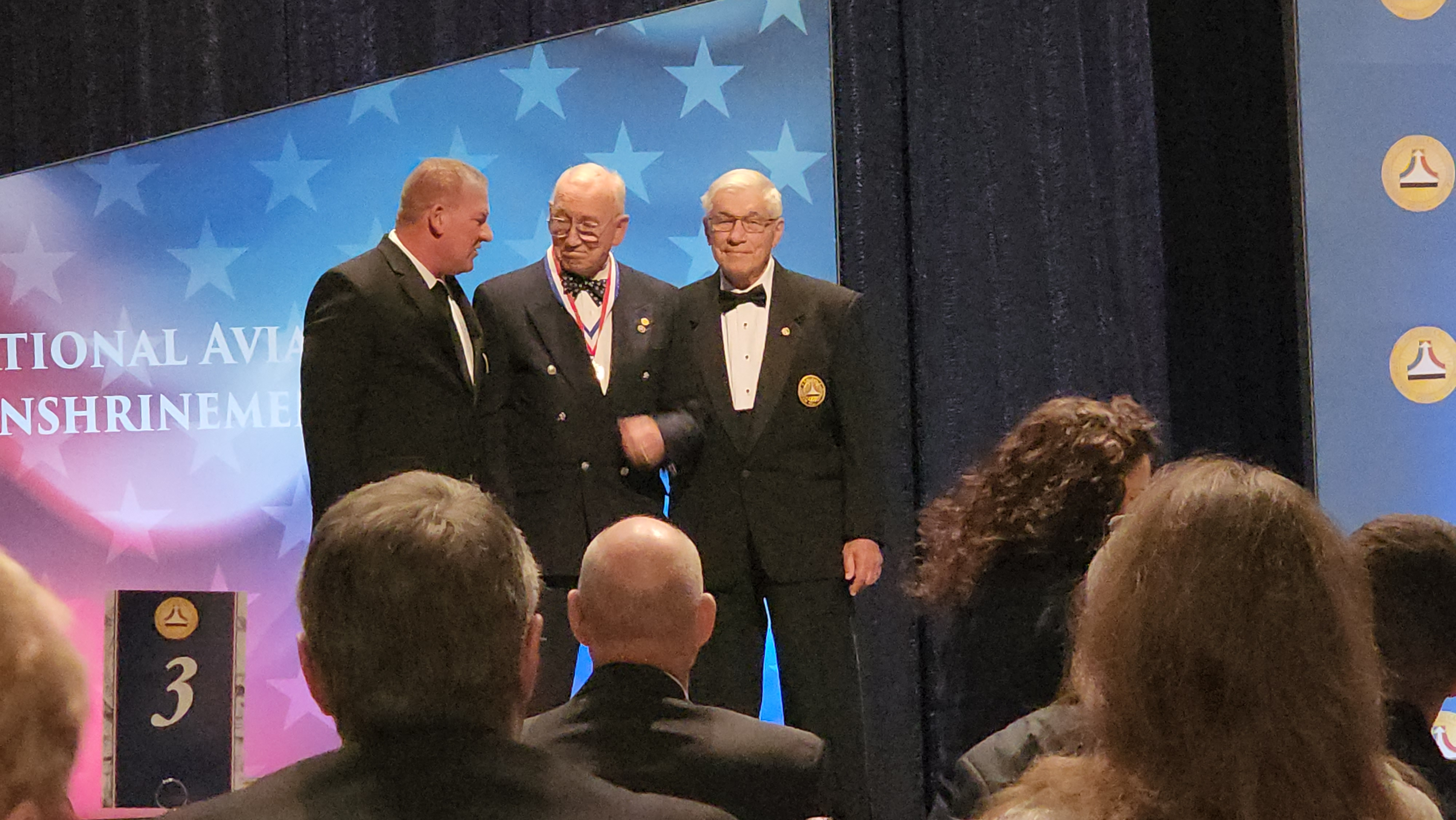
Paul Kaminski receives enshrinement into the National Aviation Hall of Fame

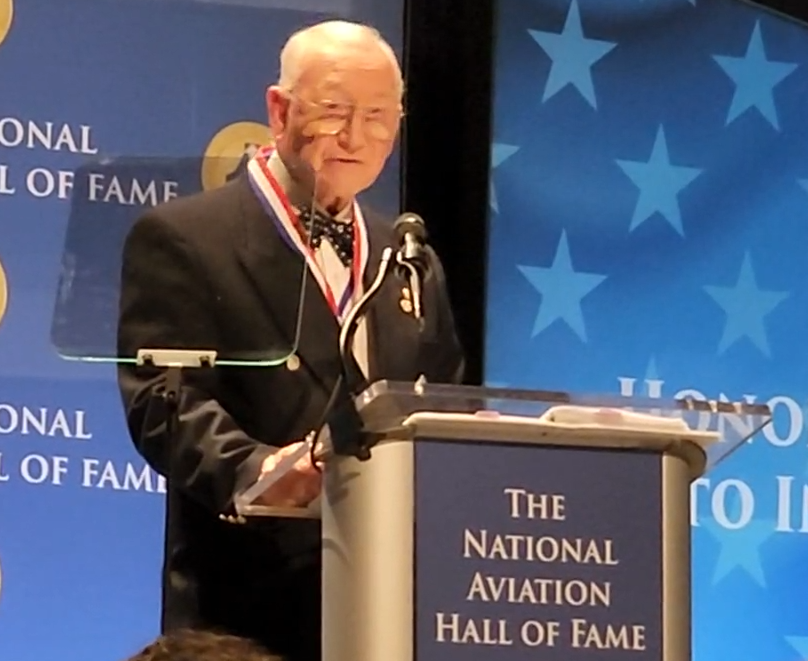
Paul Kaminski delivering remarks at the 2022 National Aviation Hall_ of Fame

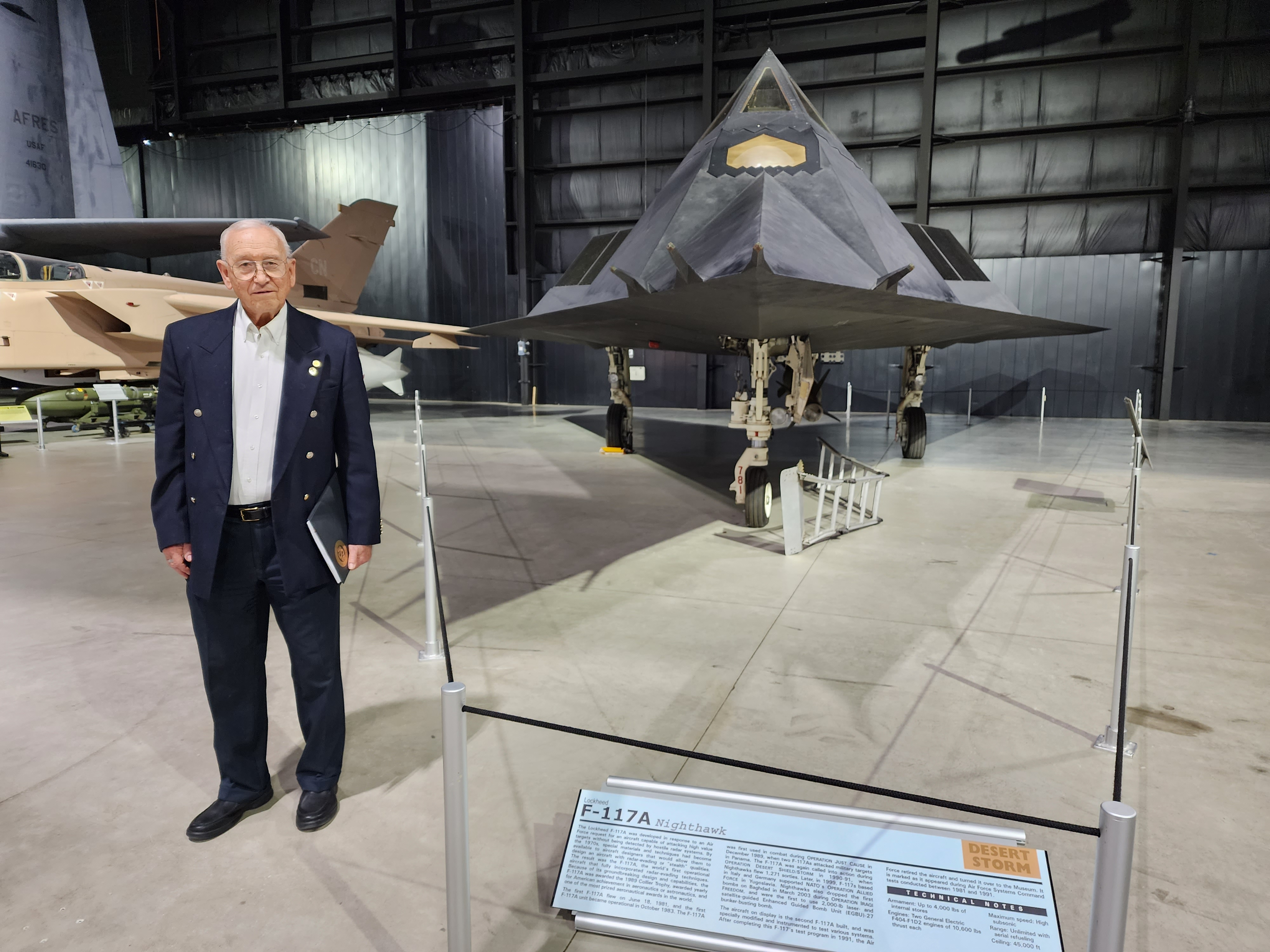
Paul Kaminski in front of the F-117A Stealth Fighter

- Honorary Fellow of AIAA (2014) ("For leadership and vision in developing and applying advanced technology to enhance our National Security and National Intelligence capabilities”)
- Honorary Fellow of Royal Aeronautical Society (RAeS) (2021) ("for leading the development of advanced low-observable systems and system-of-systems, including the F-117, the first operational stealth attack aircraft and the tools, training and weapons to effectively employ the systems")
- Ronald Reagan Award, US Department of Defense, Missile Defense Agency (2011)
- William J Perry Award ("in recognition of superb contributions to precision strike systems") (2015)
- IEEE Simon Ramo Medal, (2015) ("For leading the development of advanced low-observable systems and system-of-systems, including the F-117, the first operational stealth attack aircraft and the tools, training and weapons to effectively employ the systems")
- Member of the National Academy of Engineering (1994) ("For leadership and technical contributions to stealth technology and military systems")
- AIAA Reed Aeronautics award (2013) ("For leadership and vision in developing and applying advanced technology to enhance our National Security and National Intelligence capabilities")
- Fellow of IEEE (1998) (For pioneering contributions to Stealth/Counter-stealth technology and its application which fundamentally changed the nature of warfare and revolutionized design priorities of both offensive and defensive weapons systems and sensors.)
- SPIE, Lifetime Achievement Award (2012)
- National Reconnaissance Office, Pioneer of National Reconnaissance Award (2007)
- Pioneers of Stealth Award (1996).
- Department of Defense Medal for Distinguished Public Service (5 Awards) (1995, 1996, 1997, 2014, 2015)
- Department of Defense, Defense Distinguished Service Medal (1984)
- Fellow of AIAA (1999)
- USAF Academy, Distinguished Graduate class of 1964; Distinguished Graduate Award in 2002, after completing his Air Force and DOD careers
- Industrial College of the Armed Forces, Distinguished Graduate 1977, Eisenhower Award 2008
- Director of Central Intelligence Director's Award (2007)
- International Strategic Studies Association, Medal for Outstanding Contributions to Strategic Progress through Science and Technology (1998)
- Defense Intelligence Agency Director's Award (1997)
- Stanford University, Distinguished Graduate PhD class of 1971
- USAF Systems Command, Scientific Achievement Award (1968)
- Potomac Institute Navigator's Award, Leadership in Acquisition & Technology – Executive Branch (2000)
- Legion of Merit with Oak Leaf Cluster
- The Netherlands, Medal of Merit in Gold (1997)
- France, French Republic Legion d'Honneur (1999)
- Association of Old Crows, AOC Gold Medal (1992)
