= Jacques Gansler =

American engineer and public policy expert

Jacques S. Gansler
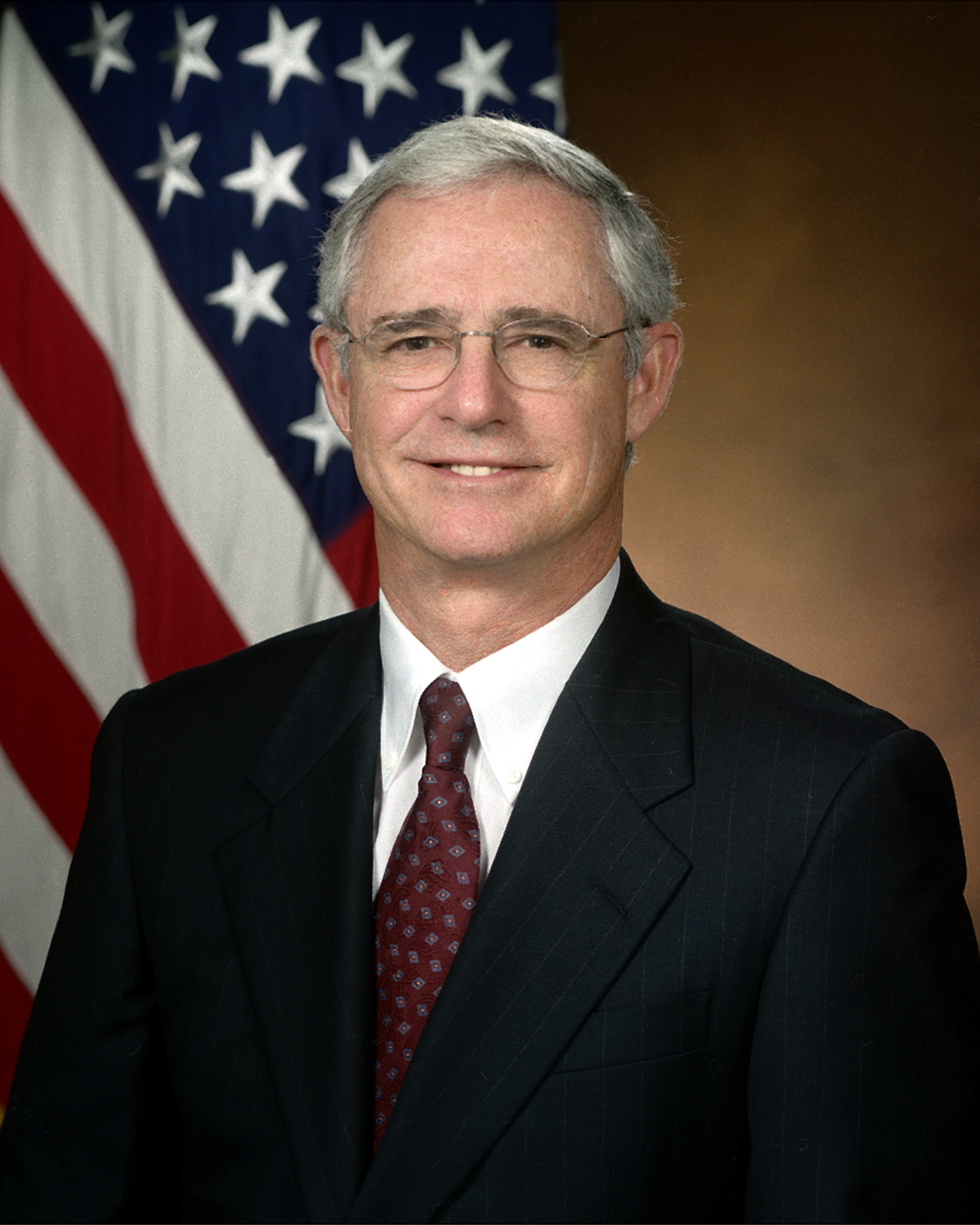
- Jack Gansler in November 1997

Under Secretary of Defense for Acquisition, Technology and Logistics
- In office November 10, 1997 – January 5, 2001
- Preceded by: Paul G. Kaminski
- Succeeded by: Edward C. Aldridge Jr.

Personal details
- Born: November 21, 1934 Newark, New Jersey
- Died: December 4, 2018 (aged 84) McLean, Virginia
- Children: Doug Gansler
- Education: Yale University (BE); Northeastern University (MS); The New School for Social Research (MA); American University (PhD)

Jacques Singleton "Jack" Gansler (November 21, 1934 – December 4, 2018) was an aerospace electronics engineer, defense contracting executive and public policy expert. He served as Under Secretary of Defense for Acquisition, Technology and Logistics from November 1997 to January 2001.

== Early life and education ==
Gansler was born in Newark, New Jersey in 1934, the son of Doris (Eisner) and Fred H. Gansler. He earned a bachelor's degree in electrical engineering from Yale University in 1956 and an M.S. degree in electrical engineering from Northeastern University in 1959. Gansler later received an M.A. degree in political economy from The New School for Social Research in 1972 and a Ph.D. degree in economics from American University in 1978. His doctoral thesis was entitled The diminishing economic and strategic viability of the U.S. defense industrial base.

== Career ==
Gansler's first job was as an aerospace electronics engineer for the Raytheon Corporation until 1962. He then served in management positions for the Singer Corporation until 1970 and as vice president for business development at the International Telephone and Telegraph Corporation from 1970 to 1972.

From 1972 to 1975, Gansler served as Assistant Director of Defense Research and Engineering for Electronics at the Pentagon. From 1975 to 1977, he served as Deputy Assistant Secretary of Defense for Materiel Acquisition.

In August 1977, Gansler joined The Analytical Sciences Corporation, eventually becoming an executive vice president.

In September 1997, President Bill Clinton nominated Gansler to be Under Secretary of Defense for Acquisition, Technology and Logistics.

In 2001, Gansler became a professor of public policy at the University of Maryland, College Park. During his tenure at the university, he also served as interim dean of the School of Public Policy from 2003 to 2004 and as the university's vice president for research from 2004 to 2006. Gansler also founded and served as director of the Center for Public Policy and Private Enterprise at the School of Public Policy.

In September 2007, Gansler was appointed chairman of a special commission to investigate the United States Army's acquisition and contracting processes.

Gansler retired from the University of Maryland in 2016.

== Awards ==
Gansler was elected to the National Academy of Engineering in 2002. He was also a fellow of the National Academy of Public Administration.

== Personal ==
Gansler married Leah M. Calabro. They had two daughters, a son and five grandchildren. Their son Douglas is a former Attorney General of Maryland.

Diagnosed with melanoma, Gansler died at his home in McLean, Virginia in 2018.

== Publications ==
- Democracy's Arsenal: Creating a Twenty-First-Century Defense Industry, The MIT Press, June 2011, 448 pp., ISBN 978-0-262-07299-1.
- Defense Conversion, The MIT Press, May 1995, 293 pp., ISBN 978-0-262-07166-6.
- Affording Defense, The MIT Press, March 1989, 417 pp., ISBN 978-0-262-07117-8
- The Defense Industry, The MIT Press, September 1980, 346 pp., ISBN 978-0-262-07078-2.
