= Montgomery Playhouse =

The Montgomery Playhouse
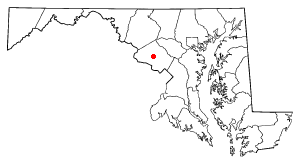
- The Montgomery Playhouse, Gaithersburg, MD
- Former names: The Montgomery Players, The Kensington/Garrett Players
- Location: Gaithersburg, Maryland
- Seating type: Open Seating, raked seating
- Capacity: 300 people, Handicapped Accessible
- Type: Community Theater, Non-Professional
- Events: Dramatic, Comedy, Musical

Construction
- Opened: June, 1989
- Expanded: April, 2001

Website
- The Montgomery Playhouse

The Montgomery Playhouse is Maryland's second oldest continually-running community theatrical performance group. Formed in 1989 from a merger between through a joint effort of the Board of Directors of both The Kensington/Garret Players and The Montgomery Players, The Montgomery Playhouse, in some form, has been providing theater performances for 85 years.

== History ==
=== Montgomery Players ===
The third oldest community theater in Maryland (The Vagabond Players enters their 99th continual season as of September 2014 and the Potomac Playmakers in Hagerstown began in 1926), The Montgomery Players have been in existence since 1929, where they performed regularly in the Chevy Chase, Maryland area at Leland Junior High and the Landon School.

In 1962 the group relocated to Inverness Playhouse in North Bethesda, Maryland, where they spent the next ten years performing there. In 1972 The Montgomery Players once again moved and took up residence at 1201 Quince Orchard Boulevard in Gaithersburg, Maryland in a newly renovated 305-seat theater that they would call their own. This group, up through the merger in 1989, had produced 60 continuous seasons of community theater.

=== The Kensington/Garrett Players ===
The Garrett Park Players organization originated in 1949. In their early years they performed on rented stages in local schools and recreation centers throughout Montgomery County, Maryland. In 1960 they merged with the Kensington Players (who had been performing for several years at Kensington Junior High School). This combined group was known as the Kensington/Garret Players (K-G Players). In 1966 the group moved to a permanent residence at the Kensington Armory. When the State of Maryland closed down the Armory in 1974, the group moved to Quince Orchard Boulevard.

=== The Merger ===
In the ensuing years, the Montgomery Players and the K-G Players were both theaters whose attendance was in a slight decline. While sharing actors and technical personnel, they were not sharing in the same profits they once did. In May 1989, the Montgomery Players and the K-G Players decided to join forces in a business accord, since the majority of their theater talent were shared by the two companies, they decided to join forces in hopes of turning a profit, and the Montgomery Playhouse was born in the space in which the Montgomery Players were occupying.

In December 1999, the Montgomery Playhouse was forced to move from its home in Gaithersburg, Maryland to a temporary facility at the Shady Grove Middle School in Gaithersburg, Maryland. The final production at their facility, ironically, was Our Town.

Eighteen months later, The Montgomery Playhouse made an accord with the Asbury Methodist Village to perform their main stage productions at their new facility, a 300-seat theater. Soon after that, the City of Gaithersburg, recognizing the accomplishments by offering an additional venue to perform smaller, more intimate performance pieces at the newly renovated Gaithersburg Arts Barn, a 99-seat theater. To this date, the Montgomery Playhouse performs at both venues.

=== The Black Box New Play Festival ===
In November 1993, local actor and playwright Eric C. Peterson pitched an idea to the Montgomery Playhouse that it needed to foster and develop young, talented writers. As a member of The Writers Center in Bethesda, MD, the idea was to foster a relationship between the two organizations to help local writers get their works seen. Unfortunately, the connection between The Writers Center and The Montgomery Playhouse never did achieve its full potential. However, from this meeting, the Black Box New Play Festival was born.

This short play festival was designed to encourage writers to submit new work for stage presentation. The winners of this festival would represent The Montgomery Playhouse in regional and national competitions. The works of local and nationally notable writers, such as John Morogiello and Mark Scharf have been showcased in these festivals. The festival remains a summer staple to Montgomery Playhouse's bill of fare to this day, performing in the Arts Barn in the Kentlands, Gaithersburg, Maryland.
