= Doug Gansler =

American politician in Maryland

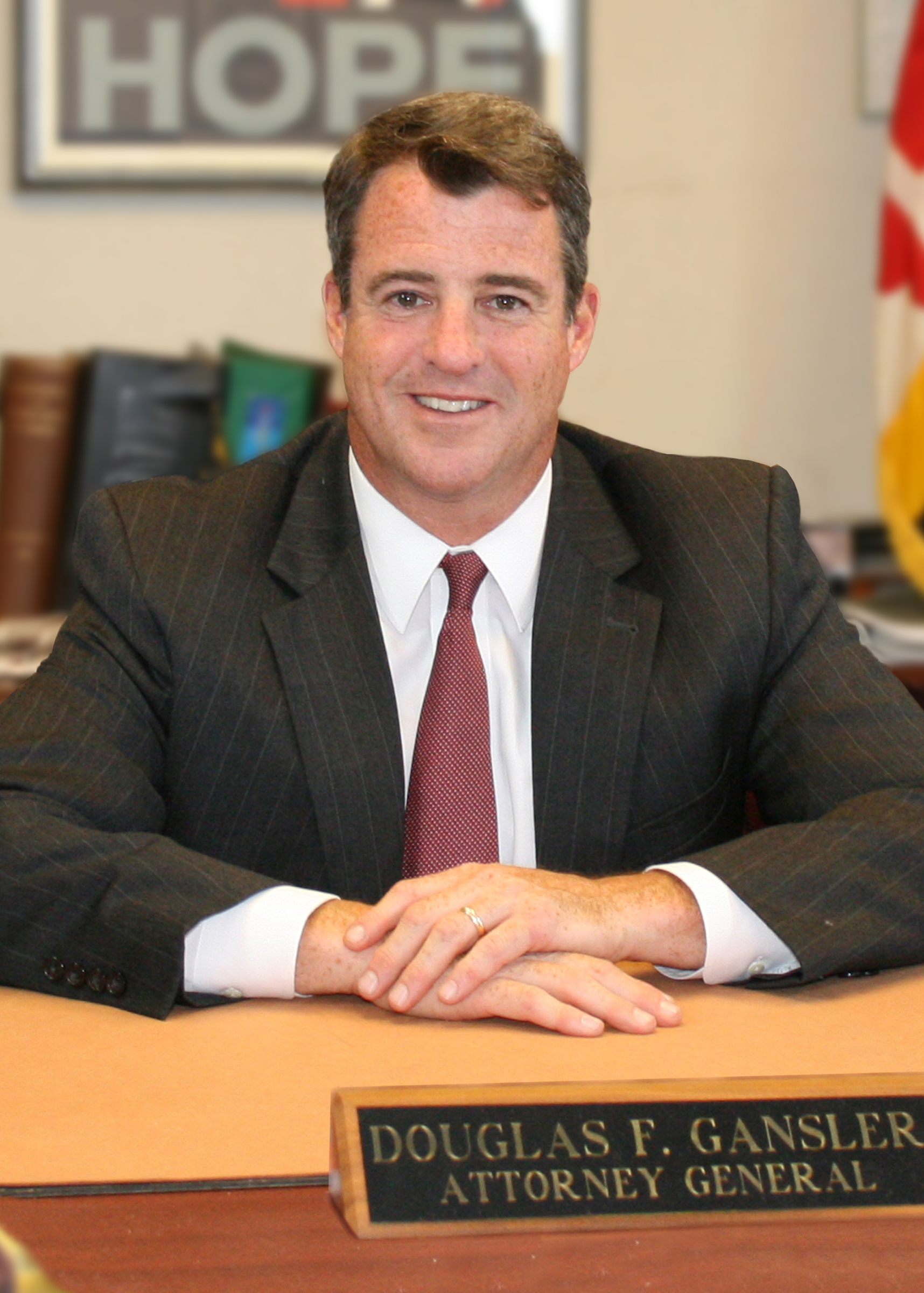
- Gansler in 2012

45th Attorney General of Maryland
- In office January 17, 2007 – January 21, 2015
- Governor: Martin O'Malley
- Preceded by: J. Joseph Curran Jr.
- Succeeded by: Brian Frosh

Personal details
- Born: Douglas Friend Gansler; October 30, 1962 (age 64) Summit, New Jersey, US
- Party: Democratic
- Spouse: Laura Leedy
- Children: 2
- Relatives: Jacques Gansler (father)
- Education: Yale University (BA); University of Virginia (JD)
- Website: Campaign website

Douglas Friend Gansler (born October 30, 1962) is an American attorney and politician who served as the 45th attorney general of Maryland from 2007 to 2015. Gansler previously served as the state's attorney for Montgomery County, Maryland from 1999 to 2007.

He won the state Democratic primary election for attorney general and defeated Republican Scott Rolle in the 2006 general election, taking 61% of the vote. He was re-elected unopposed in the 2010 election.

Gansler unsuccessfully ran for Governor of Maryland in the 2014 election, losing the Democratic primary to Anthony Brown. Gansler was also a gubernatorial candidate in the 2022 election, losing the Democratic primary to Wes Moore.

== Early life, education, and legal career ==
Born in Summit, New Jersey, Gansler grew up in Chevy Chase in Montgomery County, Maryland. There he attended Chevy Chase Elementary School, and Sidwell Friends School, a private Quaker school in the Washington, D.C., area, for grades 6–12.

Gansler became involved with politics at 13, knocking on doors for Frank Mankiewicz, who was then running for the U.S. House of Representatives in Maryland's 8th congressional district. From Sidwell, Gansler went to Yale University. He was an All-Ivy, All–New England College lacrosse player, and nurtured an interest in public service, graduating cum laude. Gansler earned a J.D. degree from the University of Virginia School of Law. He was a law clerk to Hon. John F. McAuliffe, Judge on the Maryland Court of Appeals.

After working for a brief period as a real estate lawyer at a title company and at the law firms of Coburn & Schertler and Howrey & Simon, Gansler was hired as an Assistant U.S. Attorney, serving from 1992 to 1998. There he prosecuted, among others, a Georgian diplomat who killed a young woman while driving drunk near Dupont Circle.

Gansler heads a practice group at Cadwalader, Wickersham & Taft

== Political career ==
=== State's Attorney for Montgomery County ===
In 1998, Gansler was elected State's Attorney for Montgomery County, Maryland, serving from January 1999 to January 2007. While serving, he prosecuted several high-profile cases, including the Beltway snipers, John Muhammad and Lee Boyd Malvo. Gansler also launched programs to fight gangs, punish criminals, and protect the public, including domestic violence dockets and drug courts, gang prosecution unit, Elder Abuse Task Force to target criminals preying on seniors, and an Internet crime unit.

On one occasion, the Maryland Court of Appeals sanctioned him for public statements he made about a possible confession and possible plea in a high-profile case involving the beating and murder of a Maryland jogger. He was the first elected State's Attorney to be sanctioned by the court.

=== Attorney General of Maryland ===
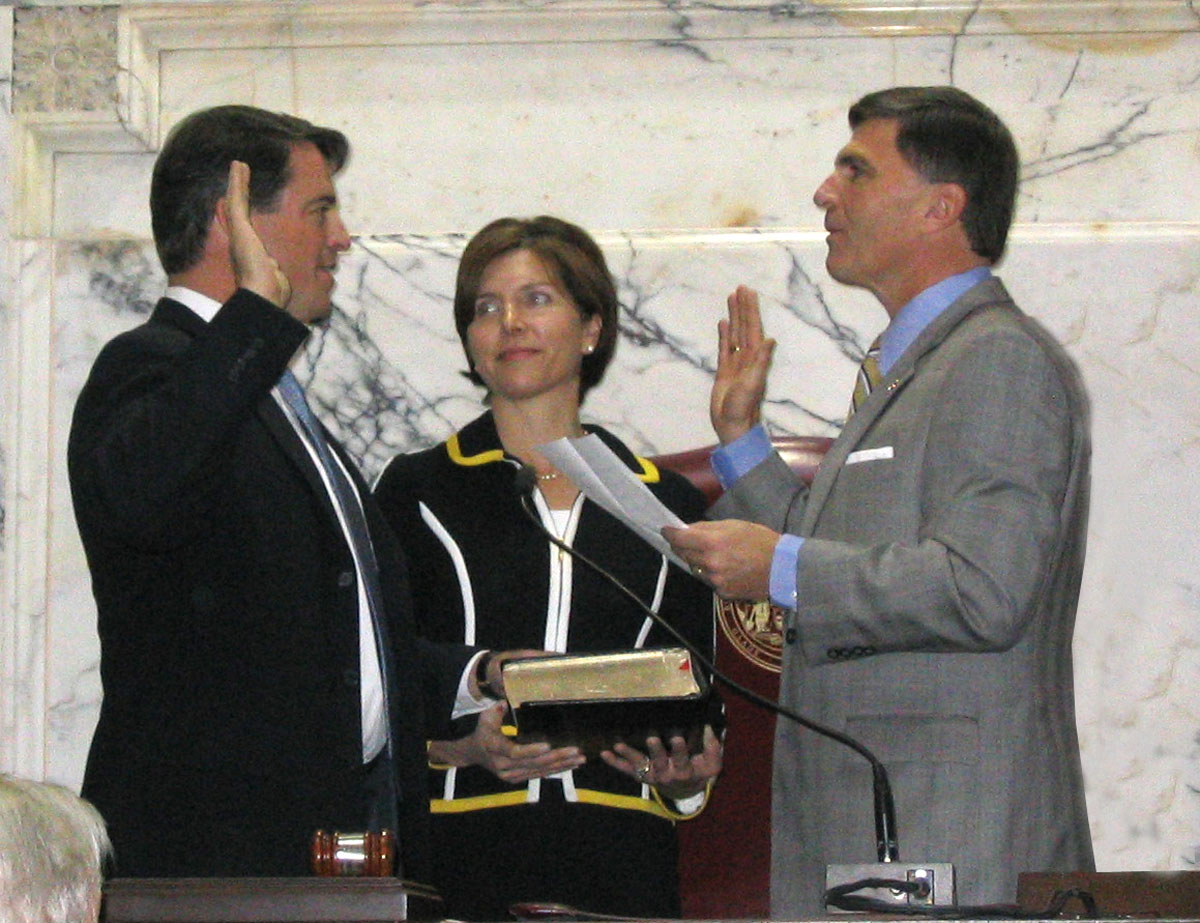
Douglas F. Gansler being sworn in as Maryland Attorney General, January 2, 2007.

Gansler was elected as Maryland Attorney General in 2006, taking the oath of office as Attorney General of Maryland on January 2, 2007. While in office, he focused on environmental protection, consumer protection, public safety, and civil rights.

Gansler was elected to a second term on November 2, 2010.

==== Environmental protection ====
Gansler protected the Chesapeake Bay, its tributaries, and Maryland's other natural resources. He secured air quality settlements, water pollution, oil pollution and asbestos penalties.

Gansler also led the successful charge to have phosphates banned from dishwasher detergent and arsenic banned from chicken feed, and helped secure standing for environmental groups to sue polluters in State court.

He also laid the groundwork for the construction of a power plant to convert 500 million pounds of chicken manure into energy, potentially keeping the single largest source of nitrogen and phosphorus out of the Chesapeake Bay, while providing Maryland farmers with an additional source of revenue.

==== Consumer protection ====
Gansler fought various forms of fraud that threatened home ownership, contributed to the cost of healthcare, and undermined citizens' financial security and well-being. This work included an agreement with all the major car rental companies to end usurious refueling rates, and a settlement with all four major Wireless carriers requiring disclosure of the terms of cell phone insurance.

===== Home ownership =====
In a fight against mortgage fraud, Gansler recovered nearly $1 billion in relief and assistance for Maryland homeowners. He was aggressive in going after predatory lenders, foreclosure scammers, unscrupulous contractors, and others who made home ownership difficult. His efforts recovered hundreds of millions of dollars for consumer victims.

===== Affordable healthcare =====
Gansler worked to keep consumers safe from healthcare scams. This work included the largest recovery in a healthcare fraud investigation in U.S. history against a major pharmaceutical company that illegally marketed drugs at the expense of consumer safety. It also included multimillion-dollar victories against healthcare providers who abused Medicaid at taxpayers’ expense, and others that preyed on the infirm. Gansler also advocated for better healthcare options for Marylanders, both through his Health Education and Advocacy Unit, and through his leadership in supporting broader healthcare solutions like the Affordable Care Act.

To promote the health and safety of Maryland teens, Gansler led the effort to limit youth access to alcohol and tobacco by combating the marketing practices of alcohol and tobacco companies that target younger consumers. This work led to an agreement with two of the largest alcohol manufacturers to stop the production and distribution of alcoholic "energy" drinks, as well as an agreement with one of the largest gas station franchises in the world to curb tobacco sales to minors at its 13,000 outlets across the United States.

===== Internet privacy =====
Recognizing that rapid developments in Internet technology and enterprise have created new and significant privacy risks for both consumers and corporations, Gansler led state and national efforts to protect online privacy. For example, he led a charge by 36 state attorneys general to demand accountability from the nation's largest provider of Internet services when it unilaterally changed its privacy policy. He also brought an action against a major retailer for an online breach that led to the theft of consumer credit card data from 100 million transactions.

==== Public safety ====
Gansler established the first-ever Attorney General Gang Prosecution Unit in Maryland. Gansler co-chaired the statewide Human Trafficking Task Force and spearheaded tougher domestic violence laws through his role as Co-Chair of Maryland's Family Violence Council.

Gansler also established a statewide Internet safety initiative focused on school-aged children, shut down an online anonymous gossip site being used to torment young students, helped eliminate the online illegal adult services section of Craigslist, and worked on a nationally coordinated effort targeting sexual predators who use social networking websites to lure victims. Tens of thousands of sexual predators were removed from social networking sites as a result of this effort. For this work, he received the Champion of Online Safety Award.

==== Civil rights ====
Gansler demonstrated a long-standing commitment to civil rights in his creation of the first-ever Director of Civil Rights position in the Office of the Attorney General. He set up a Voting Irregularities Task Force to address voter suppression issues in Maryland, and a Campaign Finance Advisory Committee to explore ways to ensure fair participation in the electoral process. He also published a report providing guidance on taser training protocols that is being used nationally by law enforcement, and a report that assists Maryland's institutions of higher education in legally developing and maintaining diversity. He worked for judicial election reform that would ensure diversity of the bench. For this work, as well as his successful efforts to increase diversity both in the Montgomery County State's Attorney's Office and the Office of the Attorney General, Gansler was awarded the Dr. Martin Luther King Jr. Dream Keeper's Award.

===== Same-sex marriage =====
Gansler was the first statewide elected official in Maryland to support marriage equality. In 2010, Gansler issued a legal opinion that clarified Maryland's ability to provide full faith and credit to valid out-of-state same-sex marriages. That opinion provided the underpinning for a subsequent Maryland Court of Appeals decision recognizing same-sex marriages from other states. For his early and strong support of marriage equality, Gansler received the Human Rights Campaign’s Ally for Equality Award.

===== Gun control =====
Gansler was a proponent of the Maryland State Police requirement for concealed carry permits, which states that a citizen must have a good and substantial reason in order to acquire the permit.

=== Maryland Co-Chair, Obama presidential campaign ===
During the 2008 presidential election, Gansler was the first statewide official in Maryland to support Barack Obama, and went on to be the Maryland Co-Chair, with Representative Elijah Cummings, of Obama’s Presidential Campaign.

=== President of the National Association of Attorneys General ===
Gansler was elected to serve as President of the National Association of Attorneys General (NAAG) in 2012. He served as Chair of the Democratic Attorneys General Association (DAGA) until becoming President-Elect at the NAAG. He also chaired NAAG committees on Youth Access to Alcohol, the Environment and Energy.

As President of NAAG, Gansler focused the organization’s attention on privacy in the Digital Age. He formed a Committee on Internet Privacy at NAAG to keep close watch on developments in the Internet space that affect consumers’ control over their information, and headed several efforts to hold accountable those who fail to properly respect consumer privacy online. He called attention to companies that collect information from children in ways that appear out of compliance with the Children's Online Privacy Protection Act.

=== 2014 Maryland gubernatorial election campaign ===
Gansler formally announced his candidacy in the Maryland's 2014 Gubernatorial race to succeed Martin O'Malley, who was term limited, on September 24, 2013. Gansler had a warchest of $5.2m and said that he was "flattered by the depth and breadth of support I have received from all corners of Maryland". Gansler was criticized by a Maryland veterans organization for suggesting that his leading opponent in the Democratic primary, Maryland Lt Gov. Anthony Brown, a former US Army Reserve Colonel, was "somebody who has never managed anybody, never run anything", as a result of his service. Gansler later explained that his comments were specifically in reference to managing the state's health exchange. Brown won the Democratic primary, but was defeated by Republican Party candidate Larry Hogan in an upset in the general election.

=== 2022 Maryland gubernatorial candidacy ===
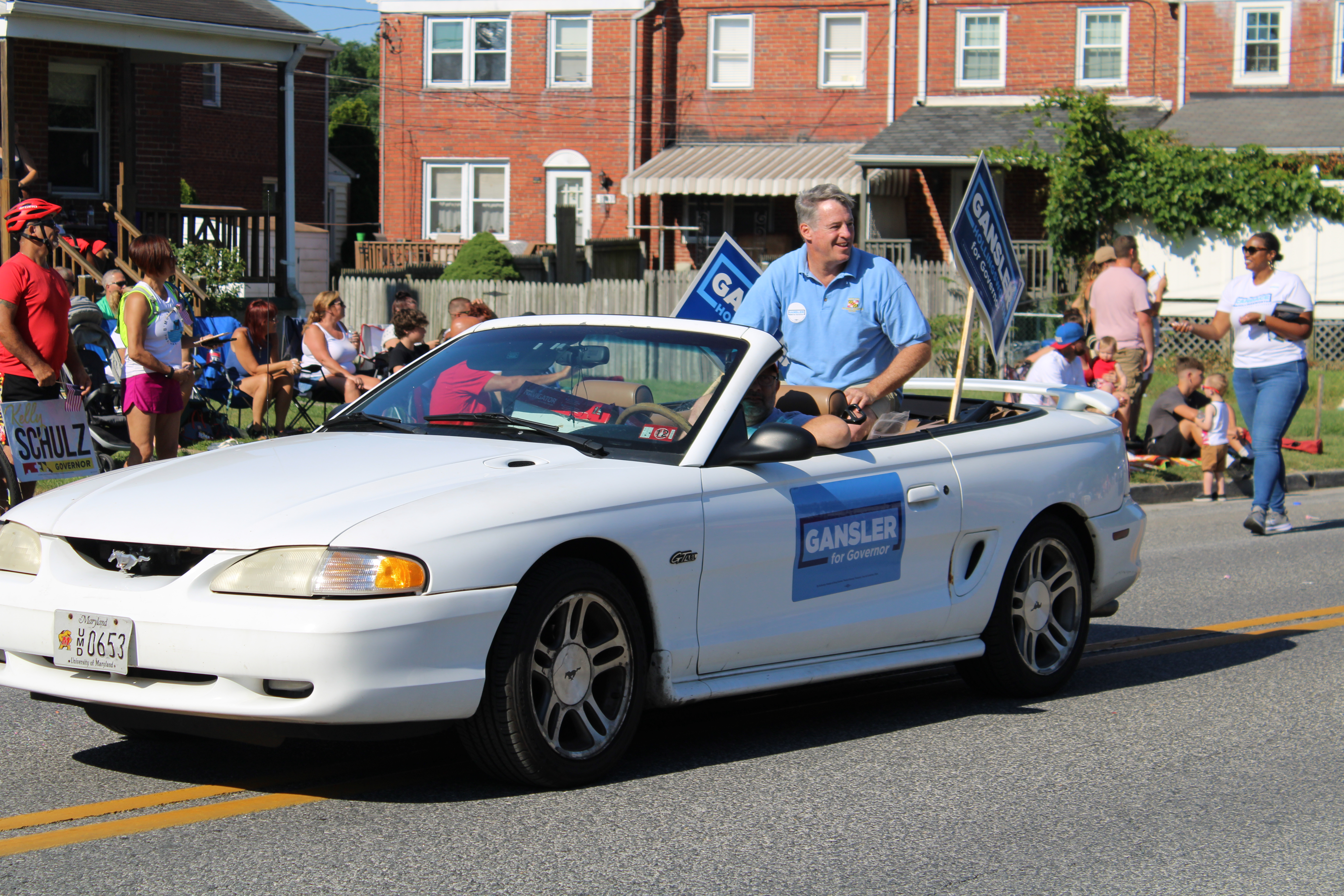
Gansler campaigning in Dundalk, Maryland, 2022

On May 25, 2021, Gansler announced that he would run for Governor of Maryland in the 2022 election. His running mate was former Hyattsville mayor Candace Hollingsworth. A central part of his platform was fighting crime in Baltimore.

On July 19, 2022, Gansler lost the primary, placing fourth behind Peter Franchot, Tom Perez, and Wes Moore. He conceded defeat on July 21, 2022, and endorsed Democratic nominee Wes Moore the next day.

=== Controversies ===
- In November 2002, Gansler irritated colleagues when he filed charges in Maryland against the Beltway snipers, John Muhammad and Lee Boyd Malvo, who were also being prosecuted in Virginia. More than a year after the snipers had been convicted in Virginia, Gansler held a trial in Maryland. Gansler stated that the trial only cost taxpayers $2,000, however Sheriff Raymond M. Kight said that the costs had exceeded $743,570, when taking into account costs such as overtime pay to provide security throughout the trial process.
- In November 2003, Gansler became the first sitting prosecutor in Maryland history to be censured by the state's highest court, for improperly discussing evidence, such as a defendant's confession, at news conferences "on more than one occasion", related to three criminal cases. Slate Magazine described him as a "near-perfect specimen of a classic political archetype—the prosecutor on the make," noting that "[h]e's smart, he's well-connected, he's telegenic, and he raises gobs of cash."
- In August 2013, Gansler was tape-recorded speaking disparagingly of his Democratic primary opponent in the 2014 Maryland gubernatorial race, Lieutenant Gov. Anthony Brown, who he accused of relying on race in the contest. "I mean, right now his campaign slogan is, 'Vote for me, I want to be the first African American governor of Maryland,'" Gansler said. His comments provoked outrage.
- On October 12, 2013, The Washington Post published memos written by state troopers alleging that Gansler repeatedly requested officers assigned to him to drive in an irresponsible manner. A spokesperson for Gansler denied the reports.
- On October 24, 2013, the National Journal published a photo showing Gansler at a house party attended by his son in Bethany Beach, Delaware, where underage drinking was taking place. In response, Gansler said he was there briefly, did not notice any underage drinking, and that even if he had, he did not have "moral authority over other people's children" outside Maryland. Gansler later said that in hindsight, he should have assumed there was underage drinking and should have discussed it with the chaperones.

== Personal life ==
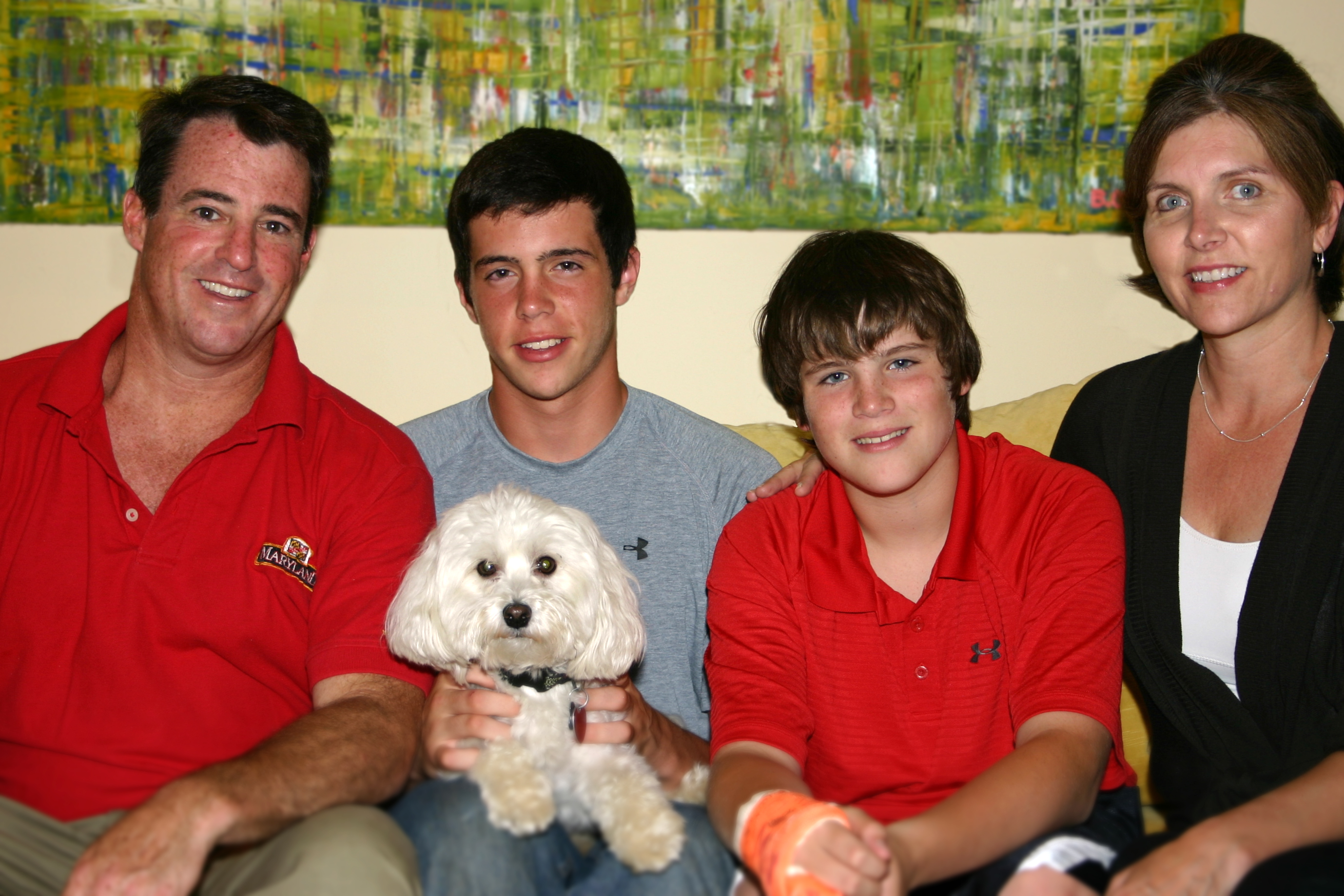
Gansler at home with his sons Sam and Will, and his wife Laura.

Gansler is married to Laura Leedy Gansler, a securities lawyer and author about legal cases. He coaches both his sons, Sam and Will, in a variety of sports. Gansler is Jewish.

Gansler's father, the late Jacques (Jack) Gansler, was Professor of Public Policy at the University of Maryland, College Park, and former Under Secretary of Defense for Acquisition, Technology and Logistics.

Gansler founded a lacrosse league for Baltimore inner-city youth, called Charm City Youth Lacrosse. He mentored at-risk area youth, served on the Montgomery County Commission on Aging, and co-chaired the NAACP Criminal Justice Committee. For his work in establishing the Charm City Youth Lacrosse League, he received the “Innovator of the Year” award from Maryland's largest legal publication.

== See also ==
- List of Jewish American jurists

Legal offices
Preceded by J. Joseph Curran Jr.	Attorney General of Maryland; 2007–2015	Succeeded by Brian Frosh
