= John Morogiello =

American dramatist

John Morogiello (born 16 May 1965) is an American playwright In residence with the Maryland State Arts Council. His plays are often comedic examinations of history, literature, office politics, or a life in the theater. Since 2016, he has served as artistic director of Best Medicine Rep, a theater company located in Gaithersburg, Maryland that specializes in new comedies. Morogiello's work has been compared to that of British playwright Tom Stoppard.

== Early life and education ==
Morogiello was born in Manhattan and adopted at the age of 6 weeks by Basil (Ben) Morogiello and Donna Williams Morogiello. The family moved from Yonkers to Cortlandt Manor, New York in 1966. Morogiello graduated from Walter Panas High School in 1983. While in high school, he began to write sketches with comedian Bill Santiago and Danny Vermont. He spent one year at Texas A&M University before transferring to SUNY Stony Brook, where he graduated with a B.A. in Theatre Arts in 1987. Morogiello received an M.A. in Theatre Arts from SUNY Albany in 1988.

== Career ==
Morogiello began doing a stand up double act with Danny Vermont in the mid-1980s, often performing at The Laugh Factory in Los Angeles. While in college, they wrote and directed a public access cable series called The Walter Moran Show.

After graduating college, Morogiello worked for two years as house manager for Long Wharf Theatre in New Haven, Connecticut, an experience that he used as fodder for some of his plays and stories.

In 1990, Morogiello married high-school sweetheart Elizabeth Kemmerer and moved to Maryland, where he began to find success as an actor, playwright, and dramaturg. His adaptation of Puccini's Gianni Schicchi received its world premiere at the Wyldcliffe Center for the Arts in New Rochelle, NY courtesy of Sacred Clown Theater. The following year, Gianni Schicchi closed out the premiere season of Rep Stage in Columbia, Maryland, and Morogiello's farce The Answer premiered off-off Broadway at The Belmont Italian American Playhouse.

In 1996, Morogiello was awarded a Kennedy Center Fellowship of the Americas to develop his Civil War drama Chancellorsville in Toronto and was named "Best Up and Coming Playwright" by Baltimore Magazine.

His breakthrough came with the play Irish Authors Held Hostage in 2003, which won Best Play, Best Director (Martin A. Blanco), and Best Actor (Morogiello) at the Washington Theatre Festival. The production transferred to the New York Fringe Festival the following year. In 2006, the play returned to Washington, DC, where it played for an extended run at Warehouse Theatre to sold out houses and rave reviews.

Based on the success of Irish Authors Held Hostage, Morogiello began a regular relationship with Oldcastle Theatre Company in Bennington, Vermont and Abingdon Theatre Company off-Broadway, where his plays Engaging Shaw, Blame It On Beckett, Civilizing Lusby, and Play Date were developed and/or produced under the direction of Eric Peterson and Jackob G. Hofmann.

His comedy The Consul, The Tramp, and America's Sweetheart won the 2015 Julie Harris Playwright Award Competition and the Dayton Playhouse FutureFest. Other full length titles include Die, Mr. Darcy, Die!, The Crater Sisters Christmas Special (co-written with Lori Boyd), Civilizing Lusby, and Stonewall's Bust. One acts include Jack The Ticket Ripper, Larry's Resolution, The Little Farmer, and Men and Parts.

Morogiello is a regular contributor to the Flagpole Radio Cafe, a variety show in Newtown, Connecticut.

Morogiello began working as a Teaching Artist with the Center Stage Playwrights in the Schools program in 1997. In 2001, he began teaching as a Maryland State Arts Council Playwright in Residence. He has regularly taught playwriting to students at Potomac, Chevy Chase, Bells Mill, Somerset, Clearspring, and Villa Cresta Elementary Schools. He has provided professional development workshops at the Maryland Artist Teacher Institute, Teaching Artist Institute, and the Maryland Conference for Teachers of English and Language Arts.

== Personal life ==
Morogiello has been married to Elizabeth Kemmerer, a retired federal employee, since 1990. They have two sons.
