= Cockerham bribery case =

US Army bribery scandal

The Cockerham bribery case involved the investigation and subsequent trials of United States Army contracting officers and their family members who were accused of accepting bribes in return for steering multimillion-dollar contracts to companies providing services for the US Army in Iraq and Kuwait between 2004 and 2007. The alleged ringleader of the accused officers was US Army Major John L. Cockerham, who was sentenced to 17 and 1/2 years in prison for accepting bribes from Army contractors. The contracts, mainly for bottled water, involved at least three US Army contracting officers, two of their family members, six companies from India, Saudi Arabia, Kuwait, and the United States, and up to $15 million in bribe money.

== Background ==
Just prior to and during the Iraq War, US Army contracting officers were stationed in Kuwait and Iraq and were charged with contracting for services to support the Army's operations in theater. Contracts for food, water, shelter, and other living essentials, and gravel and chain link fencing were made with numerous US and international companies. By 2007, the US Army had spent $30 billion on contracts to support operations in Iraq.

In 2006, the US Army's Criminal Investigation Command (CID), the Defense Criminal Investigative Service, the Special Inspector General for Iraq Reconstruction, and the FBI began investigating reports of irregularities and corruption involved in the contract operations. Included in the probe were the $10 billion in contracts awarded by the army's Kuwait-based contracting office.

== Investigation and charges ==
The probe quickly focused on contracting officer Major Gloria D. Davis. On December 11, 2006 CID agents questioned Davis at Camp Victory near the Baghdad International Airport (BIAP) after $225,000 was discovered in offshore accounts under her name. According to investigators, the money came from bribes paid to Davis by Kuwait-based Lee Dynamics International, operated by an American contractor named George Lee. That night, after admitting that the money came from bribes, Davis committed suicide.

Following up on leads discovered during the investigation on Davis, investigators' attention was drawn to contracting officer Major John Cockerham. That same month, investigators raided Cockerham's Fort Sam Houston home and discovered a ledger detailing $30 million in kickbacks that the officer expected to receive for steering contracts to certain companies.

On July 22, 2007, Cockerham and his wife, Melissa, were arrested. Three days later, Cockerham's sister, Carolyn Blake, was arrested and charged with helping Cockerham collect $3.1 million in bribes. All three were indicted on August 22, 2007 for conspiracy to commit fraud and bribery, conspiracy to obstruct justice and money-laundering conspiracy. The following month investigators recovered $900,000 in bribe money that had been paid to Cockerham.

Prosecutors stated that Melissa and Blake traveled to Kuwait to collect the bribe money and deposited the money into safety deposit boxes. Later, the money was moved into off-shore bank accounts. As of March 2009, only some of the money had been recovered. Prosecutors stated that it appeared that co-conspirators overseas or other Cockerham relatives in the US were hiding the money.

In November 2007, retired US Army sergeant Terry Hall of Atlanta, Georgia was arrested and charged with bribing Cockerham. Hall's companies, Allied Arms Co. Ltd owned by Shahir Nabeeh Fawzi Audah, Total Government Allegiance/Freedom Consulting & Catering, and US Eagles Services Corp, were reportedly steered contracts in return for the bribes. Hall pleaded guilty on February 17, 2010 to multiple counts of bribery, conspiracy, money-laundering and wire fraud. He agreed to forfeit $80.7 million seized by the US government from Hall's offshore accounts. Hall was sentenced to 39 months in 2012.

On May 27, 2011, federal indictments were unsealed against American businessmen George H. Lee, Jr. and his son, Justin W. Lee of Lee Dynamics International. The two were charged with bribing US Army contracting officers, probably including Davis and Cockerham, with airline tickets, spa vacations and more than $1 million in cash to secure contracts. George Lee, who was the CEO of both companies, was sentenced to 54 months in prison in July 2015 for one count of bribery. In addition, the US federal government blocked 120 other individuals and/or their companies from entering into contracts with the US government.

== Convictions ==
On February 1, 2008 John Cockerham pleaded guilty to bribery, money laundering and conspiracy to commit bribery and Melissa Cockerham pleaded guilty to money laundering. On December 2, 2009 John Cockerham was sentenced to 17½ years in prison and fined $9.6 million, the total amount that he had reportedly received from bribes.

In August 2008, as a result of a related investigation, Army Major James Momon, 37, pleaded guilty to taking $5.8 million in bribes, of which he kept $1.6 million with the rest going to Cockerham. Melissa's sister, Carolyn Blake, pleaded guilty to one count of money laundering conspiracy on March 18, 2009. Blake admitted she expected to keep 10 percent of the money she collected. Another colleague of Cockerham's, former US Army Major Christopher H. Murray, 41, pleaded guilty to receiving $245,000 in kickbacks from Kuwait contracts. In November of 2012, Momon was sentenced to eighteen months. In December 2009 Murray was sentenced to four years, nine months in prison.

Government documents showed that in addition to Hall's companies, other contractors involved included Dewa Projects Private Ltd from India, Lee Dynamics International from Saudi Arabia, and Kamal Mustafa Al-Sultan Co (KMS) of Kuwait.

As part of the investigation into Cockerham, federal investigators have begun a probe of retired Army Colonel Anthony B. Bell. Bell ran the Army's contracting office in Baghdad during the early stages of the Iraq War. Another Cockerham colleague, former US Army Major Eddie Pressley, 39, was charged with accepting $2.8 million in bribes at Camp Arifjan. Eddie Pressley was sentenced to 144 months, while his wife Eurica Pressley received 72 months.

In a related case, in December 2009, former DoD civilian employee Tijani Ahmed Saani, 53, was sentenced to nine years in prison and ordered to pay a $1.6 million fine and $816,485 in restitution to the Internal Revenue Service for accepting bribes and tax evasion. Saani had worked with Cockerham at Camp Arifjan, Kuwait in 2004 and 2005. Saani admitted that he could not explain how he earned $3.6 million in income during that time. Saani had deposited the money in bank accounts in Ghana, Switzerland, the Jersey Channel Islands, the Netherlands and the United Kingdom.

In March 2010, retired US Army Colonel Kevin A. Davis agreed to plead guilty to taking more than $50,000 in bribes from George H. Lee in exchange for helping Lee's company, American Logistics Services, win a contract to operate warehouses for the Army in Iraq. After retiring in 2005, Davis became a senior executive for another company owned by Lee, Lee Dynamics International (LDI), based in Kuwait. LDI has since been banned from working any contracts with the US government and Lee has been indicted by US prosecutors.

On 1 March 2011, a federal jury convicted Major Eddie Pressley and his wife, Eurica Gaston Pressley. The two were charged with taking $2.8 million in bribes in the Cockerham case, including $1.5 million from United Arab Emirates-based importer Ohio Foodstuffs Trading. On 5 January 2012, Eddie Pressley was sentenced to 12 years and prison and was ordered to forfeit $21 million, land, a vacation resort timeshare, and two vehicles.

In a related case, former US Army major Charles J. Bowie Jr pleaded guilty to one count of money-laundering on 11 May 2011. In 2011, Justin W. Lee, the son of George H. Lee, also pleaded guilty. In a related case, retired U.S. Army sergeant Terry Hall was sentenced on 20 March 2012 to 39 months in prison and will forfeit millions in cash and property acquired through the bribery and money-laundering. Hall had acted as a go-between with Cockerham and Momon while the crimes were committed.

In a related case, on 25 June 2012 Army Sergeant 1st Class Richard Evick of Parsons, West Virginia, and Crystal Martin, a former master sergeant from Pontiac, Michigan, were convicted of 17 counts including bribery and money laundering. While at Camp Arifjan in 2005 and 2006, Evick accepted $170,000 in bribes from two defense contractors. Martin then laundered the money through bank accounts in Kuwait and the US.
