= Gansler Commission =

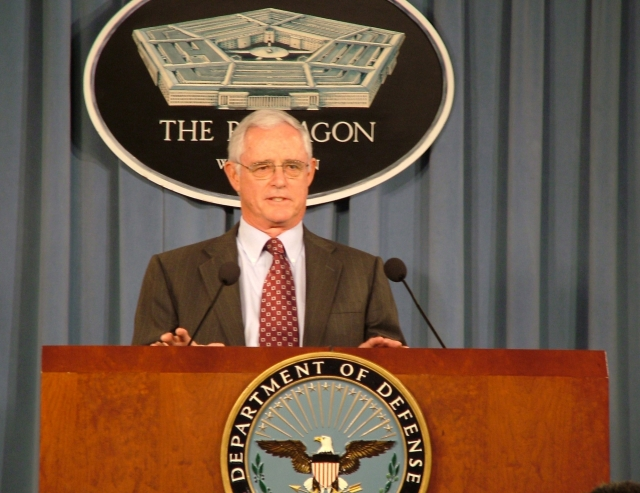
Dr. Jacques Gansler reported findings of his six-member special commission on 1 November 2007, recommending that the Army hire almost 2,000 additional contracting officers and provide more training to its acquisition workforce.

The Gansler Commission investigated the contingency contracting crisis in 2007, named after its chair, Jacques S. Gansler, a former Under Secretary of Defense for Acquisition, Technology and Logistics. In August, then United States Secretary of the Army Pete Geren established the independent Commission on Army Acquisition and Program Management in Expeditionary Operations to review recent operations and provide recommendations. This commission released what became known as the Gansler Report in October 2007. Commission members include David J. Berteau, former principal deputy assistant secretary of defense (resource management & support); retired Gen. Leon Salomon, former commander, Army Materiel Command; retired Gen. David M. Maddox, former commander, U.S. Army Europe; retired Rear Adm. David R. Oliver Jr., former director, Office of Management and Budget, Coalition Provisional Authority, Iraq; and George T. Singley III, former DoD deputy director, research and engineering.

== Contingency Contracting Crisis ==
- In August 2006, United States Army Lieutenant Colonel Marshall Gutierrez, a senior logistics officer in Kuwait, was arrested, and accused of shaking down a laundry contractor for a $3,400 bribe. After his arrest, he was released to his quarters and was found dead a few days later next to an empty bottle of prescription sleeping pills and an open container of what appeared to be antifreeze.
- In October 2006, United States Army Sergeant Denise A. Lannaman, a soldier working for Colonel Gutierrez, died of a gunshot wound, perhaps believing she would be interviewed about the colonel's contracting improprieties.
- In December 2006, United States Army Major Gloria D. Davis killed herself with a gunshot wound to her head, the day after confessing to accepting $225,000 in bribes while a contracting officer in Kuwait.
- In July 2007, United States Army Major John L. Cockerham was arrested for orchestrating a large bribery scheme in Kuwait and Iraq. In what became known as the Cockerham bribery case, this military officer issued multimillion-dollar contracts to companies providing services between 2004 and 2007. He was later found guilty and sentenced to 17 and 1/2 years in prison for accepting bribes.
- Besides these high-visibility suicides of contracting and logistics professionals, there were some 20 military and civilian United States Army employees charged in more than 70 criminal contract-fraud cases.

== Gansler Report ==
External videos
- "Urgent Reform Required: Army Expeditionary Contracting, the Report of the Commission on Army Acquisition and Program Management in Expeditionary Operations", hearing of the U.S. Senate Armed Services Subcommittee on Readiness and Management Support, December 6, 2007, C-SPAN

=== Findings ===
When the Gansler Report was released on 31 October 2007, Dr. Gansler identified three key findings: not enough people, too little training, and an antiquated contracting system. This report did not address any suspected criminal cases being investigated internally within the Army and the Justice Department. Although the media recognized this effort as the broadest examination of the problems to date with potentially the most far-reaching recommendations for fixes, Congressional lawmakers were still concerned that the Army took too long in one of their recommendations, that of creating a special contracting corps, one that Congress authorized a few years prior.

=== Recommendations ===
The commission outlined four areas as critical to future success:

1. Increased stature, quantity and career development for contracting personnel—both military and civilian, particularly for expeditionary operations;
2. Restructure of the organization and responsibility to facilitate contracting and contract management;
3. Provide training and tools for overall contracting activities in expeditionary operations; and
4. Obtain legislative, regulatory, and policy assistance to enable effective contracting, which is important in expeditionary operations.
