= 464th Chemical Brigade (United States) =

- Brigade Shoulder Sleeve Insignia
- Active: 20 October 1953 – 31 January 1968; 22 February 1972 – 16 September 2008
- Country: United States
- Allegiance: United States Army Reserve
- Role: Chemical, biological, radiological, and nuclear support
- Size: Brigade
- Part of: First United States Army
- Motto(s): We Serve In Silence

The 464th Chemical Brigade was a chemical unit in the United States Army Reserve from February 1972 until September 2008.

== Mission ==
To provide command and control of two to six chemical battalions and other assigned or attached separate companies at Corps level. To provide staff planning and coordination for the combat, combat support, and combat service support operations for all assigned and attached units. To allocate units and resources in support of chemical, biological, radiological, and nuclear (CBRN) reconnaissance, decontamination, biological detection, and smoke operations. And, to conduct civilian decontamination in response to a domestic accident or deliberate CBRN incident.

== Motto ==
We Serve In Silence is the motto of the 464th Chemical Brigade. This motto connotes the silent, but deadly force of the weapons that the chemical corps built to combat and the silent, dirty, thankless, yet life-saving job that the chemical soldier performs with the utmost expertise, dignity, and honor.

== History ==
This unit was constituted on 20 October 1953 in the Army Reserves as the 464th Chemical Group and assigned to First United States Army. It was officially activated in New York City on 1 December 1953. It was later inactivated on 31 January 1968. On 22 February 1972, the unit was assigned to Third United States Army and activated at Orlando, Florida. The unit was transferred from Third United States Army to Second United States Army on 1 October 1983. After being reassigned back to First United States Army in June 1987, it was reorganized from the 464th Chemical Group to the 464th Chemical Brigade. And, it was relocated to Johnstown, Pennsylvania. The unit was inactivated on 16 September 2008.

== Previous Commanders and Units Commanded ==
The following is a list of all of the commanders of this unit from 1972 until its inactivation in 2008, along with the units they commanded.

464th Chemical Group in Orlando, Florida
Group Commanders
Commander	Dates
COL James B. Sullivan	February 1972 – September 1974
LTC Johnnie L. Gray, Jr.	September 1974 – September 1977
LTC Robert B. Martin	September 1977 – March 1978
COL James T. Craig	March 1978 – November 1980
LTC Howard E. Lang	November 1980 – March 1981
COL Myron B. Barrow	March 1981 – June 1984
LTC James W. Wolfe	June 1984 – August 1984
COL Daniel B. Curtis	August 1984 – June 1987
Units Commanded
Unit	Dates
186th MOB DES Detachment	January 1975 – April 1981
305th Finance Section	April 1972 – October 1976
310th MOB DES	April 1972 – June 1987
310th Military Intelligence Detachment	April 1972 – January 1975
344th Medical Detachment	April 1972 – January 1975
345th Military Police Company	April 1972 – January 1975
349th Medical Detachment	April 1972 – January 1975
372nd Public Information Detachment	April 1972 – January 1975
383rd Military Police Detachment	April 1972 – January 1975
442nd Personnel Service Company	April 1972 – November 1977
445th Medical Company	April 1972 – January 1975
467th Military Intelligence Detachment	April 1972 – October 1974
479th Military Intelligence Detachment	April 1972 – October 1974
574th Military Police Platoon	April 1972 – January 1975
674th Transportation Company	January 1975 – June 1987
1083rd RTU	April 1979 – April 1981
3379th Logistics Command (RTU)	April 1972 – January 1975
3396th RECSTA	April 1972 – June 1987

464th Chemical Brigade in Johnstown, Pennsylvania
Brigade Commanders
Commander	Dates
COL James R. Harvey	June 1987 – March 1988
BG Leonard L. Hoch	March 1988 – March 1992
COL Bernard Kosowski	March 1992 – July 1993
COL Gary G. Gallo	July 1993 – December 1996
COL Richard T. Whitman	December 1996 – November 1999
COL Richard J. Kiehart	November 1999 – January 2003
COL Paul H. Dietrich	January 2003 – January 2006
COL Scott S. Haraburda	January 2006 – October 2007
COL Gregory A. Ritch	October 2007 – September 2008
Units Commanded
Unit	Dates
485th Chemical Battalion	October 1988 – September 2007
336th Military Police Battalion	October 1988 – November 1995
128th Military Intelligence Battalion	November 1995 – September 1996
458th Engineer Battalion	November 1995 – September 2007
463rd Engineer Battalion	November 1995 – August 1996
383rd Military Intelligence Battalion	October 1996 – September 1999
392nd Signal Battalion	January 1998 – September 2000
444th Personnel Services Battalion	October 2004 – January 2006
365th Engineer Battalion	October 2006 – September 2007

== Sources ==
- Nist, Mary (2008), 464th Chemical Brigade Unit History.
- Nist, Mary (2008), "464th Chemical Brigade: The Final Chapter" (PDF), Army Chemical Review, no. Winter 2008, pp. 30–32, archived from the original (PDF) on 19 October 2012
- The Institute of Heraldry, 464th Chemical Brigade., archived from the original on 23 June 2008
- Third United States Army (14 February 1972), GENERAL ORDERS NUMBER 98: Activation of the 464th Chemical Group.
