= 203rd Military Intelligence Battalion =

Technical intelligence unit of US Army

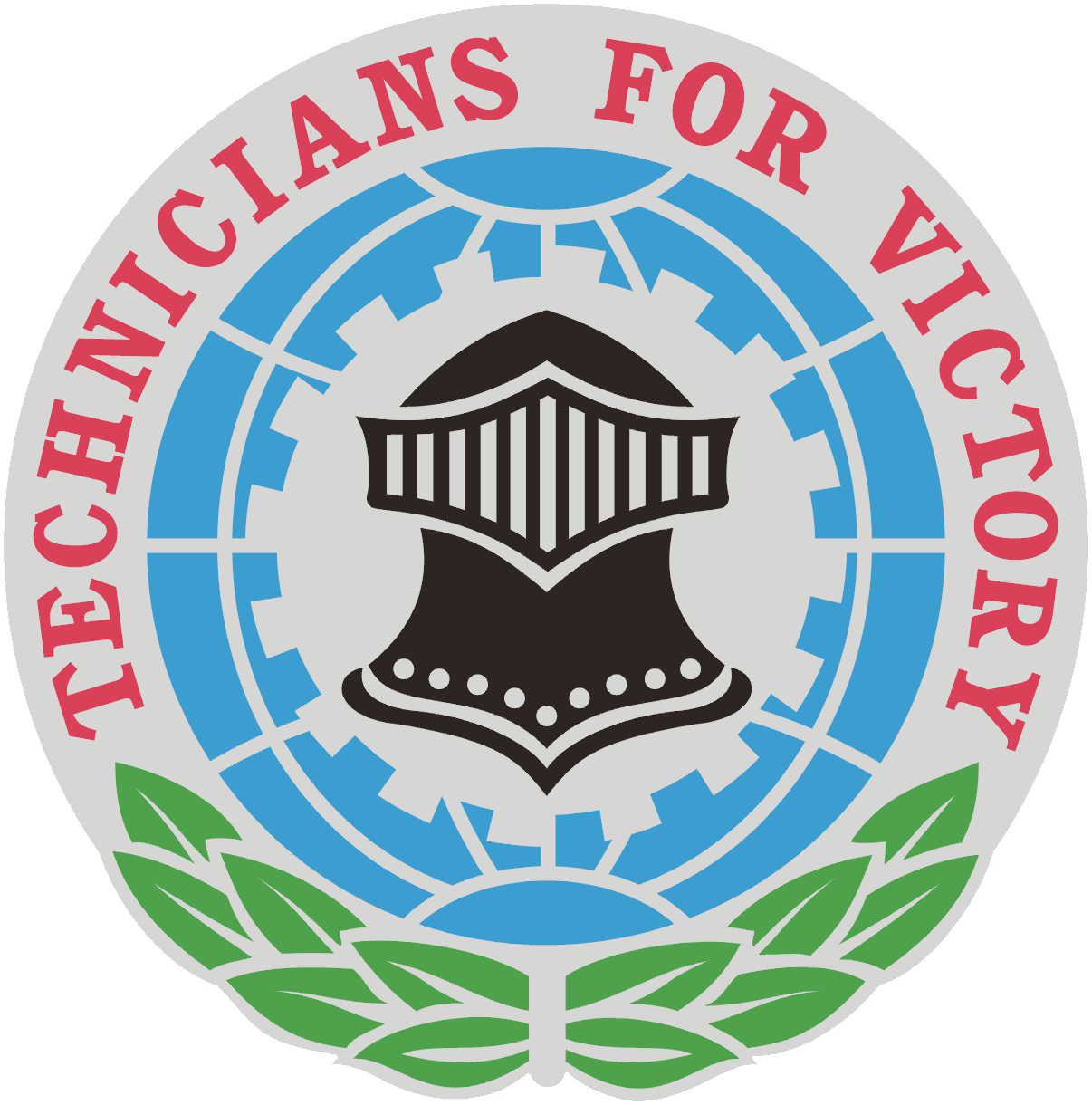
- The battalion's distinctive unit insignia
- Active: 1982–present: 1982–1989 (Regular Army); 1989–1996 (as Foreign Material Intelligence Battalion); 1996–1998 (Regular Army); 1998–2001 (Regular Army multi-component unit); 2001–2011 (Army Reserve multi-component unit); 2011–present (Army Reserve)
- Country: United States
- Branch: United States Army
- Type: Military intelligence
- Role: Technical intelligence
- Size: Battalion
- Part of: Military Intelligence Readiness Command's Military Intelligence Training Support Command (TSC)
- Headquarters: Edgewood Area, Aberdeen Proving Ground, Gunpowder, Maryland, US
- Nicknames: "Wizards of War" (special designation)
- Motto: Technicians for Victory
- Colors: Oriental Blue; Silver Gray
- Anniversaries: 2 October (date constituted)
- Engagements: See list: Cold War; Operation Urgent Fury; Operation Just Cause; Gulf War; Operation Desert Shield; Operation Desert Storm; UN Actions; Somali Civil War; Haitian Civil War; Yugoslav Wars; Bosnian War; Kosovo War; IFOR; SFOR; War on terror; War in Afghanistan; Iraq War; Operation Avarice; Operation Inherent Resolve; Resolute Support Mission
- Decorations: See list: Meritorious Unit Commendation; Superior Unit Award

Commanders
- Current commander: LTC Christopher K. Harnisch

Insignia
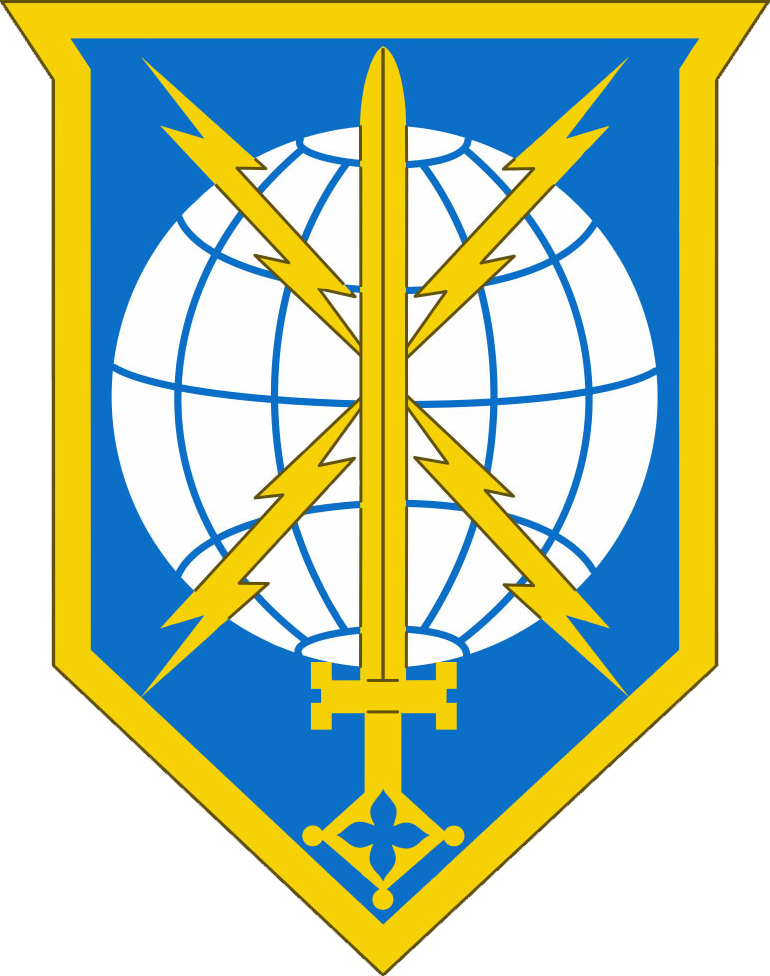
- Military Intelligence Readiness Command Shoulder Sleeve Insignia

- Map symbol (MIL-STD-2525D)

The 203rd Military Intelligence Battalion (Technical Intelligence) is the sole technical intelligence (TECHINT) collection and foreign material exploitation (FME) unit of the United States Army and a battalion in the Army Reserve. The 203rd obtains and exploits captured enemy materials, maintains one of the premier test and evaluation inventories of adversary equipment and weaponry in the US military, and supports specialized tasking including counter-terrorism, special reconnaissance, and direct action missions. Much of the units work is conducted in close collaboration with the National Ground Intelligence Center. The battalion's intelligence products provide TECHINT support to INSCOM, the Defense Intelligence Enterprise, the broader US Intelligence Community (IC), the Five Eyes, NATO, and foreign allies and partners.

With a lineage tracing back to World War II, the unit has deployed detachments in every major ground conflict involving the United States since 1982. During contingency operations, the battalion is operationally gained as a theater-level asset, and can report directly to any command or echelon assigned. From 1998 to 2011, the 203rd was one of a small number of multi-component units combining regular army and reserve companies in one battalion. As of 2023, the unit is composed of around 300 soldiers from 48 different occupational specialties, and is headquartered in the Edgewood Area at Aberdeen Proving Ground in northern Maryland. In 2022, the unit was awarded for achieving the highest standard of training and readiness of any battalion in the Army Reserve or National Guard.

== Role ==
The role of the 203rd is unique in the Army and DoD as a whole, operating in a joint, interagency, intergovernmental, and multinational capacity, producing predictive and tailored intelligence using captured enemy materiel to provide US forces with an better understanding of foreign capabilities. According to Army Doctrine Reference Publication (ADRP) 2–0, Intelligence, the 203rd is tasked to "prevent technological surprise, assess foreign scientific and technical capabilities, and develop countermeasures designed to neutralize an adversary's technological advantages." The unit accomplishes this assignment through conduct of sensitive site exploitation (SSE) and exploit of reconnaissance capabilities, equipment, weapons systems, munitions, documents and materials (DOMEX), forensic evidence, biometric data, and other materiel of foreign origin which is captured, recovered, or otherwise acquired. During a conflict, one of the units primary tasks is establishing the Captured Material Exploitation Center as a hub to cache, evaluate, and process all captured materials in theater.

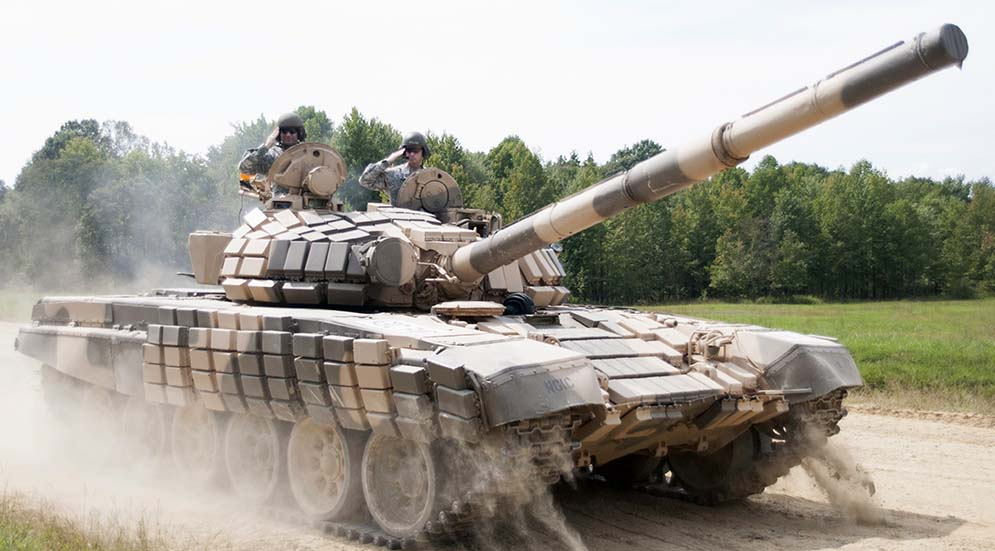
Russian T-72 with NGIC markings on the 203rd's test track.

The units intelligence products closely support and collaborate with civilian and military partners within the Intelligence Community, counterparts within the Five Eyes, as well as allies and partners such as South Korea.

The 203rd is tasked as an "always available" unit, meaning it must be prepared at all times to deploy in support of Overseas Contingency Operations. As a result, the unit is oriented toward operational support to maintain unit readiness. Beyond the intelligence gathering mission, the unit also develops and provides training and certifications on foreign weapons, vehicles and other equipment, and conducts emergency technical intelligence missions in support of any TECHINT requirement of overseas operations.

The 203rd is also tasked with maintaining the following abilities specified in Field Manual (FM) 2–0, Intelligence:

- Establish and operate the Captured Materiel Exploitation Center (CMEC).
- Conduct TECHINT collection and reporting in support of validated S&TI.
  - Act as the HQDA executive agent for foreign materiel used for training purposes.
  - Conduct TECHINT training for DoD and reserve component TECHINT personnel.
  - Support INSCOM's foreign materials acquisition and exploitation operations as directed.
  - Analyze and exploit foreign captured enemy documents, equipment, weapon systems, and other war materiel.
- Report on the capabilities and limitations of enemy combat materiel.
- Provide reports alerting the command to the tactical threat posed by technical advances in new or recently discovered foreign or enemy materiel.
  - Provide countermeasures to any enemy technical advantage.
  - Provide foreign or enemy equipment for troop familiarization and training.
  - Provide recommendations on the reuse of captured exploited material
- Supervise the evacuation of TECHINT items from the conflict zone
- Provide battlefield TECHINT teams to support a subordinate command's TECHINT effort.

== Organization ==
The unit is under the organization of Military Intelligence Readiness Command's Theater Support Command (TSC), but is closely aligned with INSCOM's National Ground Intelligence Center (NGIC), which previously had control of the unit. The battalion is garrisoned at the Army's center of test and evaluation, Aberdeen Proving Ground, Maryland. Its headquarters is co-located with NGIC's Foreign Materiel Operations Division, whose foreign material archives are populated predominantly by materials recovered by the 203rd. Command of the battalion is a lieutenant colonel's billet. Most members of the 203rd are reservists who report for duty one weekend a month and two weeks a year, while a cadre of full time soldiers and civilians provide day-to-day operational, logistical and administrative continuity. The battalion's approximately 300 soldiers are organized into a headquarters company (HHC) and four line companies:

Headquarters & Headquarters Company (HHC): The HHC conducts mission command, provides and coordinates support for the battalion on all functions and other basic requirements to ensure the success of the unit; includes the S1, S2, S3, and S6 sections for support.

A, B & C Companies: Conduct TECHINT operations; foreign vehicle exploitation, foreign weapons exploitation, site exploitation, Weapons Technical Intelligence (WTI), IED identification, and Foreign System Familiarization.

D Company: Exploitation and Warehousing—Maintains accountability of captured materiel, creates target packages on Captured Exploitation Materiel (CEM) for TECHINT teams, analyzes and exploits CEM to determine new/special capabilities; receives, tracks and stores CEM for shipment to scientific exploitation centers; and supports exploitation efforts conducted by other organizations with subject matter experts. Their analytical cell provides battlefield intelligence analysis to TECHINT teams. Develops and prioritizes national level and combatant commanders TECHINT requirements. A significant portion of the equipment and materials processed by D Company are maintained and secured within NGIC facilities.

== History ==
=== Origins ===
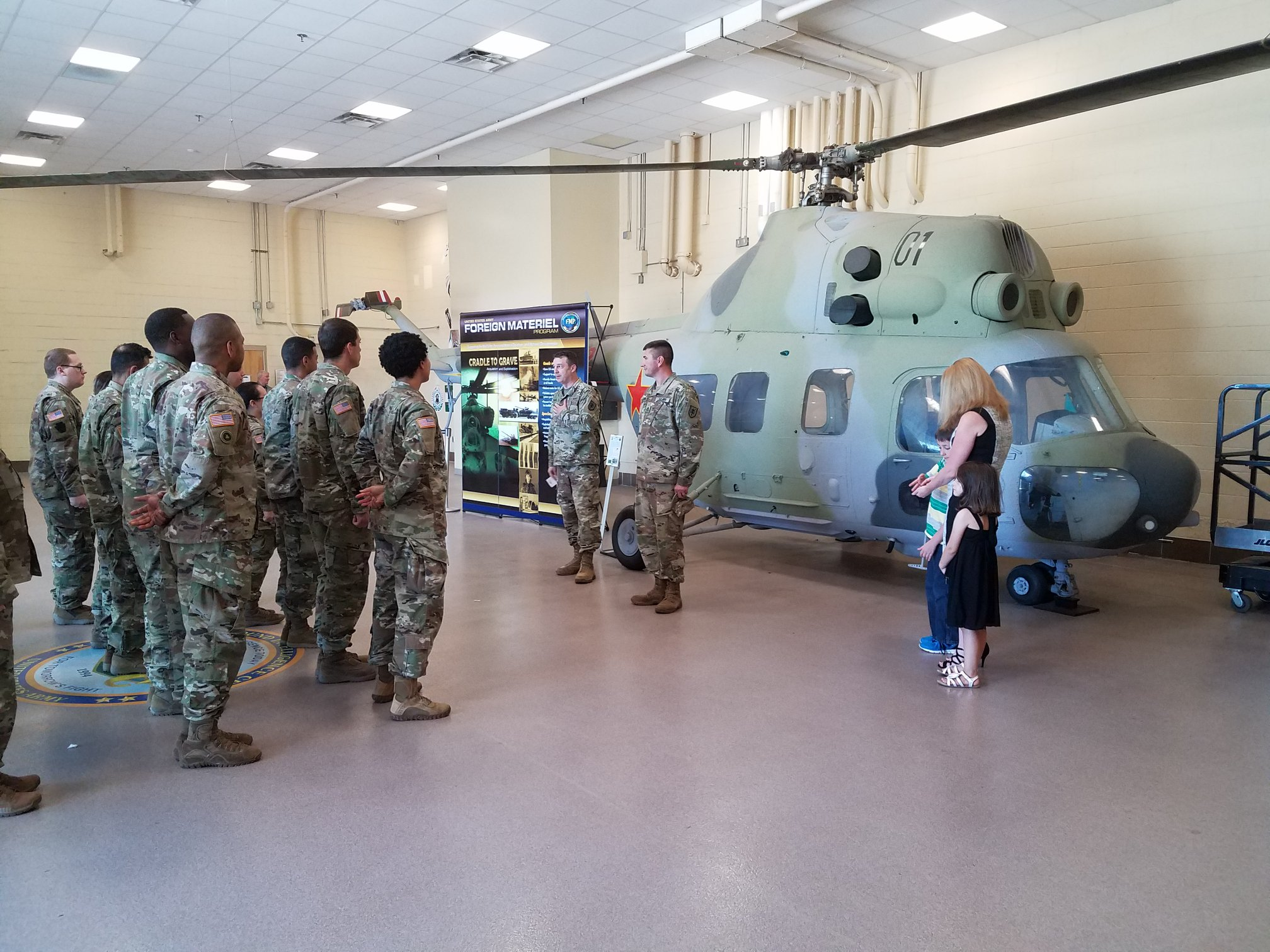
The lobby of the 203rd's headquarters at Aberdeen where a Mil Mi-2 sits on display in the markings of the Soviet Air Forces.

The 203rd traces its lineage to the Army's reputed Ordnance Technical Intelligence Teams of World War II, established in 1943. After American forces struggled with considerable losses at the hands of the German technological surprises in North Africa, G.I.s fighting Axis forces began to receive issues of the "well-illustrated and plainly-worded" intelligence bulletins which provided advice for identifying or rendering inoperable a variety of enemy weaponry and equipment. The unit's concept was revived for the Korean War and later the Vietnam War, where for the first time a designated Captured Materiel Exploitation Center was set up in-country to streamline materials analysis and exploitation, a task which would become a core competency of the 203rd. The foreign material exploitation unit concept was finally formalized at Fort Bragg, North Carolina as Delta Company, 519th Military Intelligence Battalion, XVIII Airborne Corps. During both wars, the unit's bulletins emerged as a reputed source among allied units with interest in the capabilities of the enemy's newly introduced RPG-7 and Soviet PT-76 amphibious tanks.

In 1975, the Army conducted the Intelligence Organization and Stationing Study, which recommended significant changes to Army intelligence, including the 203rd. At the same time, the military had a growing need for analysis and exploitation of a flood of material captured by Israeli intelligence, which in turn had been sold to the United States. The findings led to the inactivation of D Company at Fort Bragg, and the reorganization of the unit as the 11th Military Intelligence Company, stood up 30 September 1978, at Aberdeen Proving Ground, under the command of LTC Dwight W. Galda. During the period of 1975 to 1988, the unit operated out of old wooden WWII-era buildings on the base. The newly independent company was assigned to the Army's Intelligence and Threat Analysis Center, and tasked additionally with providing assistance to the Army's Opposing Forces (OPFOR) Support mission, operating Soviet equipment and weaponry in full scale mock battles at Fort Irwin National Training Center, California. As a result of the Army's increasing demands, the unit grew in size, redesignated the 11th Military Intelligence Battalion (Provisional), 29 February 1980, with LTC James A. Bartlette assuming command. After the transition, the OPFOR mission was tasked to Company C, a detachment permanently located at Ft. Irwin. In 1996, Charlie Detachment grew to a company and would continue to provide support to the NTC OPFOR until the early 2000s (approx. 2004) when it was inactivated.

=== Battalion constituted ===
In 1982, a major reorganization of military intelligence lead to the creation of the 513th Military Intelligence Group, (loosely comparable with a brigade) which was given command of three new battalions in support of the Army component of CENTCOM: the 201st, 202nd, and 203rd Military Intelligence Battalions. The 203rd was officially constituted 2 October 1982 in the Regular Army as Headquarters and Headquarters Company, 203rd Military Intelligence Battalion (Provisional). It immediately assumed command of the 11th Military Intelligence Company, which remained in existence subordinate to the battalion, along with the detachment at Ft. Irwin, and during periods of conflict, additional command of the 364th MI Company (TECHINT) at Hanscom Air Force Base, Massachusetts.

=== Reorganization ===
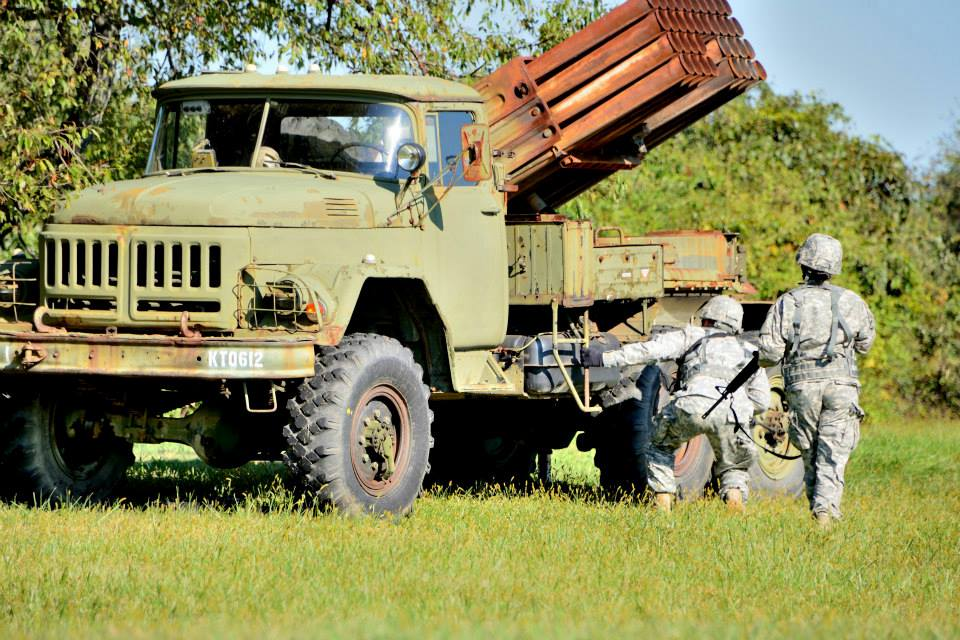
Soldiers of the 203rd training on a BM-21 Grad "Grad-1" (9P138).

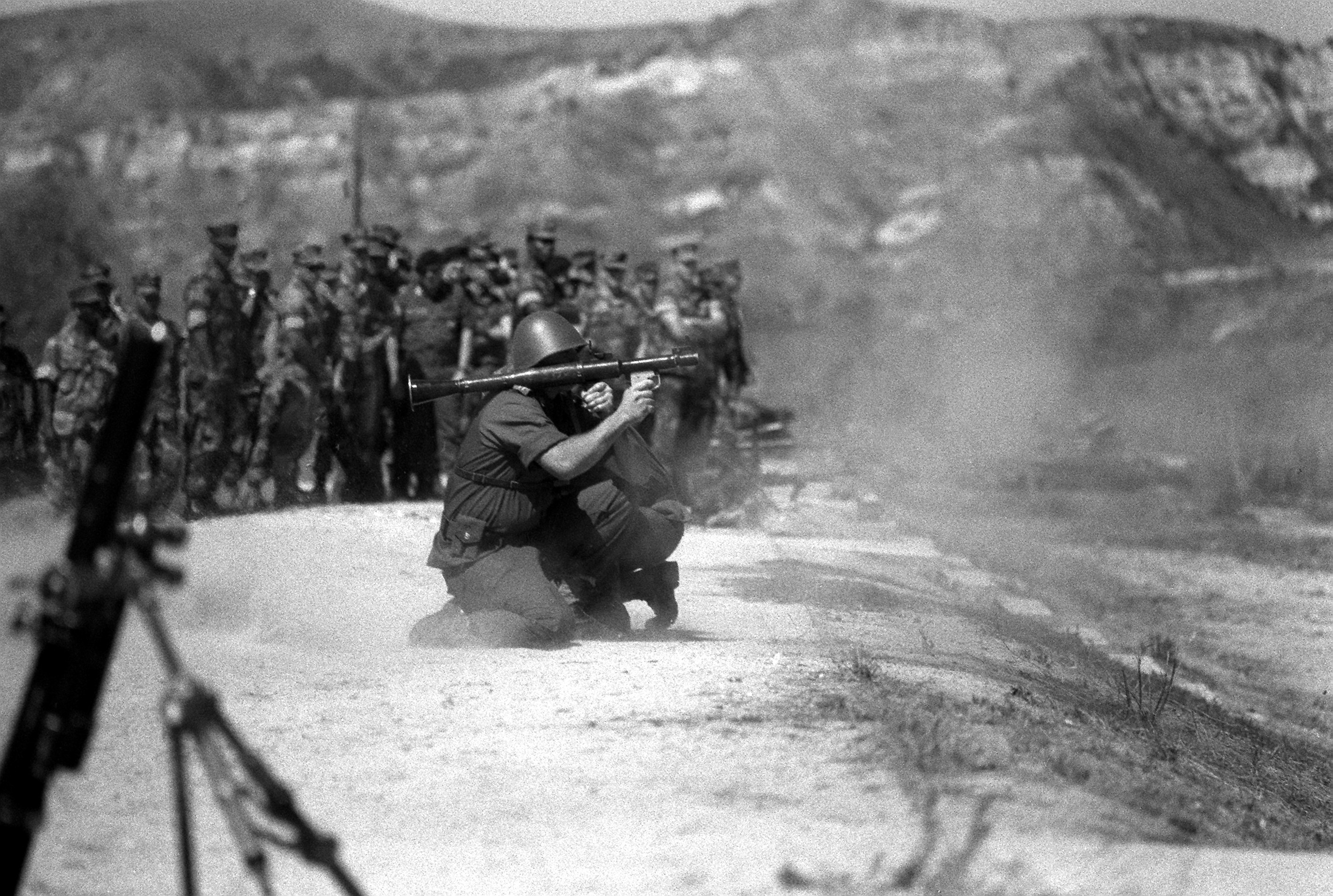
A member of the Foreign Material Intelligence Group demonstrates an RPG-7 at Fort Irwin, California in 1989.

On 1 October 1986, INSCOM activated the Foreign Materiel Intelligence Group as a TDA unit at Aberdeen Proving Ground. The 203rd was subordinated to the FMIG immediately following the activation. In the process, the 203rd lost 23 percent of its personnel, and was stripped of the global TECHINT mission in favor of a more tactical intelligence mission set. The lost responsibilities were reassigned to the larger FMIG, which reported directly to INSCOM. The intent was to reorient military technical intelligence efforts nearly entirely toward tactical intelligence, with the intelligence production mission reassigned to the Army Intelligence Agency, INSCOM planned to orient operations around requirements that field commanders may face. The FMIG was designated a non-deployable unit, and tasked with interfacing with scientific, civilian intelligence, and other military TECHINT components. In 1987, the Group absorbed several smaller MI companies. On 16 October 1988, it activated A Company to incorporate the additional personnel.

=== Subordination and deactivation ===
In a ceremony at Fort Monmouth, New Jersey, 16 October 1989, the Foreign Materiel Intelligence Group was reorganized, consolidated down to a battalion size unit, and combined with its subordinate – the 203rd – and the resulting unit was redesignated the Foreign Materiel Intelligence Battalion. At the conclusion of the consolidation the battalion had 191 personnel, and was subordinated to the 513th Power Projection Brigade, Fort Gordon, Georgia.

=== Inactivity ===
While temporarily deactivated for seven years, the 203rd remained in existence in form and function contiguously from its inactivation in 1989 to its later reactivation, with the 11th MI company remaining in existence under the FMIB during the 203rd's inactivation.

=== Reactivation ===
Towards the end of operations in Panama, structural changes at INSCOM lead to the 203rd's reactivation. Stateside, the National Ground Intelligence Center (NGIC) was upgraded from its previous provisional status to a permanent unit, and the 513th Ml Brigade was witnessing substantial reconfiguration. The FMIB was discontinued and its mission, personnel, and assets assumed by a provisional form of the 203rd already in place. On 15 October 1996, almost exactly a year later, the battalion's longest running contiguous component, the 11th Military Intelligence Company, was inactivated. The following day, the 203rd shed its provisional status and was fully reactivated at Aberdeen Proving Ground, Maryland as the tactical arm of the National Ground Intelligence Center.

=== Multi-component unit ===
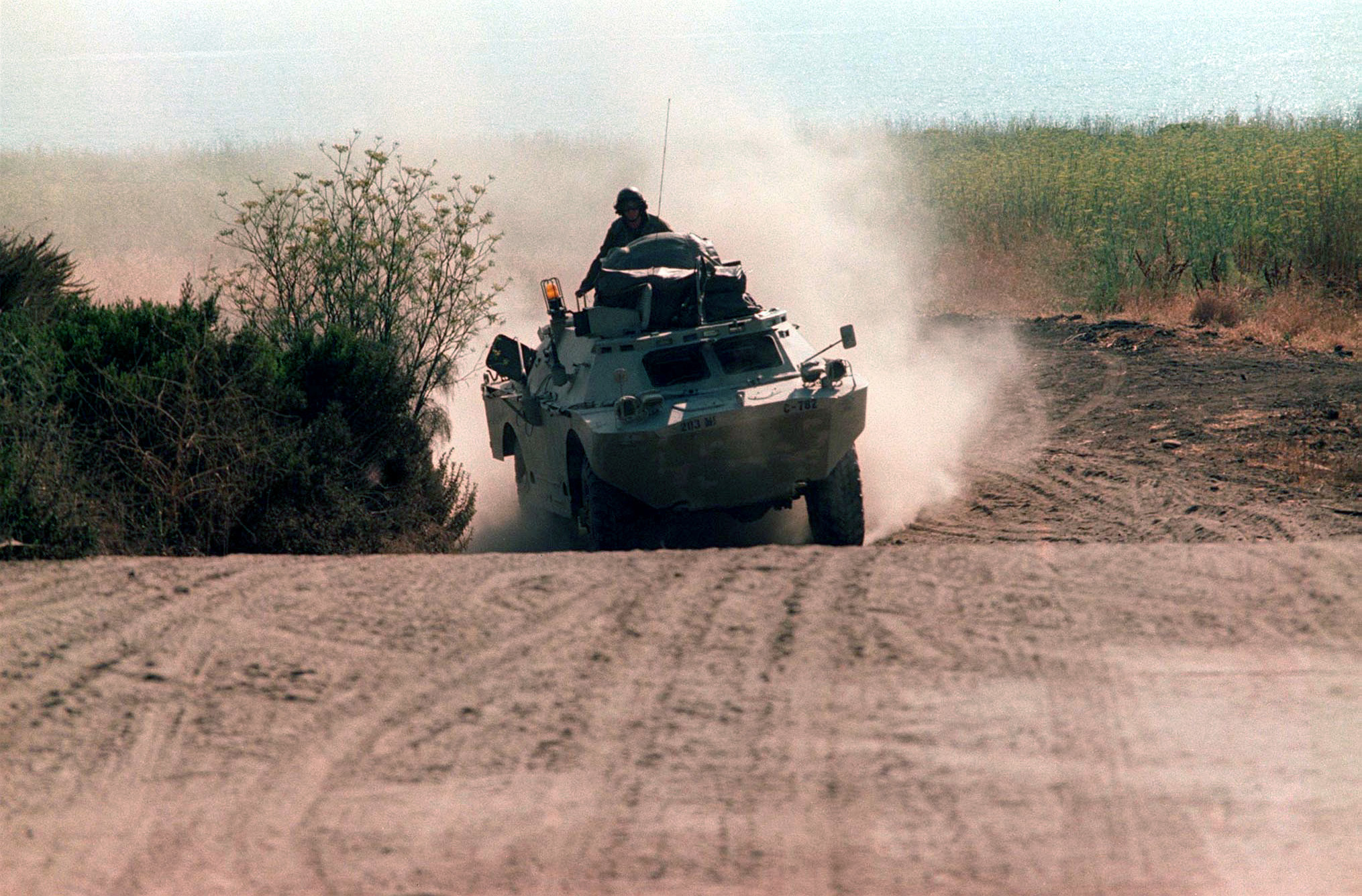
Marines from 1st Marine Division pilot a BRDM-2 from the 203rd during exercise Kernel Blitz '97

On 13 July 1999, the 203rd was instructed to begin transitioning to a multi-component unit (multicompo or MCU), incorporating active duty and reserve soldiers in one unit. The change was intended to support both day-to-day collection and analysis of materiel with the capability to quickly bring in and deploy additional assets as required by real world situations. Changes were myriad, with the 203rd absorbing two reserve MI companies, the 383rd and 372nd, shedding the number of active duty soldiers by 75 percent, and shifting to Army reserve command while retaining direct mission tasking from the National Ground Intelligence Center. When mobilized, the unit was to be subordinated to whichever active duty headquarters was listed in its mobilization orders, regardless of echelon, whether brigade or field army. When the transition was complete 16 June 2001, the 203rd was left with five companies - the battalion commander, along with primary staff officers and two of its line companies were reservists. Headquarters and A Company were active duty troops. Three companies were based at Aberdeen, with one detachment at Fort Irwin, California, and one at Fort Devens, Massachusetts. From the beginning of the Iraq war through 2004, the battalion was subordinate to the 513th Military Intelligence Brigade in Iraq Reserve command.

In 2005, the battalion came under operational control of FORSCOM and the new Military Intelligence Readiness Command (MIRC), the intelligence functional command of United States Army Reserve. During this time the battalion was briefly under the operational control of the 205th Military Intelligence Brigade, until the effects of the Abu Ghraib scandal caused a significant reorganization of that brigade. During this time the unit remained under the administrative control of NGIC, which itself was under a part of INSCOM, with operational control split between INSCOM and the civilian Defense Intelligence Agency. In 2009 the unit was moved from the administrative control of INSCOM to MIRC. Despite the shift to reserve administrative control, the battalion remained a combination of active duty and reserve companies.

=== Full reserve unit ===
The unit reached its current configuration in late 2011 when the battalion became fully a reserve component, losing its active duty companies, and 96-hour deployment capability. Until 2022, the unit was subordinated to MIRC's National Intelligence Support Group, whose units primarily support uncommon or one-off missions. Currently the unit falls under MIRC's Military Intelligence Training Support Command (TSC).

== Active duty battalion (1980–2000) ==
=== Functions ===
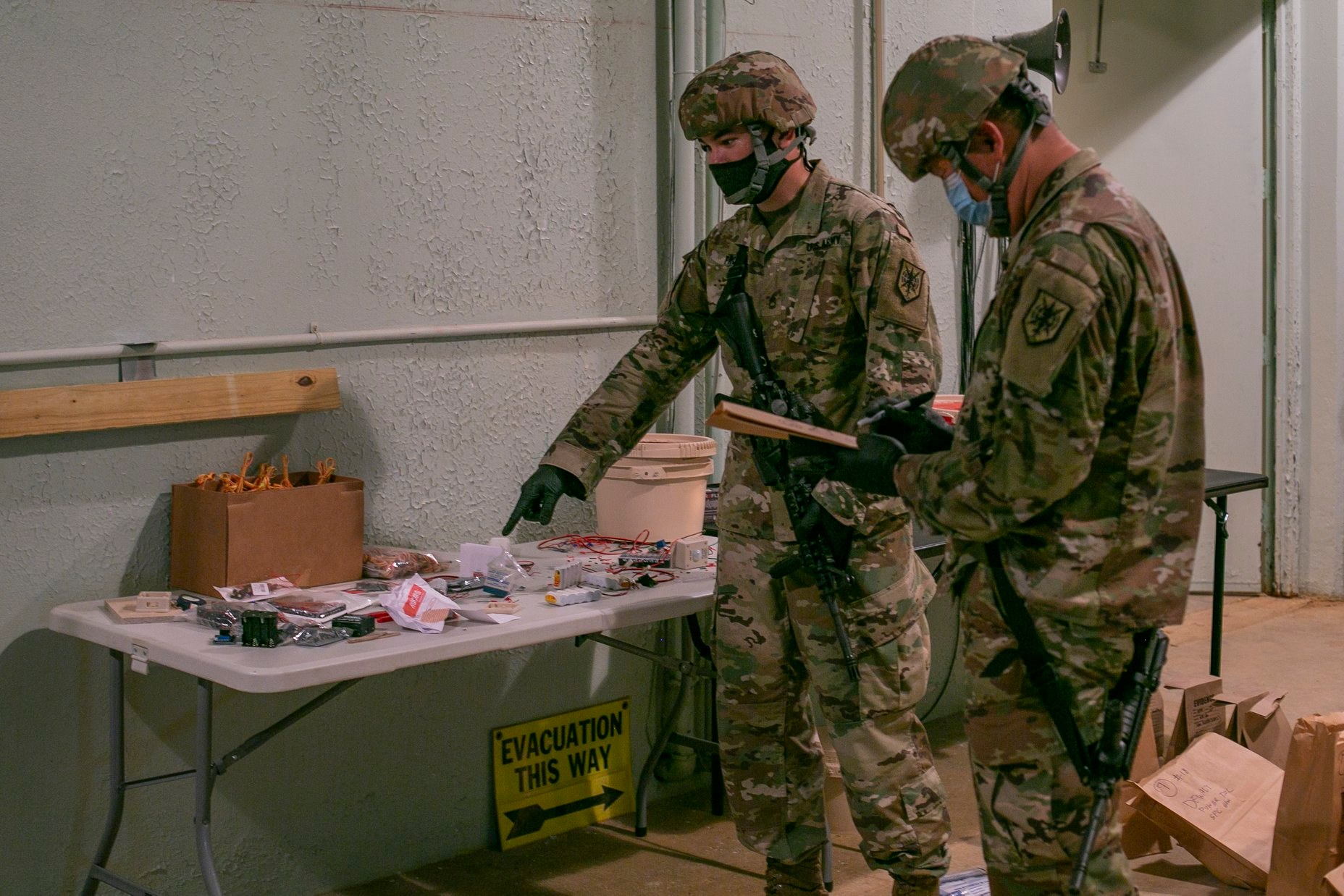
Soldiers from the 203rd examining detonators in a suspected homemade explosives lab during training.

During the 1980s, the unit grew from a company size to a battalion, taking on a range of new assignments at several points in time. Throughout much of the decade, the 203rd played a key role in educating candidate Foreign Service Officers as a component of the State Department's training and indoctrination course. The battalion taught differences in equipment, weapons and doctrine between NATO and Warsaw Pact governments. As time went on the unit established a consistent presence in alliance maintenance operations, with heavy involvement in training and integration of foreign partner forces. In October 1995, components of the 513th Military Intelligence Brigade, including much of the 203rd as well as the 372nd MI Company deployed to the Republic of Korea to participate in exercise Foal Eagle 95, on a large scale simulated combined TECHINT mission with counterparts from the ROK Armed Forces.

=== Deployments ===
==== Grenada ====
Following US forces inserting into Grenada 25 October 1983, large quantities of foreign military equipment were discovered requiring TECHINT support. Two elements of the 203rd MI Battalion, 513th MI Group, were deployed to Grenada. Five days after Operation Urgent Fury began, five soldiers from the 203rd participated as members of a Defense Intelligence Agency team formed at the request of the Commander in Chief Atlantic Fleet, operational commander of Urgent Fury. The first element arrived in Grenada on 31 October 1983 and was tasked to identify, sort, and provide approximate inventories of foreign material and to establish priorities for shipment to the US. Nineteen other soldiers established the 203rd MI Battalion (Forward) on 6 November, and operated a modified CMEC. Together the soldiers classified material, developed inventories; assisted combat units in searches for materiel; operated a collection point for materials, and shipped important items to the US.

==== Panama ====
In 1990 the battalion deployed soldiers in support of Operation Just Cause, identifying and cataloging more than 25,000 foreign material items and weapons evacuated from Panama.

==== Gulf War ====
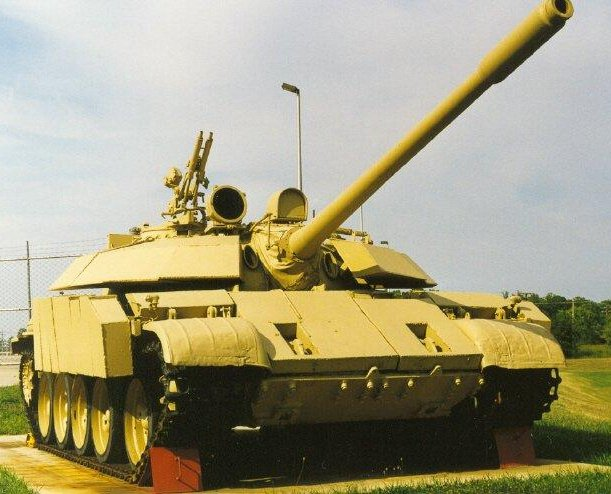
The 203rd's Iraqi T-55 Enigma previously served as gate guardian.

As tensions flared and Iraq pushed into Kuwait, the 513th Military Intelligence Brigade, including the 203rd, arrived in-theatre in October 1990 to support US Central Command. By the time Congress authorized the use of force against Iraq on 12 January 1991, the 203rd was already analyzing Iraq's capabilities. The following day the 203rd deployed to Saudi Arabia in support of XVIII Airborne Corps, and established the JCMEC there on 15 January, supported by staff from the Defense Intelligence Agency, Army Intelligence Agency, and allied TECHINT experts in the Royal Air Force, Canadian Army, and others. Subsequently combined JCMEC (C/JCMEC) TECHINT teams were stood up, and deployed into Iraq. Members of the 203rd were in teams 2 and 3, which supported MARCENT and VII Corps.

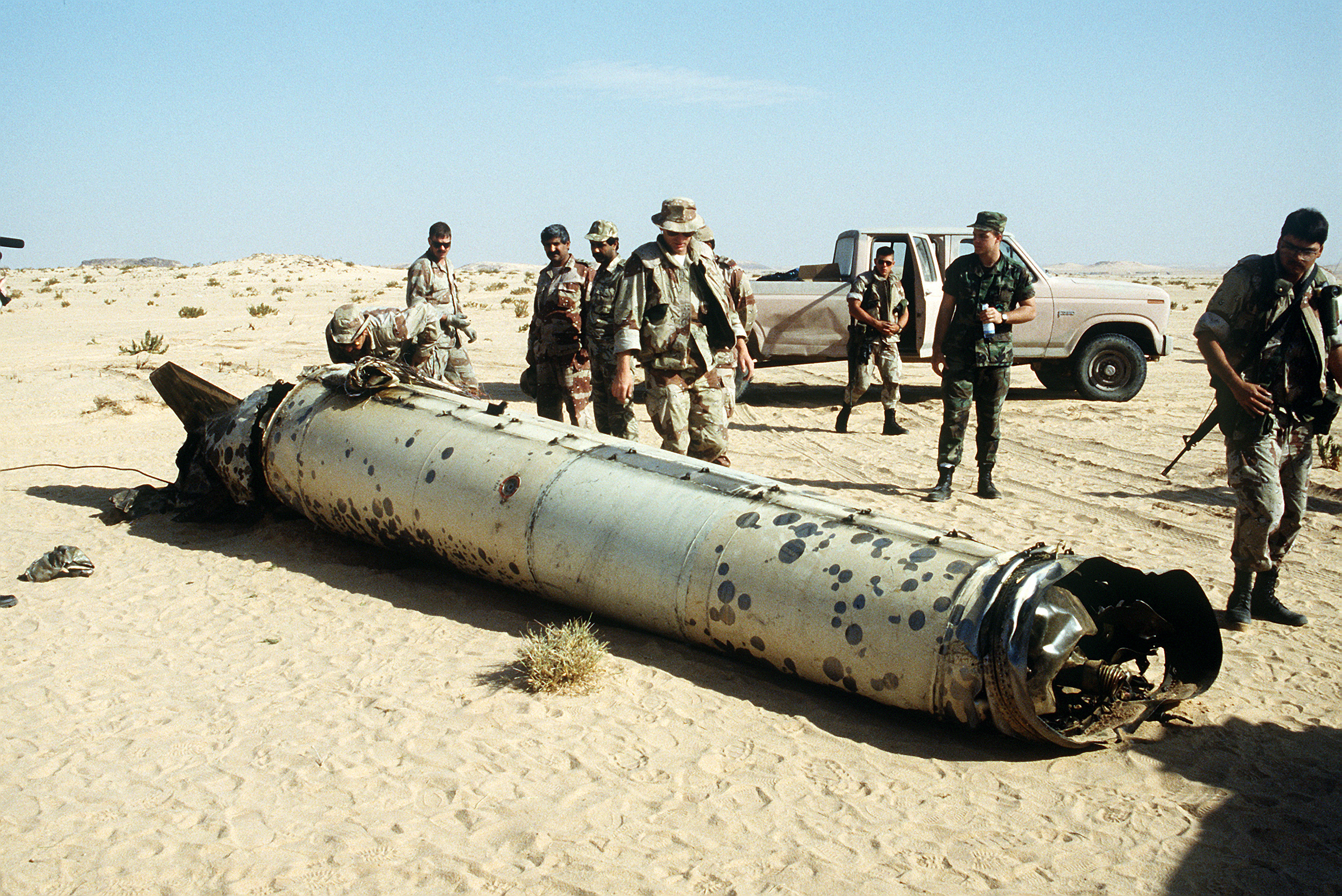
US troops examine an Iraqi Scud intercepted by a Patriot battery, 1992.

By 17 January, materials were being recovered from the first engagement of the war, the battle of Khafji. Among the materials recovered from the city was an Iraqi T-55 Enigma, a variant of the Soviet main battle tank given to Iraqi battalion commanders which was upfitted with indigenous non-explosive reactive armor that resisted light and medium-strength anti-tank weapons. After analyzing the armor in coordination with NGIC weapons experts, the 203rd developed a method with which American forces could counter its effect. Only a handful of this variant of the T-55 are known to remain in existence, one remains with the 203rd at Aberdeen. The C/JCMEC also served a critical role when allied forces tracked down the remains of three Scud missiles. The 203rd examined the fragments, and helped designer Raytheon and the Army develop changes to the Patriot air defense system which improved its effectiveness against the Soviet-made ballistic missile. In total during Operation Desert Storm, the 203rd was responsible for having obtained six out of one US intelligence agency's "top 10" list of desired foreign materiel items. It captured 207 additional items new to American intelligence.

During the conflict, US forces ability to detect biological weapons in the field was extremely limited, consisting only of experimental sampling systems and laboratory testing undertaken by a small group responsible for the whole theater of operation. Compared to the sophisticated chemical weapons detection regime in place, the military was concerned about being caught off guard. The FMIB stepped in to solve the problem, taking command of the 9th Chemical Detachment of the 9th Infantry Division, Fort Lewis, Washington, providing operations, rations, administrative, training, personnel, and logistical support to enable a vast expansion of operations. The detachment consisted of a headquarters section, seven three-man biological detection teams and five chemical/biological detection teams. With them came a detachment from the US Army Technical Escort Unit. On 1 February 1991, sampling teams dispatched to locations across the theater, including Riyadh, Dhahran, Kuwait City, Nasiriyah, and several locations across Southern Iraq. No biological warfare agents or munitions were ultimately detected. For much of the war, the contingent of the unit based in Saudi Arabia was located near Dhahran at Khobar Towers, which later became a nickname for the battalion's barracks back at Aberdeen, until the towers were bombed in 1996 by Hezbollah Al-Hejaz.

==== Somalia ====
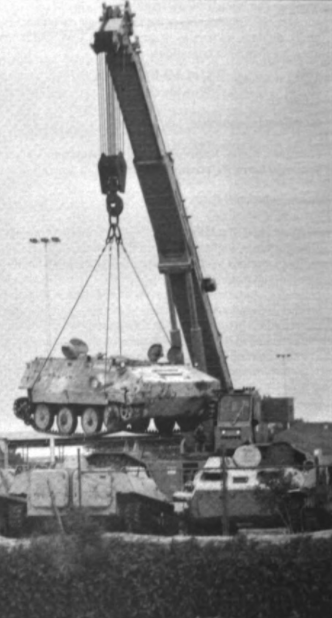
Members of the 11th MI Company extricating Iraqi equipment from Kuwait in 1994

In 1992, the 203rd deployed a TECHINT liaison team as part of Operation Restore Hope within United Nations Operation in Somalia II, embedded with US special operations units. On 16 December 1992, the 203rd deployed a detachment in support of II Marine Expeditionary Force, the core headquarters for Joint Task Force (JTF) Somalia, and established operations at the US Embassy compound in southwest Mogadishu on 18 December. On 21 December, the detachment accompanied a delegation from JTF Somalia headquarters on a tour of compounds controlled by rival warlords in Mogadishu. During the 5 to 10 minutes the group was inside of each of the five compounds, personnel compiled lists of the foreign and US weapons, equipment, and ordnance controlled by the warlords. This order of battle (OB) intelligence was key in planning the eventual US forces attack against one of those compounds. After determining there was no theater-wide plan for the collection and processing of captured enemy materials, the detachment established a Centralized Weapons Collection Center (CWCC). In conjunction with explosive ordnance disposal personnel, the CWCC processed, screened for intelligence value, and disposed of tens of thousands of captured weapons and rounds of ammunition. On 6 January, several SA-7 man-portable SAMs were captured in the Mogadishu area. In conjunction with EOD personnel, and with input from the US Missile and Space Intelligence Center, the detachment reported that the missiles were functional. This intelligence prompted a change in the air defense artillery threat status and flight operations in Somalia. On 14 January, several French MILAN antitank missiles were captured in the Mogadishu area. The unit conducted testing and evaluation with personnel from the French contingent. The missiles proved to be key intelligence, determined to be functional and capable of defeating all but the heaviest armor in the conflict.

==== Haiti ====
In September 1994, the battalion deployed a 14-soldier TECHINT contingency support detachment (CSD) and a 2-soldier liaison element to Haiti in support of US Operation Restore Democracy. The CSD established the forward JCMEC in Port-au-Prince, subsequently retrieving, identifying, and storing more than 10,000 foreign weapons, including those received as part of a "Cash for Guns" program. The CSD screened, processed, and inventoried over 10,000 weapons and thousands of rounds of ammunition by hand. The resulting database provided analysts a tool for assessing the threat to US forces as well as the success of the "Cash for Guns" program. Additionally, the inventory was organized by serial number and forwarded to law enforcement agencies to aid in arms smuggling investigations. At the time of redeployment, CSD personnel had accomplished all TECHINT collection requirements, and played key roles in several signals intelligence (SIGINT) and human intelligence (HUMINT) operations.

==== Bosnia ====
The 203rd deployed personnel to Bosnia with the NATO Implementation Force (IFOR) two days before Thanksgiving in 1996. The unit touched down in the region as part of Operation Joint Endeavor just as the International Criminal Tribunal for the former Yugoslavia began in earnest, with highly publicized arrest warrants for senior figures in the conflict including Radovan Karadžić and Ratko Mladić. While deployed, the unit identified and documented more than 300 novel pieces of ordnance, and inspected combat vehicles and manufacturing plants. Five times the units reporting prompted fundamental shifts in force protection posture for all deployed NATO forces. The 203rd's work on the ground in Bosnia continued through the transition of the NATO stabilization mission to SFOR, continuing through at least March 2000. The battalion suffered one casualty in Bosnia, when in July 1997 a specialist died at a British field hospital following a motor vehicle accident north of Donji Vakuf, in the British-controlled Multi-National Division (South-West) area of operation.

== War on terror ==
=== Iraq War ===
==== Preparation ====
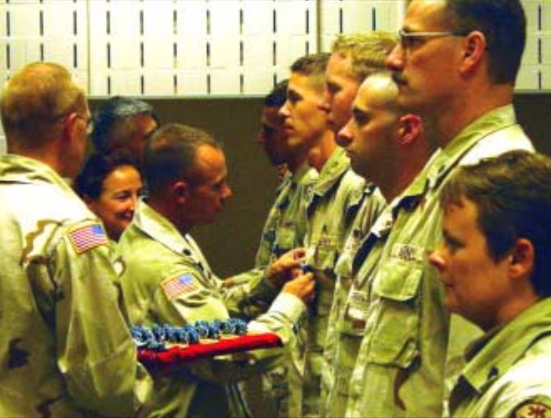
Members of the 203rd return from the battalion's first 6-month rotation to Iraq.

In October 2002, members of the battalion staff were briefed on the Coalition Forces Land Component Command (CFLCC) vision of the 203rd's role in upcoming operations in Iraq. The two active duty companies of the battalion were ready to deploy, but the four reserve companies were woefully underprepared in personnel, equipment, and training. Upon discovering this, INSCOM leaders ruthlessly gutted the battalion, quickly and involuntarily transferring select soldiers to the 203rd from across the Army. By the time the reserve companies and part of headquarters company deployed at the end of April, a full two-thirds of their personnel had not been members of the battalion the prior October. The battalion commander, executive officer, S3, and one company commander were new to the battalion, and all of the company commanders were new to their positions. On 26 December 2002, the 203rd's A Company (an active duty company) received orders to deploy to Kuwait by 22 January 2003. Arriving in theater after transportation delays 30 January, the company staged at Camp Udairi, Kuwait. On 4 February, the reserve component of the battalion was mobilized. On 19 March 2003, the remaining 218 members of the unit's reserve companies were officially recalled to active duty.

==== Invasion ====
After training for three months in the austere northern Kuwaiti desert, A Company crossed the berm into Iraq with V Corps and 1st Marine Expeditionary Force (MEF) 5 and 6 April 2003, while the remainder of the battalion was staging in several locations in theater, including Udairi and Camp Doha, Kuwait. On 29 April (incidentally also Saddam's birthday), B Company entered Iraq by convoy from Udairi, escorted by Special Forces. By 5 May battalion commander LTC James "Boe" Young reported to families back home that the entirety of the battalion was moving into Iraq within the following week. HHC and B Company arrived in Kuwait without their equipment, which was coming by sea, while C Company flew with their equipment. The battalion would either have to wait in Udairi for the equipment to arrive, or borrow equipment to move into Iraq and begin collecting. Worse still, the 203rd's doctrine was designed for conventional conflicts, in which the 203rd would 'bring up the rear' sifting through material safely once an area was secured. The unit lacked training and weapons to operate in the semi-permissive environment that suddenly existed in Iraq. The battalion commander described his decision at the time:

First, the sooner we get started, the sooner we will finish. Second, the security situation is reasonable now but may deteriorate over time as the resistance elements get more organized. Third, the looting is severe and any equipment that is out there and on our collection list could well be lost two months from now. I gave the group about four days to get used to the heat and the time change before moving into Iraq. One of my fellow battalion commanders is a friend from Georgia. His unit has spent the entire war at Udairi and is anxious to help in any way. He agreed to loan us about 15 vehicles and trailers and a mobile kitchen until our equipment arrives. I also got the [513th MI] Brigade to agree to provide me 54 of their long-range surveillance (LRS) platoon soldiers—all excellent infantrymen—to serve as security elements during movement and missions. This is the first of many handshake deals with friends that will prove to make up the backbone of our logistical support going forward."

– LTC James V. "Boe" Young Jr.

The LRS soldiers from H Company (Long Range Surveillance), 221st MI Battalion, were utilized extensively, accompanying almost every JCMEC collection mission.

On 11 and 12 May, B Company and Headquarters Company moved to Tallil Air Base to establish the C/JCMEC. Its mission was to pack and ship the captured materials concentrated there by British and US Navy TECHINT units that had already moved forward to Baghdad International Airport. B Company, 3d Platoon (responsible for warehousing) was the primary element that carried out this mission, while its 2d Platoon (tasked with exploitation) conducted local collection and exploitation missions. After accompanying the move to Tallil, the battalion commander, portions of the operations and intelligence staffs, and C Company established the C/JCMEC Forward at Baghdad International Airport. The 203rd collocated with the British TECHINT experts already there. The 203rd then began planning and coordinating the task fell of evaluating hundreds of weapons cache sites in the immediate Baghdad area, including the arduous task of assessing and prioritizing equipment and sites to visit based on potential TECHINT value.

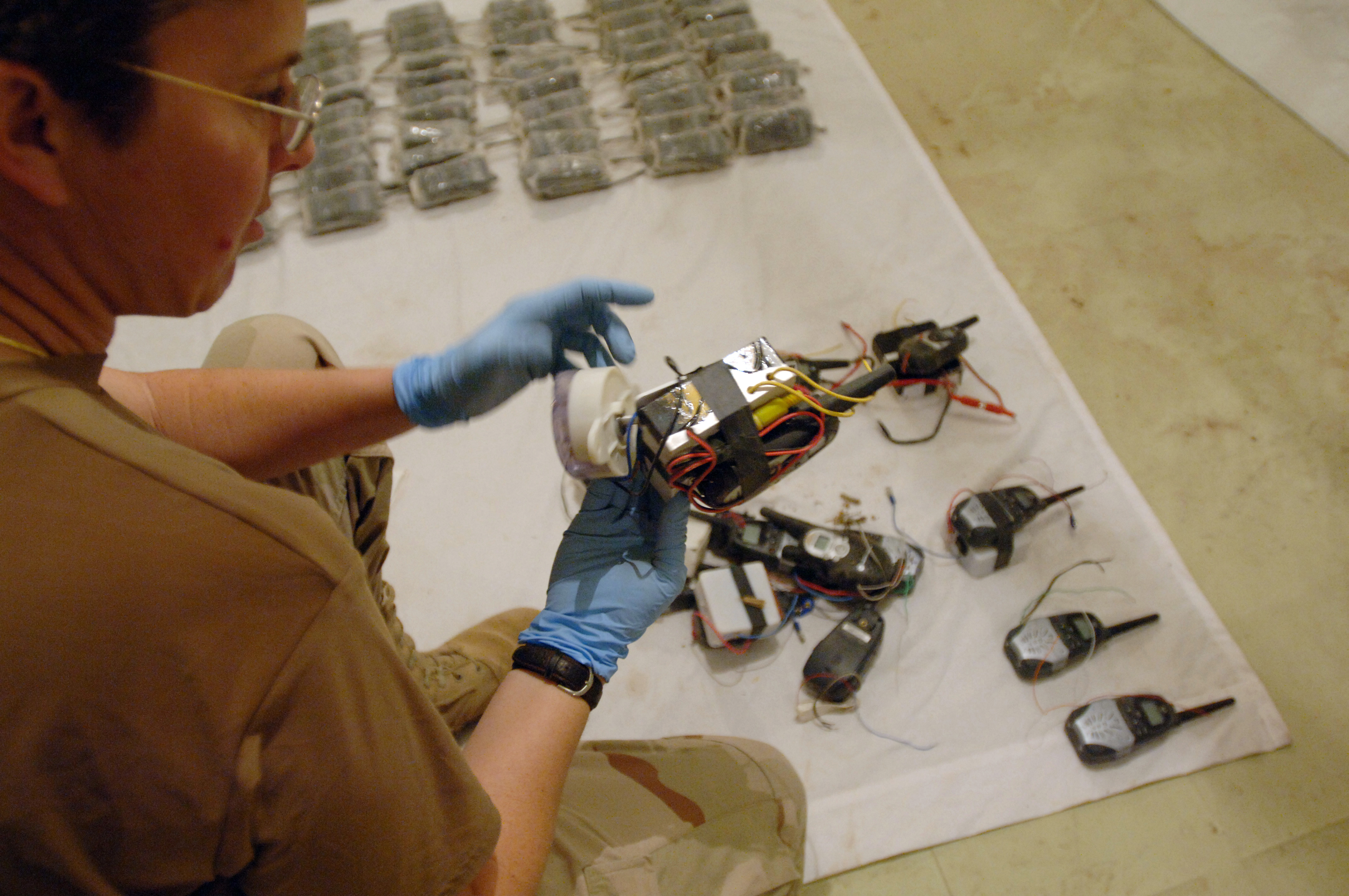
Analysts from the 203rd examining recovered IED components in a Captured Material Exploitation Center in Hawija, Iraq.

A Company performed more than 100 missions from bases at Al Hillah, Al Kut, Balad, and Baghdad. Typical collection mission involved clearing sites of unexploded ordnance and booby-traps before conducting site exploitation procedures. The team photographed each site and gathered measurements and specifications of the equipment found. Specific reports, called complementary technical intelligence reports, were compiled to send to higher echelons and requesting national agencies.

By 1 June nearly the entire battalion had moved into Iraq, with Bravo Company and most of headquarters encamped at Tallil Air Base, near Nasiriyah, and A and C company as well as the command group in Baghdad, waiting for the entire battalion to consolidate at their position where they had stockpiled captured materials in "two or three main storage areas around Baghdad." In his 1 June letter, Young reported having conducted over 100 joint missions in the greater Baghdad area with coalition partners from the UK and Australia, as well as elements from the Defense Intelligence Agency and security from a group of clandestine long-range surveillance (LRS) infantry. Of the geographically separated detachments, he reported the group in Tallil had exploited over 300 pieces of enemy equipment, while a detachment in Doha, Qatar was positioning equipment and processing foreign materials shipments out of Iraq. June 2003 was a significant month for the 203rd and the C/JCMEC, within the month both were consolidated at Baghdad International Airport, and the combined element came under command of the newly formed Iraq Survey Group (ISG). On 25 June, LTC Young reported the 203rd's first direct enemy attack of the war in the form of a roadside IED, which caused minor shrapnel injuries to some members of the LRS team. By that time, the units work in Iraq had already become the largest technical intelligence collection effort since WWII.

==== Operation Avarice ====
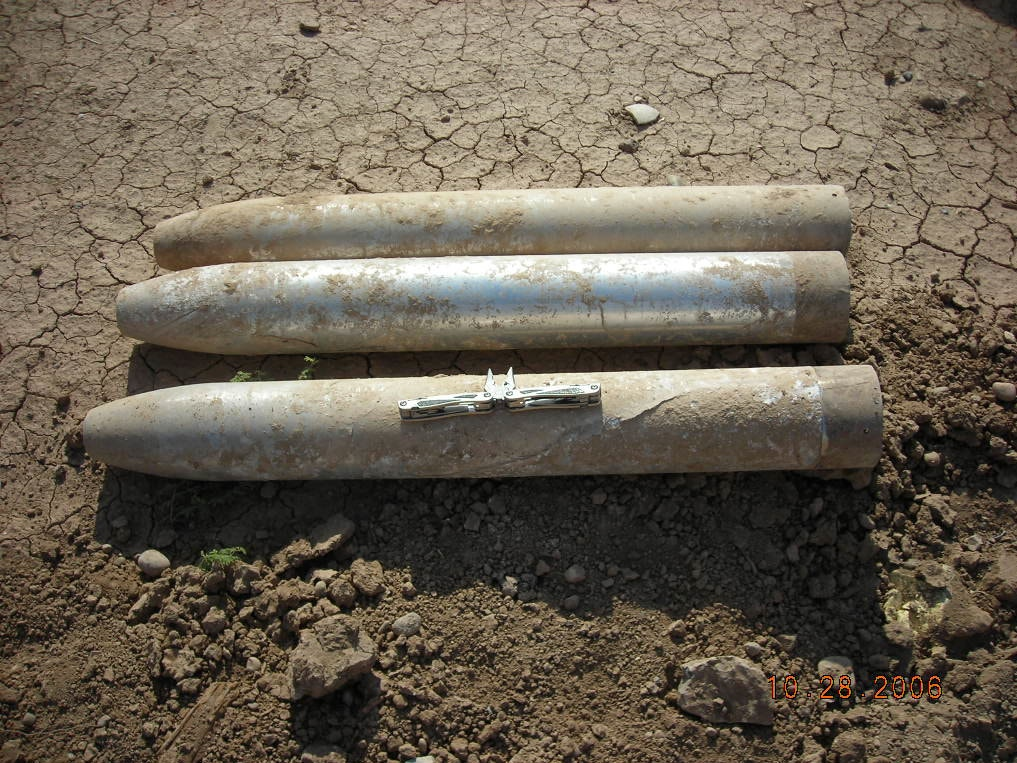
Iraqi Borak Sarin Gas canisters

Since the start of the war, the Iraq Survey Group had been working to collect and catalog weapons of mass destruction throughout Iraq. In 2005, a collaborative effort with the Central Intelligence Agency Baghdad station and Army HUMINT yielded an Iraqi source in possession of remnant chemical weapon stockpiles and munitions dating to the countries abandoned weapons program. Materials exploitation specialists from the 203rd as well as chemical specialists and ordnance disposal units were assigned the task of assessing and aiding the destruction of recovered weapons. Ultimately, at least 400 Borak rockets designed for use with the Soviet BM-21 Grad were acquired, evaluated, and destroyed. Many of the shells were in poor condition, and some were empty or held nonlethal liquid, but some of the weapons analyzed contained the toxic nerve agent Sarin in far higher concentration than analysts had expected given their age. As they processed the munitions, the 203rd held some shells back from the stockpile slated for destruction for dissection and evaluation, which they conducted with a cast iron bathtub and a drill on the premises of the Iraq Survey Group headquarters at Camp Slayer.

==== Buried Iraqi fighter jets ====
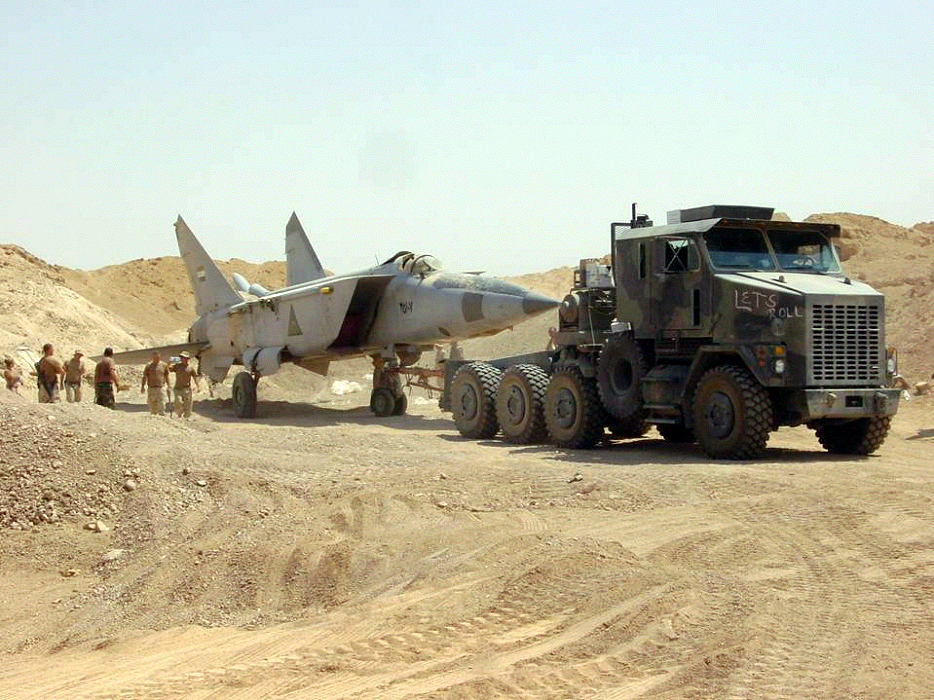
Members of the 203rd unearth a MiG-25RB at Al-Taqaddum Air Base

In early July 2003, 1st Platoon, Charlie Company of the 203rd was investigating whether weapons of mass destruction were located at Al-Taqaddum Air Base, 75 miles west of Baghdad. During the search of the facility, a soldier spotted the vertical stabilizer of an aircraft poking out of a sand dune. The group excavated the site, and in turn located several buried MiG-25R and Su-25 aircraft. One MiG became known for a photograph taken as it was extricated from the sand. In it, members of the 203rd were towing the aircraft with an M1070 tractor that had let's roll, the last reported words of United Airlines Flight 93 victim Todd Beamer, written on the cab. That aircraft, identifiable by its missing wings which were never recovered, was later restored by the National Museum of the United States Air Force for display at their facility at Wright-Patterson Air Force Base, Ohio. According to the museum, part way through the excavation the site was abandoned for a night because of particularly severe heat, and upon returning the following day, the wings were gone.

==== Losses ====
The 203rd lost several servicemembers in Iraq from causes including attacks by roadside bomb and rocket propelled grenade, as well as noncombat related deaths including a HMMVW rollover.

==== Burn pits ====
Some members of the 203rd developed cancer or other illnesses following their service with the battalion in Iraq which they and their families have attributed to exposure to hazardous materials in Iraq. No conclusive link between the claims and activities specific to the 203rd has been established.

=== War in Afghanistan ===
In 2009, eight Soldiers from the 203rd deployed to Afghanistan to conduct Document and Media Exploitation attached to undisclosed units including US special operations, deployed in support of Operation Enduring Freedom.

The unit deployed to Afghanistan from 19 January 2011 to 10 November 2011 in support of the Weapons Intelligence Team mission.

=== 2009 presidential inauguration ===
On 20 January 2009, members of the 203rd marched with MIRC in the parade ceremonies of the 56th presidential inauguration before newly sworn in president Barack Obama.

== Unit awards ==
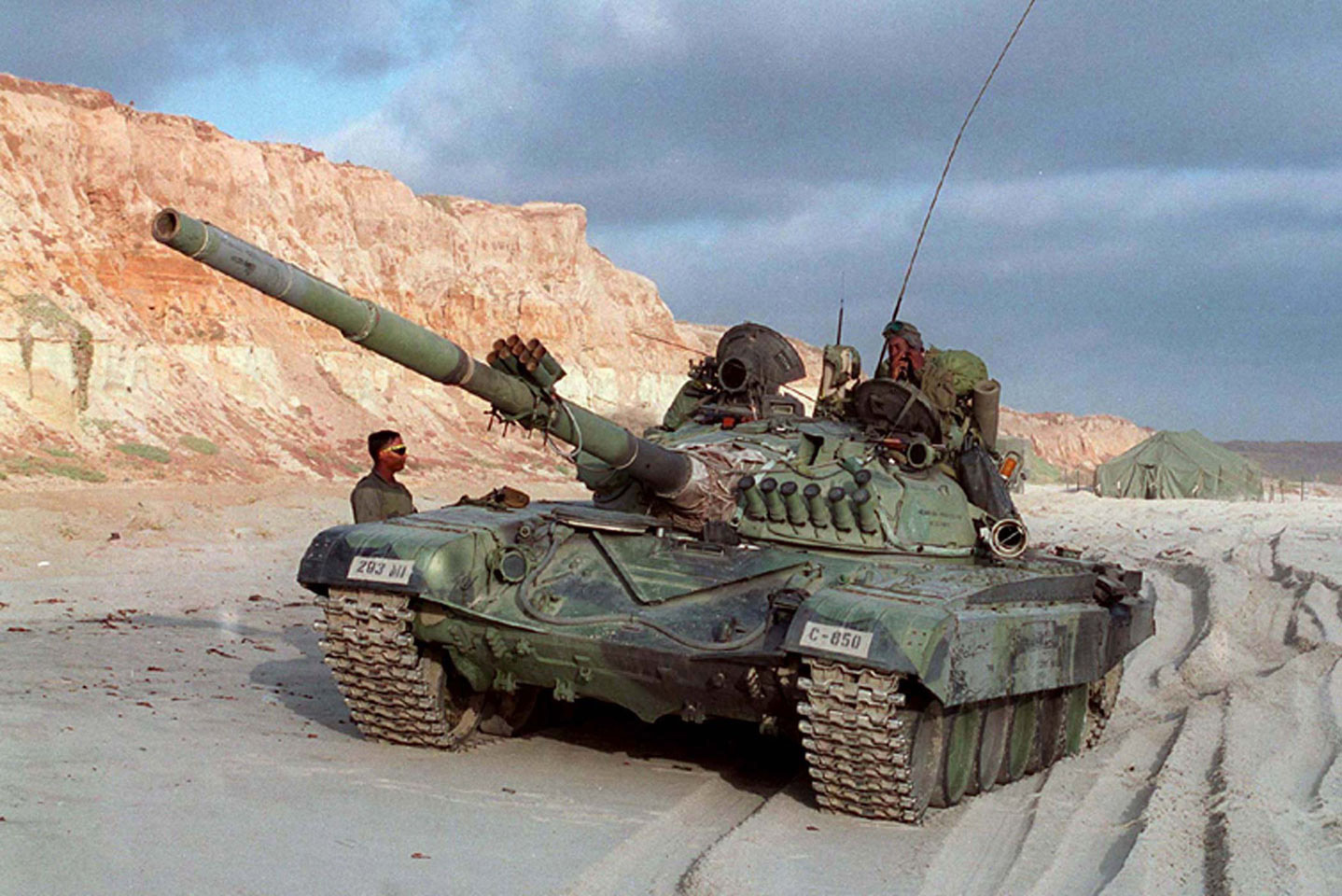
A T-72 of the 203rd during Kernel Blitz '97

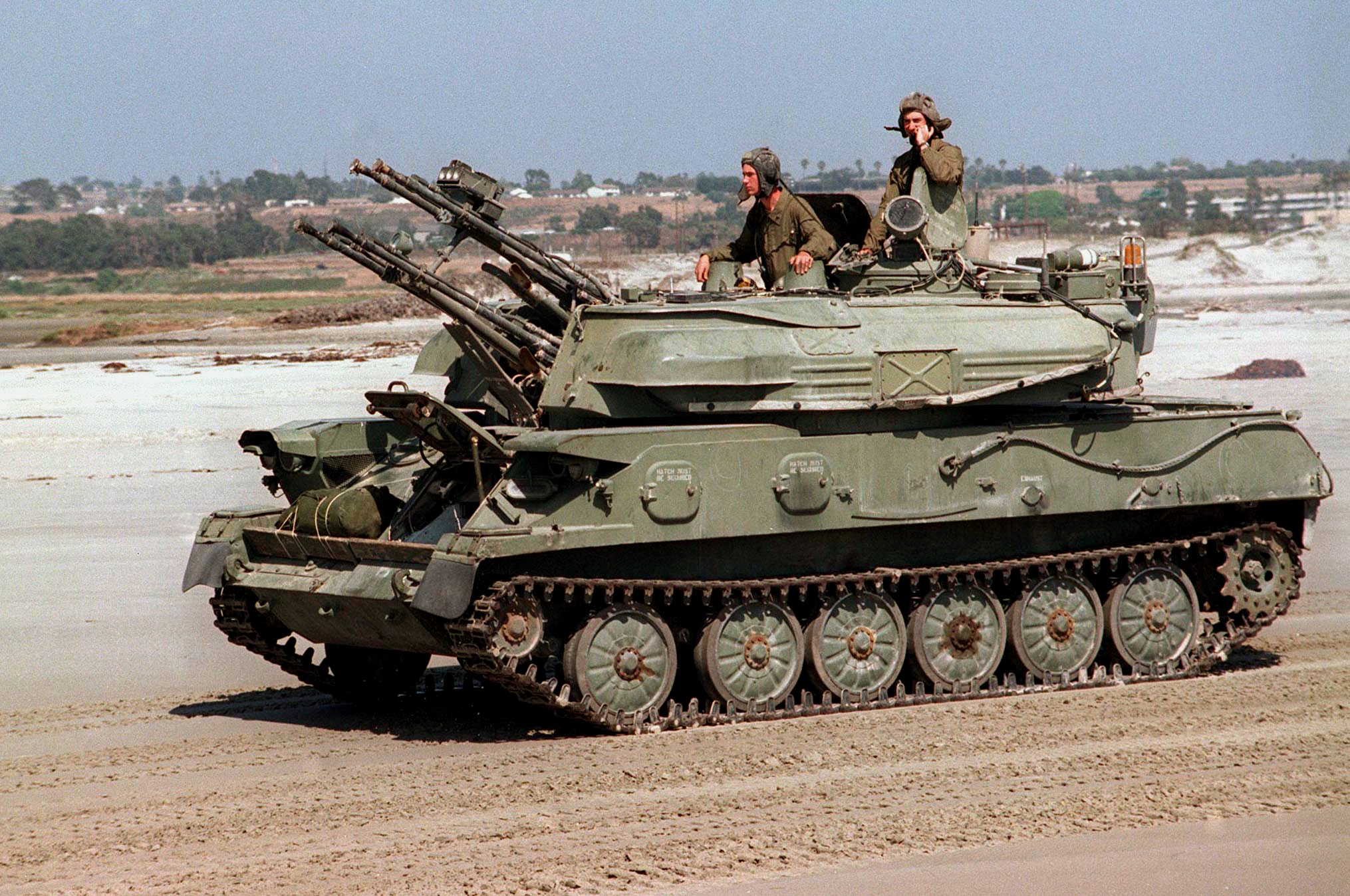
A ZSU-23-4 Shilka of the 203rd

=== Campaign streamers ===
Conflict	Streamer/award
Invasion of Grenada	Armed Forces Expeditionary Medal
Invasion of Panama	Armed Forces Expeditionary Medal
Operation Restore Hope	Armed Forces Expeditionary Medal
Operation Uphold Democracy	Armed Forces Expeditionary Medal
Operation Joint Endeavor	Armed Forces Expeditionary Medal
Operation Joint Guardian	Armed Forces Expeditionary Medal
Operation Joint Forge	Armed Forces Expeditionary Medal
Operation Desert Spring	Armed Forces Expeditionary Medal
Defense of Saudi Arabia	Southwest Asia Service Medal
Liberation of Kuwait	Southwest Asia Service Medal
Cease-Fire	Southwest Asia Service Medal
Liberation of Iraq	Iraq Campaign Medal
Transition of Iraq	Iraq Campaign Medal
Iraqi Governance	Iraq Campaign Medal
Iraqi Sovereignty	Iraq Campaign Medal
Consolidation II	Afghanistan Campaign Medal
Transition I	Afghanistan Campaign Medal
Operation Iraqi Freedom	Global War on Terrorism Service Medal
Operation Enduring Freedom	Global War on Terrorism Service Medal
Operation New Dawn	Global War on Terrorism Service Medal
Operation Inherent Resolve	Operation Inherent Resolve Campaign Medal

=== Unit citations ===
Conflict	Streamer/award	Citation
Operation Iraqi Freedom	Meritorious Unit Commendation	For service 11 August 2005 to 1 August 2006 in Baghdad, Iraq in support of Operation Iraqi Freedom.
Global War on Terror	Superior Unit Award	For service 1 October 2008 to 30 September 2009 in support of the Global War on Terror.
Operation Enduring Freedom	Meritorious Unit Commendation	For service 19 January 2011 to 10 November 2011 in support of Operation Enduring Freedom.

Charlie Company is additionally entitled to display:

Conflict	Streamer/award	Citation
Operation Iraqi Freedom	Meritorious Unit Commendation	For service 12 September 2005 to 1 September 2006 in support of Operation Iraqi Freedom.

=== Other awards ===
- Walter T. Kerwin, Jr. Readiness Award – 2022

== Insignia ==
=== Development ===
The 203rd's insignia is a slightly irregular circle, inconsistent with most US Army unit insignia. Likewise, its coat of arms reflects elements of the circular insignia placed unusually within the bare outline of a French-style escutcheon (shield). This was a result of the history of the 203rd, in which it developed its heraldic achievement in reverse order. Typically distinctive unit insignia are derived from the lower escutcheon portion of a units coat of arms. However, the 203rd evolved from a company size unit, and spent time subordinate to other groups and battalions throughout its history. Army Regulation 840-10 clarifies that company size units are not authorized a coat of arms, but may develop a distinctive unit insignia. When the 203rds insignia was approved 2 August 1982, the 203rd was a company, so it did not have a coat of arms, and thus the design did not incorporate an escutcheon derived from one. Decades later, the Army Institute of Heraldry made an effort to assign a coat of arms to battalions which were lacking, and the 203rd was designated its coat of arms 18 July 2002. However, distinctive unit insignia are permanent and unalterable, so as a result, the escutcheon portion of the coat of arms was made to incorporate the existing circular design of the distinctive unit insignia, rather than the insignia being derived from an existing escutcheon of a coat of arms, that would have given it a shield-like shape.

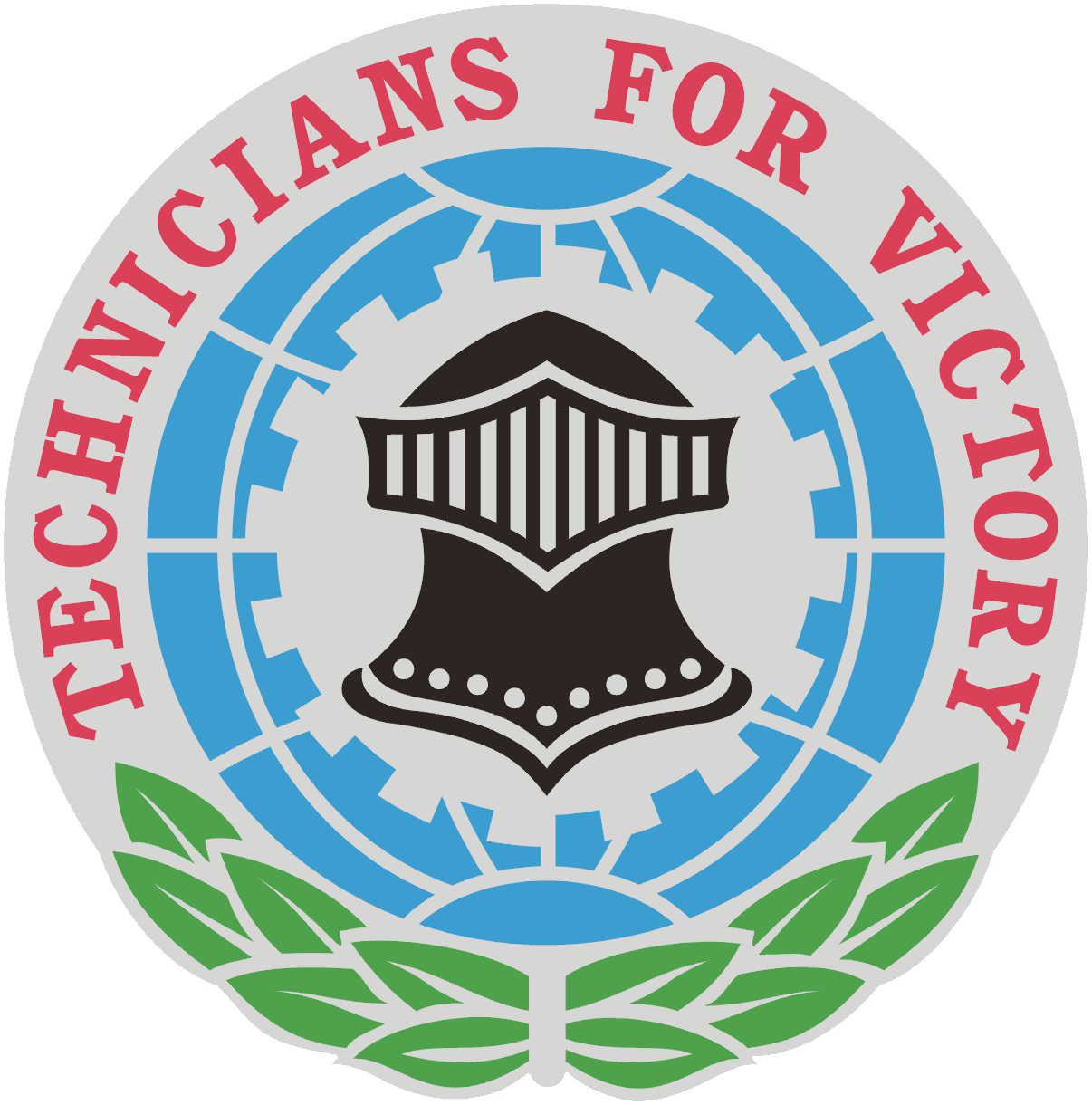
The battalion distinctive unit insignia

=== Distinctive unit insignia ===
==== Blazon ====
A silver color metal and enamel device 1 1/8 inches (2.9 cm) in height overall consisting of a silver gear bearing a black helmet with silver details, face forward, all centered upon a light blue disc with silver gridlines encircled by a silver scroll inscribed "TECHNICIANS FOR VICTORY" in red letters and in base two sprigs of green laurel.

==== Symbolism ====
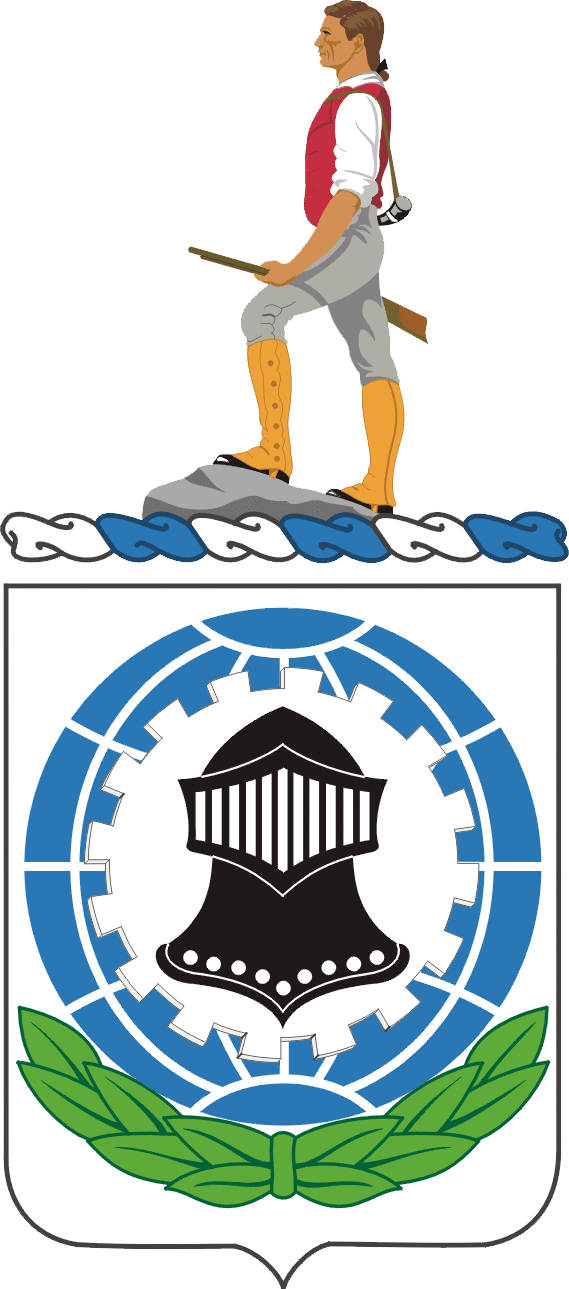
The battalion Coat of arms

Oriental blue and silver gray are the colors traditionally associated with Military Intelligence units. The gridlined sphere represents the unit's worldwide mission and the gear refers to the technical aspect of their responsibilities. The helmet has been adapted from the device of the 513th Military Intelligence Group alluding to the unit's parentage and symbolizing covert vigilance and preparedness. The laurel, a traditional symbol of achievement exemplifies the motto "Technicians for Victory."

=== Coat of arms ===
==== Blazon ====
Argent, above two sprigs of laurel Proper, a globe Celeste (Oriental Blue) gridlined and surmounted by a gear wheel of the field, thereon a close helmet affronté Sable garnished Argent. That for the regiments and separate battalions of the Army Reserve: From a wreath Argent and Celeste (Oriental Blue), the Lexington Minute Man Proper. The statue of the Minute Man, Captain John Parker (sculpted by H.H. Kitson), stands on the common in Lexington, Massachusetts.

==== Symbolism ====
Oriental blue is one of the colors traditionally associated with Military Intelligence units. The gridlined sphere represents the unit's worldwide mission and the gear refers to the technical aspect of their responsibilities. The helmet has been adapted from the device of the 513th Military Intelligence Group alluding to the unit's parentage and symbolizing covert vigilance and preparedness. The laurel, a traditional symbol of achievement, exemplifies the motto "Technicians for Victory." The crest is that of the US Army Reserve.

== List of commanders ==
Portrait	Rank and name	Assumed command	Relinquished command
Company D, 519th Military Intelligence Battalion
	MAJ Bruce Davis	1970	1972
	MAJ Ralph A. Mason	1972	1975
	LTC Delton R. Morris	1975	1978
11th Military Intelligence Company
	LTC Dwight W. Galda	June 1978	29 February 1980
11th Military Intelligence Battalion (Provisional)
	LTC James A. Bartlett	29 February 1980	12 December 1980
203rd Military Intelligence Battalion (Provisional)
	LTC John H. Prokopowicz	12 December 1980	14 March 1983
	LTC Neal E. Norman	14 March 1983	1985
Foreign Materiel Intelligence Group
	LTC Michael A. Petersen	1985	1987
Foreign Materiel Intelligence Battalion
	LTC Philip C. Marcum	1987	1989
	LTC Martin G. Kloster	1989	1991
	LTC Brian E. Fredericks	1991	1993
	LTC William G. Fillman	1993	1995
203rd Military Intelligence Battalion
	LTC Kevin R. Cunningham	August 1995	August 1997
	LTC Kevin P. McGrath	August 1997	13 July 1999
	MAJ William Randy Conlon	August 1999	September 2000
	LTC Helge Korsnes	October 2000	18 January 2002
	LTC Gary L. Brohawn	18 January 2002	11 January 2003
	LTC James V. Young Jr.	3 February 2003	21 January 2005
	LTC Alan Ott	2005	2006
	LTC Avery Penn	February 2007	11 July 2009
	LTC Troy V. Heskett	11 July 2009	June 2011
	LTC Irene M. Zoppi	June 2011	29 January 2012
	LTC Jeffery Risner	29 January 2012	July 2014
	LTC David Ott	July 2014	2016
	LTC Clifford Ryan Gunst	2016	21 July 2017
	MAJ Jason R. Constable	21 July 2017	5 May 2018
	LTC Sean W. Hoover	5 May 2018	2020
	Unknown	2020	c. 2022
	LTC Juan Pace	c. 2022	12 September 2024
	LTC Michael Mendoza	12 September 2024	Incumbent

== Notable members ==
- Thomas J. Hennen, astronaut
- Irene M. Zoppi, first Puerto Rican Army Reserve General Officer
- James V. Young Jr., Chief of Staff of the United States Army Reserve

== Notable equipment ==
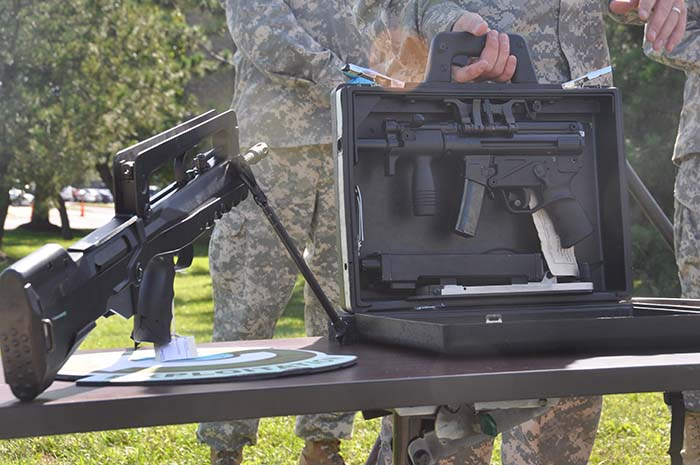
Members of the unit displaying their HK MP5K Operational Briefcase, recovered from Saddam's palace by 7th infantry. At left, a French military FAMAS G2.

China

- Type 69

France

- Panhard AML-90
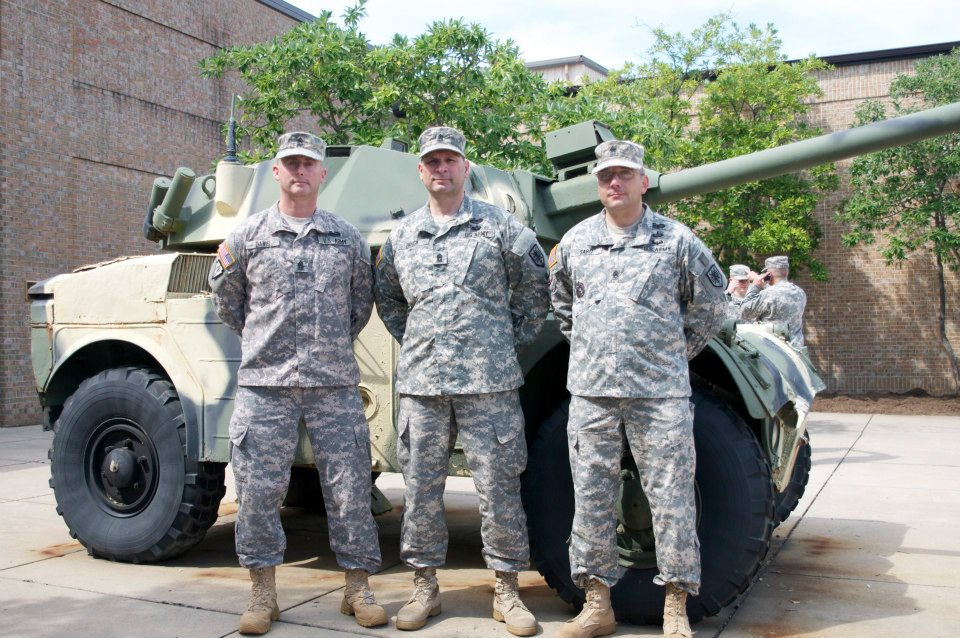
  Members of the 203rd in front of the battalion's Panhard AML-90

Germany

- Heckler & Koch MP5K Operational Briefcase

Soviet Union

- 2K22 Tunguska
- 2S3 Akatsiya
- BM-21 Grad 9P138
- BMD-1, 2 and 3
- BMP-2
- BRDM-2
- BTR-50, 60, 70, and 80
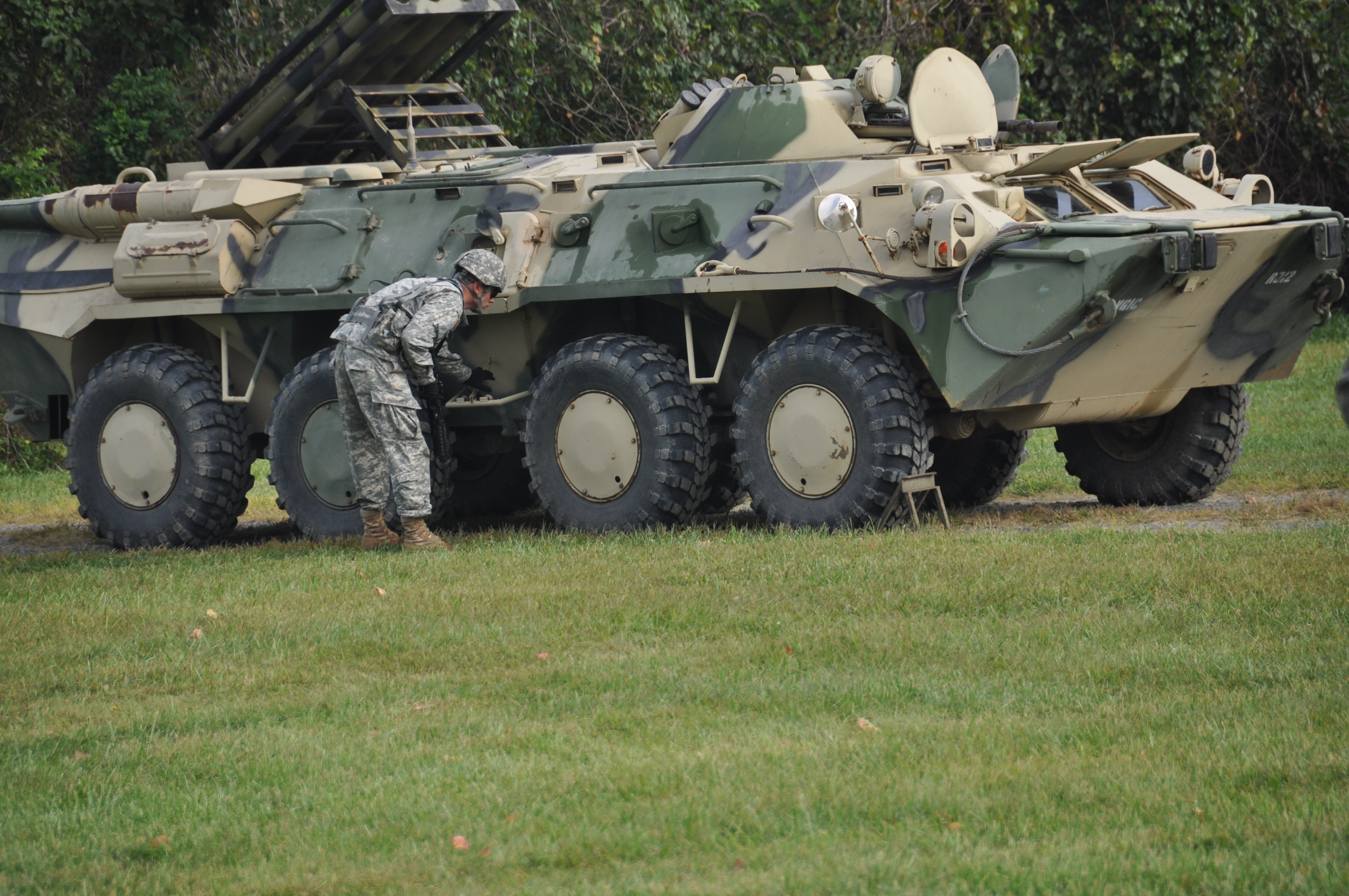
  Personnel from the battalion examine a BTR-80
- D-20
- Mil Mi-2
- MT-55
- MT-LBu
- T-34/85 (x2)
- T-54
- T-54A (captured during Desert Storm)
- T-55
- T-55 Enigma (Iraqi-designed explosive reactive armor kit)
- T-62
- T-64 (hull only)
- T-72
- T-72BA
- T-80U, obtained from the United Kingdom

Ukraine

- T-80UD Bereza, obtained from Ukraine in 2003

Yugoslavia

- BVP M-80

=== National Museum of American History ===
machinegun
- Type: 7.62mm machine gun
- Material: Metal, wood, plastic
- Length: 45 3/4 inches (116 cm)
- Place: National Museum of American History
- Present location: Currently not on view
- Identification: 1986.0247.02

An unspecified 7.62mm machine gun from the 203rd has been donated to the Smithsonian Institution and is housed in the non-display archives of the National Museum of American History.

== See also ==
- 492nd Special Operations Wing
- Missile and Space Intelligence Center
- National Air and Space Intelligence Center
- National Center for Medical Intelligence
- National Ground Intelligence Center
- Farragut Technical Analysis Center

== Publications ==
- PKM Machine gun operators manual produced by the 203rd
- T-62 Tank operators manual produced by the 203rd
