= 221st Intelligence and Electronic Warfare Battalion =

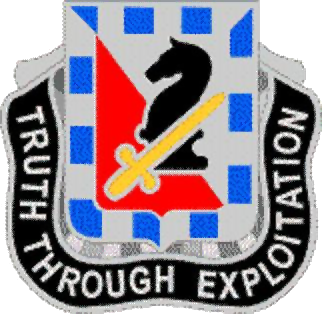
- Battalion emblem
- Active: October 2007 – present
- Country: United States
- Branch: United States Army; National Guard
- Type: Military Intelligence
- Size: Battalion
- Part of: Georgia Army National Guard
- Headquarters: Fort Gillem, Forest Park, Georgia
- Colors: Oriental Blue Silver Gray
- Engagements: Yugoslav Wars: Kosovo War; Global War on Terrorism: War in Afghanistan; Iraq War
- Website: Official Facebook page

Commanders
- Current commander: LTC Brett Duke

The 221st Intelligence and Electronic Warfare Battalion, based at Fort Gillem in Forest Park, Georgia, is a battalion of the Georgia Army National Guard.

== Overview ==
The 221st Military Intelligence (MI) Battalion collects intelligence information in multiple intelligence disciplines to provide unit commanders intelligence for the battlefield and the focus of combat power. The organization also conducts intelligence production activities, ranging from intelligence preparation of the battlefield to situation development, signals intelligence, human intelligence, and counterintelligence support to Maneuver Commanders. The unit also has significant responsibilities in counterintelligence, human intelligence, force protection, and electronic warfare.

The battalion's vision includes: (1) collecting and providing relevant intelligence, security and information operations for U.S. Army, joint and combined forces; (2) leveraging national/theater/tactical equipment and capabilities of assigned personnel to provide relevant information reports to commanders at all echelons; (3) exploiting leading edge technology; and (4) meeting the challenge of today, tomorrow and the 21st Century.

A new 111th Electromagnetic Warfare Company traces its history to the former GA Guard 111th Signal Battalion.

== Battalion Distinctive Unit Insignia ==
Distinctive Unit Insignia

=== Description ===
A silver color metal and enamel device 1 1/8 inches (2.9 cm) in height overall consisting of a shield blazoned: Per bend Argent and Gules a chess knight Sable surmounted by a sword bendwise sinister hilt to base Or; a bordure compony Azure (Oriental Blue) and Argent. Attached below the shield is a black and silver scroll inscribed "TRUTH THROUGH EXPLOITATION" in silver.

=== Symbolism ===
The colors oriental blue and silver gray represent the Military Intelligence Corps. The chess knight refers to the mission, which involves foresight and skillful planning. Its form, that of a horse, recalls the historic connection of Army Intelligence to Cavalry, which was the first organization to provide military intelligence services to the commander. The border alludes again to the chess-like strategic capabilities often important to the mission. The scarlet of the field recalls the flag of the battalion's home state, Georgia, and denotes courage. The sword indicates readiness and the will to fight. Together, scarlet, white and blue represent the United States. Black and gold signify respectively strength and excellence.

=== Background ===
The distinctive unit insignia was approved on 13 Apr 1999.

== Commanders ==
Years	Name
2000–2001	LTC Iler
2001–2002	LTC Maria Britt
2002–2004	LTC Bierschmitt
2004–2005	MAJ Peter VanAmburgh
2005–2007	LTC John Rudio
2007–2008	MAJ Matt Saxton
2008–2009	LTC Mark Elam
2009–2012	LTC Raquel Durden
2012–2013	LTC Theodore R. Scott III
2014–2015	LTC Anthony B. Poole
2015–2017	LTC Patrick Watson
2017–2019	LTC John Fuchko
2019–2021	LTC Christopher Burton
2021–Present	LTC Brett Duke

== Missions ==
The 221st MI BN has been involved in a number of missions since its inception.

=== Iraq (Operation Iraqi Freedom) ===
In early May 2003, H Company (Long Range Surveillance) of the 221st provided 54 LRS infantrymen to the 203rd Military Intelligence Battalion (TECHINT) in support of foreign materials exploitation and WMD recovery missions. They accompanied almost every Joint Captured Material Exploitation Center collection mission providing security. On June 25, 2003, several LRS soldiers from the 221st were the first casualties of the technical intelligence mission in Iraq when they suffered non-life-threatening injuries from a roadside IED attack on the 203rd. The 221st MI Battalion also have deployed to Iraq in 2005 and 2007.

=== KFOR 13 ===
In April 2010, 221st MI BN mobilized and deployed 32 Soldiers as the KFOR 13 Analytical Control Element (ACE) in support of Multinational Division – East located at Camp Bondsteel.

=== KFOR 14 ===
In December 2010, 221st MI BN mobilized and deployed 32 Soldiers as the KFOR 14 Analytical Control Element (ACE) in support of Multinational Division – East located at Camp Bondsteel.

=== KFOR 15 ===
In August 2011, 221st MI BN mobilized and deployed Soldiers as the KFOR 15 Analytical Control Element (ACE) for a year-long deployment in support of Multinational Division – East located at Camp Bondsteel.

=== Afghanistan (Operation Enduring Freedom) ===
In January 2012, 221st MI BN mobilized and deployed the Black Knight OEF Task Force overseas to provide signal intelligence and human intelligence gathering capabilities to allied ground commanders in Afghanistan.

=== COVID-19 Response Force ===
The 221st Military Intelligence Battalion, along with other units of the Georgia Army National Guard, provided aid in response to the COVID-19 pandemic.

== Subordinate Units ==
=== Alpha Company ===
Represents the Georgia National Guard's counter-intelligence agents, interrogators and linguists. Alpha Company was among the first Georgia Army National Guard units to deploy in February 2003 as part of Operation Iraqi Freedom.

=== Bravo Company ===
Represents the Georgia National Guard's counter-intelligence agents, interrogators and linguists. Bravo Company was among the first Georgia Army National Guard units to deploy in February 2003 as part of Operation Iraqi Freedom.

=== Charlie Company ===
Represents the Georgia National Guard's counter-intelligence agents, interrogators and linguists. Charlie Company was among the first Georgia Army National Guard units to deploy in February 2003 as part of Operation Iraqi Freedom.
