= Irene M. Zoppi =

Brigadier General, United States Army Reservist

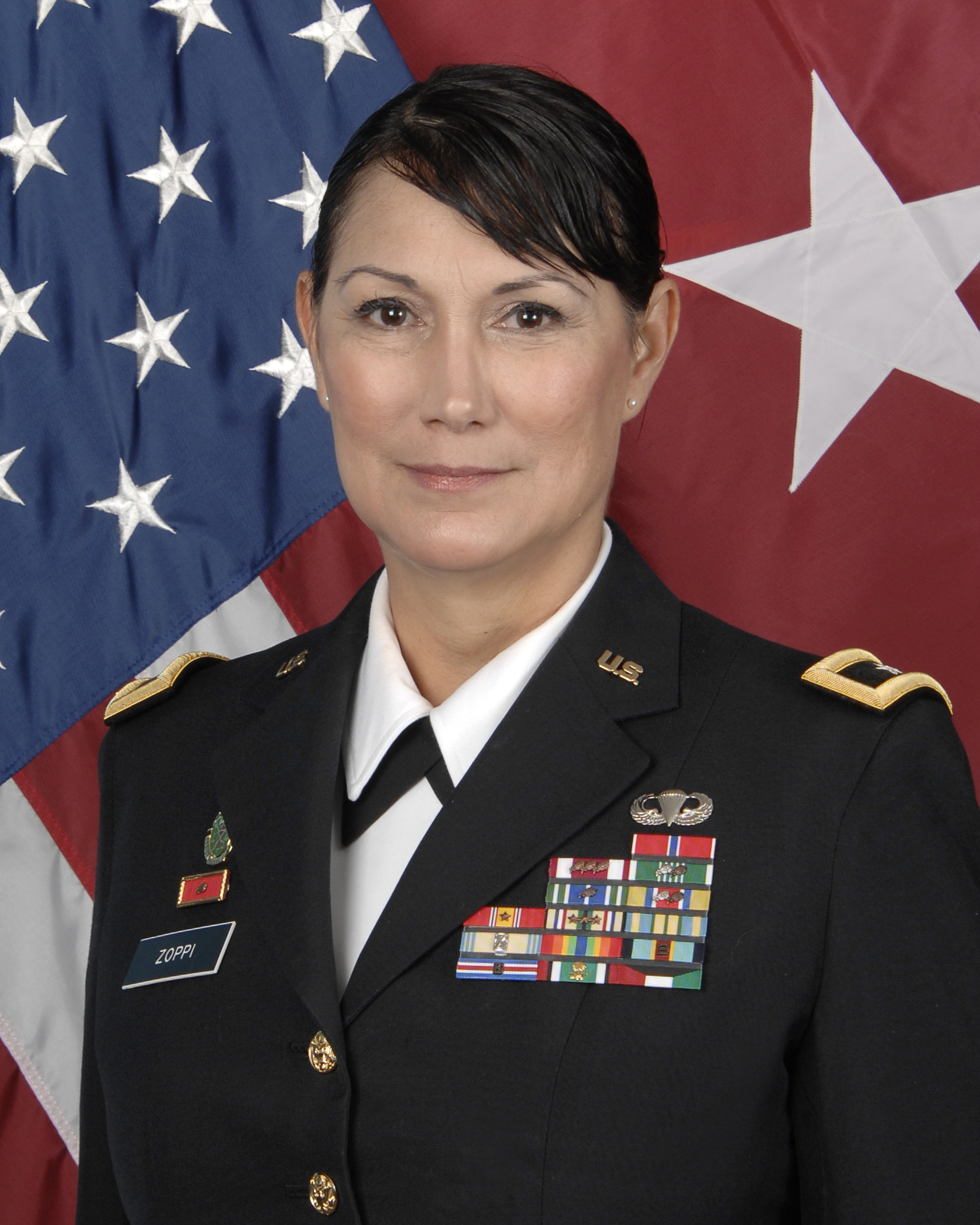
- Zoppi in 2017
- Born: Irene Miller Rodríguez; August 22, 1966 (age 60); Canóvanas, Puerto Rico
- Military career
- Allegiance: United States of America
- Branch: United States Army
- Service years: 1985–1995 (Active); 1995–2020 (Reserve)
- Rank: Brigadier General
- Nickname: "Ramba"
- Unit: 3rd Armored Division-Spearhead
- Commands: DCG/Director, AREC - U.S. Army South, Ft Sam, San Antonio, TX and Former Deputy Commanding General – Support under the 200th Military Police Command at Fort Meade, Maryland.
- Conflicts: Operation Desert Storm
- Awards: Bronze Star Medal; Meritorious Service Medal (with 3 oak leaf clusters); Army Commendation Medal (with 6 oak leaf clusters)
- Other work: Program Director for the National Intelligence University at the National Security Agency.

Irene M. Zoppi Rodríguez (née Miller Rodríguez; born August 22, 1966), is a retired U.S. Army Reserve brigadier general and academic. She was the first Puerto Rican woman ever to attain that rank in the Army Reserve. Her final assignment was deputy commanding general for United States Army South as the director of the Army Reserve Engagement Cell for Individual Mobilization Augmentees. Zoppi is an adjunct professor at Strayer University. She has worked as an instructor for the National Intelligence University where she directed the university's academic center within the National Security Agency.

== Early life and education ==
Zoppi was born and raised in the town of Canóvanas, Puerto Rico. Her grandmother and aunts encouraged her to pursue a career. When she was in eighth grade, Zoppi's grandfather pushed her to pursue an education. She attended the University of Puerto Rico, joined the university's ROTC program and began her training in 1985 at the University of Puerto Rico at Humacao campus. Zoppi continued her training in the Río Piedras Campus upon her transfer there.

Zoppi completed a B.A. in Modern Languages from the University of Puerto Rico in 1988, after learning to speak five languages, Spanish, English, Italian, French and German. She was commissioned as a second lieutenant in the United States Army.

She earned a Master of Business Administration (MBA) from Johns Hopkins University in 2000. That same year she earned her Ph.D. in Education Policy, Planning, and Administration from the University of Maryland. In 2012, Zoppi earned a Master of Strategic Studies degree from the Army War College and in 2011 the Homeland Security Planners Course at the Joint Forces Staff College.

== Military career ==
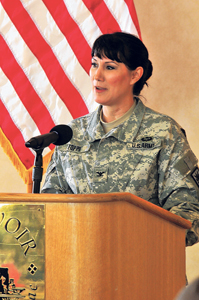
Zoppi at a women's observance event in 2012

Zoppi began as private first class in the United States Army Reserve and was assigned to the Military Police Corps at Fort McClellan in Alabama with the following assignments at the 301st Military Police Battalion, Bayamon, PR; and 390th Transportation Battalion, Naval Station Roosevelt Roads, Ceiba, PR. Her nickname "Ramba", an allusion to the movie character Rambo, comes from. She was sent overseas to Germany before being deployed to the Middle East during the Persian Gulf War as part of Operation Desert Storm. She served with the 3rd Armored Division-Spearhead at Frankfurt, Germany as a special security officer and worked with the telecommunication centers. Among her duties as a special security officer was obtaining classified information from the internet, interpreting the information, labeling it, and making it available to her superiors. She was stationed in the area known as "The Valley of Death" where the oil fields were burning. This was one of the areas where the Iraqis were trying to flee Kuwait. She described the experience as one of the culture shocks which she was subjected to. Prior culture shocks in her life included the culture of United States and that of Europe (specifically, Germany). Zoppi was present during the liberation of Kuwait and was awarded the Bronze Star Medal. She also served in Iraq and Saudi Arabia during her deployment. Zoppi left the active component of the U.S. Army in 1995 as a captain and entered the U.S. Army Reserve.

While serving in the reserves, Zoppi was promoted to major and later to lieutenant colonel. She served as the Battalion Commander for 11th Battalion, 3rd Brigade, 104th Division (Leadership Development) at Fort Lewis Washington. She then became the Assistant J2/Chief Intelligence Officer for the National Capital Region Joint Task Force under United States Northern Command. Afterwards, she was the Battalion Commander of the 203rd Military Intelligence Battalion (Technical Intelligence), followed by promotion to colonel and assignment as the Group Commander for the 3100th Strategic Intelligence Group at Fort Belvoir Virginia. By 2015, she was serving as the Deputy Commander and Chief of Staff of 1st Mission Support Command, Fort Buchanan, Puerto Rico. She was one of fifteen Latina colonels in the army reserves. Zoppi then served as the Army Reserve Element Commander and J2 of the 76th Operational Response Command with United States Southern Command.

In September 2017, Zoppi was promoted to the rank of Brigadier General. Her promotion came with the appointment as deputy commanding general for the 200th Military Police Command. She is the first Puerto Rican woman promoted to the rank of general in the U.S. Army Reserve. In 2019, Zoppi was named director of the Army Reserve Engagement Cell and a deputy commanding general for United States Army South. In that capacity, she visited Honduras in May to observe reserve medical training there.

== Academic career ==
As a civilian Zoppi has taught in the public school system of Maryland and also at various universities. She is a former adjunct professor, College of Notre Dame, and former Research Associate at the Maryland Institute of Minority Achievement and Urban Education, University of Maryland. As a professor in the Business and Education Departments at Strayer University, she was named 2012 Strayer University Faculty of the Year, and was a keynote speaker at the 2013 Latina Style Business Series conference, where she advocated for women to incorporate Latin American culture into their business models and cited the importance of community in Latina culture as an asset for companies. She has worked as an instructor for the National Intelligence University and director of the university's academic center within the National Security Agency.

She was appointed to the Maryland State Board of Education for a four-year term from 2017 to 2021. In 2020, she was appointed as the first Hispanic trustee of Anne Arundel Community College.

=== Accolades ===
- 2009 – Listed as one of "Maryland's Top 100 Women" by the Daily Record
- 2012 – Strayer University Faculty of the Year Award
- 2013 – Knowlton Award of the Military Intelligence Corps Association
- 2015 – Latina of Influence Award by the Hispanic Lifestyle Magazine
- Kentucky Colonel, Honorable Order of Kentucky Colonels.
- 2019 - Inducted to the Puerto Rico Veterans Hall of Fame.

== Personal life ==
In 1988 Zoppi married Thomas Zoppi, a United States Marine Corps veteran, now serves as a Law Enforcement Officer at, County Police. They have three children and two grandchildren.

== Military awards and decorations ==
Among Zoppi's military awards and decorations are the following:

=== Military awards ===
Parachutist badge
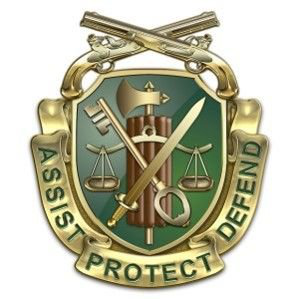
Regimental Insignia
3rd Armored Division Combat Service Identification Badge

Bronze Star Medal
Meritorious Service Medal (with 3 Oak leaf clusters)
Army Commendation Medal (with 6 Oak leaf clusters)
Army Achievement Medal (with 1 Oak leaf clusters)
Army Reserve Components Achievement Medal (with 6 Oak leaf clusters)
Army Meritorious Unit Commendation (with 1 Oak leaf cluster)
Army Presidential Unit Citation
National Defense Service Medal (with one Service star)
Southwest Asia Service Medal (with three Service stars)
Military Outstanding Volunteer Service Medal
Armed Forces Reserve Medal (with Silver Hourglass)
Army Service Ribbon
Army Overseas Service Ribbon (with award numeral 2)
Army Reserve Components Overseas Training Ribbon (with award numeral 2)
Kuwait Liberation Medal (Saudi Arabia)
Kuwait Liberation Medal (Kuwait)

== See also ==
- Military history of Puerto Rico
- List of Puerto Rican military personnel
- Puerto Rican women in the military
- History of women in Puerto Rico
