= 297th Military Intelligence Battalion (United States) =

- Distinctive Unit Insignia
- Active: 1962–1968; 1990–present
- Country: United States
- Branch: United States Army
- Part of: 513th Military Intelligence Brigade
- Garrison/HQ: Fort Gordon, Georgia
- Nickname(s): "INSCOM's Contingency Force"
- Motto(s): Always Forward, Yield to None

Insignia
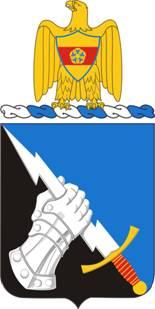
- Coat of arms

Known as "INSCOM's Contingency Force", the 297th Military Intelligence Battalion (297th MI BN) is a battalion subordinate to the 513th Military Intelligence Brigade, located at Fort Gordon, Georgia. Its mission is to provide operational, all source intelligence to the Commander, U.S. Army Central Command (CENTCOM). Battalion intelligence operations include all source analysis, collection management, battlefield damage assessment, imagery (national and theater) exploitation and dissemination. The battalion sustains itself and the Brigade Headquarters by providing food service, maintenance, military police and communications support.

The 297th MI BN provides tailored, multi-disciplined intelligence teams and capabilities in support of USCENTCOM, USARCENT, and regionally-aligned/Globally-responsive forces to defeat adversaries, promote regional stability, support partner nations and allies, and protect U.S. interests.

== Lineage and honors ==
- Constituted 21 November 1962 in the Army Reserve as the 297th Army Security Agency Company.
- Activated 1 March 1963 at Atlanta, Georgia.
- Reorganized and redesignated 15 April 1966 as Headquarters and Headquarters Company, 197th Army Security Agency Battalion.
- Inactivated 31 January 1968 at Atlanta, Georgia.
- Redesignated 1 February 1990 as Headquarters and Headquarters Company, 297th Military Intelligence Battalion; concurrently withdrawn from the Army Reserve and allotted to the Regular Army.
- Redesignated 17 October 1991 as Headquarters, Headquarters and Service Company, 297th Military Intelligence Battalion, and activated at Fort Monmouth, New Jersey (organic elements concurrently constituted and activated).

== History ==
The 297th Military Intelligence Battalion was originally constituted in the United States Army Reserves as the 297th Army Security Agency Company on 21 November 1962 and assigned to the Third United States Army. It was activated on 1 March 1963 in Atlanta, Georgia. The unit was reorganized and redesignated as the Headquarters and Headquarters Company, 297th Security Agency Battalion on 15 April 1966. It was inactivated on 31 January 1968 and relieved from assignment to the Third United States Army. On 1 February 1990 the unit was redesignated as Headquarters and Headquarters Company, 297th Military Intelligence Battalion and concurrently removed from the Army Reserve and allotted to the Regular Army. The unit was redesignated as Headquarters and Headquarters Service Company, 297th Military Intelligence Battalion on 1 February 1990 and was activated at Fort Monmouth, New Jersey. During June and July 1994, the elements at Fort Monmouth moved to Fort Gordon, Georgia.

The battalion was subordinate to the 513th Military Intelligence Brigade, a force projection brigade. The battalion was composed of the Headquarters and Headquarters Service Company, A Company and C Company, all located at Fort Gordon, and elements of B Company, were collocated with the Joint Surveillance and Target Attack Radar System (JSTARS) at Robins Air Force Base, Georgia and US Central Command (USCENTCOM) at MacDill AFB, Florida. The Intelligence Support Element-McPherson (ISE-M), was collocated with the U.S. Army Central Command (ARCENT) at Fort McPherson, Georgia. There were two Corps Military Intelligence Support Elements (CMISE), one at Fort Hood, Texas with the III Corps and one at Fort Bragg, North Carolina, with the XVIII Airborne Corps. Their mission was to enhance INSCOM's support to the warfighting corps commanders. The Army's JSTARS detachment was also part of the battalion. It provided Army crewmembers to JSTARS and was located at Robins Air Force Base, Georgia.

In 1999 while located at MacDill, Air Force Base, B Company became officially recognized as C Company. C Company, located at Fort Gordon, became officially recognized as B Company. In October 2004, the CMISE mission in support of III U.S. Corps became integrated in Fort Gordon operations, reducing the Battalion's number of remote CMISE to one. Also, JSTARS was redesignated the 138th MI Company and was subordinated to INSCOM HQ.

The Vanguard Battalion's mission is to provide operational, all source intelligence to the Commander, U.S. Army Central Command. Battalion intelligence operations include all source analysis, collection management, battlefield damage assessment, imagery (national and theater) exploitation and dissemination. The battalion sustains itself and the Brigade Headquarters by providing food service, maintenance, military police and communications support.

The colors of the 297th MI BN.

== Coat of arms ==
=== Description ===
Per bend azure and sable, in dexter base a gauntlet argent grasping a lightning flash sword bendwise blade of the like, grip gules, pommel and quillon or.

=== Symbolism ===
The colors oriental blue and silver gray are traditionally associated with military intelligence. The armored fist represents strength; the lightning flash denotes speed. The fist seizes the blade of the sword to indicate readiness and vigilance. Black denotes dependability and suggests covert capabilities. The fist, upraised and grasping the sword, suggests leadership, highlighting the unit's motto.

== Motto ==
The motto of the 297th Military Intelligence Battalion is "Always Forward, Yield to None", signifying the rapid deployment of the battalion and its ability to perform its mission anywhere in the world.
