= 513th Military Intelligence Brigade =

- 513th Military Intelligence Brigade shoulder sleeve insignia
- Active: 1986–present
- Country: United States
- Branch: United States Army
- Part of: United States Army Intelligence and Security Command
- Motto: INSCOM's Contingency Force

Commanders
- Current commander: COL Sapriya Mclendon

Insignia
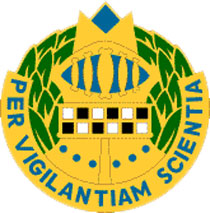
- 513th Military Intelligence Brigade distinctive unit insignia

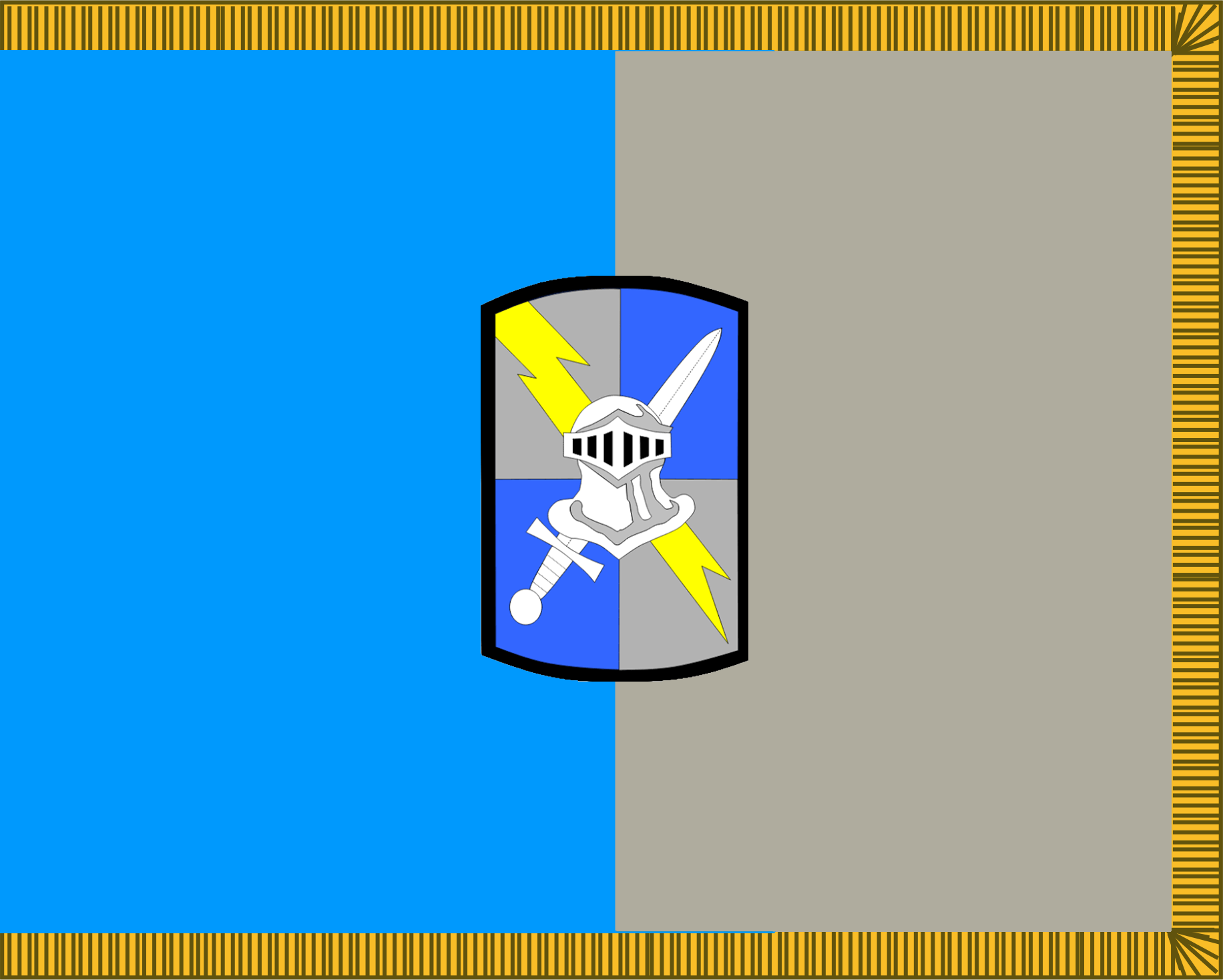
- 513th Military Intelligence Brigade Flag

The 513th Military Intelligence Brigade is a unit of the United States Army and subordinate to the U.S. Army Intelligence and Security Command. Its mission is to provide "tailored, multi-disciplined intelligence and intelligence capabilities in support of ARCENT and other Commands, to defeat adversaries, promote regional stability, support partners and allies, and protect US interests." The 513th is headquartered at Fort Gordon, Georgia.

== History ==
The 513th MI Group performed its mission of intelligence collection and counterespionage in support of United States Army Europe until its inactivation in 1969. The Group reactivated at Fort Monmouth, New Jersey in 1982, spinning off the 201st and 203rd MI Battalions, and assuming its current mission of providing intelligence support to United States Third Army (ARCENT) and United States Central Command (CENTCOM). The Group re-designated as the 513th Military Intelligence Brigade in 1986. Elements of the Brigade including the 138th Aviation Company (EW), a US Army Reserve unit flying the Cefirm Leader System of RU-21A aircraft, deployed in support of Operations DESERT SHIELD and DESERT STORM, winning three Southwest Asian Service battle streamers.

The 513th Military Intelligence Brigade relocated to Fort Gordon, Georgia in 1994. In 1997, the Brigade assumed the additional mission of intelligence support to United States Army South (USARSO). The 513th Military Intelligence Brigade deployed forces in support of Operation DESERT FOX in 1998.

=== Global War on Terrorism ===
In 2001, immediately following 9/11, the Vigilant Knights deployed Soldiers to Afghanistan and numerous other locations in the AOR in support of Operation ENDURING FREEDOM (OEF) and again deployed the vast majority of the Brigade’s Soldiers to the AOR in support of Operation IRAQI FREEDOM (OIF) in 2002 and 2003. From 2003 to 2005, the Brigade deployed the 202nd and 297th Military Intelligence Battalions to Iraq in support of OIF. From December 2006 to 2008 the Brigade deployed two Task Forces in support of OEF, Task Force Lightning and Task Force Deuce.

From October 2009 until March 2010 the 202nd Military Intelligence Battalion deployed Task Force Deuce II in support of CJTF-82 in Afghanistan. Also in October 2009 the 202nd Military Intelligence Battalion deployed forces in support of CJSOTF-A until October 2010. Starting in 2008 until 2010, the 224th Military Intelligence Battalion (AE) started recurring deployments in support of operations for MNC-I. From Iraq the 224th Military Intelligence Battalion (AE) moved to deployments in Afghanistan in support of ISAF.

From September 2009 to December 2011, the Brigade deployed personnel in support of the Aerial Precision Geolocation office in both Iraq and Afghanistan. Starting in 2010, the 202nd Military Intelligence Battalion took on a recurring mission to support Operations within Special Operations Command (SOCOM) in the Afghanistan Theater. In January 2011 the Brigade deployed Soldiers of the 297th Military Intelligence Battalion and the 202nd Military Intelligence Battalion in support of the Strategic Debriefing Center in Afghanistan until January 2012. In August 2011 the 202nd Military Intelligence Battalion again deployed Soldiers in support of Combined Joint Special Operations Task Force-Afghanistan.

== Subordinate Units ==
The 513th Military Intelligence Brigade has several subordinate units.

Headquarters and Headquarters Company
The Headquarters and Headquarters Company (HHC) provides command and control of the brigade and subordinate units, as well as logistical and administrative support for the brigade staff.

202nd Military Intelligence Battalion
The 202nd Military Intelligence Battalion conducts continuous overt human intelligence collection in CONUS and human intelligence collection and counterintelligence in support of U.S. Army Central and U.S. Central Command full spectrum operations to defeat adversaries, promote regional stability, support allies and protect U.S. national interests in the U.S. Central Command Area of Responsibility; the battalion supports other commands as directed. The 202nd Military Intelligence Battalion is located at Fort Gordon, GA.

297th Military Intelligence Battalion
The stated mission of 297th Military Intelligence Battalion is to provide "tailored, multi-disciplined intelligence teams and capabilities in support of ARCENT and CENTCOM to defeat adversaries, promote regional stability, support partner nations and allies, and protect US interests." The 297th Military Intelligence Battalion is located at Fort Gordon, GA.

345th Military Intelligence Battalion
The 345th Military Intelligence Battalion is scheduled to mobilize and deploy to the assigned area of responsibility to conduct multi-discipline intelligence operations in support of the 513th Military Intelligence Brigade to defeat adversaries, promote regional stability, support allies and protect U.S. national interests. The 345th is a US Army Reserve unit stationed at Fort Gordon, GA.

== See also ==
- 201st Battlefield Surveillance Brigade
- 525th Battlefield Surveillance Brigade
- 704th Military Intelligence Brigade
- Battlefield Surveillance Brigade, The United States Army is currently reorganizing its intelligence formations into Battlefield Surveillance Brigades (BfSB).

== External links and Sources ==
- US Army Intelligence and Security Command
