= National Ground Intelligence Center =

US Army unit

Coordinates: 38.156°N 78.415°W

National Ground Intelligence Center — NGIC —
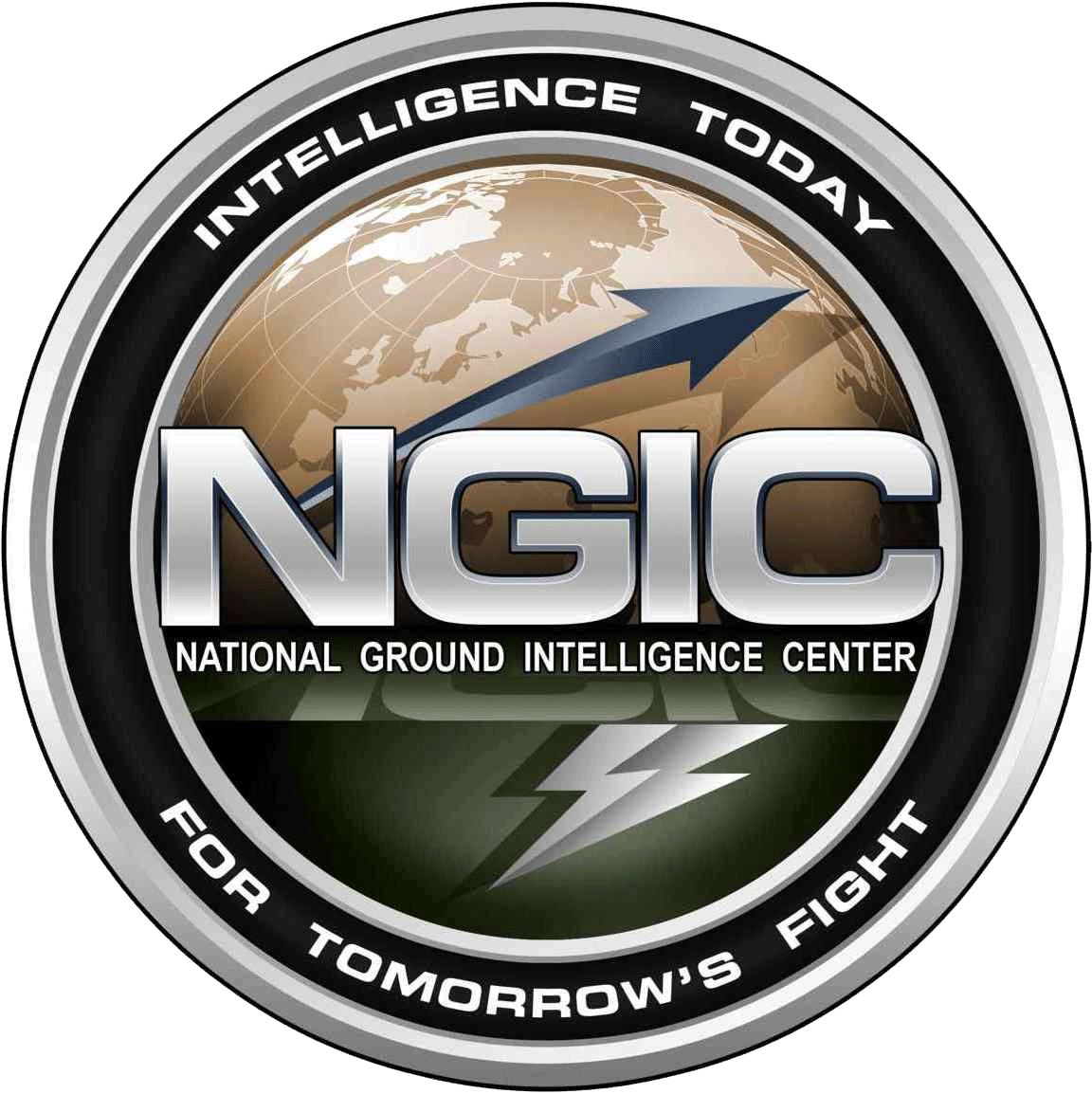
- Seal of the center

Agency overview
- Formed: 8 July 1994
- Headquarters: Nicholson Building, Rivanna Station, Charlottesville, VA
- Motto: Intelligence Today for Tomorrow's Fight
- Employees: Classified
- Annual budget: Classified
- Agency executive: COL Christopher C. Rankin
- Parent agency: United States Army Intelligence and Security Command
- Website: Official site

The National Ground Intelligence Center (NGIC) is part of the United States Army Intelligence and Security Command. The NGIC provides scientific and technical intelligence (S&T) and general military intelligence (GMI) on foreign ground forces in support of the warfighting commanders, force and material developers, Department of the Army, Department of Defense, and National-level decisionmakers. The NGIC also manages the Army's Foreign Materiel Exploitation Program and foreign material acquisition requirements, and constitutes a single authoritative source for comprehensive ground forces threats to the Army and other services. (Chapter 8, Army Field Manual 34–37, Preliminary Draft)

The center is located in northern Albemarle County, Virginia, just north of Charlottesville. It is approximately 100 miles (160 km) southwest of Washington, D.C., and 85 miles (137 km) west of Richmond, Virginia. It also maintains a test and evaluation facility at Aberdeen Proving Ground, Maryland, co-located with the Army's technical intelligence unit, the 203rd Military Intelligence Battalion.

NGIC was created on 8 July 1994, by merging the US Army Foreign Science and Technology Center (FSTC) and the US Army Intelligence and Threat Analysis Center (ITAC). The former headquarters of FSTC in Charlottesville, Virginia, became the headquarters of the new Center. (INSCOM Permanent Order 41-1, 3 June 1994)

The Air Force counterpart to NGIC is the National Air and Space Intelligence Center, located at Wright-Patterson AFB, Ohio.
