= Document Exploitation =

U.S. military procedures to use documents seized in combat

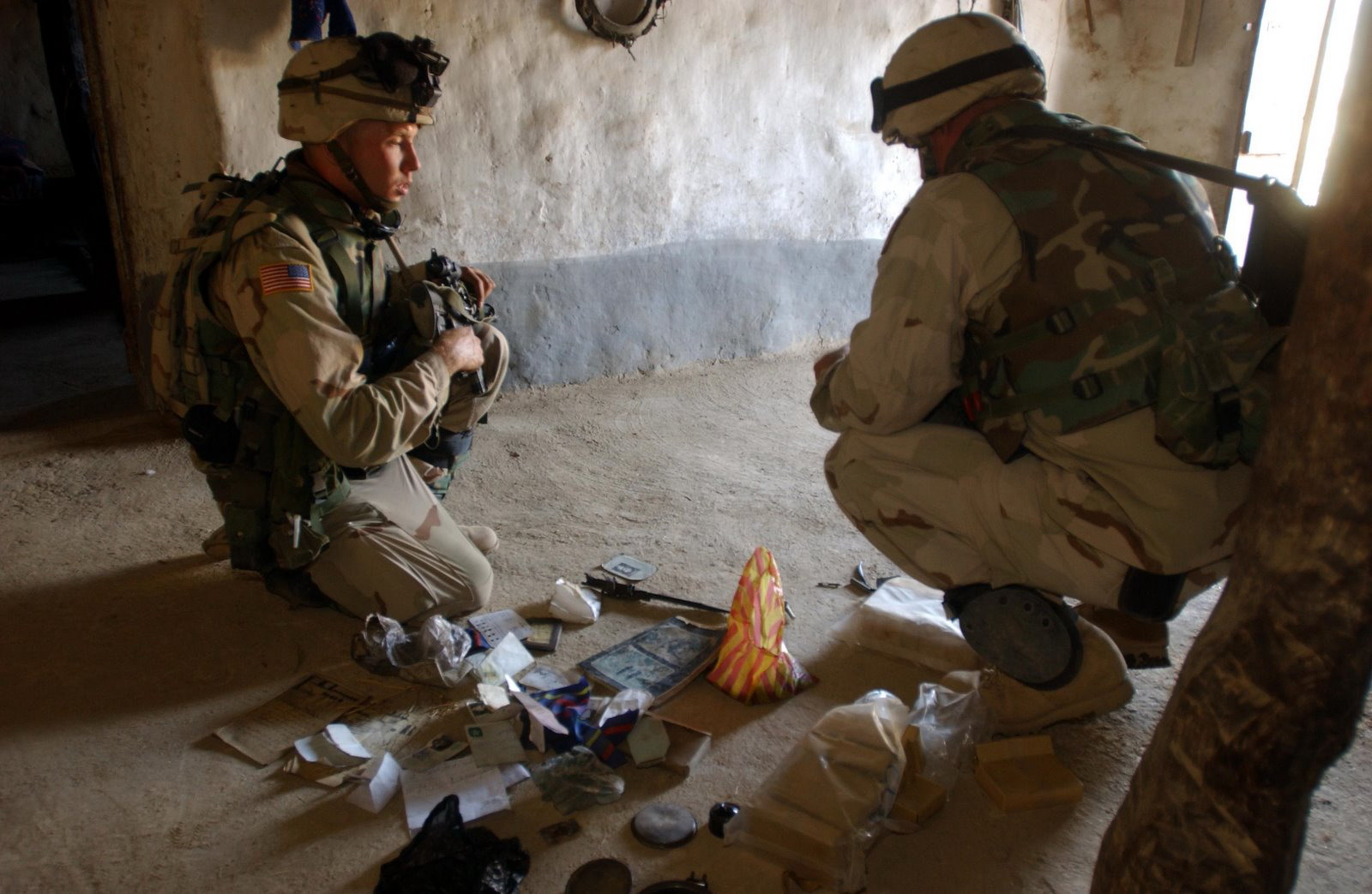
U.S. Army 82d Airborne Division paratroopers securing documents after a raid in Afghanistan during the War in Afghanistan

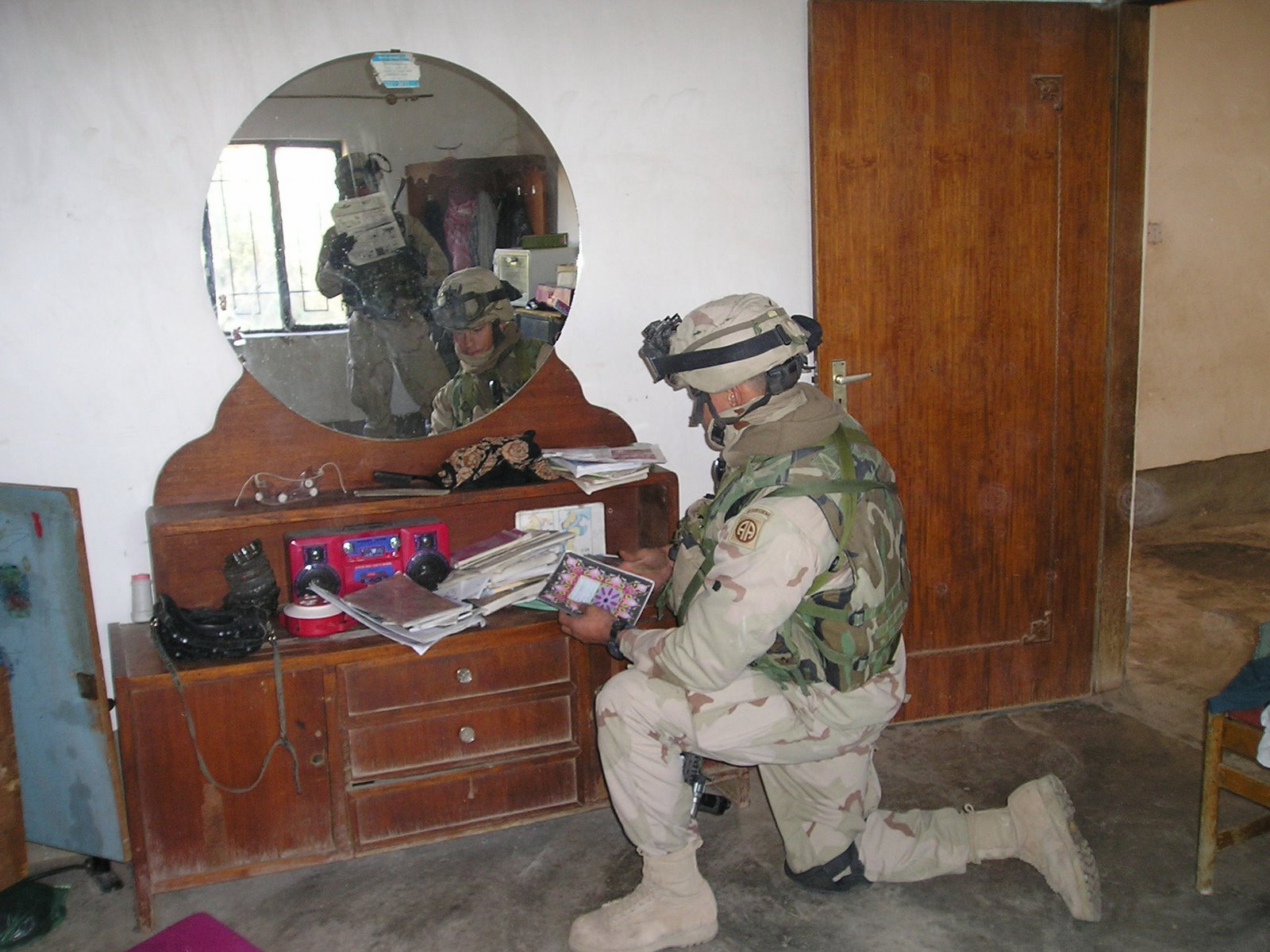
An 82nd Airborne Division paratrooper examining documents found in a raid in Iraq during the Iraq War

Document Exploitation (DOCEX) is a set of military intelligence procedures used by the United States Armed Forces to discover, categorize, and use documents seized in combat operations. It is similar to, but otherwise separate from, Document and Media Exploitation (DOMEX), which is used by the U.S. Intelligence Community and the U.S. government.

DOCEX was formulated during the war on terror, during which U.S. military personnel frequently discovered large volumes of documents in various formats and languages. When documents are found that could have potentially valuable intelligence, DOCEX helps military units rapidly and accurately analyze and interpret the documents for information.

A DOCEX facility was also operated by the Secure Evidence Unit (SEU) of the Iraqi High Tribunal to extract evidence from documents seized from Saddam Hussein's Ba'athist government. Over 6 million pages were processed, mostly from the 1980s, that resulted in numerous execution orders and other incriminating documents being made available to the court.

== Process ==
The DOCEX process occurs at the lowest echelons possible to ensure the information gained from the documents can be understood and used as swiftly as possible. U.S. military personnel learn DOCEX in common skills training, such as the U.S. Army's Basic Leader Course.

The initial intake of captured enemy documents (CED) is performed at the company level by a DOCEX Site Exploitation Team, and first analysis of CED is performed by intelligence personnel assigned to battalion- or brigade-level DOCEX Support Teams. Actionable information gained from this analysis is reported back to the original unit as soon as possible.

The processing of CED progresses from the lowest echelon to the highest, undergoing multiple information extraction applications that increase in complexity and sophistication until the information is categorized as DOMEX under the auspices of the U.S. Intelligence Community and the Director of National Intelligence. The sequence of events in the DOCEX process as performed by a DOCEX Site Exploitation Team is as follows:

1. Receive, Tag
2. Categorize, Inventory, Log
3. Screen
4. Sight Translation (Hybrid Translation/Interpretation)
5. Analyze
6. Report

=== 1. Tag ===
Document accountability begins the moment the document is received into U.S. possession. Original documents must not be marked, altered or defaced and the capturing unit must attach a DD Form 2745 (Enemy Prisoner of War Capture Tag) to each document. Ongoing combat operations suspends this requirement (to tag a document) until cessation of hostilities. All CEDs are placed in weatherproof containers and the containers are marked with a DTG, name of the capturing unit, identity of the source(s) of the CEDs, and a summary of conditions and circumstances under which the CEDs were obtained.

=== 2. Categorize, Inventory, Log ===
The first DOCEX unit to receive CEDs will categorize and inventory all CEDs. Captured enemy documents are assigned file numbers and the following information is logged: name of capturing unit, file number, DTG the CEDs were received by the DOCEX unit, description of the CEDs, destination of outgoing transmittals of CEDs and pertinent remarks. Proper categorization and inventory of captured enemy documents ensures strict accountability and preserves evidentiary value.

=== 3. Screen ===
Document screening is the rapid but systematic evaluation of documents to determine which documents contain priority information. Selected priority documents will be exploited immediately to meet intelligence collection management priorities. For screening purposes, CEDs are considered unclassified unless originated in the U.S. and/or allied nation(s), and are marked classified. The document screening phase is an integral step in the DOCEX process as screening determines applicability of a variety of exploitation treatments and procedures. Interpreters and qualified intelligence analysts working alongside communications and information technology specialists decide the DOCEX course of action during the screening phase. Complete translation is not required at this phase of the DOCEX process, but sufficient translation of documents is required to determine significance and relevance to priority intelligence requirements.

=== 4. Translate ===
Translations in and of themselves are not intelligence reports, but translation is a precondition for DOCEX. Translation reports must include: where the report will be sent, which unit prepared the report, DTG of the translation, document serial number and description of the document, name of translator, type of translation (full, extract or summary), remarks for clarification and classification (if applicable).

=== 5. Analyze ===
Analysis of CEDs produces intelligence and involves three steps: assessment, integration and deduction.

- Assessment – The sifting and sorting of evaluated information to update significant themes with respect to current and imminent operations and commander's intent. Intelligence information deemed urgent will be disseminated at this stage prior to further processing.
- Integration – The combination of newly developed information isolated in the assessment phase with known information to develop an overall picture or hypothesis of enemy activities or environmental factors influencing the area of operation.
- Deduction – Conclusions are drawn from the comparison of CED data with known information to bring about meaningful relations among enemy situations, the area of operation, commander's intent and force protection.

=== 6. Report ===
Information collected from CEDs is normally reported in a SALUTE report or Intelligence Information Report (IIR) (SALUTE = Size, Activity, Location, Unit, Time, Equipment). The IIR is the most widely recognized and accepted format within the Intelligence Community, and is typically generated at higher echelons, such as division, corps or theater commands. SALUTE reports are also referred to as SPOT reports or SPOTREPS and are expeditious reports to provide timely intelligence or status updates regarding events that could have an immediate and significant effect on current planning and operations. Tactical commanders, interrogators and intelligence analysts contribute content for SALUTE reports and IRRs.
