= United States Army Western Hemisphere Command =

Command of the United States Army

U.S. Army Western Hemisphere Command
- USAWHC shoulder sleeve insignia
- Founded: 5 December 2025
- Country: United States
- Branch: United States Army
- Part of: United States Army
- Garrison/HQ: Fort Bragg, North Carolina
- Nickname: America's Theater Army
- Website: www.army.mil/USAWHC

Commanders
- Commanding general: GEN Joseph A. Ryan
- Deputy Commanding General: Vacant
- Command Sergeant Major: CSM Nema Mobar

Insignia
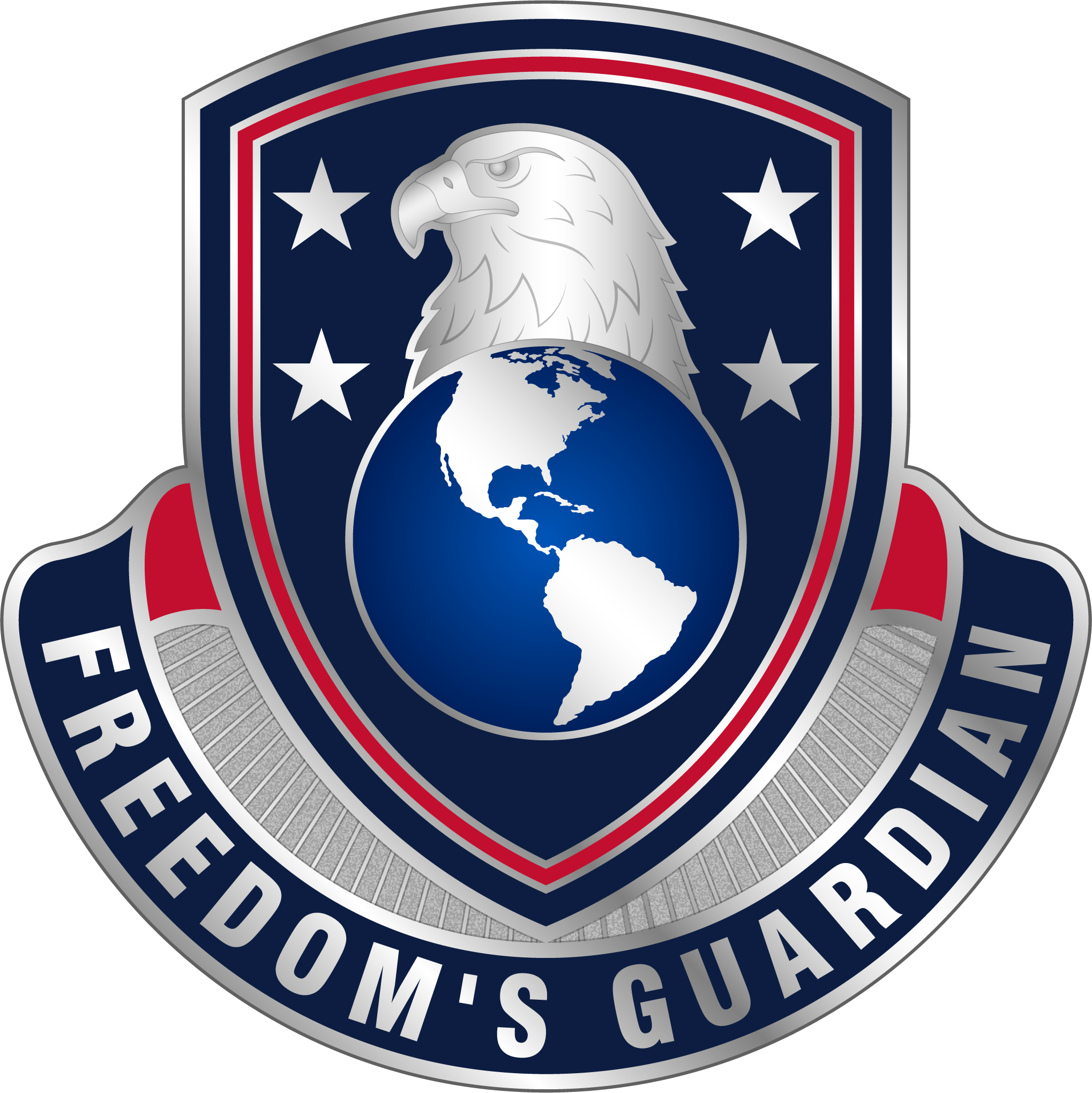
- USAWHC distinctive unit insignia

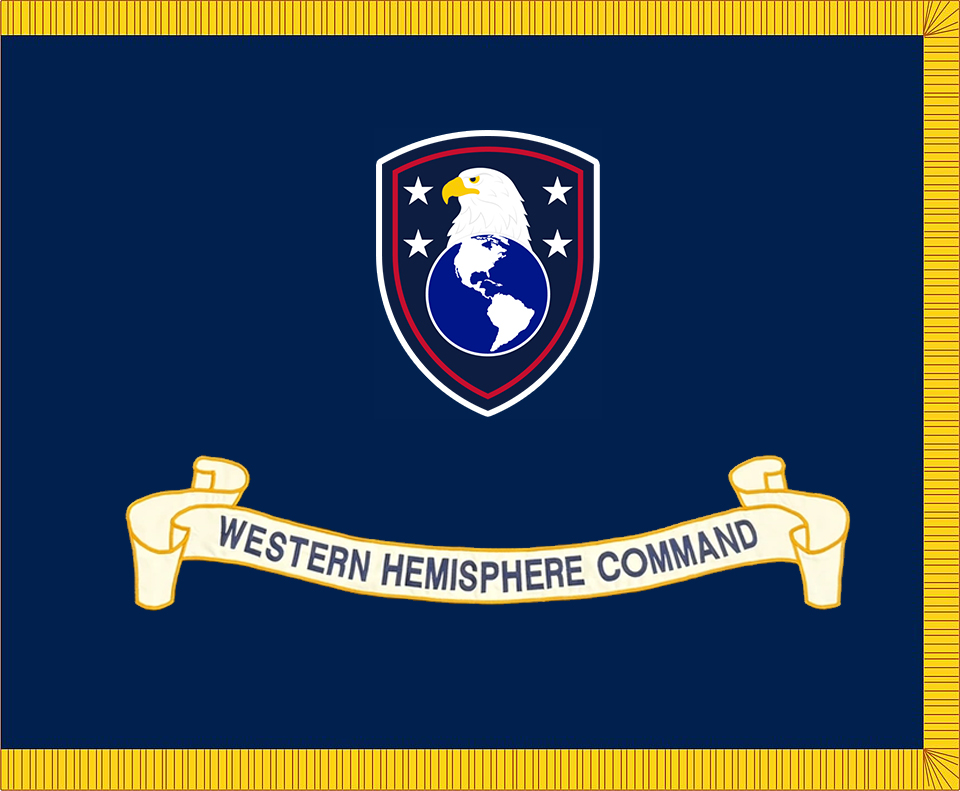
- USAWHC command flag

The United States Army Western Hemisphere Command (USAWHC) is a command of the United States Army. It serves as the theater army and Army Service Component Command (ASCC) for both United States Northern Command (USNORTHCOM) and United States Southern Command (USSOUTHCOM), overseeing operations across North America, Latin America, and the Caribbean. Anticipating full operating capability by summer 2026, the command will oversee local operations, defense of the US southern border, natural disaster response, and general humanitarian assistance in the Western Hemisphere. USAWHC was activated on 5 December 2025, at Fort Bragg in North Carolina.

== History ==
On 5 December 2025, the USAWHC was activated and replaced United States Army Forces Command (FORSCOM). Effective the same date, the United States Army North (ARNORTH) and United States Army South (ARSOUTH) were assigned to USAWHC, including their mission and resources. The establishment of USAWHC is part of a larger reorganization effort by the Army to modernize its command structure and reduce its number of generals. Secretary of Defense Pete Hegseth said on January 14, 2025 at his Senate Armed Services Committee confirmation hearing, “We won World War II with seven four-star generals, Today we have 44.…There is an inverse relationship between the size of staffs and victory on the battlefield. We do not need more bureaucracy at the top. We need more warfighters empowered at the bottom." The secretary also published his plan for the realignment called the Unified Command Plan. Prior to the establishment of USAWHC, an "AMERICOM" proposed by President Donald Trump would merge U.S. Northern Command with U.S. Southern Command.

When ARNORTH and ARSOUTH conclude their Army Service Component Command service to NORTHCOM and SOUTHCOM respectively, USAWHC will become the Army Component of both NORTHCOM and SOUTHCOM. The USAWHC reports directly to Headquarters, Department of the Army. The restructuring through the creation of the USAWHC and the deactivation or merger of the three former commands will cause the relocation or transfer of hundreds of civilian positions, mainly from Fort Sam Houston, in San Antonio, Texas.

In addition to restructuring, the creation of the USAWHC is a major change in U.S. policy under President Donald Trump. Secretary of Defense Pete Hegseth said, "After years of neglect, the United States will restore U.S. military dominance in the Western Hemisphere. We will use it to protect our homeland and access to key terrain throughout the region. We will also deny adversaries' ability to position forces or other threatening capabilities in our hemisphere."

USAWHC will reach its initial operating capability in February 2026, and the command is expected to be fully operational by the summer of 2026. According to a memo from Secretary of the Army Dan Driscoll, FORSCOM, ARNORTH and ARSOUTH will inactivate on 15 October 2026.

The following units were transferred under command of USAWHC (effective 5 December 2025): the First Army, the XVIII Airborne Corps, the 20th CBRNE Command, and the Air Traffic Services Command. The III Armored Corps has been assigned to U.S. Army Europe and Africa (USAREUR-AF), and I Corps has been assigned to United States Army Pacific (USARPAC). On 13 January 2026, it was announced that the responsibilities of the recently deactivated Security Force Assistance Command will be transferred to USAWHC, which will retain two of its former brigades – the 1st SFAB at Fort Benning, Georgia (oriented to the Southern Command area), and the 5th SFAB at Joint Base Lewis-McChord, Washington (oriented to the Indo-Pacific Command area).

The command will also take charge of the PANAMAX and Vigilant Shield exercises. PANAMAX is a U.S.-led multinational exercise, involving troops from Central and South American nations. The other, Vigilant Shield, is a U.S.-based exercise that has troops train for and simulate defense of attacks on the United States.

The Civil Support Training Activity (CSTA) is transitioning to fall under the newly activated U.S. Army Western Hemisphere Command (USAWHC). This move restructures how the Army prepares forces for domestic emergencies, consolidating various command elements. As an subordinate element historically functioning under U.S. Army North, CSTA’s overarching mission will now be directed and supported through the unified front of USAWHC. Despite the structural shift, CSTA will continue its core function of providing collective training and evaluation oversight for Weapons of Mass Destruction Civil Support Teams (WMD-CSTs) and Technical Support Forces. The Civil Support Training Activity helps ensure the readiness of the nation’s military to respond to chemical, biological, radiological, nuclear, and high-yield explosive (CBRN) events. The Training Activity provides training and readiness oversight for the 54 state-based Weapons of Mass Destruction Civil Support Teams (WMD-CSTs) and provides collective training and evaluation support to the 17 CBRN Enhanced Response Force Packages (CERFP), and 10 Homeland Response Forces (HRF) to ensure they are ready to respond and assist civil authorities. The Activity also supports training of allocated Defense CBRN Response Force (DCRF) and Command and Control CBRN Response (C2CRE) units, to ensure that they are ready to assist local, state, federal and tribal partners in responding to a CBRN incident.

The Defense Coordinating Elements (DCE), which facilitate Department of Defense support for disaster relief and civil emergencies, are falling under the newly established U.S. Army Western Hemisphere Command (USAWHC). This structural realignment consolidates prior theater commands and moves staff to Fort Bragg, NC. The ten regional DCEs—which serve as the primary entry points for state and federal requests for military assistance (often tied to FEMA) during disasters—now operate under the umbrella of USAWHC. Defense Coordinating Elements are co-located with the Federal Emergency Management Agency in 10 regions throughout the United States. The elements serve as the Secretary of Defense's representatives to plan and coordinate federal military support requested in accordance with the National Response Framework.

The 512th Engineer Detachment (Geospatial Planning Cell) remains headquartered at Fort Sam Houston, TX, and continues its geospatial operations under USAWHC's Theater Army structure. The 512th GPC consists of approximately 34 soldiers who collect, analyze, manage, and disseminate critical geospatial data and coordinate activities with the National Geospatial-Intelligence Agency (NGA).

== Organization ==
=== Subordinate units ===
- US Western Hemisphere Command

(Organic Forces)

  - First United States Army, Rock Island Arsenal, IL
    - 4th Cavalry Brigade, Fort Knox, KY
    - 87th Training Division (Army Reserve), Birmingham, AL
    - 157th Infantry Brigade, Camp Atterbury, IN
    - 174th Infantry Brigade, Fort Drum, NY
    - 177th Armored Brigade, Camp Shelby, MS
    - 188th Infantry Brigade, Fort Stewart, GA
    - 5th Armored Brigade, Fort Bliss, TX
    - 85th Support Command (Army Reserve), US Army Reserve Center, IL
    - 120th Infantry Brigade, Fort Hood, TX
    - 166th Aviation Brigade, Fort Hood, TX
    - 181st Infantry Brigade, Fort McCoy, WI
    - 189th Infantry Brigade, Fort Lewis, WA
  - III Armored Corps, in Fort Hood (Texas)
    - 1st Infantry Division, at Fort Riley (KS)
      - 1st Armored Brigade Comat Team
      - 2nd Armored Brigade Combat Team
      - 1st Infantry Division Artillery
      - Combat Aviation Brigade, 1st Infantry Division
      - 1st Infantry Division Sustainment Brigade
    - 1st Cavalry Division, at Fort Hood (TX)
      - 1st Armored Brigade Combat Team
      - 2nd Armored Brigade Combat Team
      - 3rd Armored Brigade Combat Team
      - 1st Cavalry Division Artillery
      - Combat Aviation Brigade, 1st Cavalry Division
      - 1st Cavalry Division Sustainment Brigade
    - 1st Armored Division, at Fort Bliss (TX)
      - 1st Armored Brigade Combat Team
      - 2nd Brigade Combat Team
      - 3rd Armored Brigade Combat Team
      - 1st Armored Division Artillery
      - 1st Armored Division Engineer Brigade
      - Combat Aviation Brigade, 1st Armored Division
      - 1st Armored Division Sustainment Brigade
    - 3rd Cavalry Regiment
    - 75th Field Artillery Brigade, at Fort Sill (OK)
    - 36th Engineer Brigade, at Fort Hood (TX)
    - 11th Corps Signal Brigade, at Fort Hood (TX)
    - 504th Military Intelligence Brigade, at Fort Hood (TX)
    - 13th Armored Corps Sustainment Command, at Fort Hood (TX)
    - 1st Medical Brigade, at Fort Hood (TX)
    - 89th Military Police Brigade, at Fort Hood (TX)
  - XVIII Airborne Corps, Fort Bragg, NC
    - 3rd Infantry Division, Fort Stewart, GA
      - 1st Armored Brigade Combat Team
      - 2nd Armored Brigade Combat Team
      - 3rd Infantry Division Artillery
      - Combat Aviation Brigade, 3rd Infantry Division
      - 3rd Sustainment Brigade
    - 10th Mountain Division, Fort Drum, NY
      - 1st Infantry Brigade Combat Team
      - 2nd Infantry Brigade Combat Team
      - 3rd Infantry Brigade Combat Team, Fort Polk, LA
      - 10th Mountain Division Artillery
      - Combat Aviation Brigade, 10th Mountain Division
      - 10th Sustainment Brigade
    - 82nd Airborne Division, Fort Bragg, NC
      - 1st Infantry Brigade Combat Team (Airborne)
      - 2nd Infantry Brigade Combat Team (Airborne)
      - 3rd Infantry Brigade Combat Team (Airborne)
      - 82nd Airborne Division Artillery
      - Combat Aviation Brigade, 82nd Airborne Division
      - 82nd Sustainment Brigade
    - 101st Airborne Division, Fort Campbell, KY
      - 1st Infantry Brigade Combat Team (Air Assault)
      - 2nd Infantry Brigade Combat Team (Air Assault)
      - 3rd Infantry Brigade Combat Team (Air Assault)
      - 101st Airborne Division Artillery
      - Combat Aviation Brigade, 101st Airborne Division
      - 101st Sustainment Brigade
    - 18th Field Artillery Brigade, Fort Bragg, NC
    - 20th Engineer Brigade, Fort Bragg, NC
    - 16th Military Police Brigade, Fort Bragg, NC
    - 3rd Sustainment Command (Expeditionary), Fort Bragg, NC
    - 7th Transportation Brigade, Fort Eustis, VA
    - 525th Military Intelligence Brigade, Fort Bragg, NC
    - 35th Signal Brigade, Fort Gordon, GA
    - 44th Medical Brigade, Fort Bragg, NC
  - 20th CBRNE Command, Aberdeen Proving Ground, MD
    - 48th Chemical Brigade, Fort Hood, TX
    - 52nd Ordnance Group (EOD), Fort Campbell, KY
    - 71st Ordnance Group (EOD), Fort Carson, CO
  - Air Traffic Services Command, Fort Rucker, AL
  - Army Security Cooperation Group–South, Fort Benning, GA
  - Western Hemisphere Institute for Security Cooperation, Fort Benning, GA
  - Joint Task Force 51, Joint Base San Antonio-Fort Sam Houston, Texas
  - Civil Support Training Activity (CSTA)
  - Defense Coordinating Elements (DCE)
  - 512th Engineer Detachment (Geospatial Planning Cell), Fort Sam Houston, Texas

=== Assigned/Allocated/OPCON/Supporting Units ===
- Joint Task Force Bravo, Soto Cano Air Base, Honduras (assigned to U.S. Southern Command)
- Army Support Activity - Soto Cano Air Base, Honduras (assigned to IMCOM and represents the commander, USAWHC at Soto Cano Air Base)
- 167th Theater Sustainment Command (Alabama Army National Guard), Fort McClellan, Alabama
  - 440th Transportation Movement Control Element (TCME), Selma, Alabama
  - 279th Army Field Support Brigade, Huntsville, Alabama
  - 111th Explosive Ordnance Group, Opelika, Alabama
- 377th Theater Sustainment Command, New Orleans, Louisiana
- 470th Military Intelligence Brigade, Fort Sam Houston, Texas
- 56th Signal Battalion, Fort Sam Houston, Texas
- 807th Deployment Support Medical Command, Fort Douglas, Utah
- 525th Military Police Battalion, Guantanamo Bay Naval Base
- Task Force 46 (Michigan Army National Guard), in Lansing, Michigan – CBRN, part of 46th Military Police Command
- Task Force 76 (Army Reserve), in Salt Lake City, Utah – CBRN, part of 76th Operational Response Command
- 505th Military Intelligence Brigade (Theater) (Army Reserve) Fort Sam Houston, Texas
  - 383rd Military Intelligence Battalion, HQ in Belton, Missouri
  - 549th Military Intelligence Battalion, at Camp Bullis, Texas
- 6th Medical Logistics Management Center, Fort Bragg, NC (direct reporting unit)
- 323rd Army Band "Fort Sam's Own"

== Insignia ==
The shoulder sleeve insignia of USAWHC was approved by the Army's Institute of Heraldry. It consists of a navy blue shield, containing a globe that displays the Western Hemisphere, surmounted by the head of a bald eagle. The two stars, doubled left and right, represent the command's four-star status. The red, white and blue colors allude to the national colors of the United States. The SSI of USAWHC was quickly added to the command's first flag, which was created in the two weeks prior to the December 5 activation ceremony by the Defense Logistics Agency Troop Support.

== Leadership ==
The first commander of USAWHC is Gen. Joseph A. Ryan. The command sergeant major of USAWHC is CSM Nema Mobar.

== List of commanding generals ==
No.	Commanding General		Term		
No.	Portrait	Name	Took office	Left office	Term length
As U.S. Army Western Hemisphere Command
1	Joseph A. Ryan	General; Joseph A. Ryan	5 December 2025	Incumbent	345 days
