= R86 =

R86 may refer to:

- HMS Implacable (R86), an aircraft carrier of the Royal Navy
- R-86 Bad Aibling, a former airfield of the United States Army Air Forces in Germany
