= 312th Military Intelligence Battalion (United States) =

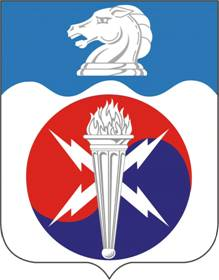
- 312th Military Intelligence Battalion Coat of Arms
- Active: 23rd Signal Construction Battalion 10 February 1944 Camp Pickett, Virginia - 22 January 1946 Fort Lawton, Washington, 27 September 1951 Korea - 15 May 1953; 312th Communications Reconnaissance Battalion 25 June 1955 Germany - 1 July 1956; 312th Army Security Agency Battalion 1 July 1956 - 15 October 1957 West Germany; 312th Military Intelligence Battalion, 1st Cavalry Division 1 October 1981 - 15 October 2005 Fort Hood, Texas; 312th Military Intelligence Battalion, 470th Military Intelligence Brigade 6 May 2017 Fort Sam Houston, Texas - Present
- Country: United States
- Branch: United States Army; Military Intelligence Corps
- Type: Military Intelligence
- Role: all-source; counterintelligence; human intelligence
- Size: Battalion
- Part of: 470th Military Intelligence Brigade
- Garrison/HQ: Fort Sam Houston
- Nickname: Silent Warriors
- Mottos: Semper Veritas; (Always the Truth)
- Colors: Oriental Blue Silver Gray
- Engagements: China–Burma–India Theater; Vietnam War; Korean War; Gulf War; Global war on terrorism; Iraq War
- Decorations: Valorous Unit Award; 6 Apr 2004 to 23 Aug 2004; Meritorious Unit Commendation; SOUTHWEST ASIA 4 Oct 1990 - 6 Apr 1991; 10 Sep 2003 to 15 Jun 2005; World War II; Korean War; United Nations Summer-Fall Offensive; Second Korean Winter; Korean Defense Summer-Fall, 1952; Third Korean Winter; Korea, Summer 1953; Gulf War; Defense of Saudi Arabia; Liberation and Defense of Kuwait; Iraq War; Iraqi Governance; National Resolution

Commanders
- Current commander: LTC Matthew F. DeSabio (June 2025-)

Insignia
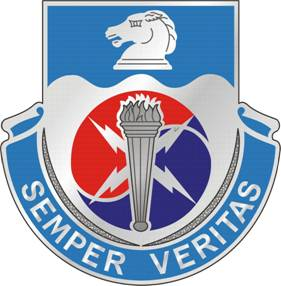
- Distinctive Unit Insignia

- Beret Flash (LRSD)

The 312th Military Intelligence Battalion, nicknamed the “Silent Warriors”, formerly known as 23rd Signal (Heavy/Light) Construction Battalion, 312th Communications Reconnaissance Battalion, and 312th Army Security Agency Battalion, is an active duty Military Intelligence Battalion of the United States Army. The 312th Military Intelligence Battalion is stationed at Fort Sam Houston, Texas where it conducts all-source, signals intelligence, geospatial intelligence, open source intelligence, counterintelligence and human intelligence operations in support of US Army Western Hemisphere Command, United States Southern Command, and United States Northern Command requirements.

== Unit history ==
=== 23rd Signal Construction Battalion (1943-1953) ===
The 312th Military Intelligence Battalion traces its origins to December 31, 1943, when it was constituted as the 23rd Signal Construction Battalion. Activated on February 10, 1944, at Camp Pickett, Virginia. It was redesignated the 23rd Signal (Light) Construction Battalion on Apr 24 and the 23rd Signal (Heavy) Construction Battalion Aug 21.

==== WWII (1945) ====
The battalion deployed to the China–Burma–India Theater in WWII in April 1945 until 24 December 1945. The battalion sailed on the USS General LeRoy Eltinge's maiden voyage on their way to Burma. The battalion's primary mission was to construct and maintain vital communication lines along Ledo Road near Myitkyina, Burma. This included tasks such as laying telephone and telegraph lines, establishing communication centers, and ensuring reliable communication for military operations. The battalion's work was crucial for coordinating troop movements, artillery support, and other critical aspects of combat operations. After its deployment, the unit returned to the United States and was inactivated at Fort Lawton, Washington, on January 22, 1946.

==== Korean War (1951-1953) ====
During the Korean War, the battalion was redesignated as the 23rd Signal Construction Battalion on September 27, 1951, and activated in Korea on November 2 and assigned to the Eighth Army. The battalion was inactivated on May 15, 1953 in Korea. A company predecessor, Company "B" as the 191st Counter Intelligence Corps Detachment, was also activated in Korea in 1950 in support of the 1st Cavalry Division.

=== 312th Communications Reconnaissance Battalion (1955-1956) ===
On May 19, 1955 the battalion was converted to a signals intelligence unit and redesignated the 312th Communications Reconnaissance Battalion and assigned to the Army Security Agency (ASA) Europe Command coinciding with the commands relocation of Hq ASA Austria. The Battalion was organized with a Headquarters and Headquarters Company (HHC) and 4 Detachments along with some subordinate units. On June 25, The (HHC) was activated at the Bad Aibling Station in Germany along with Detachment A. Detachment B was located near Landshut, Germany. Detachment C was located at Weiden, Germany until its inactivation on April 1, 1956. Detachment D was activated February 17, in Campoformido, Italy. The 328th Communications Reconnaissance Company and its 7 Detachments, as well as the332d ASA Company and 22d ASA Detachment, fell under the battalions operational control. The primary mission of the battalion was to perform communications intelligence (COMINT) and communications security (COMSEC) functions directed by ASA, Europe.

=== 312th Army Security Agency Battalion (1956-1957) ===
The battalion was redesignated the 312th Army Security Agency Battalion on July 1, 1956. The battalion consisted of several detachments and subordinate units that carried over the previous designation including (HHC), 328th and 332d ASA companies (later the 180th and 181st USASA companies), Detachment A in Bad Aibling, Detachment D One in Verona, Italy that supported the Southern European Task Force (SETAF), Detachment D Two in Udine, Italy, and Detachment L which was operated by the 332d ADA at a forward intercept site in Nottau, Germany. The battalion continued its mission to provide, operate, and control designated intercept facilities. The battalion was responsible for wo significant intelligence gathering missions. It gathered intelligence on the 1956 Poznań protests, and intelligence on Soviet Forces in Hungary (SFH) and the Hungarian Army during the Hungarian Revolution of 1956. The 312th ASA (HHC) was inactivated on October 15, 1957, at Bad Aibling Station in Germany and subordinate units were assigned to the 320th USASA Battalion taking over operations.

=== Vietnam War (1965-1972) ===
In July 1965, two company predecessors, Company "A" as the 10th Radio Research Unit and the 371st Radio Research Company, and Company "B" as the 191st Military Intelligence Company, deployed to the Vietnam War with the 1st Cavalry Division (Airmobile).

=== 312th Military Intelligence Battalion (Electronic Warfare Combat) Provisional (1977-1981) ===
On April 6, 1977, the 312th Military Intelligence Battalion (EWC) Provisional (CEWI) was organized. It was formed to support the 1st Cavalry Division with electronic warfare under a single command with the 191st Combat Intelligence Company and 371st Army Security Agency Company acting as subordinate units, along with B Company, activated on July 18, 1977, as the Ground Surveillance Radar (GSR) company and C Company, activated Nov 1, 1978, as the battalion's Maintenance company.

=== 312th Military Intelligence Battalion, 1st Cavalry Division (1981-2005) ===
On October 1, 1981, it was redesignated and activated as a separate battalion under the 1st Cavalry Division starting with 4 companies. (HHC) that contained the command and staff elements, A Company that contained the electronic warfare assets, B Company that contained the ground surveillance radar company, and C Company that contained the combat support and maintenance company. The histories and lineages of the 371st and 191st were consolidated with Companies A and B of the new battalion. D Company was originally formed around 1987 with BAT-D, and UAV sections, along with the Long Range Surveillance Detachment (LRSD). D Company was later reorganized in 1995. The Analysis and Control Element (ACE) Detachment was assigned to the Battalion in 1999.

==== Persian Gulf War, Southwest Asia (1990-1991) ====
The battalion deployed to Saudi Arabia on September 15, 1990 with the 1st Cavalry Division under XVIII Airborne Corps, taking part in Operations Desert Shield and Desert Storm and redeploying to Fort Hood in April 1991. During the Golf War the unit was on the Saudi-Iraqi border north of Hafar Albatin.

==== Post Gulf War (1991-2003) ====
Between 1991 and 2003, the battalion underwent modernization along with deploying soldiers 7 times to the National Training Center, six times in support of JTF-6 counter-narcotics missions, 4 times to Kuwait, 2 times Somalia, once to Twenty-nine Palms for a joint Army/Marine Exercise, and once to Idaho for domestic disaster response operations.

On November 16, 1995, it reorganized under a new “A‑series” structure with a headquarters, general support, and three direct support companies. October 15, 1999 the (ACE) which originally formed in support of the Division was assigned as a Detachment.

==== Operation Iraqi Freedom (2003-2005) ====
On September 20, 2003, Company “C” deployed to Iraq attached to the 82nd Airborne Division as part of Operation Iraqi Freedom, employing the Shadow UAV system for reconnaissance. The full battalion followed in March 2004 during OIF II, supporting the 1st Cavalry Division in Baghdad.

==== Inactivation (2005) ====
Due to the 1st Cavalry Division modular force restructure, on 15 October 2005, the 312th Military Intelligence Battalion was inactivated at Fort Hood, Texas and integrated into the division’s Special Troop Battalions.

=== 312th Military Intelligence Battalion, 470th Military Intelligence Brigade (2017-present) ===
The 312th Military Intelligence Battalion, as the "Operation's Forward Collections Battalion" under the 470th Military Intelligence Brigade, conducts all-source and CI/HUMINT intelligence operations in support of U.S. Army South and SOUTHCOM requirements.

==== Reactivation (2017) ====
On May 6, 2017, the 312th Military Intelligence Battalion was reactivated under the 470th Military Intelligence Brigade at Joint Base San Antonio, Fort Sam Houston, TX.

== Companies & Detachments ==
=== Company “A” lineage ===
==== 313 Army Security Agency Battalion, Company "C" (1962-1965) ====
The 312th Military Intelligence Battalion, Company “A”, first activated as the 313 Army Security Agency Battalion, Company “C” on May 25, 1962 at Two Rock Ranch Station, Petaluma, California. After their initial tanning, they deployed to Germany in 1963 to 1965.

==== 10th Radio Research Unit (1965-1966) ====
In 1965 the company was recalled from Germany and deployed to Vietnam on Aug 1 as the 10th Radio Research Unit and assigned to the 53d US Army Security Agency Special Operations Command in support of the 1st Cavalry Division (Airmobile) at Camp Radcliff, in the An Khê District. On April 10, 1966 the company was reassigned back the 313th Army Security Agency Battalion. As the 10th RRU, the Company received a "Meritorious Unit Commendation", and a "Presidential Unit Citation" in the Pleiku Province.

==== 371st Radio Research Unit (1966-1968) ====
The Unit was redesignated on October 15, 1966 as the 371st Radio Research Unit in support of the 1st Cavalry Division. It was known for its involvement in Operation Left Bank, a notoriously dangerous airborne radio direction-finding operation using UH-1D “Huey” helicopters nicknamed The Good, The Bad, and The Ugly. As the 371st RRU, the unit received a "Presidential Unit Citation" in the Binh Thuan Province while attached to the 2d Battalion, 7th Cavalry.

==== 371st Radio Research Company (1968-1971) ====
The Company was redesignated on February 23, 1968, as the 371st Radio Research Company and assigned to the US Army Security Agency Field Station at Phu Bai Combat Base, in central Vietnam. the Company was relocated to Camp Evans on 17 March 1968. On October 16, 1968, the Company was assigned to the 303rd Army Security Agency Battalion. It relocated to "Camp Gorvad" at the Phước Vĩnh Base Camp on November 11, 1968. As the 371st RRC, it received a Republic of Vietnam Civil Action Honor Medal, First Class Citation, 3 "Republic of Vietnam Cross of Gallantry with Palm Citations", 3 "Meritorious Unit Commendations", and On April 29, 1971, the Company redeployed to Fort Hood, Texas with the 1st Cavalry Division.

==== 1st Cavalry Division, 371st Army Security Agency Company (1971-1981) ====
Upon redeployment to Fort Hood, the Company was redesignated the 371st Army Security Agency Company and assigned directly to the 1st Cavalry Division as an Army Security Agency unit. On April 6, 1977, the Unit was assigned to the 312th as a company. It was deactivated in October 1981, and consolidated into the battalion's Company "A".

=== Company “B” lineage ===
==== 191st Counter Intelligence Corps Detachment (1950-1959) ====
On September 25, 1950, the 191st Counter Intelligence Corps (CIC) Detachment was constituted. It was Activated on October 6, 1950 in Korea in support the 1st Cavalry Division. The Detachment was inactivated on June 24, 1956 and reactivated again on October 15, 1957.

==== 191st Military Intelligence Detachment(1959-1969) ====
The (CIC) Detachment was reorganized and redesignated May 15, 1959, as the 191st Military Intelligence Detachment.

===== Long Range Reconnaissance Patrol Detachment (1967) =====
On January 7, 1967, a provisional Long Range Reconnaissance Patrol (LRRP) unit was established within the 1st Cavalry Division under the operational umbrella of the 191st Military Intelligence Company. By February 2, the unit's provisional status was lifted, and it was placed under the operational control of the division's G-2 section as a detachment. On December 20, 1967, the (LRRPD) was redesignated as Company “E”, 52nd Infantry, and separated from the 1st Cavalry Division.

==== 191st Military Intelligence Company (1969-1981) ====
On December 26, 1969, the 191st Military Intelligence Detachment was reorganized and redesignated as the 191st Military Intelligence Company. The Company inactivated in Vietnam on 15 August 1972 and later was reactivated at Fort Hood, Texas on June 21, 1975. On July 2, 1977, it was reassigned to the 312th Military Intelligence Battalion. In October 1981, it was deactivated and consolidated into the battalion's Company "B"

=== 1st Cavalry Division, Long Range Surveillance Detachment (LRSD) (1987-1995) ===
A Long Range Surveillance Detachment (LRSD) was assigned to the 312th Military Intelligence Battalion in 1987. It was part of Company "D" along side BAT-D and UAV sections. It was inactivated June 14, 1995. The unit was reactivated 2 days later as a III Corps unit, combined 2nd Armored Division's 522nd Military Intelligence Battalion's LSRD to form Company E 52nd Infantry Regiment.

=== 1st Cavalry Division, Analysis and Control Element (ACE) (1995-present) ===
In 1995, the 1st Cavalry Division, Analysis and Control Element (ACE) was formed with a merger of the 1st Cavalry Division, All Source Production Section (ASPS) and the 312th Military Intelligence Battalion, Tactical Control and Analysis Element (TCAE) It provided intelligence for the Bosnian-Herzegovina Stabilization Force (SFOR) from 1998 to 1999.

==== ACE Detachment (1999-2003) ====
On 15 October 1999, the 312th Military Intelligence ACE Detachment was formed. The detachment provided intelligence information to the Division, Corps, Theater, and National agencies, for worldwide contingency operations. The ACE remained a detachment until mid 2003, when it was integrated into 312th HHC for deployment to Iraqi Freedom II.

==== Post Detachment (2003-present) ====
Assigned to the 312th Military Intelligence Battalion Headquarters Company, The ACE deployed to Iraqi Freedom II from March 2004 to March 2005. It was stationed at Camp Victory at the Baghdad International Airport. It provided theater intelligence analysis for the 1st Cavalry Division, other units and national agencies. Upon the inactivation of the 312th Military Intelligence Battalion on 15 October 2005, The ACE was integrated into the Special Troops Battalion. In April 2010 Special Troops Battalion was inactivated and the (ACE) now operates as a platoon within the Signal, Intelligence, Sustainment Company (SISCO), Headquarters and Headquarters Battalion (HHBN) within the 1st Cavalry Division.

== Unit Commanders ==
- LTC Matthew F. DeSabio (June 2025 – Present)
- LTC Benjamin A. Smith (June 2023-June 2025)
- LTC Ken Carel (June 2021-June 2023)
- LTC Veronica Carrol (June 2019-June 2021)
- LTC Christopher S. Synowiez (May 2017-June 2019)
- LTC Christopher S. Ballard (July 2003-April 2005) → Retired in 2017 as a Major General, NSA SIGINT Deputy Director
- LTC Robert Meeks (June 2001-July 2003)
- LTC Mary A. Legere (May 1999-June 2001) → Retired in 2016 as a Lieutenant General, Deputy Chief of Staff, G2 United States Army
- LTC Carolyn A. Stewart (1997-1999)
- LTC Patrick L. Neky (1995-1997)
- LTC Michael J Stewart (1993-1995)
- LTC Maxie McFarland (1991-1993) Military Intelligence Hall of Fame (2014)
- LTC Rick Armstrong (1989-1991)
- LTC Kevin J. Vargas (1987-1989)
- LTC Marland J. Burkhardt (1983-1987)
- LTC William P. Walters (1980-1983) Military Intelligence Hall of Fame (1993)
- LTC Peter McDonald
- LTC R. Gordon Pynes, Jr (1977-)

== Unit Command Sargent Majors ==
- CSM Luis White (January 2024 – Present)
- CSM William Barclay (December 2021-January 2024)
- CSM Jaime L. Camacho (October 2019-December 2021) → Retired in 2022
- CSM John D. Eldredge (2017-October 2019)
- CSM Franklin A. Saunders (2001-2004) → Retired as the US Army G2 Command Sergeant Major in 2010. Military Intelligence Hall of Fame (2013)
- CSM Otto (1999-2001)
- CSM Larry Johnson (1997-1999)
- CSM Vivian Diaz (1995-1997)
- CSM David "Hua" Shiple (1993-1995)
- CSM Lonnie Bagwell (1991-1993)
- CSM Coonrod (1989-1991)
- CSM Freddie Chapman (1987-1989)
- CSM Peter Gruener (1984-1987)
- CSM Jose Garcia (1981-1984)
- CSM David B Myers (?)

== See also ==
- 470th Military Intelligence Brigade
