= 167th Theater Sustainment Command =

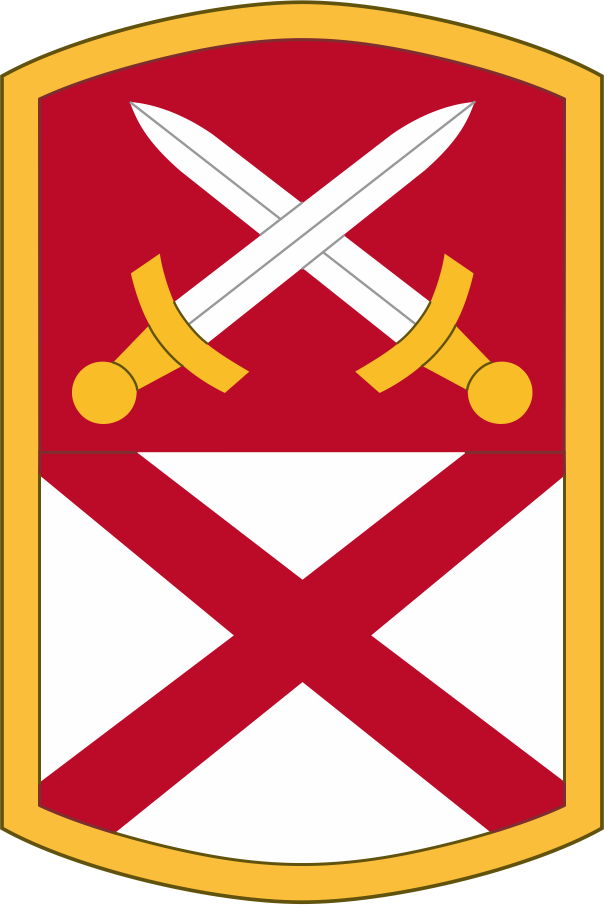
- Active: 2009-present
- Country: United States
- Allegiance: United States Army Western Hemisphere Command
- Branch: United States Army National Guard
- Role: Sustainment
- Size: Command
- Part of: Alabama Army National Guard
- Garrison/HQ: Fort McClellan, Alabama
- Motto: They Rely On Us
- Engagements: World War II; New Guinea (with arrowhead); Southern Philippines
- Decorations: Philippine Presidential Unit Citation

Commanders
- Current commander: MG Michael D. Evans
- Command Sergeant Major: CSM Martin Tillery

Insignia
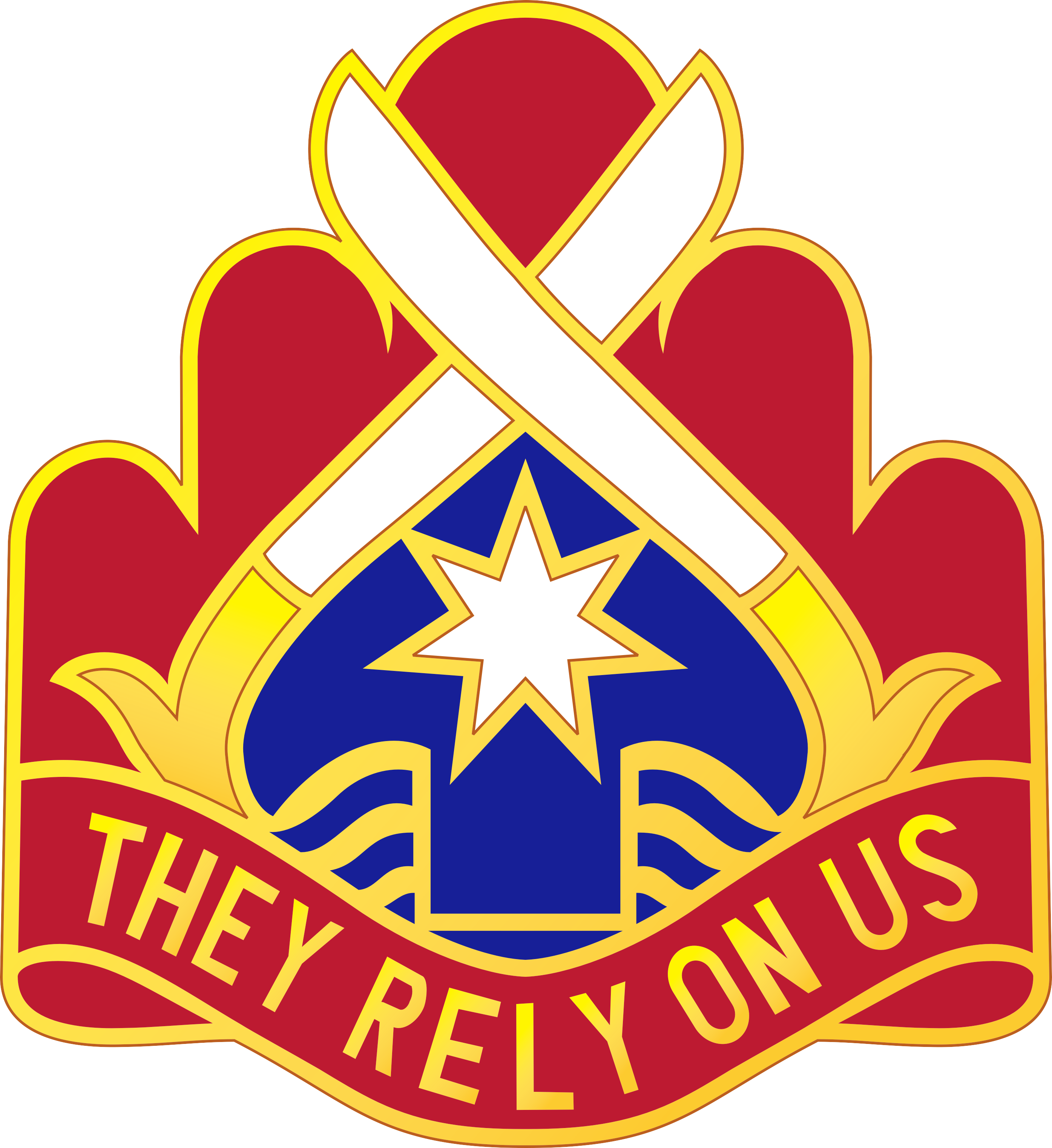
- 167th Theater Sustainment Command DUI

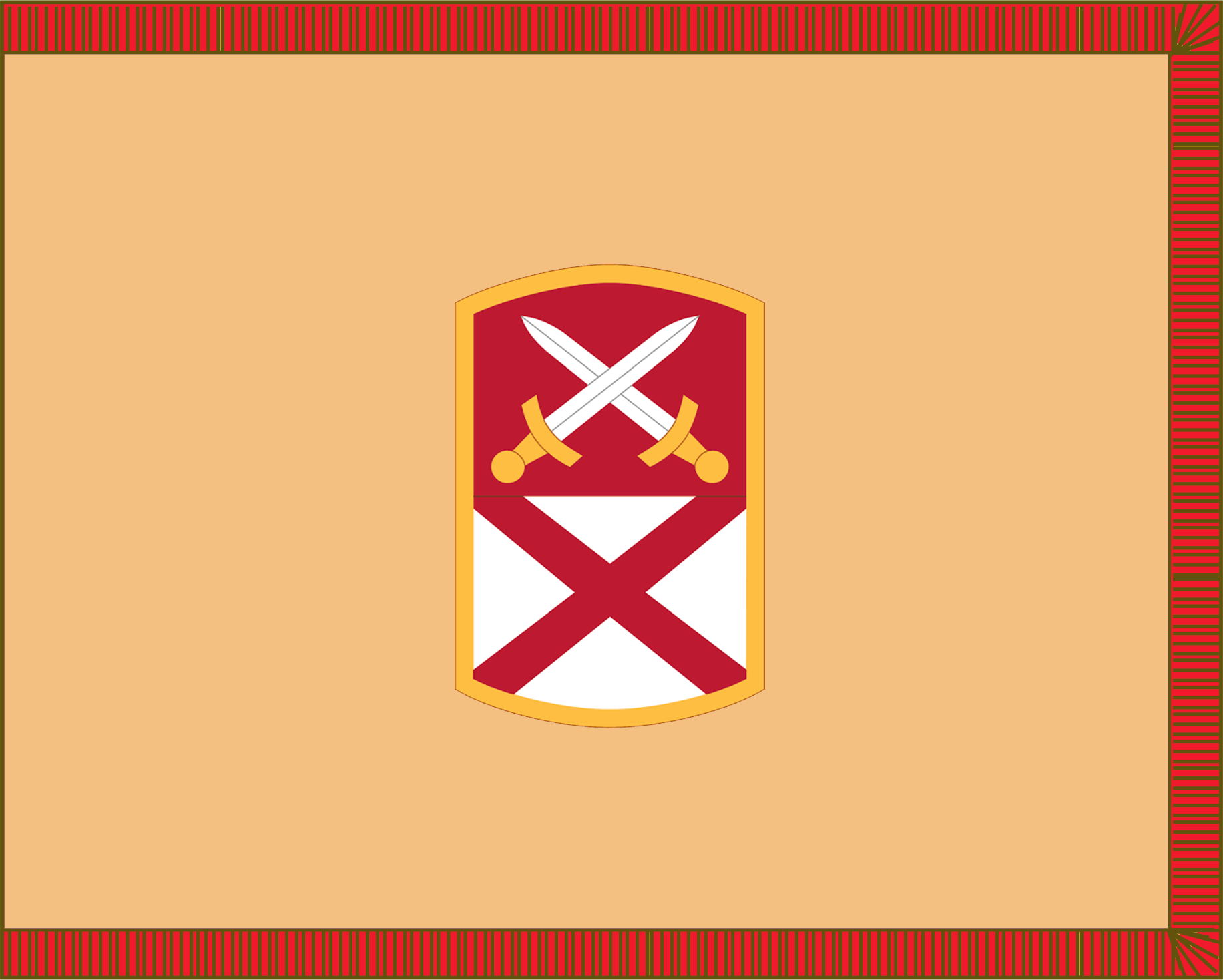
- 167th Sustainment Command Flag

The 167th Theater Sustainment Command (167 TSC) is a unit of the Alabama National Guard since 2009 and is the only theater level sustainment command in the National Guard. Beginning in the 1920s as an infantry company serving in World War II with the 31st Infantry Division; 167 TSC first became a support unit in January 1968 as the 167th Support Brigade. It has been redesignated with a similar role several times 1976 as a Support Command, 2006 as a Sustainment Command and in 2009 as a TSC.

The unit retains campaign participation from World War II campaigns in New Guinea (with arrowhead) and Southern Philippines and a Philippine Presidential Unit Citation. And recently they participated in the Global War on Terror.

In its current role it has been conducting field training readiness exercises for future large-scale combat operations (LSCO). Its primary mission is supporting ARNORTH and being able to conduct Homeland Defense missions for disaster relief.

== Subordinate Units ==
- 167th Theater Sustainment Command
  - Headquarters & Headquarters Company, at Fort McClellan, Anniston
  - Special Troops Battalion, at Fort McClellan, Anniston
  - 778th Maintenance Company, at Fort Guy French, Jackson
    - Detachment 1, at Fort Short Milsap, Monroeville
  - 329th Judge Advocate General Detachment (Field Trial Defense Team)
  - 1930th Judge Advocate General Detachment (Regional Trial Defense Team
  - 440th Transportation Movement Control Element (TCME), in Selma
  - 279th Army Field Support Brigade
    - Headquarters & Headquarters Company, in Huntsville
    - 1169th Contingency Contracting Battalion, in Huntsville
    - 1960th Contingency Contracting Team, in Huntsville
  - 111th Explosive Ordnance Group
    - Headquarters & Headquarters Company, in Opelika
    - 1307th Explosive Hazard Coordination Cell, in Huntsville
