= 6th Medical Logistics Management Center =

U.S. Army Direct Reporting Unit

6th Medical Logistics Management Center (6MLMC)
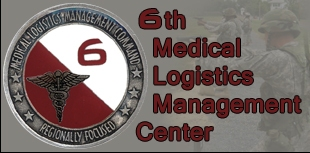
- 6MLMC Logo
- Active: 25 May 1943 - 4 November 1945 17 January 1955 - 20 September 1958; 29 November 1965 - 30 October 1971 16 November 1994 - Present
- Country: United States
- Branch: United States Army
- Part of: United States Army Western Hemisphere Command
- Motto: "One Team!"

The 6th Medical Logistics Management Center (6MLMC), a direct reporting unit of U.S. Army Western Hemisphere Command at Fort Bragg, North Carolina, with administrative control and training readiness authority to the Medical Research and Development Command at Fort Detrick, Maryland, and serves as the Army's only deployable medical materiel management center worldwide.

== Mission ==
When directed, 6th Medical Logistics Management Center (MLMC) deploys to provide centralized medical materiel lifecycle management to designated forces in order to sustain worldwide Geographical Combatant Command (GCC) contingency operations and Defense Support of Civil Authorities (DSCA).

== Lineage and honors information ==
- Lineage
  - Constituted 23 February 1943 in the Army of the United States as the 6th Convalescent Hospital
  - Activated 25 May 1943 at Camp Ellis, Illinois
  - Inactivated 4 November 1945 at the New York Port of Embarkation
  - Redesignated 29 November 1954 as the 6th Convalescent Center and allotted to the Regular Army
  - Activated 17 January 1955 in Germany
  - Inactivated 20 September 1958 in Germany
  - Activated 29 November 1965 at Fort Sam Houston, Texas
  - Inactivated 30 October 1971 in Vietnam
  - Redesignated 16 November 1994 as the 6th Theater Medical Materiel Management Center (TMMMC) and activated at Fort Detrick, Maryland
  - Redesignated 16 October 2000 as the 6th Medical Logistics Management Center (MLMC) and activated at Fort Detrick, Maryland
- 6th Medical Center Honors, campaign participation credit
  - World War II: Normandy; Northern France; Rhineland; Ardennes-Alsace; Central Europe
  - Vietnam: Counteroffensive; Counteroffensive, Phase II; Counteroffensive, Phase III; Tet Counteroffensive; Counteroffensive, Phase IV; Counteroffensive, Phase V; Counteroffensive, Phase VI; Tet 69/Counteroffensive; Summer-Fall 1969; Winter-Spring 1970; Sanctuary Counteroffensive; Counteroffensive, Phase VII; Consolidation I
  - Global War on Terror: Campaigns to be Determined
- Decorations
  - Meritorious Unit Commendation (Army) for EUROPEAN THEATER
  - Meritorious Unit Commendation (Army) for VIETNAM 1966-1967
  - Meritorious Unit Commendation (Army) for VIETNAM 1969-1970
  - Meritorious Unit Commendation (Army) (Forward Team/Detachment) for Operations Enduring Freedom and Iraqi Freedom 1 JAN 2003 - 31 JAN 2004

== Commanders ==
6th Convalescent Center, Baumholder Kasserne, Federal Republic of Germany
The Commander of the 98th General Hospital also served as the commander of the 6th Convalescent Center, which was co-located

No.	Name	Dates of tenure	Rank
1	Albert H. Robinson	17 January 1955 - June 1956	Colonel
2	Rollin L. Bauchspies	October 1957 - 20 September 1958	Colonel

6th Convalescent Center, Republic of Vietnam

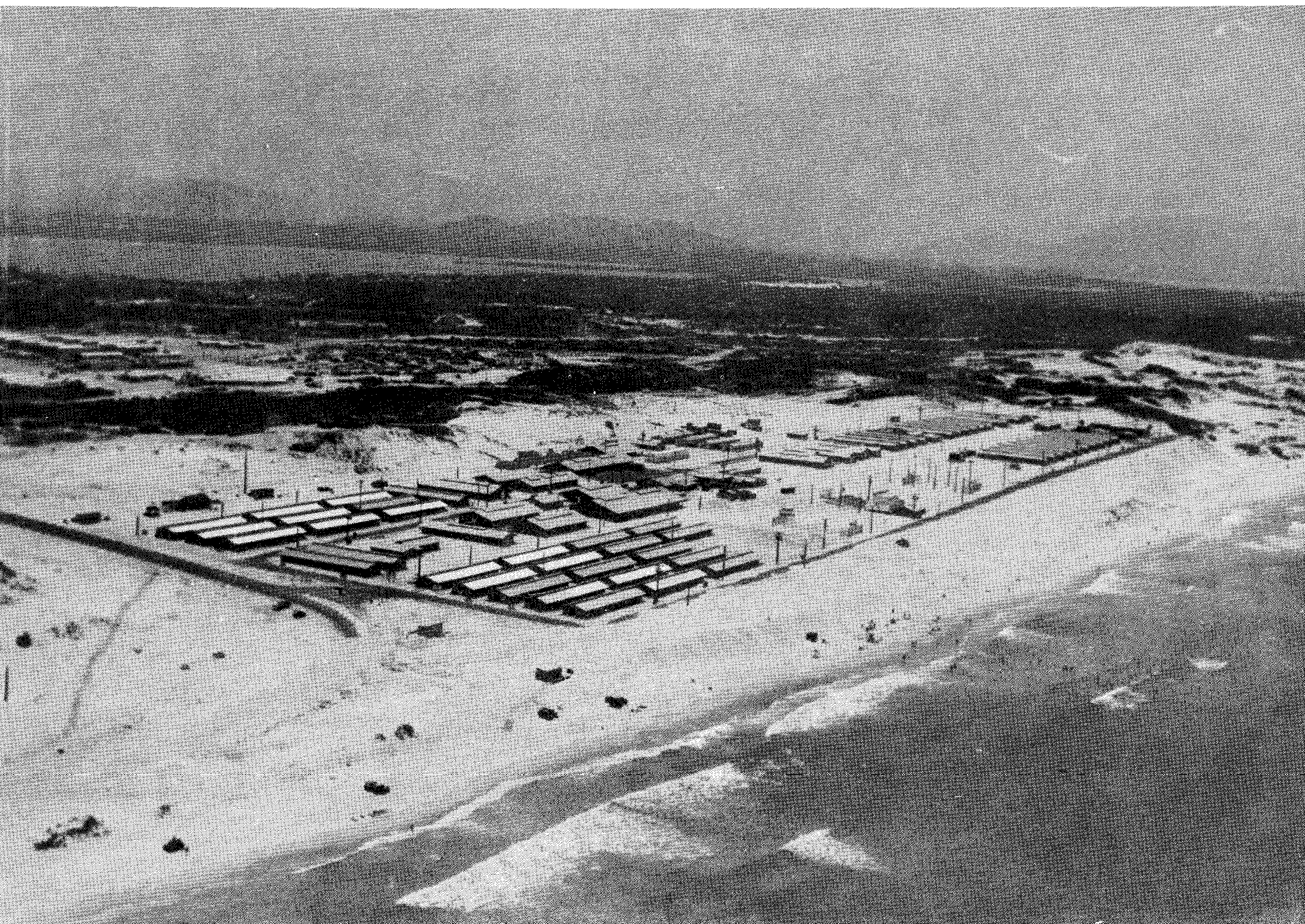
6th Convalescent Center, Cam Ranh Bay

No.	Name	Dates of tenure	Rank
1	Sigmunder E. Dalberg	1965-1967	Lieutenant Colonel
2	Anton L. Hitzelberger	1967	Lieutenant Colonel
3	Bruce T. Bowers	1967-1968	Lieutenant Colonel
4	James B. Lindahl	1968-18 July 1969	Lieutenant Colonel
5	James A. Shafer	19 July 1969 – 18 July 1970	Colonel
6	Joseph E. Kmiecik	19 July 1970 – 10 January 1971	Colonel
7	John S. Schaub	11 January 1971 – 14 July 1971	Major
8	Robert M. Fike	15 July 1971 – 30 October 1971	Lieutenant Colonel

6th Medical Logistics Management Center

No.	Name	Dates of tenure	Rank
1	Hank Cintron	1994–1997	Lieutenant colonel
2	Roger W. Olsen	1997–1999	Lieutenant colonel
3	Vikki Stocker	1999–2001	Lieutenant colonel
4	William R. Fry	2001–2004	Colonel
5	Ralph H. Sees	2004–2006	Colonel
6	William E. Ackerman	2006–2007	Lieutenant colonel
7	Michael S. McDonald	2007–2009	Colonel
8	Michael P. Ryan	2009-2011	Colonel
9	Michael J. Talley	2011-2013	Colonel
10	Anthony R. Nesbitt	2013–2015	Colonel
11	Derek C. Cooper	2015–2017	Colonel
12	David L. Sloniker	2017-MAY 2019	Colonel
13	Ross A. Davidson	May 2019 – May 2021	Colonel
14	Victor A. Suarez	May 2021 – June 2023	Colonel
15	Jason W. Hughes	June 2023 - Present	Colonel
