= Mary A. Legere =

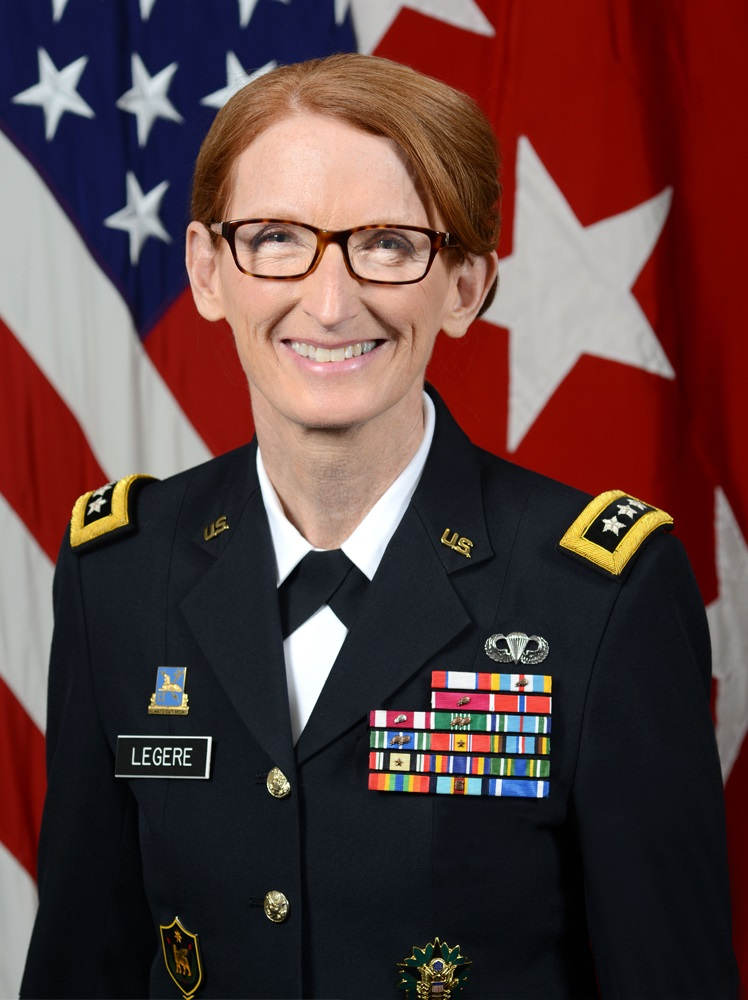
- Military career
- Allegiance: United States
- Branch: United States Army
- Service years: 1982–2016
- Rank: Lieutenant General
- Commands: United States Army Intelligence and Security Command; 501st Military Intelligence Brigade
- Conflicts: Iraq War
- Awards: Army Distinguished Service Medal; Defense Superior Service Medal (2); Legion of Merit (2); Bronze Star Medal

Mary A. Legere is a retired lieutenant general and the former Deputy Chief of Staff for Intelligence (G-2) of the United States Army.

== Military career ==
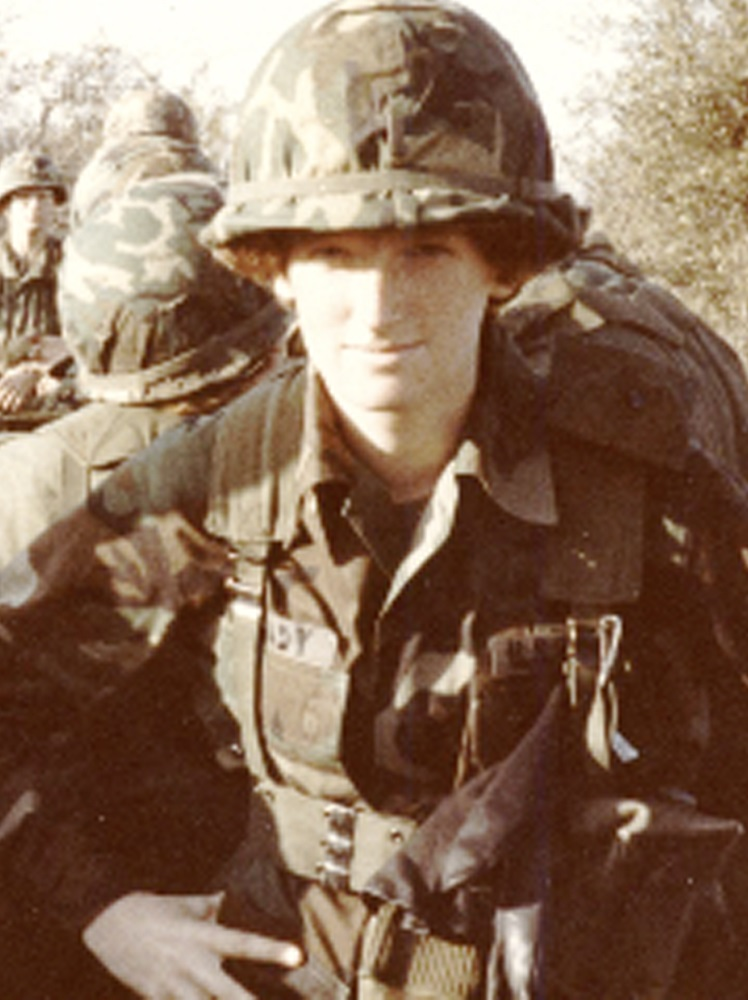
Mary A. Legere, who joined the Army in 1982 through the Reserve Officer Training Corps

Legere attended the University of New Hampshire, receiving a bachelor's degree in political science in 1982. She was commissioned through the university's Army Reserve Officers' Training Corps program, and subsequently joined the Army's Military Intelligence Corps. She says that she originally intended to serve four years, and then find work in the United States Intelligence Community or the Foreign Service. Her subsequent military education includes the United States Army Command and General Staff College and the United States Army War College, where she received master's degrees in Military Science and Strategy, respectively.

Legere rose up through the ranks, serving in a number of intelligence command positions. From 1991 to 2001, She was the Commander of the 312th Military Intelligence Battalion and from 2002 to 2004, she was the Commander of the 501st Military Intelligence Brigade after which she served in a variety of positions in South Korea until 2008. From 2008 to 2009, then-Brigadier General Legere served as the Deputy Chief of Staff for Intelligence of the Multi-National Force – Iraq. From 2009 to 2012, then-Major General Legere served as the Commander of the United States Army Intelligence and Security Command (the army's contribution to the United States Intelligence Community).

On 12 April 2012, Legere was promoted to lieutenant general and became the Deputy Chief of Staff for Intelligence (G-2) of the United States Army. However, her time as G-2 was marked by controversy when she ordered the rescindment and rewriting of a report that criticized the army's DCGS intelligence analysis system and instead pushed for the procurement of a privately produced alternative system.

In May 2014 Legere was reportedly the top contender to head the Defense Intelligence Agency, the main spy organization for the United States military. If nominated and confirmed, she would have been the first woman to head the agency. She did not, however, receive the position. Legere retired in 2017 and joined Accenture Federal Services as the managing director for national and defense intelligence. She also serves as an Advisor of the nonprofit Military Cyber Professionals Association (MCPA).

Military offices
| Preceded by Richard P. Zahner | Deputy Chief of Staff for Intelligence of the United States Army; 2012–2016 | Succeeded by Robert P. Ashley Jr. |
