= Joseph Ryan (general) =

American military officer

Joseph A. Ryan
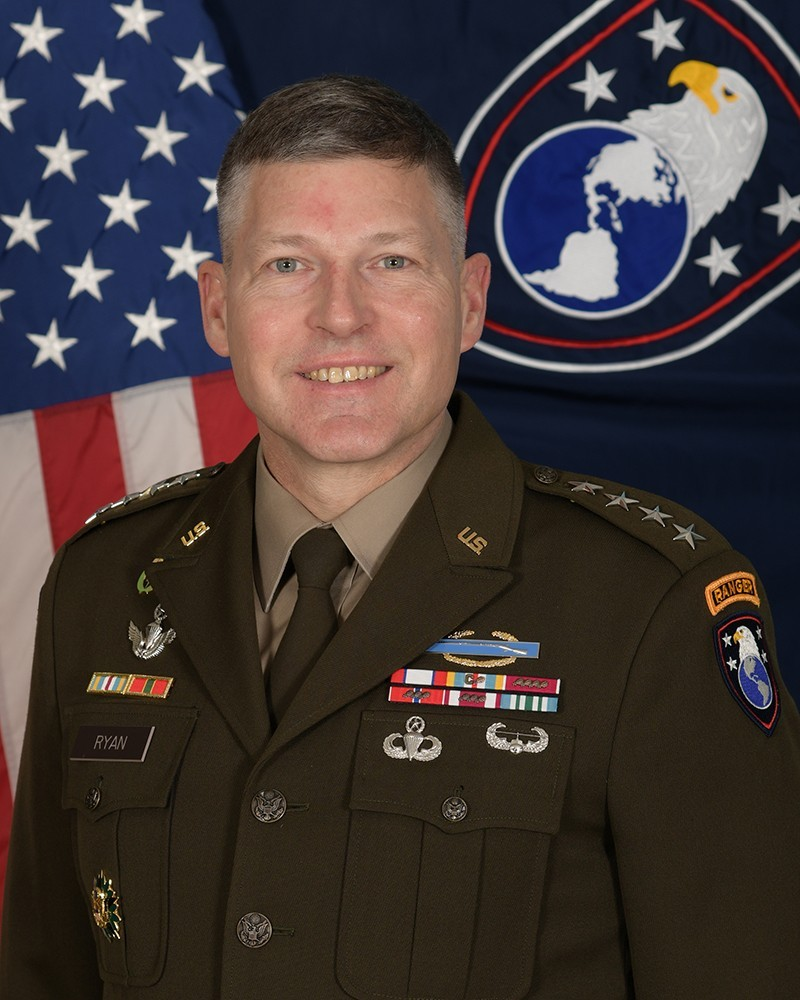
- Official portrait, 2025
- Born: 1968 or 1969 (age 56–57); Pearl River, New York, U.S.
- Education: United States Military Academy (BS); Webster University (MS)
- Military career
- Allegiance: United States
- Branch: United States Army
- Service years: 1991–present
- Rank: General
- Commands: U.S. Army Western Hemisphere Command; 25th Infantry Division; 2nd Brigade Combat Team, 82nd Airborne Division; 1st Battalion, 327th Infantry Regiment
- Conflicts: War in Afghanistan; 2001 invasion of Afghanistan; Iraq War; 2003 invasion of Iraq
- Awards: Army Distinguished Service Medal; Defense Superior Service Medal; Legion of Merit; Bronze Star Medal

Joseph Andrew Ryan (born 1968/1969) is an American general who has served as the commanding general of the United States Army Western Hemisphere Command since 2025.

Ryan was born in Pearl River, New York. He graduated from the United States Military Academy in 1991 and was commissioned as an Army Infantry officer. After serving in infantry and airborne infantry units in the United States and Europe, he became a member of the 75th Ranger Regiment. He had multiple combat deployments in Afghanistan and Iraq while serving in the regiment, including during the 2001 invasion of Afghanistan and the 2003 invasion of Iraq.

Ryan later served as deputy commanding general for support of the 4th Infantry Division, chief of staff of the XVIII Airborne Corps, and concurrently as deputy commanding general and deputy chief of staff for operations of U.S. Forces–Afghanistan and the NATO Resolute Support Mission. His notable commands included the 1st Battalion, 327th Infantry Regiment, from 2009 to 2010; the 2nd Brigade Combat Team, 82nd Airborne Division, from 2014 to 2016; and the 25th Infantry Division from 2021 to 2023.

From 2023, he served as the assistant deputy chief of staff, and from 2024, as the deputy chief of staff, for operations, plans, and training of the Army. In 2025 he became the first commanding general of the newly formed Army Western Hemisphere Command.

== Early life and education ==
Joseph Andrew Ryan was born in Pearl River, New York, c. 1968 or 1969. Ryan attended Pearl River High School. He graduated from the United States Military Academy in 1991 with a Bachelor of Science degree in Engineering Physics and was commissioned as an Army Infantry officer. He later received a master's degree in business management from Webster University. His further military education included the US Army's Infantry Officer Basic and Advanced Courses, the Army Command and General Staff College, and the Army War College.

== Army career ==
In 1992, Ryan served as a paratrooper in the 3rd Battalion, 505th Parachute Infantry Regiment, 82nd Airborne Division at Fort Bragg. From 1996 to 1998, he served in the 1st Battalion, 6th Infantry Regiment, 2nd Brigade, 1st Armored Division in Germany. While there, he commanded C Company from 1997 to 1998. Ryan then served in the 1st Ranger Battalion, 75th Ranger Regiment, from 1999 to 2002, which included command of A Company from 2000 to 2002. In the latter role, he was deployed for the invasion of Afghanistan from 2001 to 2002. After attending the Army Command and General Staff College in 2002, he returned to his previous unit as the battalion S3 officer and took part in the invasion of Iraq from 2003 to 2004. Ryan had another deployment to Afghanistan from 2004 to 2005 before returning to Iraq from 2005 to 2006.

Ryan was the S3 officer of the 75th Ranger Regiment at Fort Benning from 2006 to 2008, and had a deployment to Afghanistan in 2007. He served as the regiment's deputy commander in 2008. From 2009 to 2010, Ryan was the commander of the 1st Battalion, 327th Infantry Regiment, 1st Brigade Combat Team, 101st Airborne Division at Fort Campbell. In 2010 they were deployed to Afghanistan. Ryan was later a fellow at Columbia University and graduated from the Army War College. In June 2014, he took command of the 2nd Brigade Combat Team, 82nd Airborne Division at Fort Bragg. Ryan remained its commander until June 2016.

From August 2018 to July 2019, Ryan served as the deputy commanding general (support) of the 4th Infantry Division at Fort Carson, during which time he had a deployment to Afghanistan. He was then the chief of staff of the XVIII Airborne Corps from August 2019 to February 2021. From then until June 2021, Ryan concurrently served as Deputy Chief of Staff, Operations, NATO Resolute Support Mission; Deputy Commanding General (Operations), United States Forces–Afghanistan; and Commander, United States National Support Element Command–Afghanistan. He later served as the as the commanding general of the 25th Infantry Division from July 2021 to August 2023, and then assistant deputy chief of staff for operations, plans, and training from September 2023 to October 2024.

In July 2024, Ryan was nominated for promotion to lieutenant general and assignment as the deputy chief of staff for operations, plans, and training. He served in that role from November 2024 to November 2025. In October 2025, Ryan was nominated for promotion to general and assignment as the commanding general of the U.S. Army Western Hemisphere Command. He became the first commanding general of the new command on 5 December 2025.

== Awards and decorations ==
Ryan was awarded the following decorations during his military career.

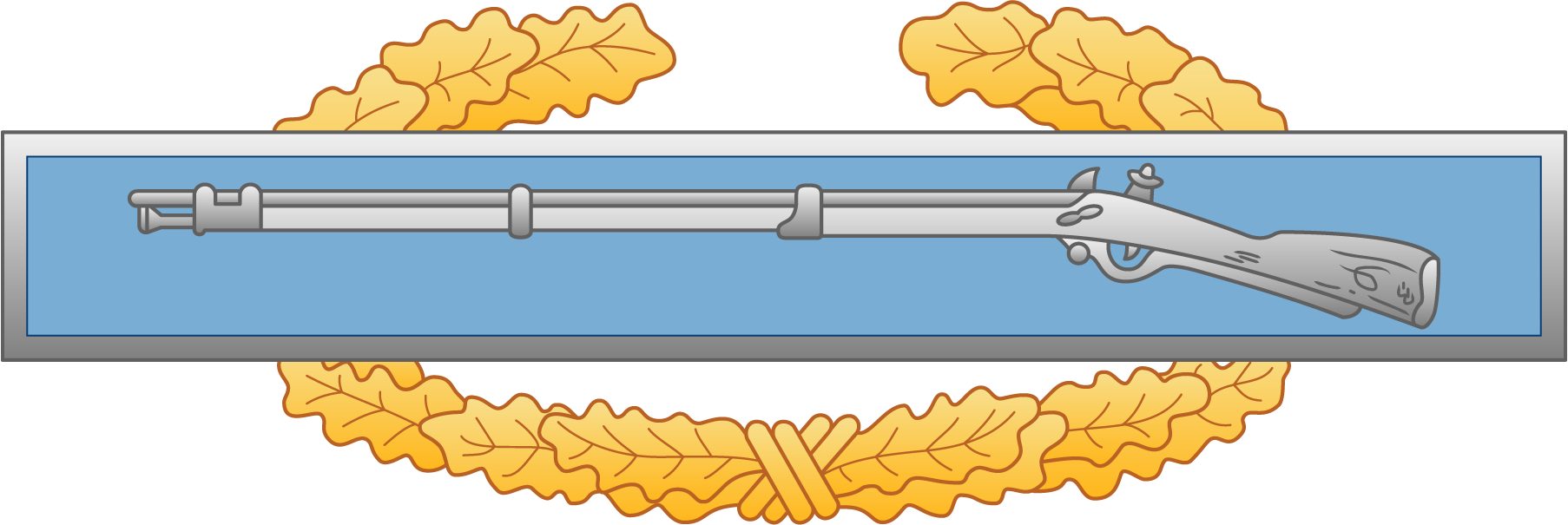

Badge	MasterCombat Infantryman Badge		
1st row	Army Distinguished Service Medal	Defense Superior Service Medal with "C" device and Oak leaf cluster	Legion of Merit with 4 Oak leaf clusters
2nd row	Bronze Star with 4 Oak leaf clusters	Meritorious Service Medal with 3 bronze Oak leaf clusters	Joint Service Commendation Medal
3rd row	Army Commendation Medal with 2 bronze Oak leaf clusters	Joint Service Achievement Medal	National Defense Service Medal with 1 Service star
4th row	Armed Forces Expeditionary Medal	Afghanistan Campaign Medal with 3 bronze Campaign stars	Iraq Campaign Medal with 3 bronze Campaign stars
5th row	Global War on Terrorism Expeditionary Medal	Global War on Terrorism Service Medal	Armed Forces Service Medal with 1 Service star
6th row	Army Service Ribbon	Army Overseas Service Ribbon	United Nations Medal
7th row	NATO Medal for service with Non-Article 5	Joint Meritorious Unit Award	ArmySuperior Unit Award
Badges	Ranger Tab	Air Assault Badge	Master Parachutist Badge

Other accoutrements
25th Infantry Division Distinctive unit insignia
75th Ranger Regiment
South Korean Master Parachutist Badge
United States Army Western Hemisphere Command Shoulder sleeve insignia
12 Overseas Service Bars

== Dates of promotion ==
Rank	Branch	Date
Second lieutenant	Army	15 May 1991
First lieutenant	Army	
Captain	Army	
Major	Army	26 September 2001
Lieutenant colonel	Army	28 September 2007
Colonel	Army	1 January 2013
Brigadier general	Army	2 May 2019
Major general	Army	2 September 2021
Lieutenant general	Army	4 November 2024
General	Army	5 December 2025

Military offices
Preceded by ???	Deputy Commanding General (Support) of the 4th Infantry Division; 2018–2019	Succeeded by Guillaume Beaurpere
Preceded by James Jarrard	Commanding General of the 25th Infantry Division; 2021–2023	Succeeded by Marcus S. Evans
Preceded by Sean Swindell	Assistant Deputy Chief of Staff for Operations, Plans, and Training of the United States Army; 2023–2024	Succeeded by James P. Isenhower III
Preceded by Patrick Matlock	Deputy Chief of Staff for Operations, Plans, and Training of the United States Army; 2024–2025	Vacant
Command established	Commanding General of the United States Army Western Hemisphere Command; 2025–present	Incumbent
