= Maxie McFarland =

American army officer and senior level political executive (1950–2013)

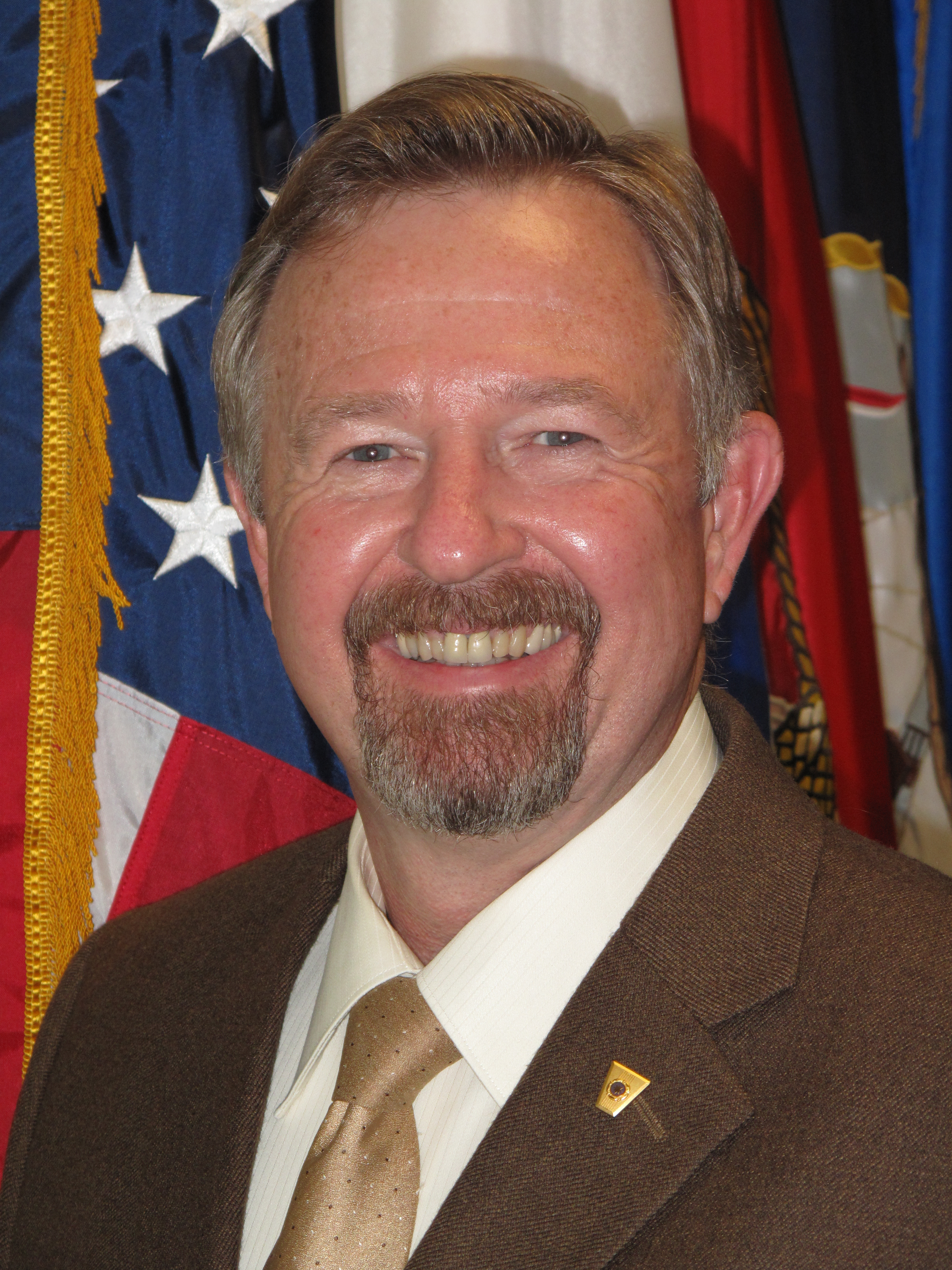
Maxie L. McFarland

Maxie L. McFarland (also known as Maxie MacFarland), was one of thirteen tier-3 US Government Defense Senior Executives, serving as the Deputy Chief of Staff for Intelligence (G–2) for the U.S. Army's Training and Doctrine Command located at Fort Monroe, Virginia. Starting in June 2011, he worked as the Executive Vice President for Strategic Planning for the Sierra Nevada Corporation. Maxie McFarland died on 8 November 2013 and is buried at Arlington National Cemetery. He was inducted into the Military Intelligence Hall of Fame in 2014.

== Civilian career ==
As the TRADOC G-2, McFarland served as the Army's lead for analyzing the characteristics of future military operations and describing the conditions and threats they might contain. This effort supports the development of concepts, education of leaders, design of new capabilities, training or military units and enables experimentation. In coordination with Joint Forces Command, other governmental agencies and services, and the private and academic sectors, TRADOC G-2 develops the operational environment (OE), which is the Army's authoritative perspective of the future. As a function of his work on the Operational Environment, McFarland often took unconventional avenues in order to replicate the complexity and uncertainty of the operational environment that his staff defines. He sponsored a variety of initiatives for the Army and Joint forces, including: the Army Opposing Force Program, the Army Starfish Program, Red Teaming capability, the Army Culture and Foreign Language Strategy, Human Terrain System Foreign Military and Cultural Studies, and the Joint Training Counter-Improvised Explosive Device Operations Integration Center (JTCOIC). Collectively, these programs provide support to deployed forces, coalition partners, the Army's Combat Training Centers, Army educational institutions and schools, as well as various capability development and integration centers.

From December 2005 to May 2007, McFarland was assigned by the Army Chief of Staff to support the establishment and expansion of the Joint Improvised Explosive Device Defeat Organization (JIEDDO). He served as a special advisor to the director and as the deputy director for concepts, strategy and intelligence. In this capacity, McFarland was responsible for initiating JIEDDO's Counter-Improvised Explosive Device Operational Integration Center, establishing the law enforcement support program, and overseeing the development of Intelligence, Surveillance, and Reconnaissance capabilities to counter improvised explosive device threats as well as numerous other initiatives.

== Education ==
Maxie Lawrence McFarland was born on 5 August 1950. He earned a Bachelor of Science Degree in Business from the University of Tennessee at Chattanooga in 1973, a Master of Education Degree in Psychology and Counseling from Southern Arkansas University in 1985, and a Master of Arts Degree in Strategy and Policy from the Naval War College in 1995. In addition, McFarland completed the following military training programs: Signal Officers Basic Course, Infantry Officers Advance Course, Counter-Intelligence Officers Course, Command and General Staff college, Electronic Warfare/Signals Intelligence Course.

== Military career ==
Following his college graduation, McFarland joined the Army in 1973 and was commissioned as Second Lieutenant in the Signal Corps. In 1975 he branch transferred to the infantry and served as an Infantry Officer until his branch transfer to Military Intelligence in 1985. Throughout his active duty career, he served in a wide variety of operational and intelligence-related command and staff positions, both in the United States and overseas. He has twice served as a battalion commander and completed four tours as a G2 at the Division through Army level. He retired from active duty as a Colonel after serving for more than 25 years and shortly thereafter was selected for the Defense Intelligence Senior Executive Service in July 2002.

== Summary of career ==
- 1973–1975: Officer in the Signal Corps
- 1975–1985: Infantry Officer
- 1985–1991: Military Intelligence Officer
- 1991–1993: Commander, 312th Military Intelligence Battalion
- 1993–1994: Senior Intelligence Officer (G2) for the 2nd Armor Division
- 1995–1999: Senior Intelligence Officer (G2) for the V Corps
- 1999–2002: Deputy Chief of Staff for Intelligence (G–2) for the TRADOC
- 2002–2011: Defense Intelligence Senior Executive (G–2) for the TRADOC
- 2005–2007: Deputy Director for Concepts, Strategy and Intelligence for the JIEDDO
- 2011–2013: Executive Vice President for Strategic Planning for the Sierra Nevada Corporation

== Conferences ==
McFarland participated in specialized conferences, including:

- "2009 Intelligence Warfighting Summit"; McFarland's report entitled as "Operational Environment – Co-Creation of Understanding"
- "Intelligence, Surveillance & Reconnaissance Conference 2011"; McFarland's report entitled as "ISR on the Battlefield"

== Publications ==
McFarland authored several works, including:

- "Military Intelligence Gunnery" (1994)
- Opposing Force Doctrinal Framework and Strategy (2003)
- "Military Cultural Education" (2005)
- "A Center for Learning Innovation" (2010)
- "Concluding Remarks about Environmental and Human Security and the Role of U.S. Military Forces in Africa in the Future" (2010)

== Awards and honors ==
His personal and unit awards and decorations include the Presidential Rank Award for Meritorious Executive (2006), the Defense Distinguished Service Medal (2002), two Legion of Merit awards (1995, 1997), three Meritorious Service Medal awards (1992, 1994, 1996), the Army Commendation Medal, the Army Achievement Medal, Army of Occupation Medal, National Defense Service Medal, Southwest Asia Service Medal, Kuwait Liberation Medal, NATO Medal, Army Service Ribbon, four Overseas Service Ribbons and the Military Parachutist Badge.
