= Army Air Traffic Services Command =

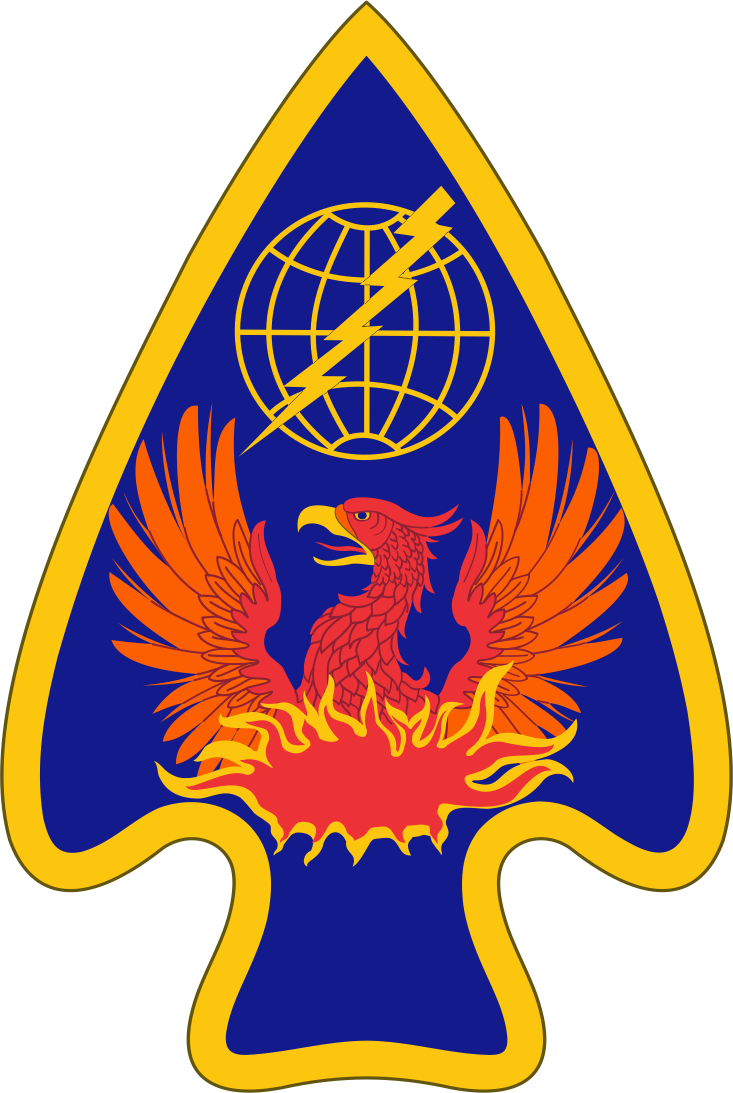
- Active: 1956-present
- Country: United States
- Branch: United States Army
- Role: Air Traffic Control
- Size: Command
- Part of: United States Army Western Hemisphere Command
- Garrison/HQ: Fort Rucker, Alabama
- Motto: Freedom's Voice
- Website: https://home.army.mil/rucker/tenants/atscom

Commanders
- Current commander: COL Richard A. Polen
- Command Sergeant Major: CSM Nicholas Burney

Insignia
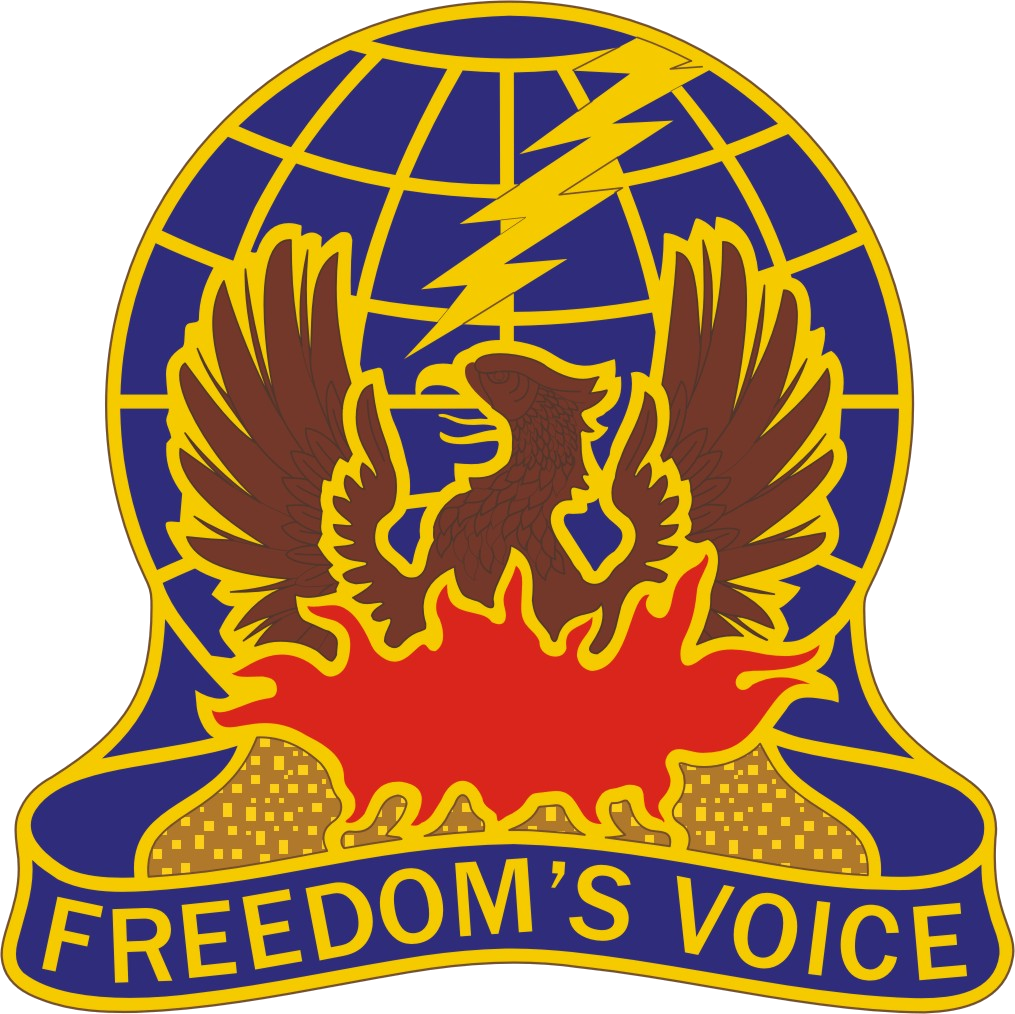
- US Army Air Traffic Services Command DUI

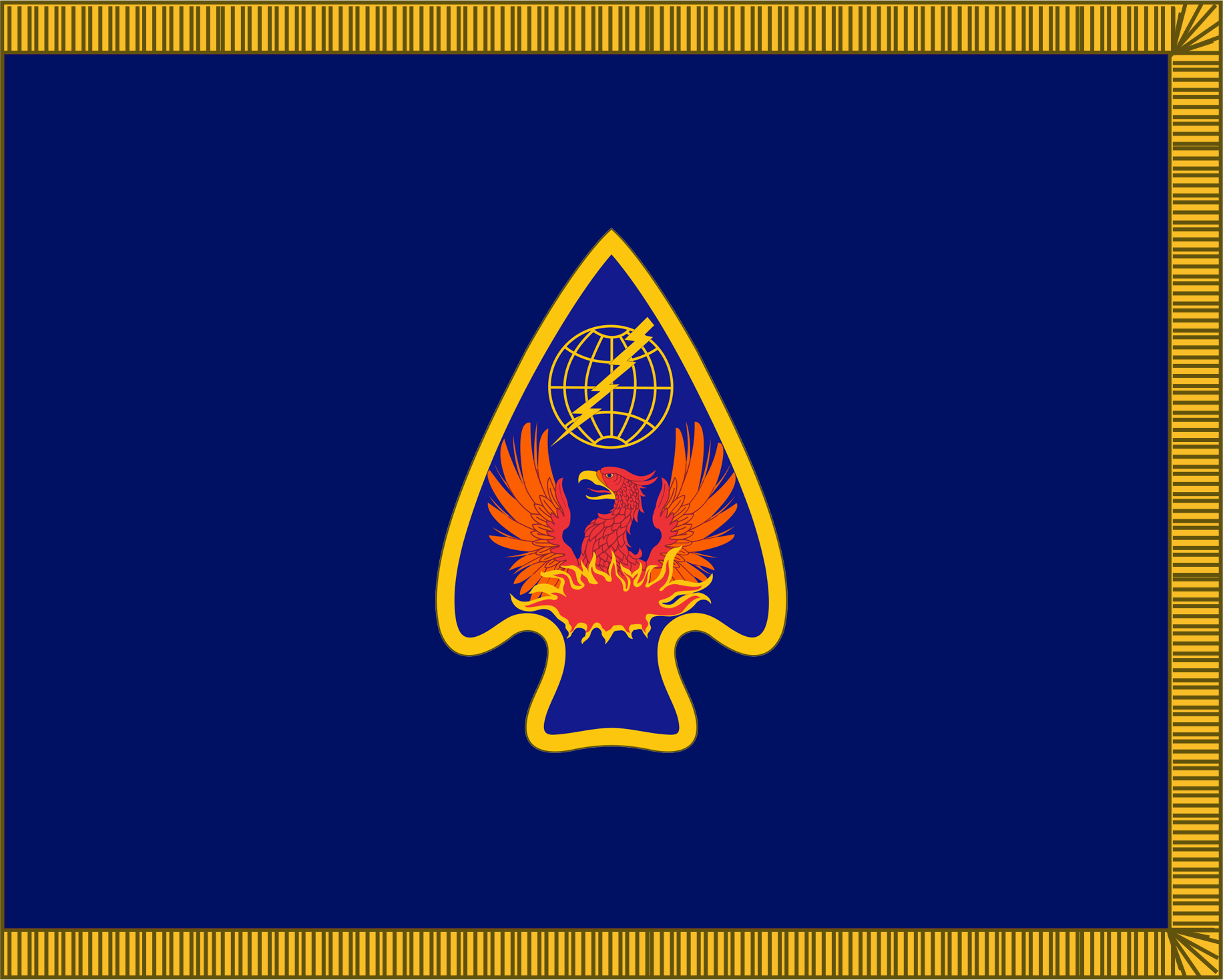
- Air Traffic Services Command Flag

Aircraft flown
- C-12D Huron C-12S Huron

The Army Air Traffic Services Command (ATSCOM) is a unit of the US Army that provides airspace and air traffic support to army bases and other commands globally. The command certifies air traffic controllers for the service, inspects airfields, ensures safe aircraft operations in installation air space as well as civilian air space at home and internationally.

The unit began in 1956 as the Army Aviation Operation Detachment (AAOD) under the Continental Army Command (CONARC) to assist aviation units to operate at night and in bad weather conditions. United States Army Air Traffic Control Activity (USAATCA) grew during the Vietnam War as army aviation grew to meet the needs of the fighting force and was based at Fort Huachuca, Arizona.

In 1986, USAATCA was moved to Fort Rucker, Alabama. In August of 1990 the Army needed better air traffic control in Saudi Arabia due to the buildup for Operation Desert Storm and USAATCA sent the 256th Signal Support Company to inspect all air traffic control sites in the region. As USAATCA improved Army ATC sites, they also needed to cooperate with U.S. Air Force Tactical Air Control Center (TACC) as operations increased.

In 1995 the Vice Chief of Staff approved of a separate command for air traffic services. In 2003, ATSCOM was officially created.

The command flies the C-12S Hurons from Beechcraft for air field flight inspection and calibration missions.

On December 5, 2025 was moved under the command of the United States Army Western Hemisphere Command as part of a larger reorganization of the US Army.

== Subordinate Units ==
164th Theater Airfield Operations Group (TAOG)

- Headquarters & Headquarters Company, at Cairns Army Airfield, Fort Rucker, Alabama
- 597th Operations Division
- 1st Battalion, 58th Aviation Regiment, at Cairns Army Airfield, Fort Rucker, Alabama
  - Headquarters & Headquarters Company (HHC), at Fort Rucker, Alabama
  - C Company, 58th Aviation Regiment, at Fort Campbell, Kentucky
  - D Company, 58th Aviation Regiment, at Fort Hood, Texas
  - F Company, 58th Aviation Regiment, at Fort Bliss, Texas
- Eighth Army (Operationally)
  - G Company, 58th Aviation Regiment, at Camp Humphreys, South Korea
