= 470th Military Intelligence Brigade (United States) =

American military intelligence unit

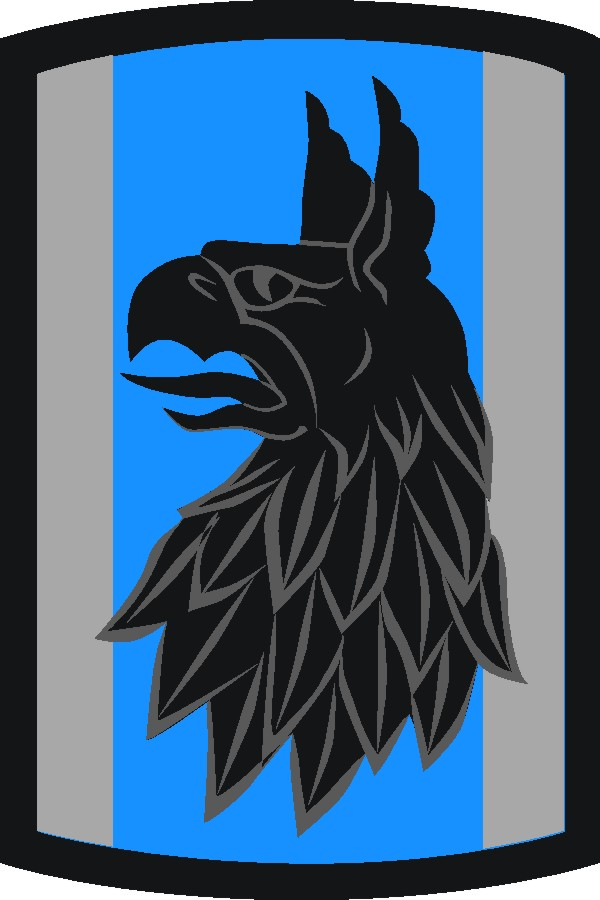
- 470th Military Intelligence Brigade shoulder sleeve insignia
- Active: 1987–1997 c.2003–present
- Country: United States
- Allegiance: United States Army Intelligence and Security Command
- Branch: United States Army
- Type: Military Intelligence
- Size: Brigade
- Part of: United States Army Western Hemisphere Command
- Garrison/HQ: Fort Sam Houston

Commanders
- Current commander: Colonel Patrick J. Miller

Insignia
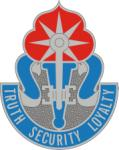
- Distinctive Unit Insignia

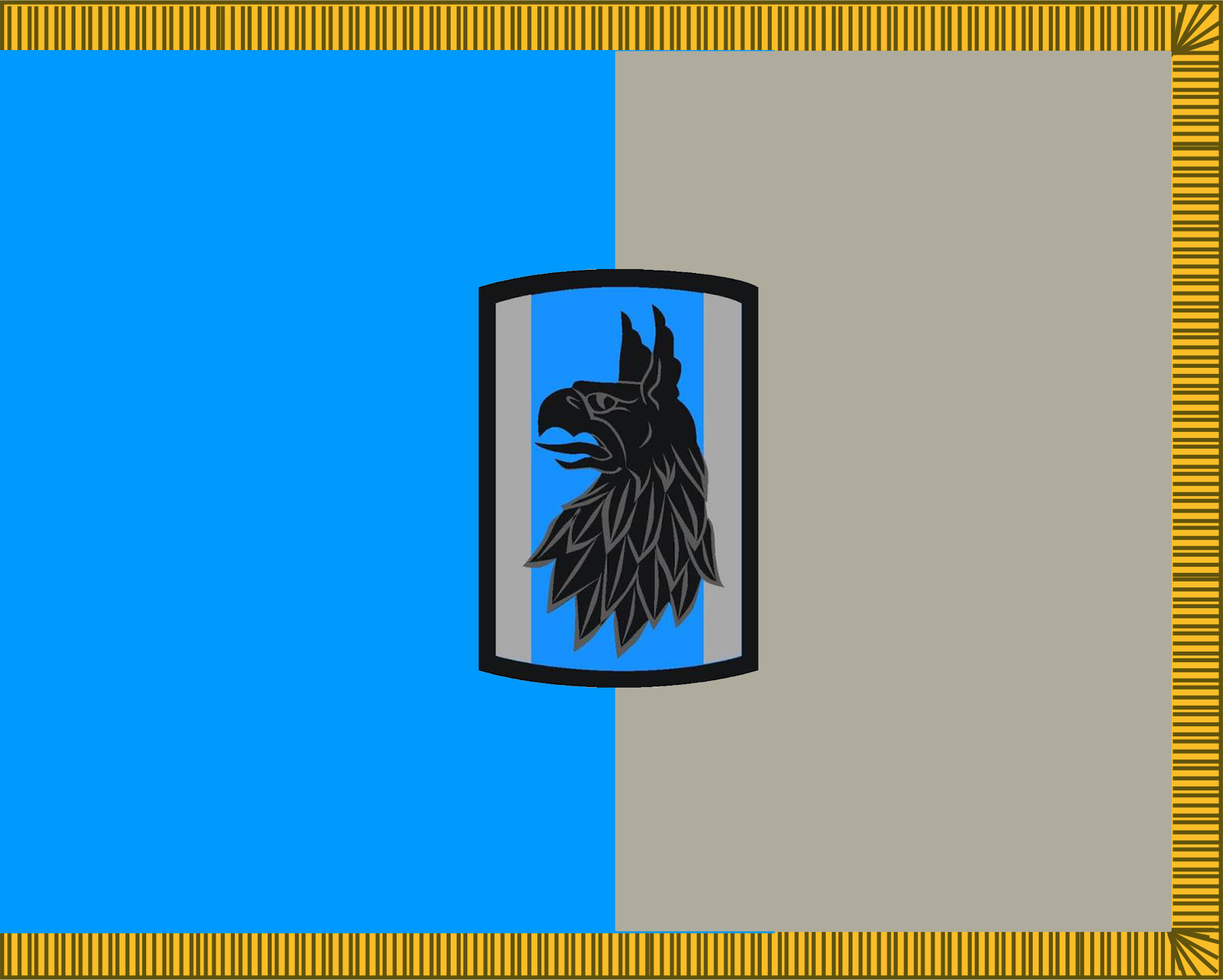
- 470th Military Intelligence Brigade Flag

The 470th Military Intelligence Brigade is a unit of the United States Army and subordinate to the U.S. Army Intelligence and Security Command. Its mission is to provide tailored, multi-disciplined intelligence and counter-intelligence in support of the US Army Western Hemisphere Command and United States Southern Command (USSOUTHCOM). The 470th is headquartered at Fort Sam Houston, Texas with subordinate battalions located in Texas and Florida. Elements of the 470th have participated in Operation Just Cause (when formerly based in Panama) and have deployed in support of Operation Iraqi Freedom and Operation Enduring Freedom.

== History ==
- Constituted 12 July 1944 in the Army of the United States as the 470th Counter Intelligence Corps Detachment.
- Activated 31 July 1944 at Quarry Heights in the Canal Zone.
- Allotted 19 October 1951 to the Regular Army.
- Redesignated 25 July 1961 as the 470th Intelligence Corps Detachment.
- Reorganized and redesignated 14 September 1964 as the 470th Intelligence Corps Group.
- Redesignated 15 October 1966 as the 470th Military Intelligence Group.
- Reorganized and redesignated 16 October 1987 as Headquarters and Headquarters Company, 470th Military Intelligence Brigade.
- Reorganized and redesignated 16 October 1991 as Headquarters and Headquarters Detachment, 470th Military Intelligence Brigade.
- Inactivated 15 October 1997 in Panama.
- Redesignated 28 February 2002 as Headquarters and Headquarters Detachment, 470th Military Intelligence Group.
- Activated 16 October 2002 in Puerto Rico.
- Reactivated 22 August 2003 in Fort Sam Houston, Texas.
- Group subsequently redesignated as a brigade.
- 201st MI Battalion activated on April 12, 2006, as a unit specializing in interrogation.
- 201st MI Battalion deployed to Iraq (Camp Cropper); September 2007 to December 2009
- 14th MI Battalion activated on 15 October 2008 and deployed to Camp Cropper, Iraq during 2009–2010.
- 314th MI Battalion redesignated in 2009 as 717th MI Battalion.
- 201st MI Battalion deployed to Afghanistan during 2010–2011.
- 206th and 306th MI Battalions subordinated to the 470th MI Brigade on April 29, 2011.
- 14th MI Battalion deployed to Afghanistan during 2011–2012.
- 14th MI Battalion Inactivated on 14 June 2013.
- 201st MI Battalion deployed to Afghanistan during 2012–2013.

== Structure ==
470th Military Intelligence Brigade

- Headquarters & Headquarters Company
- 312th Military Intelligence Battalion
- 717th Military Intelligence Battalion
- 377th Military Intelligence Battalion (Army Reserve)
