= 111th Explosive Ordnance Group =

111th Explosive Ordnance Group (EOD)
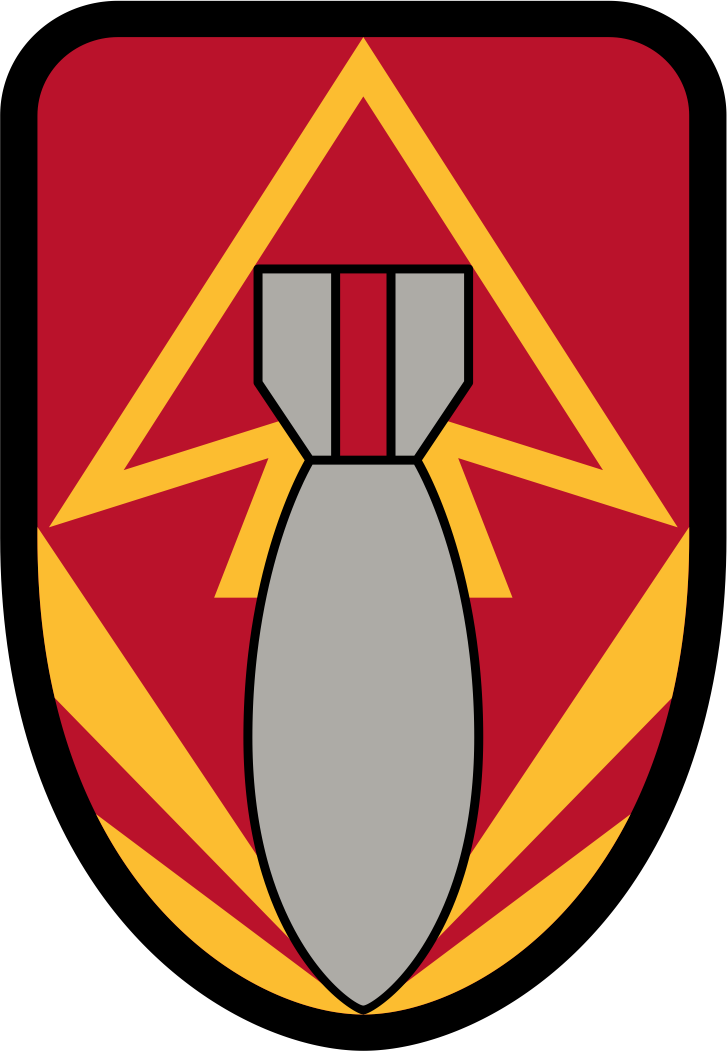
- Active: 1981 - present
- Country: United States
- Allegiance: Alabama Army National Guard
- Branch: United States Army National Guard
- Type: Explosive Ordnance
- Role: Disposal
- Size: Group (Brigade)
- Part of: 167th Theater Sustainment Command
- Garrison/HQ: Opelika Armory, Alabama
- Decorations: Meritorious Unit Commendation

Insignia
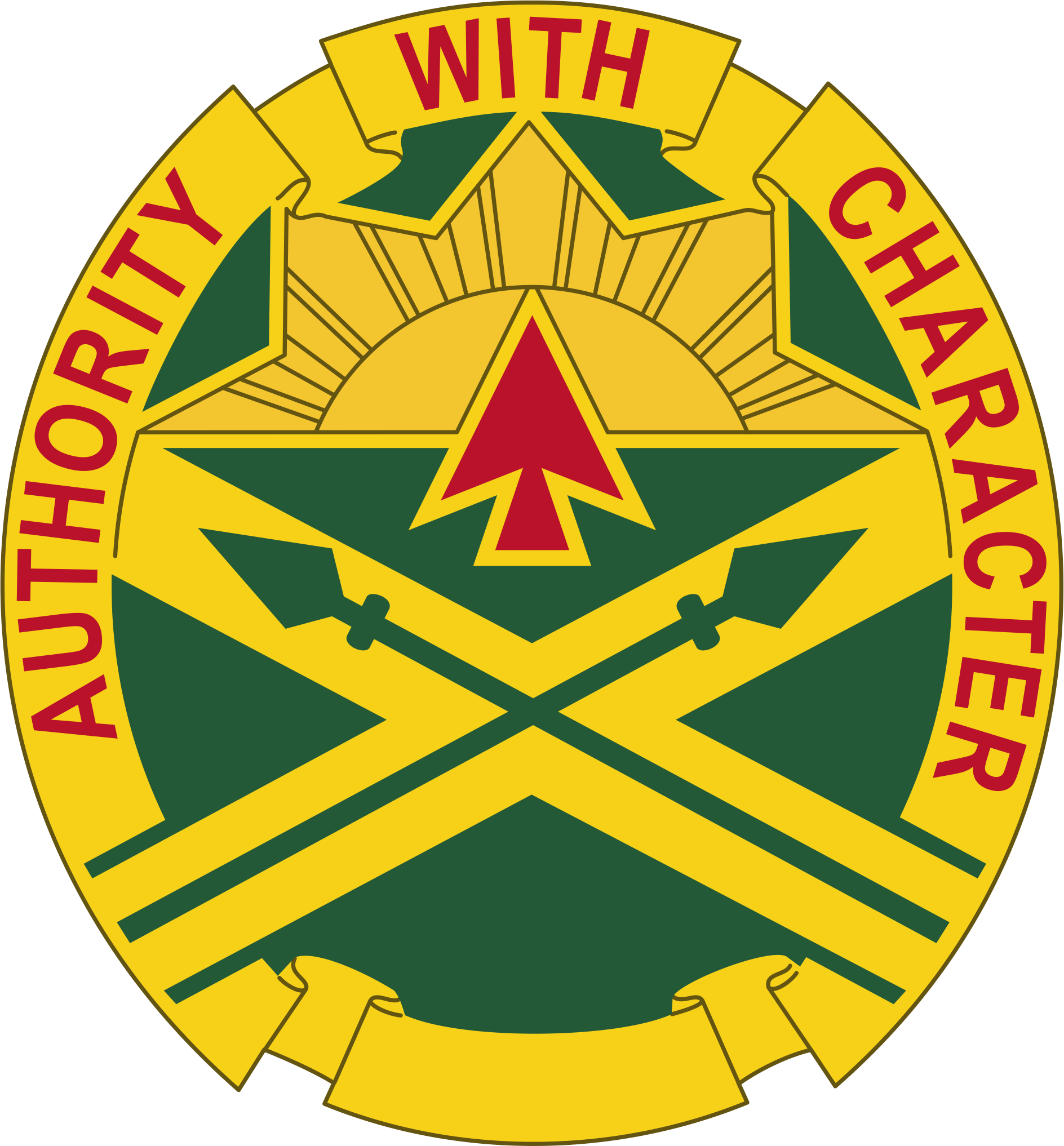
- 111th Explosive Ordnance Group DUI

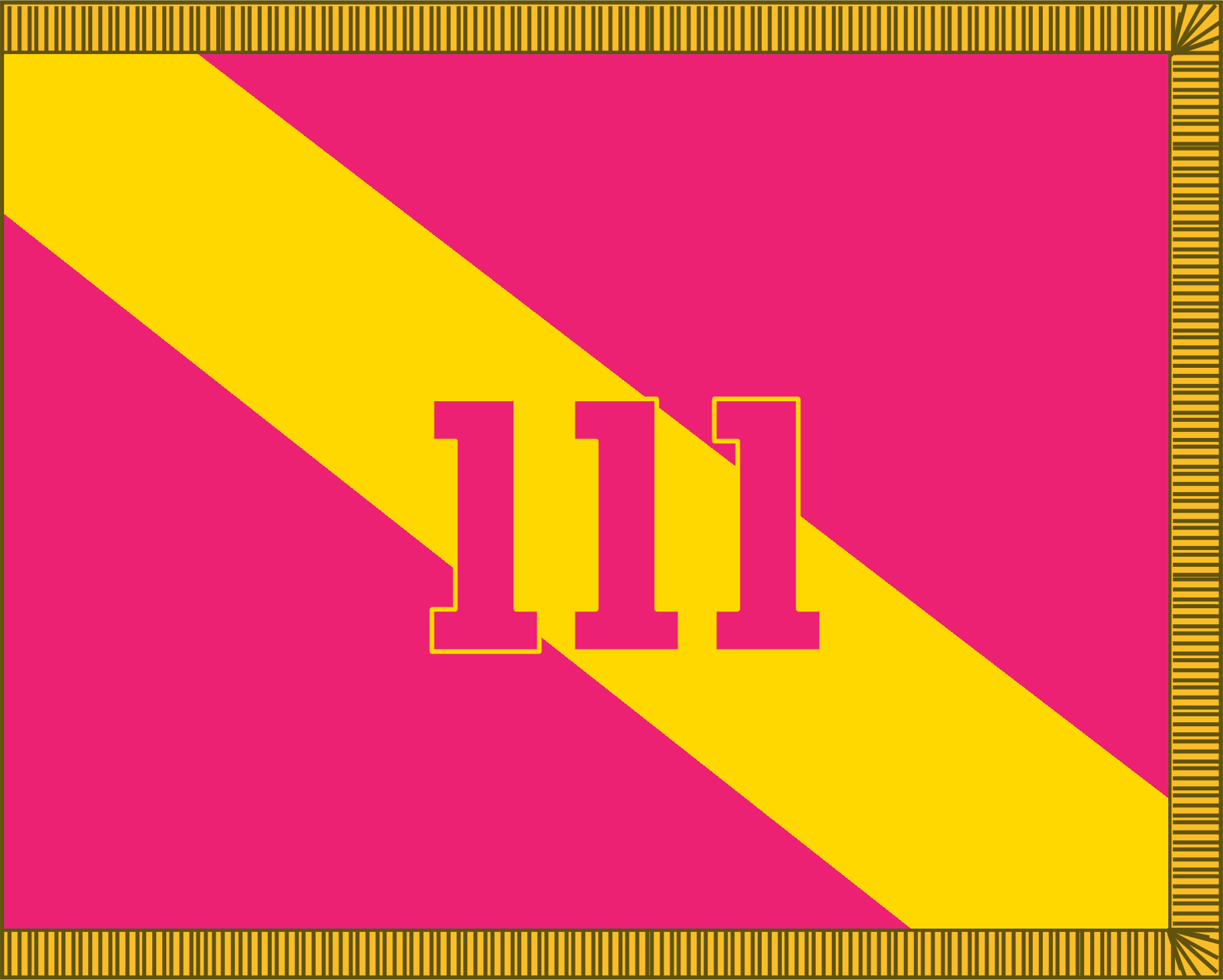
- 111th Ordnance Group Flag

The 111th Explosive Ordnance Group (Explosive Ordnance Disposal) is a unit in the US Army National Guard since September 1981. The Group was deployed to Kuwait in 1991 and Afghanistan in 2004 and Iraq in 2010.

== Subordinate units ==
- Headquarters and Headquarters Detachment at Opelika Armory, Alabama
- 441st Explosive Ordnance Disposal Ordnance Battalion
- 731st Combat Sustainment Support Battalion
- 1103rd Combat Sustainment Support Battalion
- 1200th Combat Sustainment Support Battalion
- 1307th Explosive Hazard Coordination Center

== Campaign participation ==
- Southwest Asia
  - Liberation and Defense of Kuwait
  - Cease-Fire
- War on Terrorism
  - War on Terrorism Campaign

== Decorations ==
- Meritorious Unit Commendation (Army), Streamer embroidered - Southwest Asia 1991
