= 279th Army Field Support Brigade =

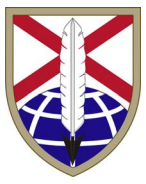
- Active: 2008 - present
- Country: United States
- Allegiance: Alabama Army National Guard
- Branch: United States Army National Guard
- Role: Field Support
- Size: Brigade
- Part of: 167th Theater Sustainment Command
- Garrison/HQ: Huntsville, Alabama
- Motto: Integrity Always
- Website: https://www.aschq.army.mil/Units/279th/

Commanders
- Current commander: Col. Christopher Johnson
- Command Sergeant Major: CSM Roy M. Sosebee, Jr.

Insignia
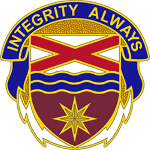
- 279th Army Field Support Brigade DUI

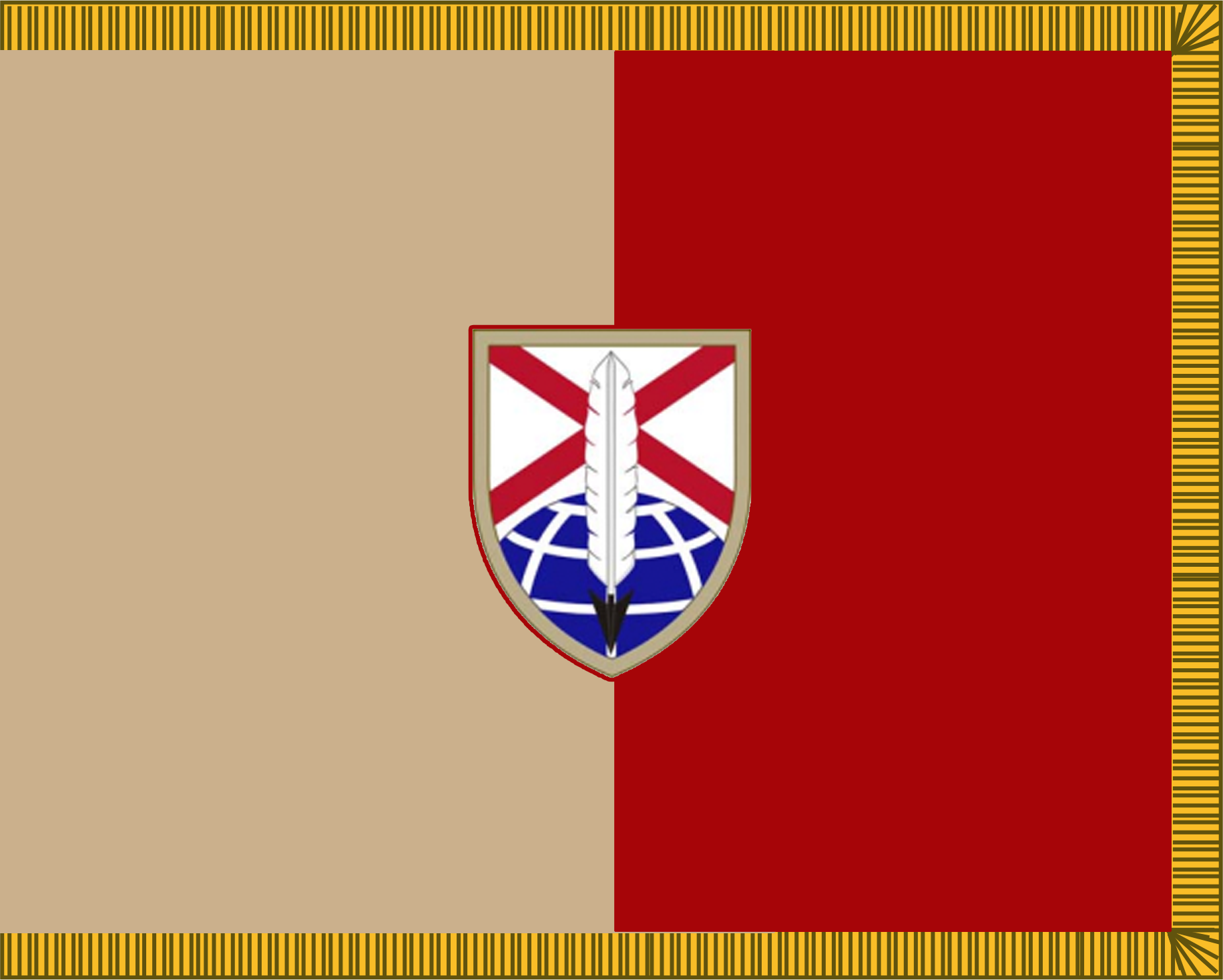
- 279th Support Brigade Flag

The 279th Army Field Support Brigade is a unit of the Alabama Army National Guard since 2008 when the 151st Combat Engineer Battalion and the 279th Antiaircraft Automatic Weapons Battalion were merged to create the 279th Signal Battalion in 1959. The units predecessor units served in Alaska in World War II and in Korea. The 279th Signal served during the Berlin Crisis in 1961. On September 1, 2008, the unit was redesignated as a Brigade.

Subordinate units of the brigade deployed to Bagram airfield in Afghanistan in 2009 and 2010 and to Kandahar airfield in 2012.

The mission of the unit is to support US NORTHCOM providing logistics support to whatever mission they are given.

== Subordinate Units ==
- 1169th Contracting Battalion
- 1960th Contingency Contracting Team
