= Bad Aibling Station =

Monitoring base of the US intelligence organization NSA

- Part of the BND
- Located in Bad Aibling, Bavaria, Germany
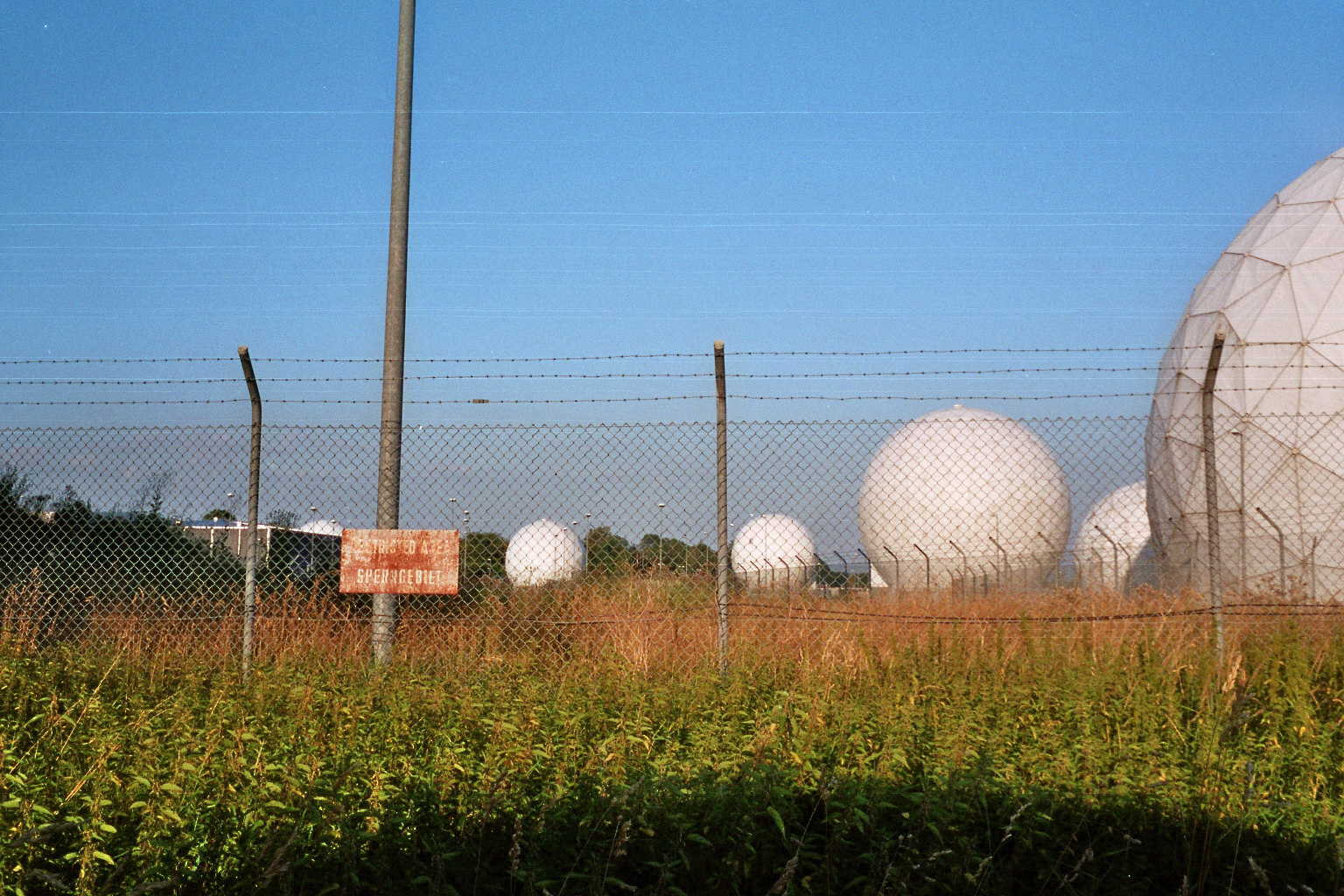
- Radomes of Bad Aibling Station

Site information
- Type: Signals and data gathering
- Owner: BND
- Open to the public: no
- Condition: dismantled, relocated

Location
- Location within Bavaria Location within Germany
- Coordinates: 47.879444°N 11.984444°E
- Height: 492 m (1614 ft)

Site history
- Built: 1936/1952
- In use: 1952–2004
- Demolished: 2004

The Bad Aibling Station (BAS), also known as the 18th United States Army Security Agency Field Station, Field station 81, and Hortensie III is a satellite tracking station operated by the German SIGINT agency BND from nearby Mangfall Barracks in Bad Aibling, Bavaria.

Created by the Western Allies in 1947, it had been operated by the U.S. National Security Agency (NSA) until the early 2000s as operations have been transferred to the BND at Bad Aibling Station closure.

As part of the global surveillance network ECHELON, Bad Aibling used to be one of the larger listening posts outside the USA and equalled its counterparts RAF Menwith Hill (UK), the Joint Defence Facility Pine Gap (AUS) and CFS Leitrim (CDN).

== History ==
In 1936 a military airfield was established by the German National Socialist government at the site of a sport airfield in Bad Aibling-Mietraching. After the Second World War, troops of the United States Army seized the military airport ("Fliegerhorst" and flight training base) that had evolved from the airfield. Initially, it was used by the occupying Americans as a camp for prisoners of war. Günter Grass and Joseph Ratzinger, later Pope Benedict XVI, are claimed to have met there as prisoners.

After the last prisoners had been discharged in 1946, the grounds of the airbase were transformed into a displaced persons camp for former members of the Royal Yugoslav Army who had been deported to Germany during the war. The Bad Aibling DP camp was first run by UNRRA and later by the IRO. In 1948, the Yugoslav DPs were transferred to another DP camp in Munich, making room for a new relief project: the IRO Children's Village Bad Aibling, which housed over 2,300 unaccompanied children and youth who had been displaced during or as a result of the war, and who represented more than 20 nationalities. An international team of relief workers, including a group of Quakers from the AFSC, took care of the children until the Village was closed in late 1951.

In 1952, the area was taken over by the US Army. Since a four-power agreement enacted Austria's neutrality in 1955, US listening devices that were situated there had to be abandoned. They were relocated to Bad Aibling and during the Cold War field station 81 was converted by the United States Army Security Agency ("ASA") to a central communications monitoring station for American intelligence.

In 1971 the National Security Agency (NSA) and the United States Department of Defense took over command from the U.S. Army. Simultaneously, the Army Security Agency transferred most of its activities in West Germany from its field stations located at Rothwesten, Bad Aibling and Herzogenaurach to Augsburg.

In 1994, the NSA transferred command of its Bad Aibling base to INSCOM, one of the Central Security Services of the United States.

After the end of the Cold War, on several occasions including investigations of the European Parliament that censured industrial espionage by American secret services, the Americans intended to close the Bad Aibling Station. The September 11, 2001 attacks delayed these plans.

Restructuring of the US intelligence community after September 11, 2001, caused the closure of Bad Aibling Station in September 2004. The base was transferred back to the Federal Republic of Germany. Information uncovered by Der Spiegel in 2013 from the Edward Snowden leaks indicated that the NSA continued its presence at Bad Aibling until 2006, supported by the BND, by using equipment in a metal-clad building known as "Tin Can".

In the direct vicinity of Bad Aibling, a Bundesnachrichtendienst (BND) annex is located within the area of the Bundeswehr barracks.

== Institutions (as known) ==
- TASCOM, APO 09108 / 09098 - Carl Mosher 1972 & 1973
- 718th Military Intelligence Brigade
- 66th Military Intelligence Group, (relocated from Augsburg)
- USAF 402nd Intelligence Squadron
- Naval Security Group Activity
- 18th USASA Field Station
- 328th Communications Reconnaissance (ASA) Company 1955
- 312th Communications Reconnaissance Battalion (1955-1956)
- 312th Army Security Agency Battalion (1956-1957)
- 320th USASA Battalion 1957-

== Significance for secret services ==
The Bad Aibling Station was important in the ECHELON System (RSOC, Regional SIGINT Operation Center) employing appx 500 staff. Its supposed task was data interception for US and other allied intelligence services. The López affair that was cleared up by telephone surveillance in the BAS gained worldwide audience.

Officially its function has been "Rapid Radio Relay and Secure Common, Support to DoD and Unified Commands, Medium and Longhand Common HF & Satellite, Communication Physics Research, Test and Evaluate Common Equipment"

Only few details are known. Serious hints, however, support the assumption that the BAS supervised numerous communication channels, including wireless communication, telephony and internet traffic. Particularly the communication with satellites, also outside the Intelsat system, seems to have been monitored by the BAS.

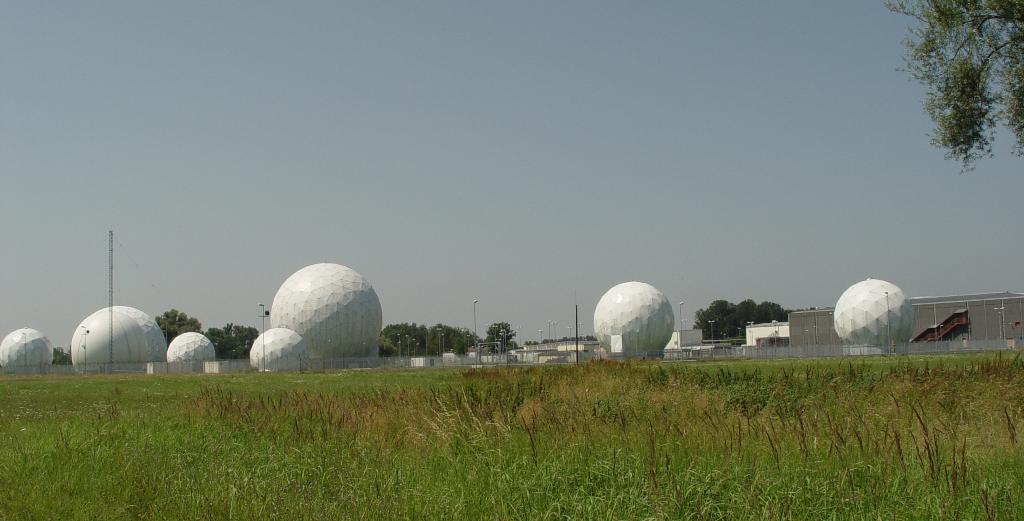
Field Station 81

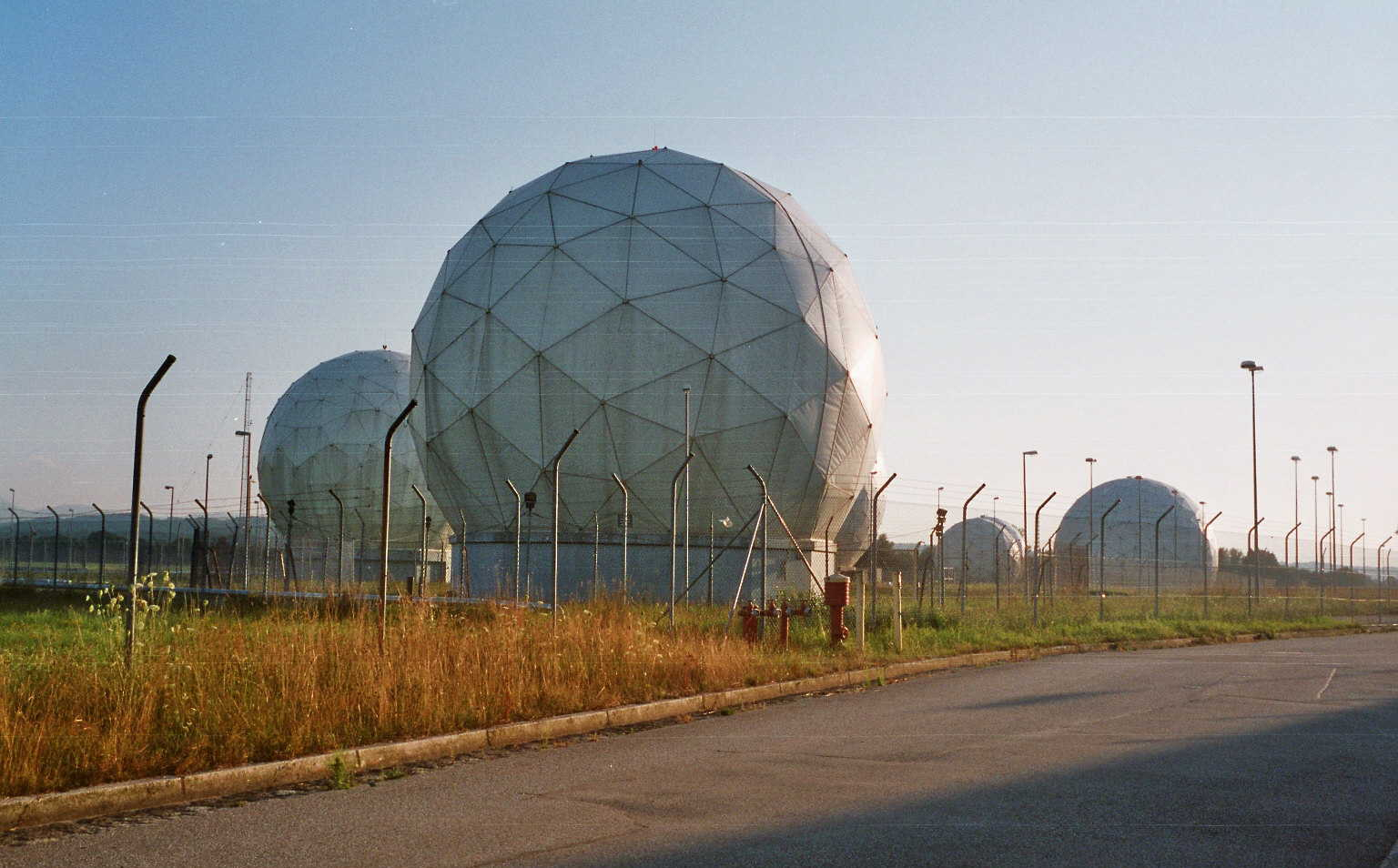

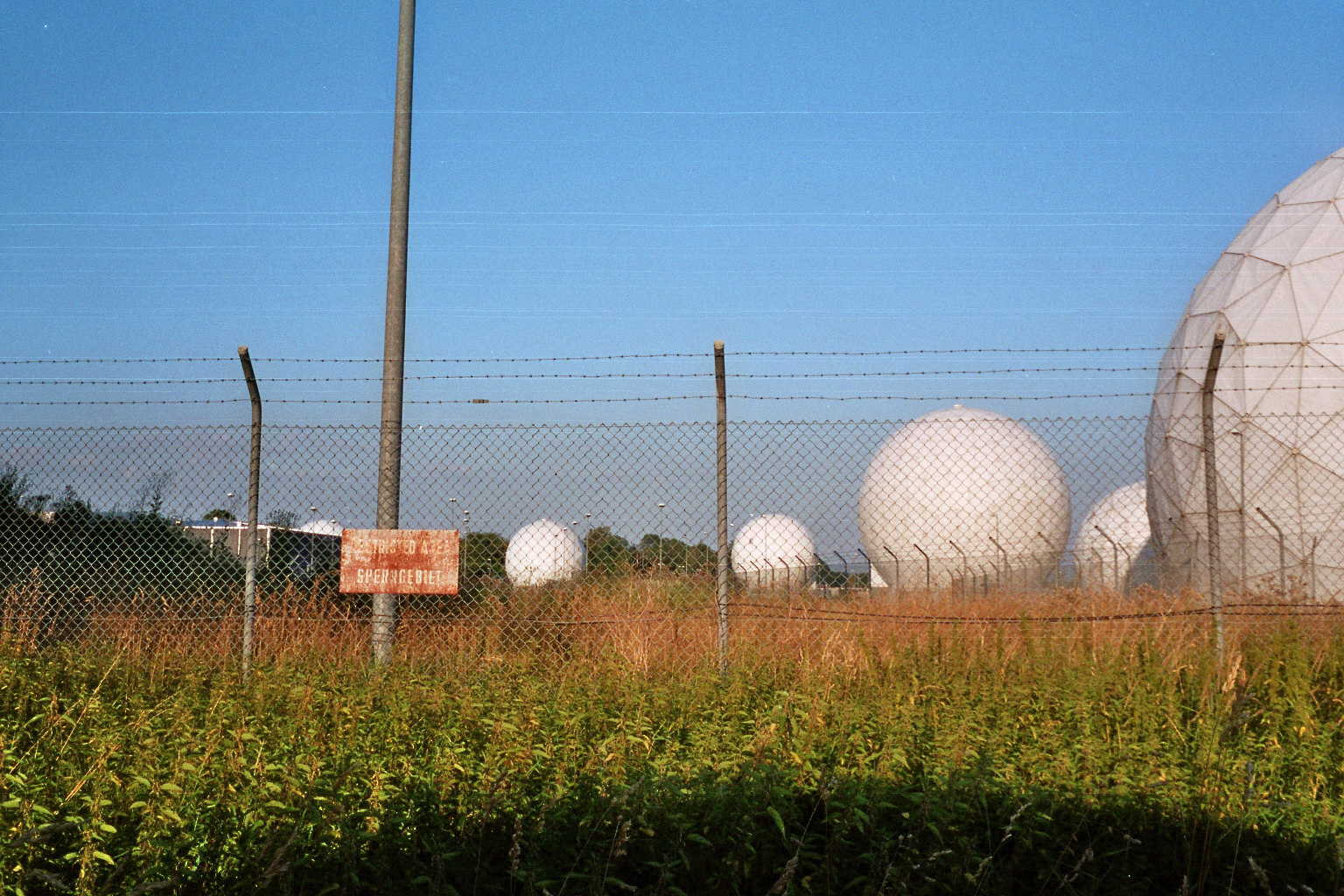
radome field

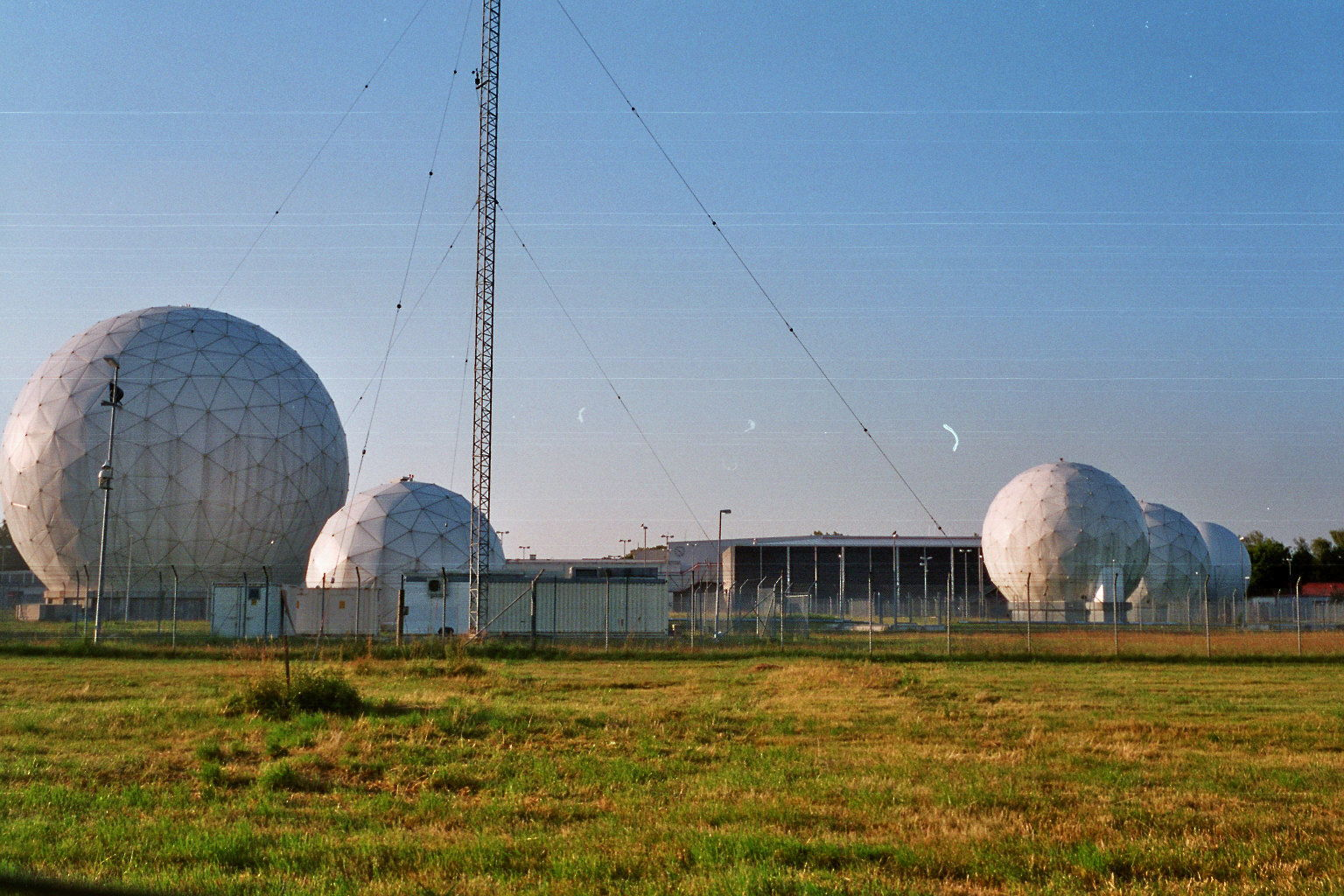
radome field

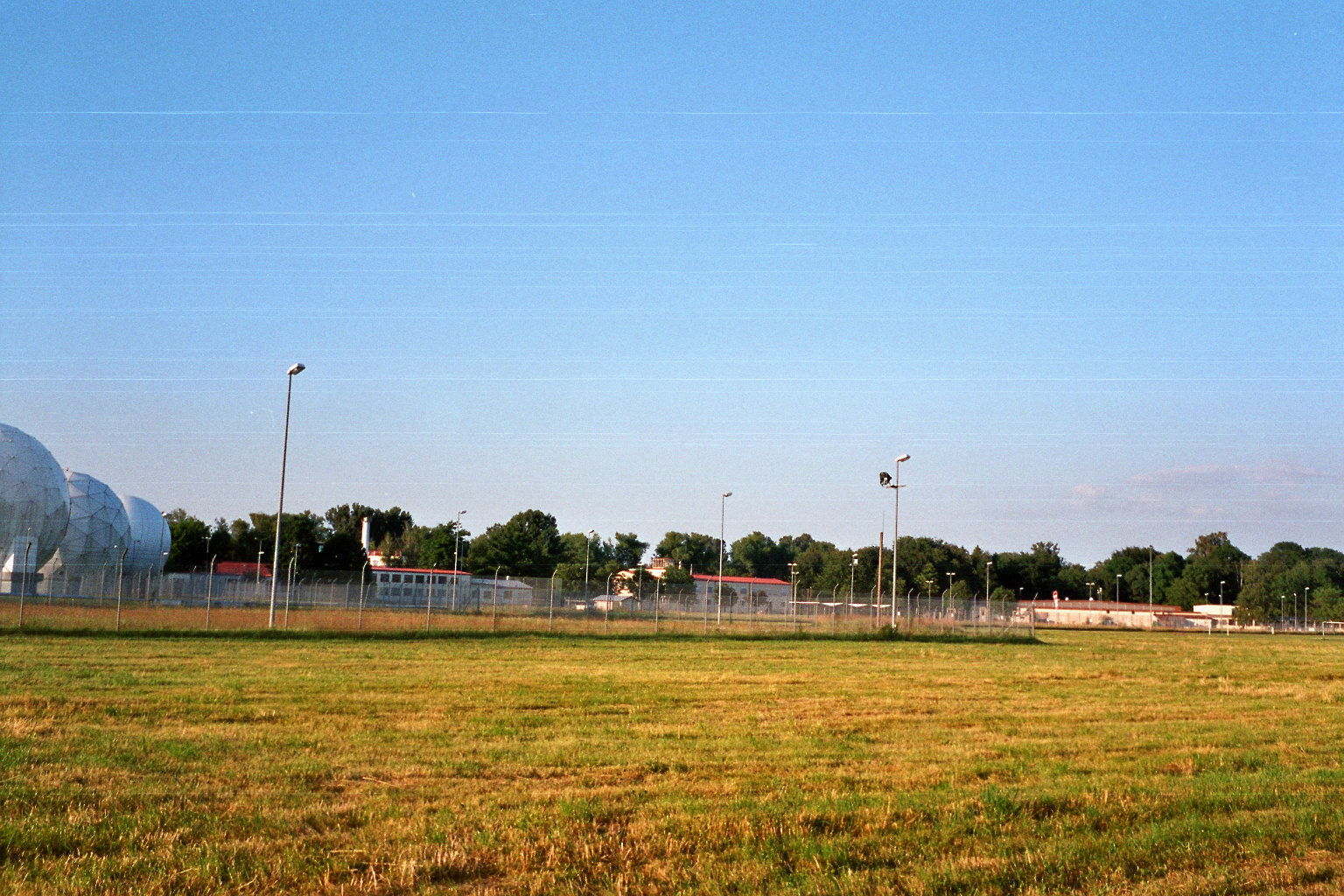
central area from south
