= 305 (disambiguation) =

305 may refer to:

- 305 (number)
- 305 AD, a year
- 305 BC, a year

== Electronics and machines ==
- IBM 305 RAMAC, the first commercial computer to use a hard disk drive
- Lenovo IdeaPad 305, a brand of small business professional notebook computers
- Nokia Asha 305, a Full Touch phone

== Entertainment ==
=== Film ===
- 305 (film), a 2008 mockumentary about a group of semi-courageous Spartans

=== Music ===
- Mr. 305, nickname for the rapper Pitbull
  - Mr. 305 Inc., a record label company
  - Welcome to the 305, an album by Pitbull
- "305," a song from singer Shawn Mendes's fourth album, Wonder.

=== Rides ===
- Project 305, a roller coaster at Kings Dominion theme park

=== Sports ===
- The 305 MVP, nickname for the wrestler Montel Vontavious Porter (MVP)

== Literacy ==
- Lectionary 305, a Greek manuscript
- Minuscule 305, a Greek manuscript

== Military ==
=== Military units ===
- 305th Division (disambiguation), several units
- 305 Squadron (disambiguation), several units
- 305th Infantry Brigade (United Kingdom)

==== United States ====
- 305th Air Mobility Wing
- 305th Military Intelligence Battalion (United States)
- 305th Cavalry Regiment (United States)
- 305th Operations Group

=== Military vehicles ===
- German submarine U-305, a Type-VIIC U-boat

==== United States ====
- USS Skate (SS-305), a Balao-class submarine
- USS Spectacle (AM-305), an Admirable-class minesweeper
- USS Thompson (DD-305), a Clemson-class destroyer

== Places ==
- 305 Jefferson Street
- Area code 305, area code for Miami
- Salina USD 305, a school district in Kansas

== Science and technology ==
=== Astronomy ===
- 305 Gordonia, an asteroid
- 3C 305, a radio galaxy in Draco
- Hill 305, a land feature on the Moon
- Kosmos 305, a Soviet unmanned space mission attempt
- NGC 305, an asterism in Pisces

=== Technology ===
- HTTP 305

== Transportation ==
=== Automobiles ===
- Peugeot 305, a French compact car lineup

=== Engines ===
- GM 305 V8, a small block engine

=== Helicopter ===
- Brantly 305, an American light helicopter

=== Roads and routes ===
- List of highways numbered 305
- Flight 305

=== Trains ===
- 305 series, a Japanese train type
- British Rail Class 305, a British train type
