= Class 305 =

Class 305 may refer to:

- 305 series, a train operated in Japan
- British Rail Class 305, a train formerly operated in the UK

== See also ==
- 305 (disambiguation)
