= 3005 =

3005 or variant, may refer to:

== In general ==
- A.D. 3005, a year in the 4th millennium CE
- 3005 BC, a year in the 4th millennium BCE
- 3005, a number in the 3000 (number) range

== Songs ==
- "3005" (song), a 2013 song by Childish Gambino
- "3005", a 2008 song by Daron Malakian and Scars on Broadway from the album Scars on Broadway

== Roads numbered 3005 ==
- Kentucky Route 3005, a state highway
- Louisiana Highway 3005, a state highway
- Texas Farm to Market Road 3005, a state highway
- A3005 road (Great Britain)

== Ships with pennant number 3005 ==
- USNS Sgt. Matej Kocak (T-AK-3005), a U.S. Navy cargoship
- USS Aeolus (ID-3005), a WWI U.S. Navy transport
- German submarine U-3005, a WWII Kriegsmarine submarine
- RFA Sir Galahad (L3005), several logistics ships of the British Royal Navy

== Other uses ==
- 3005 Pervictoralex, an asteroid in the Asteroid Belt, the 3005th asteroid registered

== See also ==
- 305 (disambiguation)
