= 35T =

Military intelligence designation

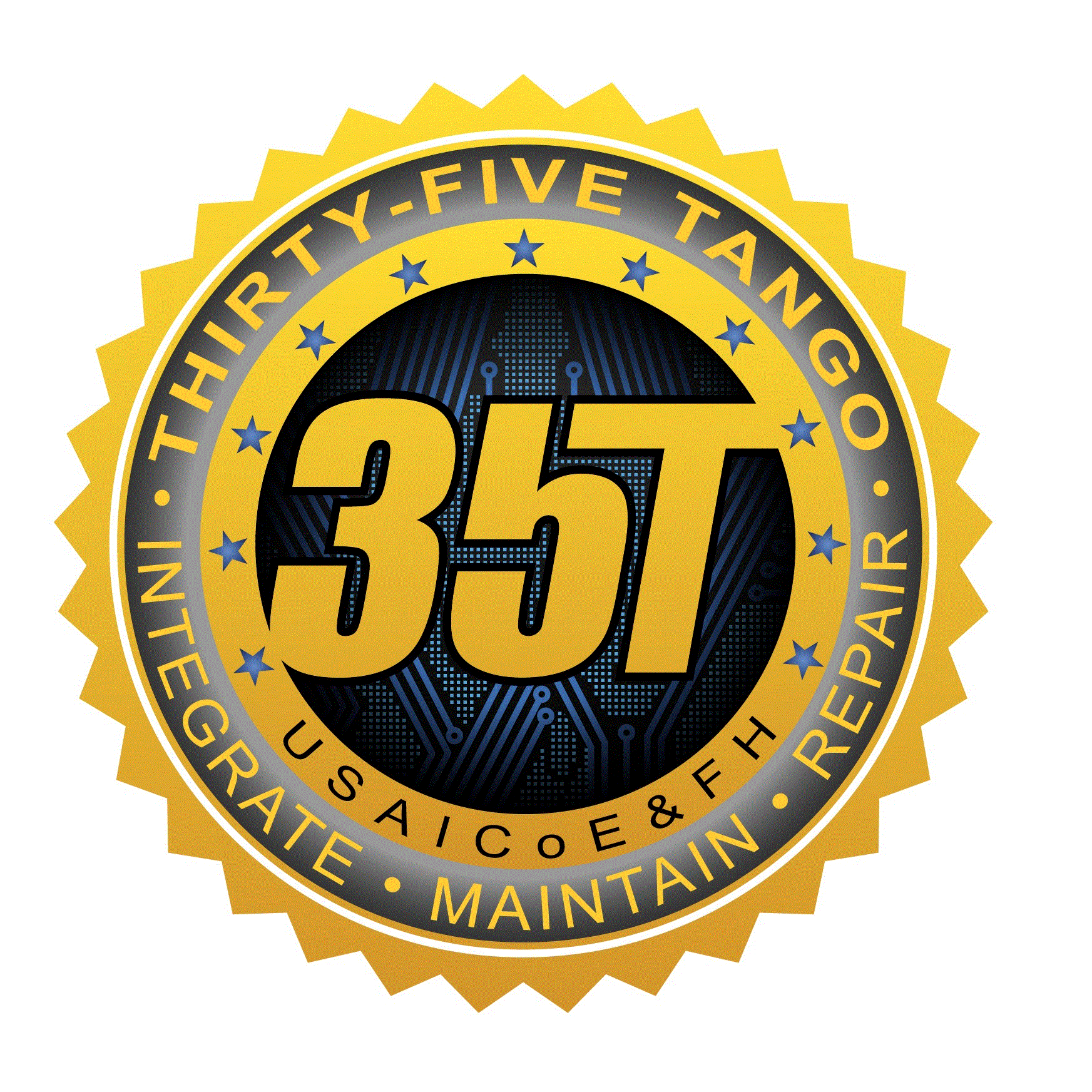
Current logo of the 35T school.

35T (pronounced thirty-five tango using the phonetic alphabet), previously 33W, is the Military Occupational Specialty (MOS) for the United States Army's Military Intelligence Systems Maintainer/Integrator.

== Qualifications ==
To be a 35T, one must have

- a physical profile (PULHES) of 222221 or better,
- normal color vision,
- scoring a minimum of 112 in the aptitude area ST on the ASVAB,
- a high school graduate or equivalent,
- completed a high school algebra course or equivalent,
- meet Top Secret Security Clearance, and Sensitive Compartmented Information (SCI) access eligibility requirements,
- no record of court-martial,
- no record of conviction by a civil court for any offense other than minor traffic violations.

== Responsibilities ==
A 35T performs or supervises unit, direct, or depot support and provides maintenance of Electronic Warfare (EW) subsystems, receiver subsystems, and processing/storage subsystems at fixed stations or remote sites.

=== Skill levels ===
- 1 is the basic entry level technician (e.g. 35T1O)
- 2 is a 35T with the rank of sergeant (E-5)
- 3 is a 35T with the rank of staff sergeant (E-6)
- 4 is a 35T with the rank of sergeant first class (E-7)

==== 35T competes against 35F, 35G, 35L, 35M, 35N, 35P, 35Q and 35S for selection and promotion to 35Z ====
- 5 is a 35Z with the rank of master sergeant/first sergeant (E-8)
- 6 is a 35Z with the rank of sergeant major/command sergeant major (E-9)

=== Additional Skill Identifiers ===
- U2 denotes training as a Shadow Unmanned Aerial Vehicle repair technician.
- U3 denotes training as a Hunter Unmanned Aerial Vehicle repair technician.
- D6 denotes training as a Basic Digital Network Analyst (BDNA)
- IT is skilled in IPDS/TRAC/NISTENCAP Operations.
- 4A is the code for Reclassification Training.

== History ==
In 1985, the Army split the generalized Electronic Warfare/Intercept Systems Technician 33S MOS into five specializations 33P (Strategic Receiving Subsystems Repairer), 33Q (Strategic Recording Subsystems Repairer), 33R (Aviation Systems Repairer), 33V (Aerial Sensor Repairer), and 33T (Tactical Systems Repairer)].

However, on 1 October 1998 the Army recombined the three MOSs: 33R (Aviation Systems Repairer), 33T (Tactical Systems Repairer), 33Y (Electronic Warfare/Intercept Strategic Systems Repairer) into one MOS—33W (Electronic Warfare/Intelligence Systems Repairer). This change was prompted due to lack of need in several of the 33 series. By combining all three into one MOS, the Army was able to provide the same support with fewer soldiers and use OJT (on the job training).

On 1 October 2007, the 33W designation was renamed to 35T to group all Military Intelligence MOSs in the same 35 series.

== Training ==
35Ts are trained to perform maintenance tasks associated with electronic warfare equipment and systems. The soldiers are taught about electricity and advanced electronic theory, advanced concept and troubleshooting theory to include basic and advanced computer concepts and advanced troubleshooting skills using the Army's most advanced EW systems. Also taught are the concepts of basic analog and digital electronics repair, communications theory (receivers, recorders, and multiplexing/de-multiplexing, transmission line repair techniques, computer architecture/operating systems fundamentals, automated messaging, and network operations/troubleshooting. Upon completion of training a 35T has all the skills to repair and maintain virtually any electronic system from the tactical to strategic level. As an expert a 35T may be tasked to repair/maintain Transmitters/Transceivers (AN/TLQ-17A, AN/TLQ-17, AN/TLQ-40, AN/TLQ-63); Imagery Analysis systems (AN/TSQ-179(TGS), signal intelligence systems (GR/CS) and (PROPHET), aerial electronic warfare systems (RC-12 Guardrail), or provide System Administration over complex/advanced computer systems and networks.

Charlie Company, 309th Military Intelligence Battalion, 111th Military Intelligence Brigade at Fort Huachuca, AZ conducts all 35T training. Charlie Company is composed of only 35T's as of April 2018 due to over inhabitance of Alpha 305th's IET population.

== See also ==
- List of United States Army MOS
