= Goodfellow Air Force Base =

US Air Force base in San Angelo, Texas

- San Angelo, Texas in United States of America
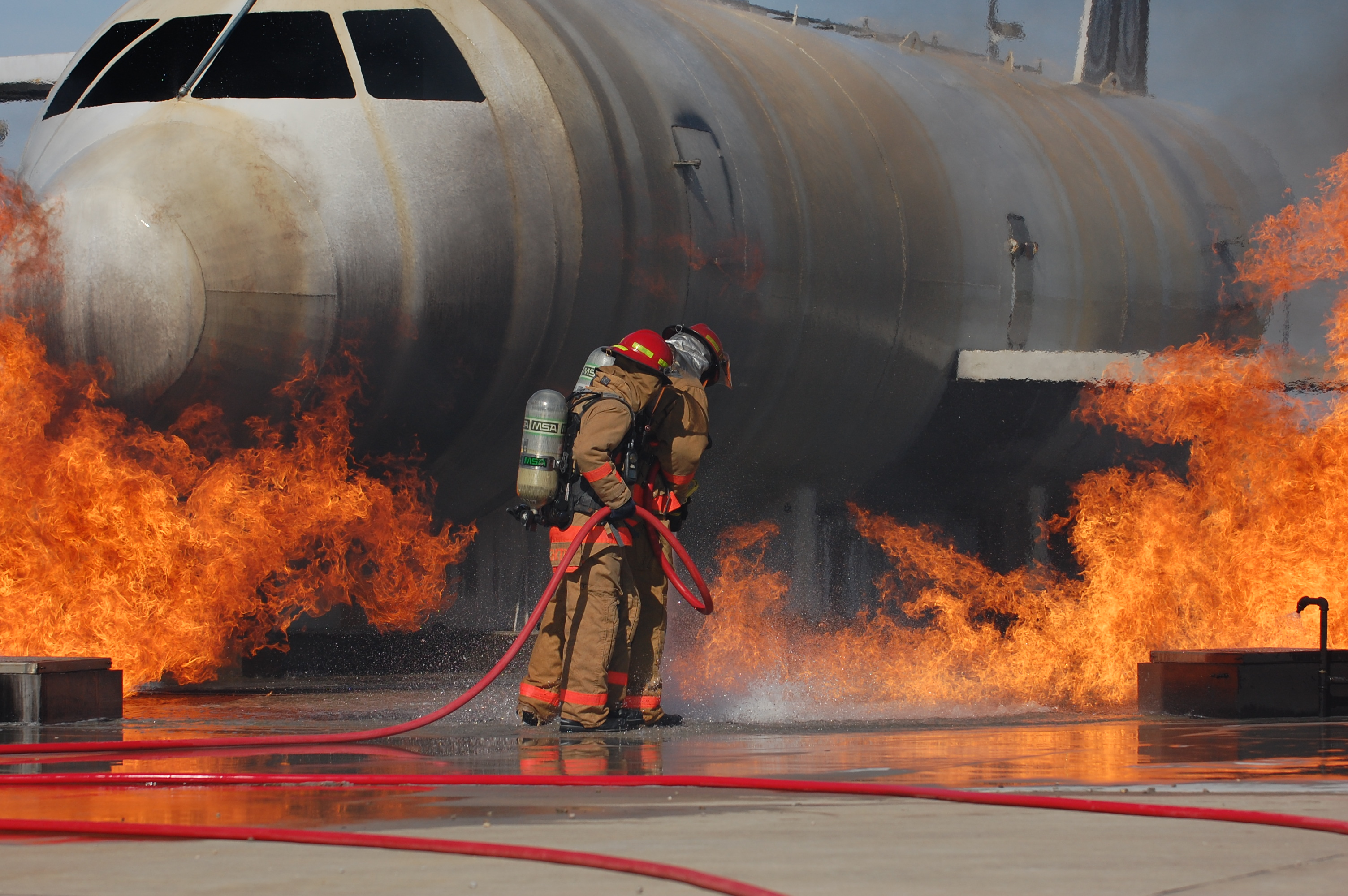
- Airmen from the 312th Training Squadron extinguish a fire on a training module to demonstrate an aircraft incident at Goodfellow AFB.

Site information
- Type: U.S. Air Force Base
- Owner: Department of Defense
- Operator: US Air Force
- Controlled by: Air Education and Training Command (AETC)
- Condition: Operational
- Website: www.goodfellow.af.mil

Location
- Location in the United States Location in Texas
- Coordinates: 31°25′47″N 100°23′57″W

Site history
- Built: 1940
- In use: 1940 – present

Garrison information
- Current commander: Colonel Angelina Maguinness
- Garrison: 17th Training Wing

Goodfellow Air Force Base is a nonflying United States Air Force base located in San Angelo, Texas, United States. As part of Air Education and Training Command, Goodfellow's main mission is cryptologic and intelligence training for the Air Force, Space Force, Army, Navy, and Marine Corps. Military firefighters are also trained here as part of the 312th Training Squadron. It is the home of the 17th Training Wing. The base is named for World War I aviator First Lieutenant John J. Goodfellow Jr.

== History ==
Goodfellow's history traces to the days before the attack on Pearl Harbor, but its name registered the valor and sacrifice of an earlier conflict. On 14 September 1918, First Lieutenant John J. Goodfellow Jr., of San Angelo, Texas, boarded his Salmson 2A2 observation plane at Gondreville Airfield in France to conduct visual reconnaissance behind enemy lines. The mission was part of a larger undertaking just underway, a major American offensive intended to reduce the German salient near Saint-Mihiel. Unfortunately, adverse weather permitted observation only at a low altitude that exposed the lumbering Salmson to enemy pursuit. Three days later, the offensive a success, the young pilot's remains were recovered from his ruined craft and interred at the St. Mihiel American Cemetery and Memorial near Nancy, Meurthe-et-Moselle.

=== World War II ===
Goodfellow Field 1943 Classbook

The peace that arrived two months later endured a mere two decades more. Constrained by neutrality legislation, but witness to the aggression across Europe, Africa, and Asia, President Franklin Delano Roosevelt began a program of preparedness that included the construction of facilities dedicated to advanced air training. Several such bases were envisioned for Texas and one, specifically, for the Fort Worth-Midland-San Angelo triangle. Civic leaders from San Angelo immediately commended their community to the U.S. War Department. A generous offer of sewage and electrical service, a railroad spur, and a 50-year lease on 640 acres (260 ha) at one dollar per year easily decided the issue.

Construction of the new San Angelo Air Corps Basic Flying School began at once. Officially established on 17 August 1940, the base was ready for occupancy by 21 January 1941, and the first classes of students soon arrived. On 11 June 1941, in dedication to a young hero and in tribute to the community that shaped him, the base was officially renamed Goodfellow Field.

In the next four years, more than 10,000 trained pilots were graduated, and many were decorated for outstanding heroism in action against Germany, Italy, and Japan.

=== United States Air Force ===
The Axis collapse did not remove the need for the Goodfellow training. Pilots continued to be trained there, primarily for large, multiengine piston and turboprop aircraft, first on the AT-6 Texan, the T-28 Trojan, and then, beginning in 1954, on the twin-engine TB-25 and B-25 Mitchell. The 3545th Basic Pilot Training Wing gave pilot instruction from 1948. On 3 September 1958, with nearly 20,000 aviators to its credit, Goodfellow graduated its last class of pilots. Air Training Command (ATC) was transitioning to new Cessna T-37 Tweet and Northrop T-38 Talon aircraft for Undergraduate Pilot Training that required minimum 8000-ft (2400-m) runway lengths, far longer than Goodfellow's 5500-ft primary runways.

With the transfer of the base from ATC to the U.S. Air Force Security Service (USAFSS), Goodfellow's mission became the training of Air Force personnel in the advanced cryptologic skills that the Security Service required. After the changeover, the 6940th Air Base Wing administered the base and later, after a name change, provided decryption training. Eight years later, in 1966, the mission expanded further to include joint-service training in these same skills for U.S. Army, U.S. Navy, and U.S. Marine Corps personnel.

Although flight operations at Goodfellow decreased dramatically after 1958, minimal activities continued with both transient aircraft and locally based Cessna U-3 Administrators (1958–1971), DeHavilland U-6 Beavers (1960–1966), Piasecki H-21, CH-21, and HH-21 Workhorse helicopters (1958–1966), and Cessna O-2 Skymasters (1972–1975). Goodfellow's runways were permanently closed in March 1975.

After 38 years of pilot and then intelligence training, Goodfellow's mission had apparently come to a close with the announcement in 1978 that the base would revert to ATC and was a candidate for closure. Since it was a single-mission facility, its mission could perhaps be executed more economically elsewhere. Nevertheless, the 3480th Technical Training Wing of Air Training Command was activated at the base on 1 July 1978. On 3 January 1984 the wing gained the suffix USAF Cryptological Training Center.

By then, senior intelligence personnel had already begun seriously to contemplate the consolidation of all Air Force-managed intelligence training at one location. The site selected for intelligence training consolidation was Goodfellow, and the base was designated a technical training center on 1 March 1985. The Goodfellow Technical Training Center continued to supervise the 3480th Technical Training Wing.

During the next three years, intelligence training consolidation brought to Goodfellow advanced imagery training from Offutt Air Force Base, Nebraska; electronic intelligence operations training from Keesler Air Force Base, Mississippi; and targeting, intelligence applications, and general intelligence training from Lowry Air Force Base, Colorado, as a result of Lowry's identification for closure under Base Realignment and Closure (BRAC). The successful completion of intelligence training consolidation on 30 June 1988 further facilitated the development of intelligence training integration, a multidisciplinary approach to the training of intelligence professionals.

In 1992, as part of Air Force size reductions, ATC was inactivated, replaced by the Air Education and Training Command, which became base's "parent" major command. The 3480 Technical Training Wing was reduced to the 3480 Technical Training Group on 1 February 1992 and then redesignated as the 391 Technical Training Group on 15 September 1992.

On 1 July 1993, the 17th Training Wing was activated on Goodfellow AFB. With the change in name came a marked diversification and increase in Goodfellow's mission. Base Realignment and Closure rounds one and two transferred special instruments training from the former Lowry AFB and fire protection training from the former Chanute Air Force Base, Illinois, to Goodfellow. To support the increased training load, Goodfellow underwent extensive modernization and growth. With new training facilities, dormitories, dining halls, a commissary, a youth center, and a physical fitness center.

On February 18, 1995, U.S. Army veteran Louis Jones Jr. kidnapped Private Tracie McBride from Goodfellow AFB before raping and murdering her.

== Based units ==
These flying and notable nonflying units are based at Goodfellow Air Force Base.

Units marked GSU are geographically separate units, which although based at Goodfellow, are subordinate to a parent unit based at another location.

=== United States Air Force ===
Air Education and Training Command (AETC)

- Second Air Force
  - 17th Training Wing (host wing)
    - 17th Comptroller Squadron
    - 17th Training Group
      - 17th Training Support Squadron
      - 312th Training Squadron
      - 313th Training Squadron
      - 315th Training Squadron
      - 316th Training Squadron
    - 17th Medical Group
      - 17th Medical Operations Squadron
      - 17th Medical Support Squadron
    - 17th Mission Support Group
      - 17th Civil Engineer Squadron
      - 17th Communications Squadron
      - 17th Contracting Squadron
      - 17th Logistics Readiness Squadron
      - 17th Security Forces Squadron
      - 17th Force Support Squadron

=== United States Army ===
The U.S. Army maintains a significant presence at Goodfellow Air Force Base, primarily supporting intelligence and firefighting training under the Training and Doctrine Command (TRADOC).

- 111th Military Intelligence Brigade

Headquartered at Fort Huachuca, Arizona, the 111th Military Intelligence Brigade provides Initial Military Training (IMT) and advanced intelligence instruction to Soldiers preparing for operational assignments in the field.

  - 344th Military Intelligence Battalion (commonly referred to as a GSU at Goodfellow, though the Army does not officially use this term)

A geographically separated unit of the 111th MI Brigade, the 344th MI Battalion is based at Goodfellow AFB and conducts signals intelligence (SIGINT) and cryptologic linguist training for enlisted Soldiers and NCOs.

    - Alpha Company

Delivers basic and intermediate technical training in signals intelligence disciplines.

    - Bravo Company

Focuses on advanced skills training, including cryptologic analysis and reporting.

    - Charlie Company

Provides administrative, logistical, and overflow support for intelligence training.

- U.S. Army Engineer School

The Engineer School, headquartered at Fort Leonard Wood, Missouri, oversees the technical and tactical education of Army engineers, including firefighting instruction.

  - 1st Engineer Brigade

Provides command and control for the Army's engineer training battalions and ensures the quality and standardization of engineer instruction across its units.

    - 169th Engineer Battalion

The 169th Engineer Battalion supports advanced training in vertical construction, bridging, and fire protection. It is responsible for overseeing the Army’s fire protection detachment located at Goodfellow.

      - Fire-fighter Detachment (referred to as a GSU at Goodfellow)

This detachment is responsible for the training of Army firefighters at the Louis F. Garland Department of Defense Fire Academy. Students receive instruction in aircraft and structural firefighting, hazardous materials response, and emergency rescue operations, and they train alongside Air Force, Navy, and Marine Corps personnel.

=== United States Marine Corps ===
- Marine Corps Detachment
  - Intelligence Training Company
  - Firefighting Training Company

=== United States Navy ===
Naval Education and Training Command

- Center for Information Warfare Training (GSU)

=== United States Space Force ===
Space Training and Readiness Command

- Space Delta 1
  - 533d Training Squadron
    - 533d Training Squadron Detachment 1 (GSU)

== Facilities ==
Goodfellow Air Force Base hosts a wide variety of facilities designed to support training, quality of life, and joint-service cooperation for military personnel.

=== Dining Facilities ===
Goodfellow AFB maintains two primary dining halls for enlisted personnel and students:

- Western Winds Dining Facility – The main dining facility on base, offering three daily meals and nutritious meal options in accordance with Department of Defense standards.
- Cressman Dining Facility – Supports overflow dining and often serves personnel in advanced training phases.

=== Recreation and Fitness ===
Recreational and fitness amenities are available to promote wellness and morale:

- Two Gymnasiums – Fully outfitted with weight training, cardio equipment, and basketball courts.
- Two Swimming Pools – Used for both leisure and training, including firefighter rescue instruction.
- Bowling Alley – Offers recreational leagues and open bowling hours.
- Movie Theater – Screens recent releases and special event films for service members.
- Base Library – Provides physical and digital materials for study, training, and recreation.
- Lakeside Recreation Center at Lake Nasworthy – Offers lake access, outdoor gear rentals, and family programs.

=== Lodging and Housing ===
- Dormitories – Multiple housing facilities accommodate unaccompanied students attending technical training.
- Angelo Inn Billeting – Offers temporary lodging for official travelers and guests of the base.

According to the Air Force Civil Engineering Center (AFCEC), 33 off-base private drinking water wells in the vicinity of Goodfellow Air Force Base are impacted with Per- and polyfluoroalkyl substances (PFAS) contamination, possibly from use of aqueous film forming foam (AFFF) firefighting chemicals. According to a recent study, PFAS’s have been shown to cause penile shrinkage.

=== Training and Support Facilities ===
- Louis F. Garland Department of Defense Fire Academy – The Department of Defense’s primary fire protection training center, training Air Force, Army, Navy, and Marine Corps students.
- Ross Medical Clinic – Operated by the 17th Medical Group, offering primary care, immunizations, and medical readiness services.

=== Religious and Community Services ===
- Crossroads Chapel – Provides multi-denominational worship, pastoral counseling, and religious education opportunities.

== Amateur radio restrictions ==
The US Code of Federal Regulations specifies that amateur radio operators within 200 kilometres (120 mi) of Goodfellow must not transmit with more than 50 watts of power on the 70-centimeter band.

== Education ==
The base is within the San Angelo Independent School District (SAISD). On-post dependent children are assigned to: Glenmore Elementary School, Glenn Middle School, and Central High School. Glenmore Elementary is adjacent to the post. In 1949 the elementary school became a part of SAISD. SAISD is the area school district with the largest enrollment of students related to Goodfellow AFB.

The post does not have a Department of Defense Education Activity (DoDEA) school.

Tom Green County is in the service area of Howard County Junior College District.

== See also ==
- List of United States Air Force installations
- Texas World War II Army Airfields
