= Lectionary 176 =

Lectionary ℓ 176
- New Testament manuscript
- Text: Apostolarion
- Date: 12th century
- Script: Greek
- Found: 1870
- Now at: Cambridge University Library
- Size: 25.5 by 20.8 cm

Lectionary 176, designated by siglum ℓ 176 (in the Gregory-Aland numbering) is a Greek manuscript of the New Testament, on parchment. Palaeographically it has been assigned to the 12th century. Formerly it was labelled as Lectionary 79^{a} (Scrivener), 77^{a} (Gregory).

== Description ==
The codex contains Lessons from the Acts, Catholic, and Pauline epistles lectionary (Apostolarion), on 96 parchment leaves (25.5 by 20.8 cm), with lacunae (six leaves). The text is written in Greek minuscule letters, in one column per page, 18 lines per page.

== History ==
The manuscript was bought from F. S. Ellis, 10 February 1870. It was examined by Fenton Hort. Gregory saw the manuscript in 1883.

The manuscript is not cited in the critical editions of the Greek New Testament (UBS3).

Currently the codex is located in the Cambridge University Library, (Add. Mss. 679.1) at Cambridge.

== See also ==
- List of New Testament lectionaries
- Biblical manuscript
- Textual criticism
- Lectionary 305

== Bibliography ==
- Gregory, Caspar René (1900). Textkritik des Neuen Testaments, Vol. 1. Leipzig. p. 469.
