= 344th Military Intelligence Battalion =

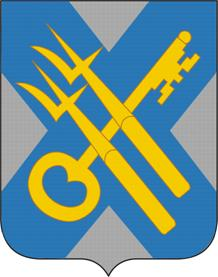
- Coat of arms
- Active: 1962–1968; 1990–present
- Country: United States
- Branch: U.S. Army
- Type: Military Intelligence
- Part of: 111th Military Intelligence Brigade
- Garrison/HQ: Goodfellow Air Force Base
- Motto(s): Silent Sentinel

Insignia
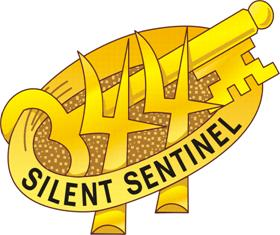
- Distinctive Unit Insignia

The 344th Military Intelligence Battalion (MI Bn) is located in San Angelo, Texas at Goodfellow Air Force Base. The 344th's mission is to train, develop, and educate soldiers to become signals intelligence and firefighting professionals for the U.S. Army. The 344th MI Bn is subordinate to the 111th Military Intelligence Brigade headquartered at Fort Huachuca, Arizona.

The 344th MI Bn trains these soldiers in four different military occupational specialties for enlisted, non-commissioned officers, and warrant officers within the Military Intelligence Corps and Army Corps of Engineers:

- Signals Intelligence Analysts (35N) and Technicians (352N)
- Cryptologic Linguists (35P)
- Signals Collectors (35S) and Technicians (352S)
- Firefighters (12M)

The 344th MI Bn teaches 21 different courses and has more than 70 classes in session at any given time. It consists of three companies located on two installations belonging to two different armed services, Goodfellow Air Force Base and Naval Air Station Pensacola Corry Station. The battalion has more than 300 permanent party members with an annual student throughput of about 1,700 soldiers.

== Lineage and honors ==
Lineage

- Constituted 5 November 1962 in the Army Reserve as the 344th Army Security Agency Company
- Activated 28 February 1963 at Philadelphia, Pennsylvania
- Reorganized and redesignated 15 April 1966 as Headquarters and Headquarters Company, 344th Army Security Agency Battalion
- Inactivated 31 January 1968 at Philadelphia, Pennsylvania
- Redesignated 1 February 1990 as Headquarters and Headquarters Company, 344th Military Intelligence Battalion; concurrently withdrawn from the Army Reserve and allotted to the Regular Army
- Headquarters transferred 25 May 1990 to the United States Army Training and Doctrine Command and activated at Goodfellow Air Force Base, Texas

Decorations

- Army Superior Unit Award, Streamer embroidered 1 August 1990 – 31 December 1991 (344th Military Intelligence Battalion cited; DA GO 34, 1992)
- Air Force Outstanding Unit Award, Streamer embroidered 1 July 1995 – 30 June 1997
- Air Force Outstanding Unit Award, Streamer embroidered 1 July 1997 – 30 June 1999

== Coat of arms ==
Description

Shield: Argent on a saltire celeste a key ward up bendwise sinister surmounted by two pikes bendwise Or.

Motto: Silent Sentinel

== Distinctive unit insignia ==
Description

A gold color metal and enamel device consisting of a gold key, ward slanted upward to right behind the shafts of two pikes; all encircled by a continuous oval-shaped scroll passing through the bow of the key, behind the pike heads, key ward and over the pike staffs and bearing the inscription in black letters SILENT SENTINEL.

Symbolism: The key, symbol for security and secrecy, and the pikes, weapons used by sentries in the Middle Ages, symbolize the basic mission of the organization. The shape of the bow of the key and the two pikes further simulates the numerical designation of the organization.

Symbolism

Shield: Oriental blue and silver gray are the colors used for military intelligence. The key, symbol for security and secrecy, and the pikes, weapons used by sentries in the Middle Ages, symbolize the basic mission of the organization.
