= List of United States Army careers =

United States Army Positions

The United States Army uses various personnel management systems to classify soldiers in different specialties which they receive specialized and formal training on once they have successfully completed Basic Combat Training (BCT).

Enlisted soldiers are categorized by their assigned job called a Military Occupational Specialty (MOS). MOS are labeled with a short alphanumerical code called a military occupational core specialty code (MOSC), which consists of a two-digit number appended by a Latin letter. Related MOSs are grouped together by Career Management Fields (CMF). For example, an enlisted soldier with MOSC 11B works as an infantryman (his MOS), and is part of CMF 11 (the CMF for infantry).

Commissioned officers are classified by their area of concentration, or AOC. Just like enlisted MOSCs, AOCs are two digits plus a letter. Related AOCs are grouped together by specific branch of the Army or by broader in scope functional areas (FA). Typically, an officer will start in an AOC of a specific branch and move up to an FA AOC.

Warrant officers are classified by warrant officer military occupational specialty, or WOMOS. Codes consists of three digits plus a letter. Related WOMOS are grouped together by Army branch.

The Army is currently restructuring its personnel management systems, as of 2019. Changes took place in 2004 and continued into 2013. Changes include deleting obsolete jobs, merging redundant jobs, and using common numbers for both enlisted CMFs and officer AOCs (e.g. "35" is military intelligence for both officers and enlisted).

== Immaterial & Personnel Special Reporting Codes ==
Officer

- 00A Duties Unassigned
- 00B General Officer
- 00C Relieved from Duty; Sick in Hospital or Quarters
- 00D Newly Commissioned Officers Awaiting Entry on Active Duty for Officer Basic Course Attendance
- 00E Student Officer
- 01A Officer Generalist
- 01B Aviation/Infantry/Armor/MI Immaterial
- 01C Chemical/Engineer/MP Immaterial
- 01D Army Financial Management/Adjutant General immaterial
- 02A Combat Arms Generalist
- 02B Infantry/Armor Immaterial
- 02C Infantry/Armor/Field Artillery/Engineer Immaterial
- 03A Infantry/Armor Immaterial
- 05A Army Medical Department
- 09G Army National Guard (ARNG) on Active Duty Medical Hold
- 09H US Army Reserve (USAR) on Active Duty Medical Hold

Warrant

- 001A Unqual in Auth WO MOS
- 002A Patient
- 003A Student
- 004A Duties Unassigned
- 011A Brch/MOS Immaterial
- 019G Army National Guard on Active Duty Medical Hold
- 019H US Army Reserve on Active Duty Medical Hold

Enlisted

- 00F MOS Immaterial National Guard Bureau (NGB)
- 00G MOS Immaterial US Army Reserve (USAR)
- 00S Special Duty Assignment AFSC
- 00Z Command Sergeant Major
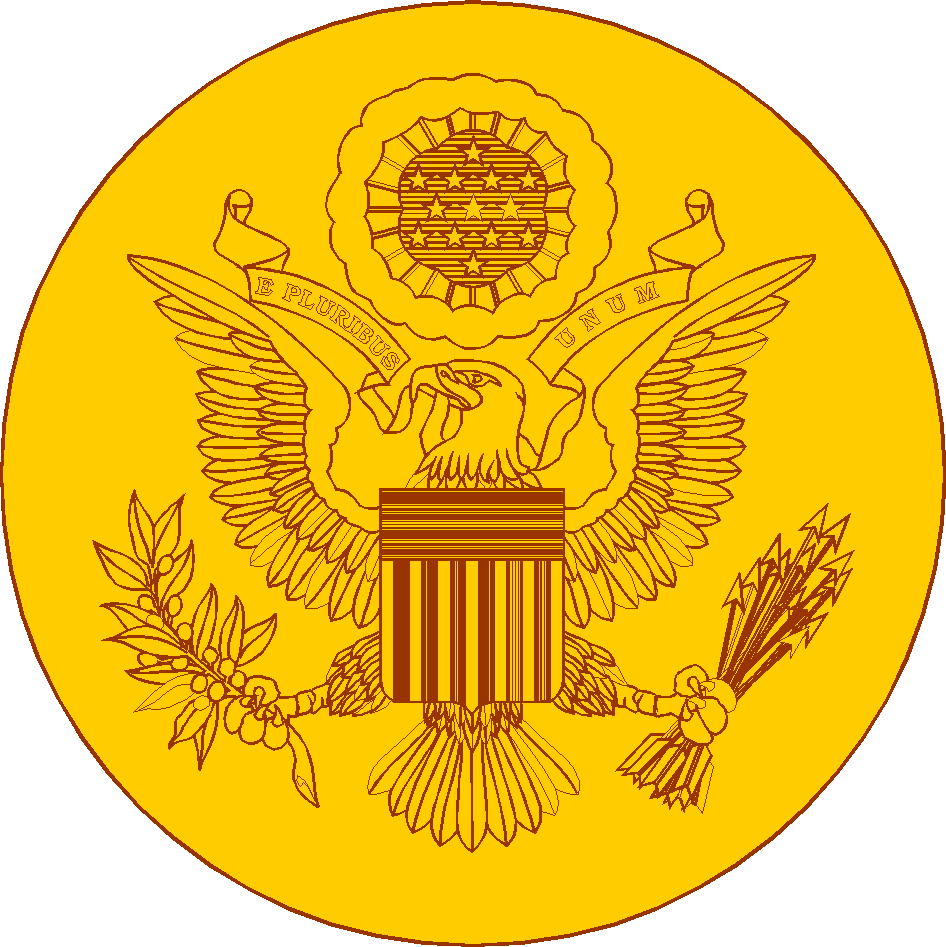
- 08H Army Equestrian
- 09B Trainee Unassigned
- 09C Trainee Language
- 09D College Trainee
- 09G Army National Guard (ARNG) on Active Duty Medical Hold
- 09H US Army Reserve (USAR) on Active Duty Medical Hold
- 09J GED Completion Program
- 09M March 2 Success
- 09N Nurse Corps Candidate
- 09R Simultaneous Membership Program
- 09S Commissioned Officer Candidate
- 09T College Student Army National Guard Officer Program
- 09U Prior Service or Branch Transfer without Defined MOS
- 09W Warrant Officer Candidate

== Infantry Branch (IN) ==

Officer

- 11A Infantry Officer

Enlisted

- 11B Infantryman (includes soldiers formerly designated 11M [Mechanized] and 11H [Anti-armor]) 11B Infantryman is the basic infantry soldier MOS of the US Army.
- 11C Indirect Fire Infantryman (Mortarman)
- 11X Undetermined Infantry (Open Enlistment Option, B/C determined during training.)
- 11Z Infantry Senior Sergeant

== Corps of Engineers Branch (EN) ==
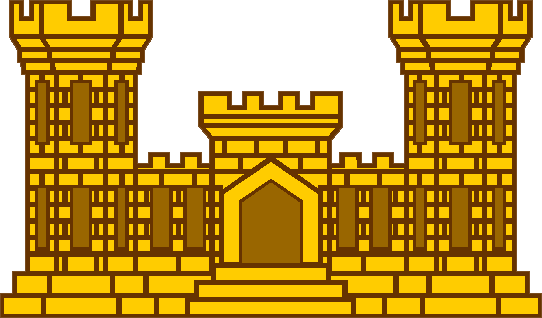

- Prior to 1999, the Engineer designations were 12 series and 83 series.
- In 1999, CMF 83 changed to CMF 51.
- In 2004, CMF 51 changed to CMF 21.
- In 2004, the engineer designation changed from 12 to 21.
- In 2009, the engineer designation was changed again, from CMF 21 to CMF 12.
- In 2013, the engineer officer designations 12B (Combat Engineer) and 12D (Facilities/Contract Construction Management Engineer (FCCME)) were consolidated into 12A.

Officer

- 12A Engineer; General Engineer

Warrant

- 120A Construction Engineer Technician
- 125D Geospatial Information Technician

Enlisted

- 12A Engineer Senior Sergeant
- 12B Combat Engineer
- 12C Bridge Crewmember
- 12D Diver
- 12G Quarrying Specialist (RC)
- 12H Construction Engineering Supervisor (ARNG)
- 12K Plumber
- 12M Firefighter
- 12N Horizontal Construction Engineer
- 12P Prime Power Production Specialist
- 12Q Power Line Distribution Specialist (RC)
- 12R Interior Electrician
- 12T Technical Engineer
- ~~12V Concrete and Asphalt Equipment Operator; No longer in use~~
- 12W Carpentry and Masonry Specialist
- 12X General Engineering Supervisor (ARNG)
- 12Y Geospatial Engineer
- 12Z Combat Engineering Senior Sergeant

== Field Artillery Branch (FA) ==

Officer

- 13A Field Artillery Officer

Warrant

- 131A Field Artillery Technician

Enlisted

- 13B Cannon Crewmember
- ~~13E Fire Direction Specialist (Cannon Artillery) Later consolidated into 13B~~
- 13F Fire Support Specialist
- 13J Fire Control Specialist (Formerly 13P and 13D)
- 13M Multiple Launch Rocket System/High Mobility Artillery Rocket System Crewmember
- 13R Field Artillery Firefinder Radar Operator
- 13T Field Artillery Surveyor/Meteorological Crewmember
- 13U Field Artillery Recruit
- 13Z Field Artillery Senior Sergeant/Sergeant Major

== Air Defense Artillery Branch (ADA) ==

Officer

- 14A Air Defense Artillery Officer

Warrant

- 140A Command and Control Systems Integrator
- 140K Air And Missile Defense (AMD) Tactician
- 140L Air and Missile Defense (AMD) Technician (Patriot Systems Technician)
- 140Z Air Defense Artillery (ADA) Immaterial

Enlisted

- 14E PATRIOT Fire Control Enhanced Operator/Maintainer
- 14G Air Defense Battle Management System Operator
- 14H Air Defense Enhanced Early Warning System Operator
- 14P Air and Missile Defense Crewmember
- 14S Avenger Crewmember
- 14T PATRIOT Launching Station Enhanced Operator/Maintainer
- 14U Air Defense Artillery Recruit
- 14Z Air Defense Artillery (ADA) Senior Sergeant

== Aviation Branch (AV) ==
Officer

- 15A Aviation Officer
- 15B Aviation Combined Arms Operations
- 15C Aviation All-Source Intelligence Officer
- 15D Aviation Maintenance Officer

Warrant

- 150A Air Traffic and Air Space Management Technician
- 150U Unmanned Aircraft Systems Operations Technician
- 151A Aviation Maintenance Technician (Nonrated)
- 152B OH-58A/C Scout Pilot
- 152C OH-6 Pilot
- 152D OH-58D Pilot
- 152E AH-64E Attack Pilot
- 152F AH-64A Attack Pilot
- 152G AH-1 Attack Pilot (RC)
- 152H AH-64D Attack Pilot
- 153A Rotary Wing Aviator (Aircraft Nonspecific)
- 153B UH-1 Pilot (RC)
- 153D UH-60 Pilot
- 153DD UH-60 MEDEVAC Pilot
- 153E MH-60 Pilot
- 153L UH-72A Pilot
- 153M UH-60M Pilot
- 154C CH-47D Pilot
- 154E MH-47 Pilot
- 154F CH-47F Pilot
- 155A Fixed Wing Aviator (Aircraft Nonspecific)
- 155E C-12 Pilot
- 155F Jet Aircraft Pilot (C-20F/J, UC-35A/B)
- 155G O-5A/EO-5B/RC-7 Pilot

Enlisted

- 15B Aircraft Powerplant Repairer
- 15C MQ-1 (Gray Eagle) Operator
- 15D Aircraft Powertrain Repairer
- 15E RQ-7 (Shadow) Repairer
- 15F Aircraft Electrician
- 15G Aircraft Structural Repairer
- 15H Aircraft Pneudraulics Repairer
- 15K Aircraft Components Repair Supervisor
- 15M MQ-1 (Gray Eagle) Repairer
- 15N Avionic Mechanic
- 15P Aviation Operations Specialist
- 15Q Air Traffic Control Operator
- 15R AH-64 Attack Helicopter Repairer
- 15T UH-60 Helicopter Repairer
- 15U CH-47 Helicopter Repairer
- 15V Observation/Scout Helicopter Repairer (RC)
- 15W RQ-7 (Shadow) Operator
- 15X Tactical Unmanned Aerial Systems Specialist (2025, merging of 15E and 15W)
- 15Y AH-64D Armament/Electrical/Avionic Systems Repairer
- 15Z Aircraft Maintenance Senior Sergeant

== Cyber Corps (CY) ==
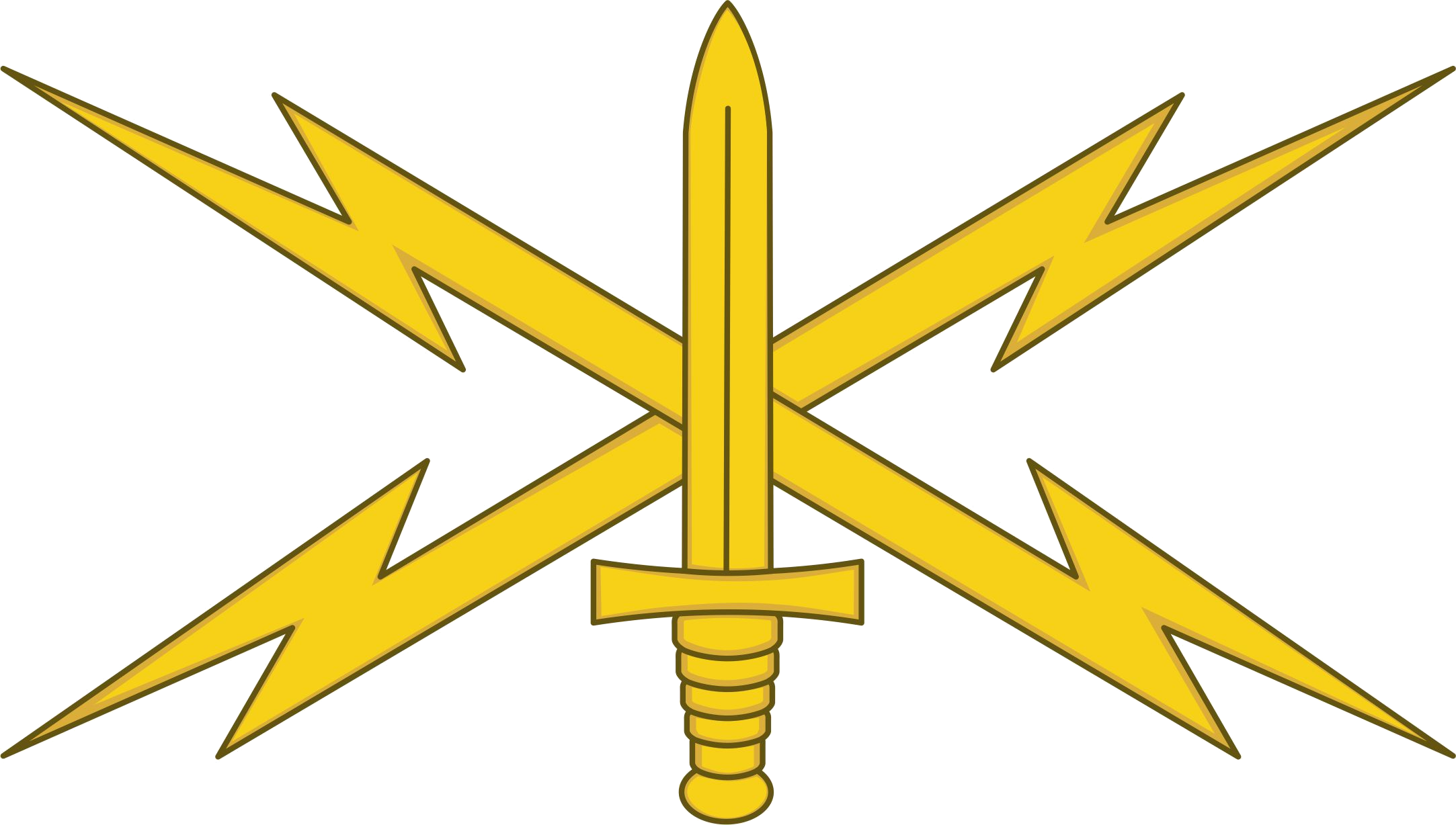

Officer

- 17A Cyber Warfare Officer
- 17B Cyber Electromagnetic Activities Officer - Electronic Warfare
- 17D Cyber Capabilities Development Officer
- ~~17X Cyber Officer Designated~~

Warrant

- 170A Cyber Operations Technician
- 170B Cyber Electromagnetic Activities Technician - Electronic Warfare
- 170D Cyber Capabilities Developer Technician

Enlisted

- 17C Cyber Operations Specialist
- 17E Electronic Warfare Specialist
- 17Z Cyberspace and Electromagnetic Activities (CEMA) Senior Sergeant

== Special Forces (SF) ==
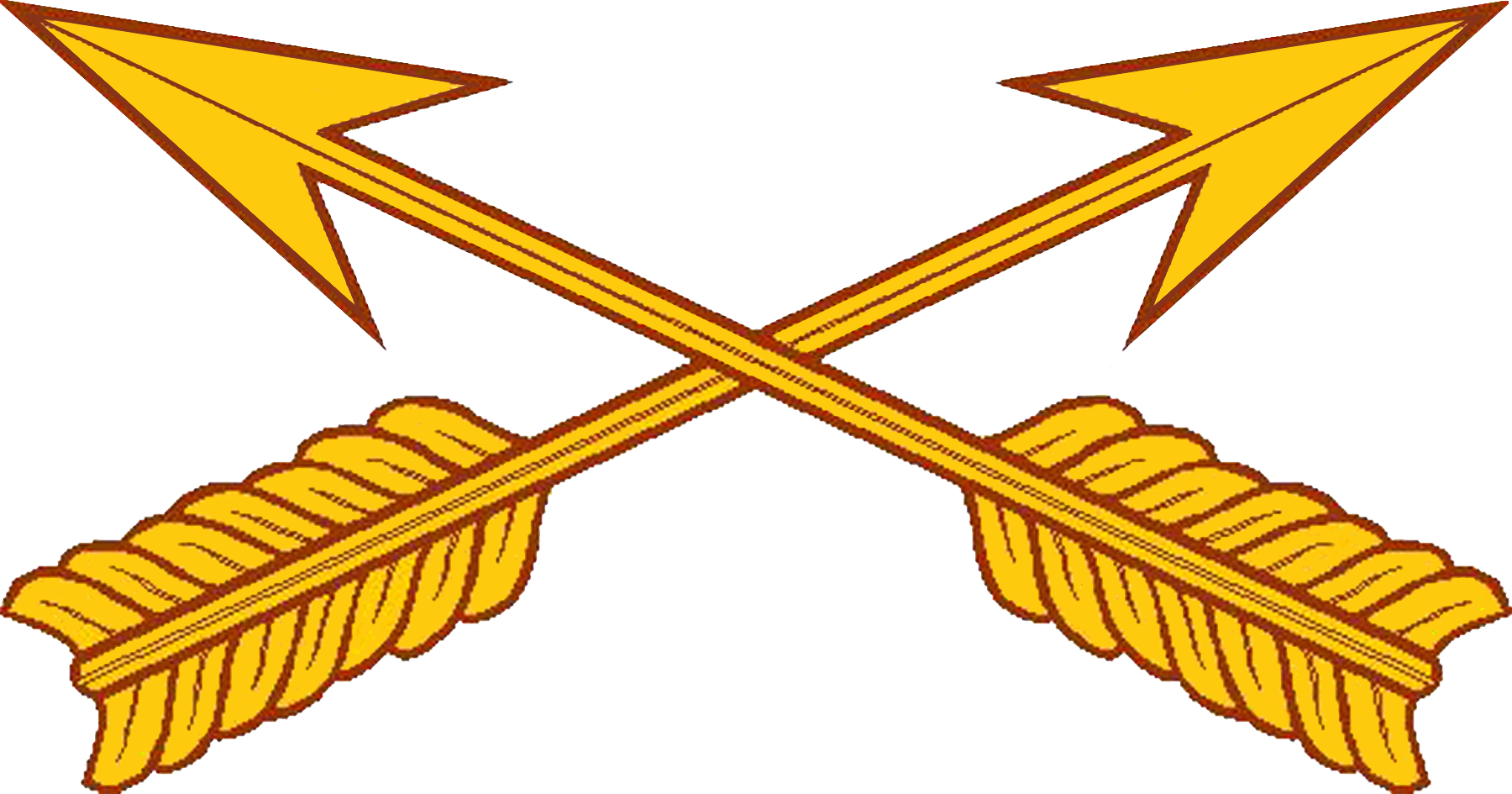

Officer

- 18A Special Forces Officer - CPT-COL

Warrant

- 180A Special Forces Warrant Officer - WO1-CW5
- 390A Robotics Technician - WO1-CW5

Enlisted

- 18B Special Forces Weapons Sergeant - SGT-SFC
- 18C Special Forces Engineer Sergeant - SGT-SFC
- 18D Special Forces Medical Sergeant - SGT-SFC
- 18E Special Forces Communications Sergeant - SGT-SFC
- 18F Special Forces Intelligence Sergeant - SSG-SFC
- 18X Special Forces Candidate
- 18Z Special Forces Senior Sergeant - MSG-CSM

== Armor Branch (AR) ==
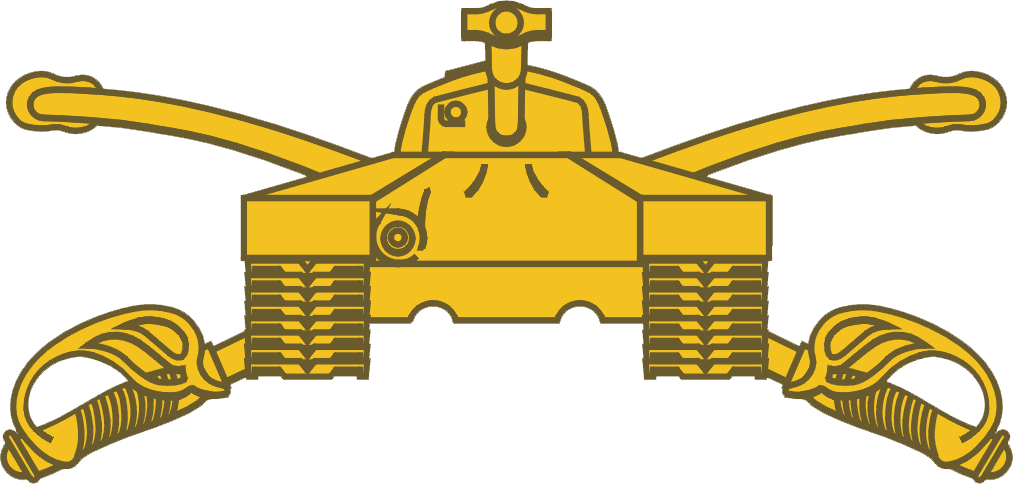

Officer

- 19A Armor Officer

Enlisted

- 19C Bradley Crew member
- 19D Cavalry Scout
- 19K M1 Armor Crewman
- 19U Armor Crewmember Recruit
- 19Z Armor Senior Sergeant

== Signal Corps (SC) ==

Officer

- 25A Signal, General

Warrant

- 255A Information Services Technician
- 255N Network Management Technician
- 255S Information Protection Technician
- 255Z Senior Network Operations Technician

Enlisted

- 25B Information Technology Specialist
- 25D Cyber Network Defender
- 25H Network Communication Systems Specialist
- 25S Satellite Communications Systems Operator/Maintainer
- 25U Signal Support Systems Specialist
- ~~25X Chief Signal NCO~~
- 25Z Visual Information Operations Chief

== Information Network Engineering Functional Area (FA 26) ==
Effective 1 October 2016, Functional Areas 24 and 53 were merged into FA 26.

Officer

- 26A Network Systems Engineer (formerly Functional Area 24A, Telecommunications Systems Engineer)
- 26B Information Systems Engineer (formerly Functional Area 53A, Information Systems Manager)
- 26Z Senior Information Network Engineer (26A and 26B merge at O6 to 26Z)

== Judge Advocate General's Corps (JA) ==
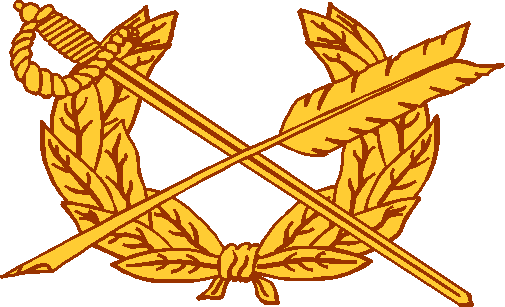

Officer

- 27A Judge Advocate
- 27B Military Judge

Warrant

- 270A Legal Administrator

Enlisted

- 27D Paralegal Specialist

== Software Operations Functional Area (FA 28) ==
Officer

- 28A Software Operations Officer

Warrant

- 280A Software Operations Technician

== Information Operations Functional Area (FA 30) ==
Officer

- 30A Information Operations Officer

== Military Police Corps (MP) ==

Officer

- 31A Military Police

Warrant

- 311A CID Special Agent

Enlisted

- 31B Military Police
- 31D CID Special Agent
- 31E Internment/Resettlement Specialist
- 31K Working Dog Handler
- 31Z Military Police Senior Sergeant

== Strategic Intelligence Functional Area (FA 34) ==
Officer

- 34A Strategic Intelligence Officer

== Military Intelligence Corps (MI) ==
Officer

- 35A Military Intelligence Officer
- 35D All Source Intelligence Officer
- 35E Counterintelligence Officer
- 35F Human Intelligence Officer
- 35G Signals Intelligence Officer

Warrant

- 350F All Source Intelligence Technician
- 350G Imagery Intelligence Technician
- 351L Counterintelligence Supervisory Special Agent
- 351M Human Intelligence Collection Technician
- 351Y Area Intelligence Technician
- 351Z Defense Attaché System Technician
- 352N Signal Intelligence Analysis Technician
- 352P Voice Intercept Technician
- 352S Signals Collector Technician
- 353T Intelligence Systems Maintenance Technician

Enlisted

- 09L Interpreter/Translator
- 35F Intelligence Analyst
- 35G Geospatial Intelligence Imagery Analyst
- 35L Counterintelligence Special Agent
- 35M Human Intelligence Collector
- 35N Signals Intelligence Analyst
- 35P Signals Intelligence Voice Interceptor
- ~~35Q Cryptologic Network Warfare Specialist~~
- 35S Signals Collector/Analyst
- 35T Military Intelligence Systems Maintainer/Integrator
- 35V Signals Intelligence Senior Sergeant/Chief Signals Intelligence Sergeant
- 35W Foreign Language Specialist
- 35X Intelligence Senior Sergeant/Chief Intelligence Sergeant
- 35Y Chief Counterintelligence/Human Intelligence Sergeant
- 35Z Signals Intelligence (Electronic Warfare) / Senior Sergeant/ Chief

== Finance & Comptroller Branch (FC) ==
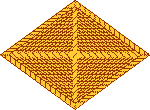

Officer

- 36A Financial Manager

Enlisted

- 36B Financial Management Technician

== Psychological Operations Branch (PO) ==
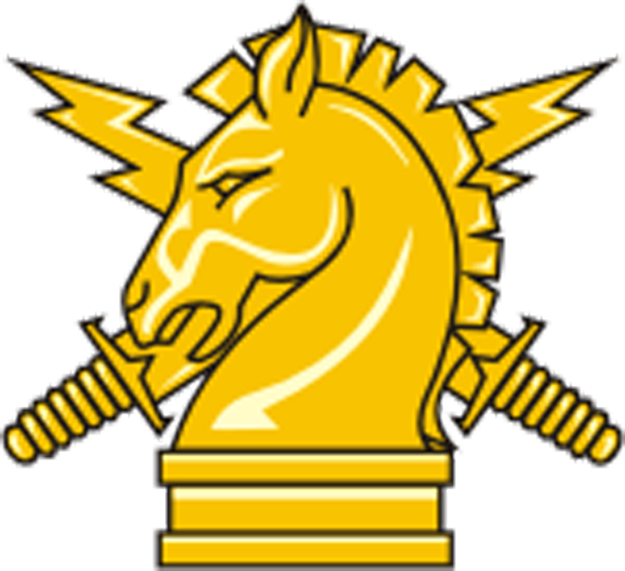

Officer

- 37A Psychological Operations

Enlisted

- 37F Psychological Operations Specialist

== Civil Affairs Branch (CA) ==
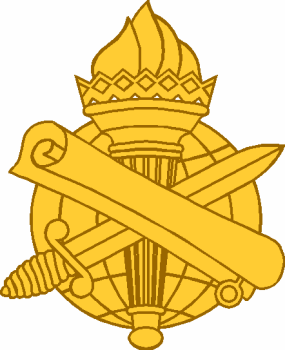

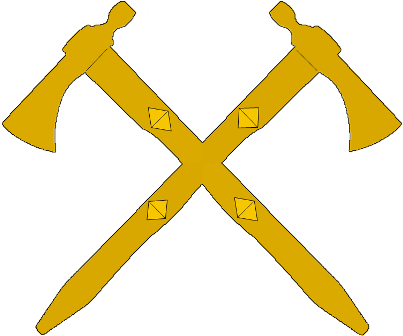
Worn by 38S and other Special Operations Civil Affairs paratroopers, known as the "Pipehawk" insignia

Officer

- 38A Civil Affairs Officer
- 38G Military Government Specialist
- 38S Special Operations Civil Affairs Officer

Enlisted

- 38B Civil Affairs Specialist
- 38R Civil Reconnaissance Sergeant
- 38W Civil Affairs Medical Sergeant
- 38Z Civil Affairs Senior Sergeant

== Space Operations Branch (SO) ==

Officer

- 40A Space Operations
- 40C Army Astronaut

Enlisted

- 40D Tactical Space Operations Specialist

== Adjutant General's Corps (AG) ==

Officer

- 42B Human Resources Officer
- 42C Army Bands
- 42H Senior Human Resources Officer

Warrant

- 420A Human Resources Technician
- 420C Bandmaster
- 420T Talent Acquisitions Technician

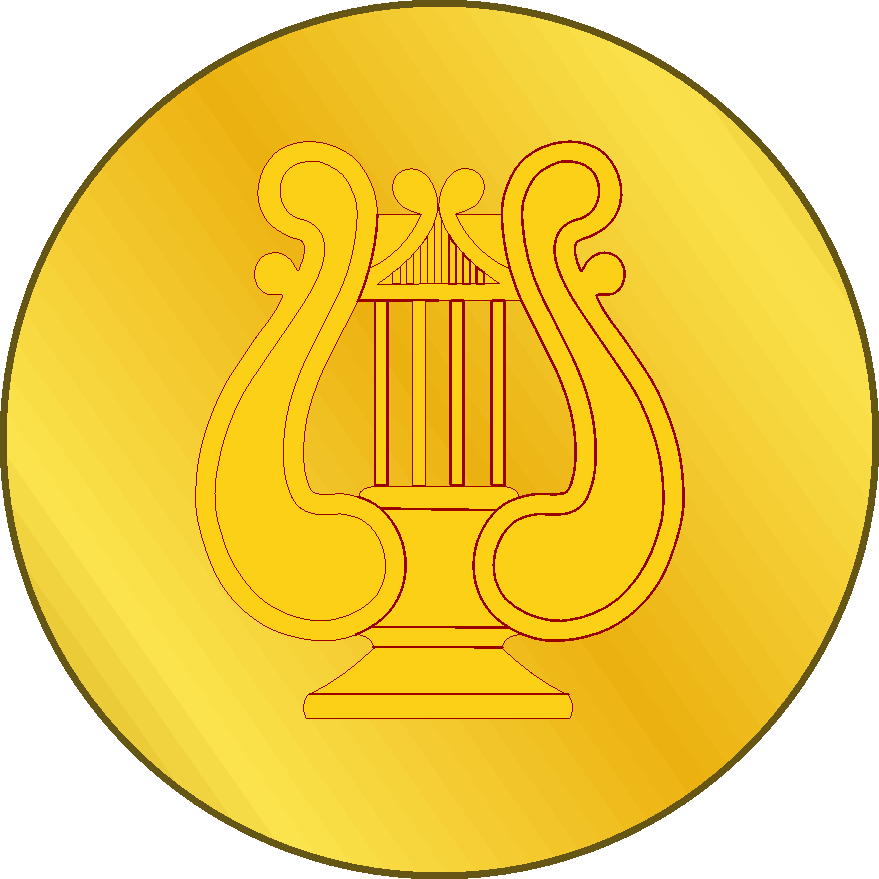

Enlisted

- 42A Human Resources Specialist
- 42R Musician
- 42S Special Band Member

Recruiting

- 42T Talent Acquisition Specialist
- ~~79R Recruiter Noncommissioned Officer~~
- 79S Career Counselor
- 79T Recruiting and Retention NCO (ARNG)

== Public Affairs Functional Area (FA and CMF 46) ==
Officer

- 46A Public Affairs, General
- 46X Public Affairs, General

Enlisted

- 46T Visual Information Equipment Operator-Maintainer
- 46S Public Affairs Mass Communications Specialist
- 46V Visual Information Specialist
- 46Z Chief Public Affairs NCO

== Academy Professor Functional Area (FA 47) ==
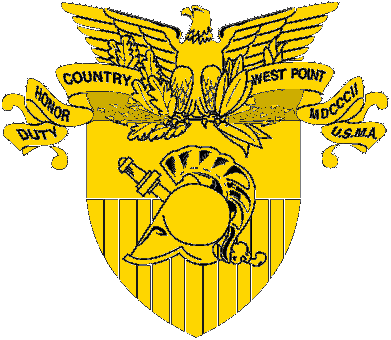

Officer

- 47A USMA, Professor
- 47C USMA, Professor of English
- 47D USMA, Professor of Electrical Engineering and Computer Science
- 47E USMA, Professor of Law
- 47F USMA, Professor of Systems Engineering
- 47G USMA, Professor of Foreign Languages
- 47H USMA, Professor of Physics
- 47J USMA, Professor of Social Sciences
- 47K USMA, Professor of History
- 47L USMA, Professor of Behavioral Sciences and Leadership
- 47M USMA, Professor of Chemistry
- 47N USMA, Professor of Mathematical Sciences
- 47P USMA, Professor of Geography and Environmental Engineering
- 47Q USMA, Professor and Associate Dean
- 47R USMA, Professor of Civil and Mechanical Engineering
- 47S USMA, Professor of Physical Education
- 47T USMA, Professor of Leader Development and Organizational Learning
- 47U USMA, Professor of Military Art and Science
- 47V USMA, Professor of Army Cyber

== Foreign Area Officer Functional Area (FA 48) ==
Officer

- 48B Latin America
- 48C Europe (no longer used—these officers are now designated 48E)
- 48D South Asia (no longer used—these officers are now designated 48P)
- 48E Eurasia
- 48F China (no longer used—these officers are now designated 48P)
- 48G Mideast/North Africa
- 48H Northeast Asia (no longer used—these officers are now designated 48P)
- 48I Southeast Asia (no longer used—these officers are now designated 48P)
- 48J Africa, South of the Sahara
- 48X Foreign Area Officer

== Operations Research/Systems Analysis (ORSA) Functional Area (FA 49) ==
Officer

- 49A Operations Research/Systems Analysis
- 49B Artificial Intelligence and Machine Learning (AI/ML) Officer
- ~~49W Trained, ORSA~~
- ~~49X Untrained, ORSA~~

== Force Management Functional Area (FA 50) ==
Officer

- 50A Force Development

== Army Acquisition Corps (FA and CMF 51) ==
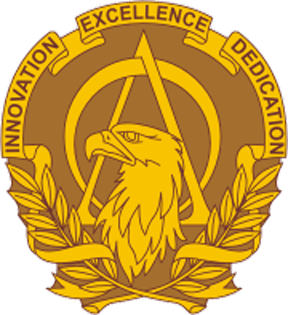

Officer

- 51A Program Management
- 51C Contract Management
- 51R Systems Automation Acquisition and Engineering
- 51S Research and Engineering
- 51T Test and Evaluation
- 51Z Acquisitions

Noncommissioned Officer

- 51C Acquisition, Logistics & Technology (AL&T) Contracting NCO

== Nuclear and Counter WMD Functional Area (FA 52) ==
Officer

- 52B Nuclear and Counter WMD Officer

== Chaplain Corps (CH) ==
Officer

- 56A Command and Unit Chaplain
- 56D Clinical Pastoral Educator
- 56X Chaplain Candidate

Enlisted

- 56M Religious Affairs Specialist

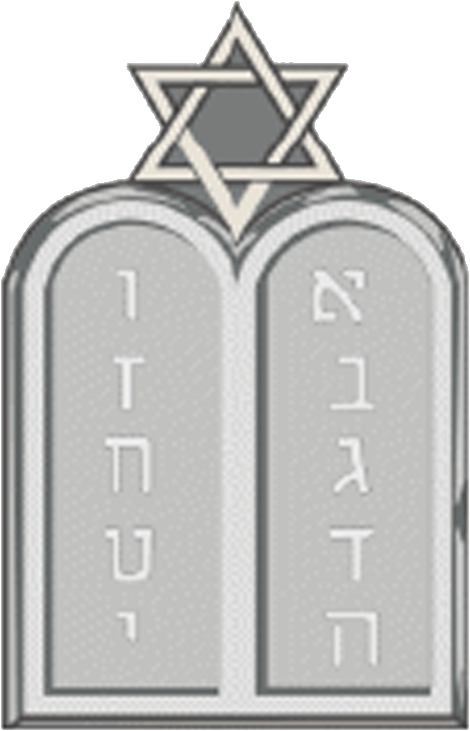
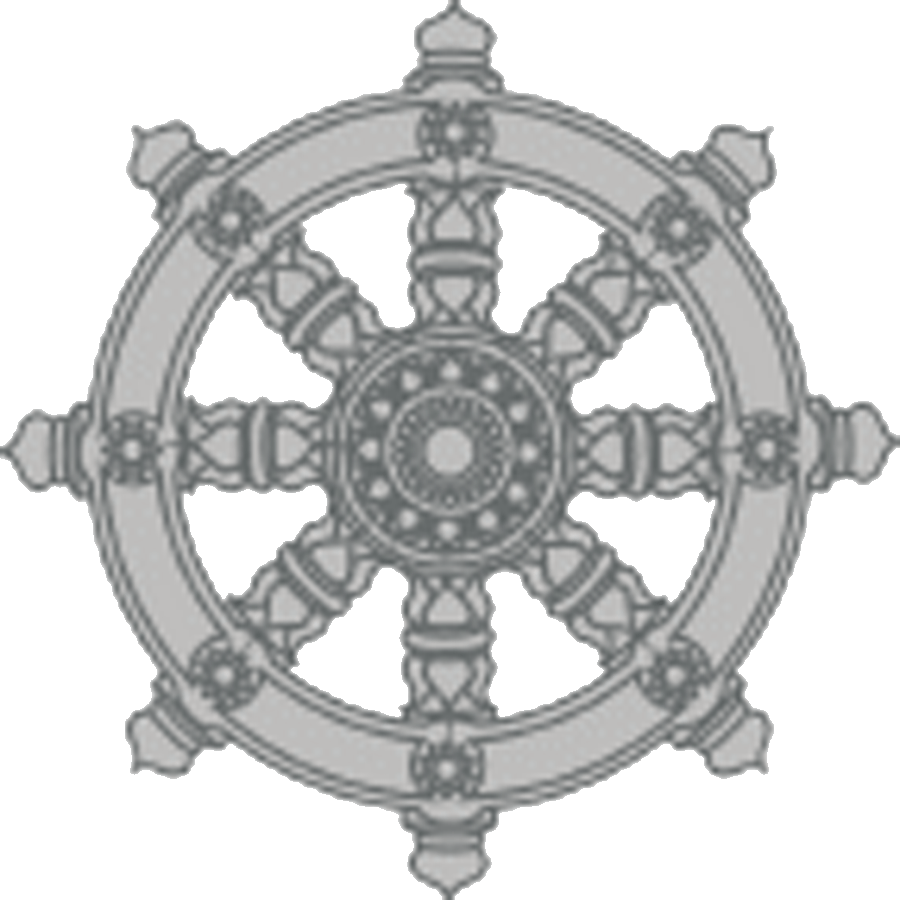
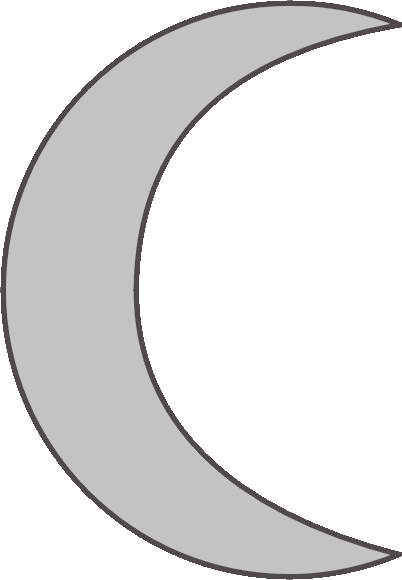
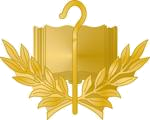
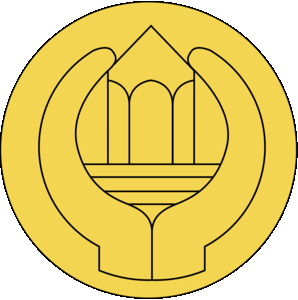

== Simulation Operations Functional Area (FA 57) ==
Officer

- 57A Simulation Operations Officer

== Army Marketing Functional Area (FA 58) ==
Officer

- 58A Army Marketing Officer

== Strategic Plans and Policy Functional Area (FA 59) ==
Officer

- 59A Strategist

== Medical Department Branches ==
=== Medical Corps (MC) ===
Officer

- 60A Operational Medicine
- 60B Nuclear Medicine Officer
- 60C Preventive Medicine Officer
- 60D Occupational Medicine Officer
- 60F Pulmonary Disease/Critical Care Officer
- 60G Gastroenterologist
- 60H Cardiologist
- 60J Obstetrician and Gynecologist
- 60K Urologist
- 60L Dermatologist
- 60M Allergist, Clinical Immunologist
- 60N Anesthesiologist
- 60P Pediatrician
- 60Q Pediatric Sub-Specialist
- 60R Child Neurologist
- 60S Ophthalmologist
- 60T Otolaryngologist
- 60U Child Psychiatrist
- 60V Neurologist
- 60W Psychiatrist
- 61A Nephrologist

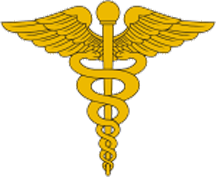

- 61B Medical Oncologist/Hematologist
- 61C Endocrinologist
- 61D Rheumatologist
- 61E Clinical Pharmacologist
- 61F Internist
- 61G Infectious Disease Officer
- 61H Family Medicine
- 61J General Surgeon
- 61K Thoracic Surgeon
- 61L Plastic Surgeon
- 61M Orthopedic Surgeon
- 61N Flight Surgeon
- 61P Physiatrist
- 61Q Radiation Oncologist
- 61R Diagnostic Radiologist
- 61U Pathologist
- 61W Peripheral Vascular Surgeon
- 61Z Neurosurgeon
- 62A Emergency Physician
- 62B Field Surgeon

=== Dental Corps (DC) ===
Officer

- 63A General Dentist
- 63B Comprehensive Dentist
- 63D Periodontist
- 63E Endodontist
- 63F Prosthodontist
- 63H Public Health Dentist

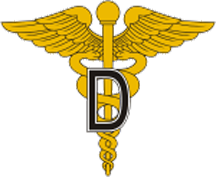

- 63K Pediatric Dentist
- 63M Orthodontist
- 63N Oral and Maxillofacial Surgeon
- 63P Oral Pathologist
- 63R Executive Dentist

=== Veterinary Corps (VC) ===
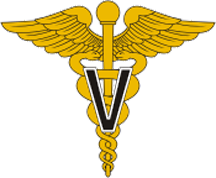

Officer

- 64A Field Veterinary Service
- 64B Veterinary Preventive Medicine
- 64C Veterinary Laboratory Animal Medicine
- 64D Veterinary Pathology
- 64E Veterinary Comparative Medicine
- 64F Veterinary Clinical Medicine
- 64Z Senior Veterinarian (Immaterial)

Warrant

- 640A Food Safety Officer

=== Medical Specialist Corps (SP) ===
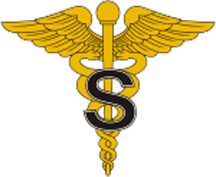

Officer

- 65A Occupational Therapy
- 65B Physical Therapy
- 65C Dietitian
- 65D Physician Assistant
- 65X Specialist Allied Operations

=== Nurse Corps (AN) ===
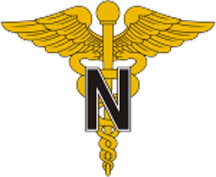

Officer

- 66B Public Health Nurse
- 66C Psychiatric/Mental Health Nurse
- 66E Perioperative Nurse
- 66F Nurse Anesthetist
- 66G Obstetrics and Gynecology
- 66H Medical-Surgical Nurse
- 66N Generalist Nurse
- 66P Family Nurse Practitioner
- 66R Psychiatric Nurse Practitioner
- 66S Critical Care Nurse
- 66T Emergency Room Nurse
- 66W Certified Nurse Midwife

Skill Identifier

- M9 Nurse Case Manager

=== Medical Service Corps (MS) ===
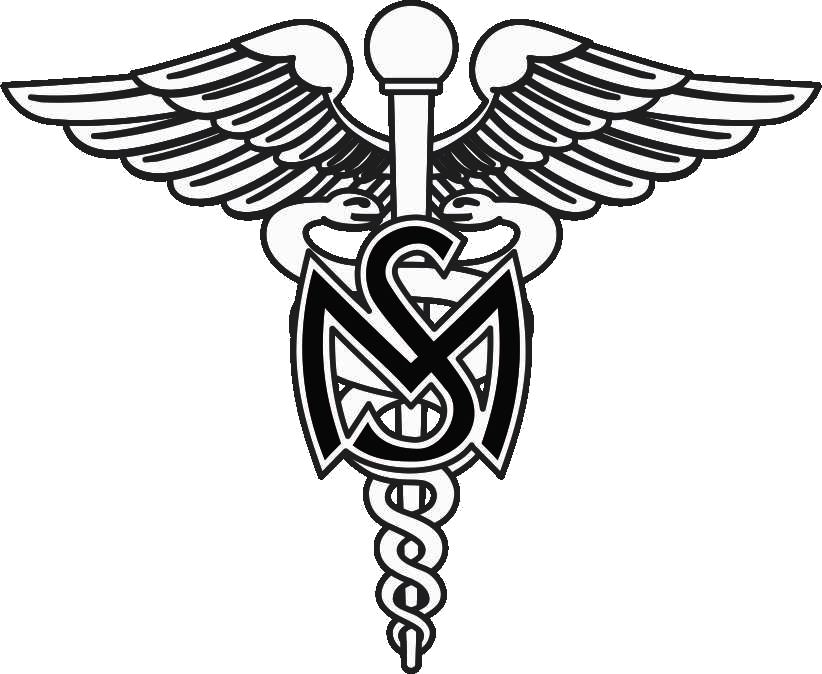

Officer

- 67A Health Services
- 71E Laboratory Sciences
- 67C Preventive Medicine Sciences
- 67D Behavioral Sciences
- 67E Pharmacy
- 67F Optometry
- 67G Podiatry
- 67J Aeromedical Evacuation

Warrant

- 670A Health Services Maintenance Technician

=== Medical CMF ===
Enlisted

- 68A Biomedical Equipment Specialist
- 68B Orthopedic Specialist
- 68C Practical Nursing Specialist-(LPN/LVN)
- 68D Operating Room Specialist
- 68E Dental Specialist
- 68F Physical Therapy Specialist
- 68G Patient Administration Specialist (formerly 71G)
- 68H Optical Laboratory Specialist
- 68J Medical Logistics Specialist
- 68K Medical Laboratory Specialist
- 68L Occupational Therapy Specialist
- 68M Nutrition Care Specialist
- 68N Cardiovascular Specialist ( Discontinued)
- 68P Radiology Specialist
- 68Q Pharmacy Specialist
- 68R Veterinary Food Inspection Specialist
- 68S Preventive Medicine Specialist
- 68T Animal Care Specialist
- 68U Ear, Nose, and Throat (ENT) Specialist (Discontinued)
- 68V Respiratory Specialist
- 68W Combat Medic Specialist
- 68X Behavioral Health Specialist
- 68Y Eye Specialist
- 68Z Chief Medical NCO

=== Health Services FA ===
Officer

- 70A Health Care Administration
- 70B Health Services Administration
- 70C Health Services Comptroller
- 70D Health Services Systems Management
- 70E Patient Administration
- 70F Health Services Human Resources
- 70H Health Services Plans, Operations, Intelligence, Security, and Training
- 70K Health Services Materiel

=== Laboratory Sciences FA ===
Officer

- 71A Microbiology
- 71B Biochemistry
- 71E Clinical Laboratory
- 71F Research Psychology

=== Preventive Medicine Sciences FA ===
Officer

- 72A Nuclear Medical Science
- 72B Entomology
- 72C Audiology
- 72D Environmental Science and Engineering

=== Behavioral Sciences FA ===
Officer

- 73A Social Work
- 73B Clinical Psychology

== Chemical Corps (CM) ==

Officer

- 74A Chemical, General

Warrant

- 740A Chemical, Biological, Radiological and Nuclear (CBRN) Warrant Officer

Enlisted

- 74D Chemical, Biological, Radiological and Nuclear (CBRN) Specialist (formerly 54B)

== Logistics Corps ==
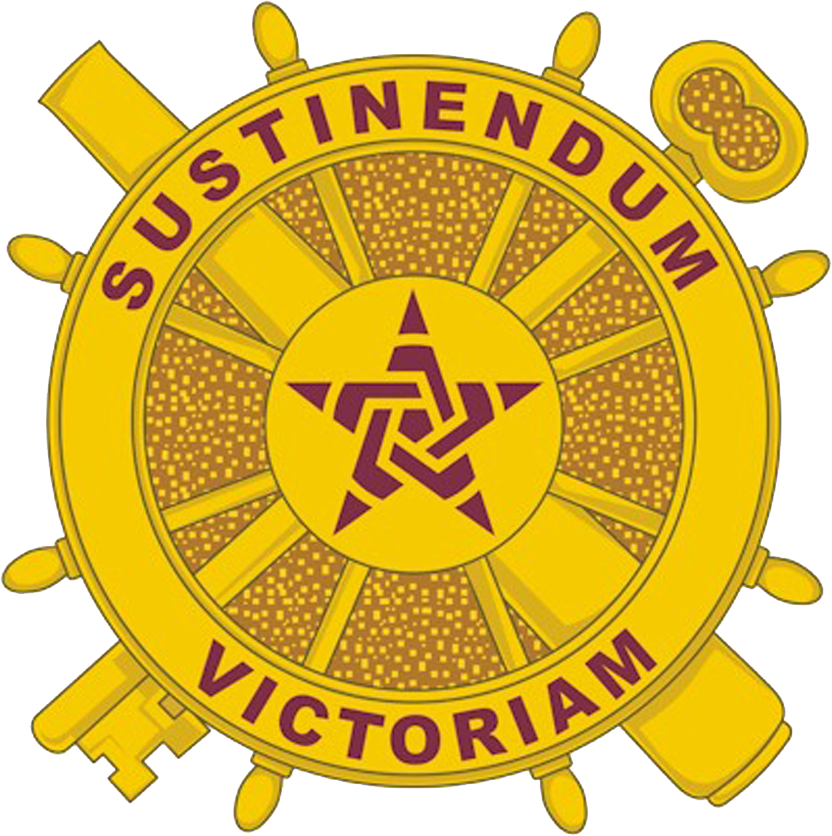

As of 1 Jan 2008, all officers from Quartermaster, Transportation and Ordnance branches who have attended the Captain's Career Course, with the exception of EOD officers (89E), are transitioned to the Logistics branch.

Officer

- 90A Multifunctional Logistician (LG)

=== Transportation Corps (TC) ===
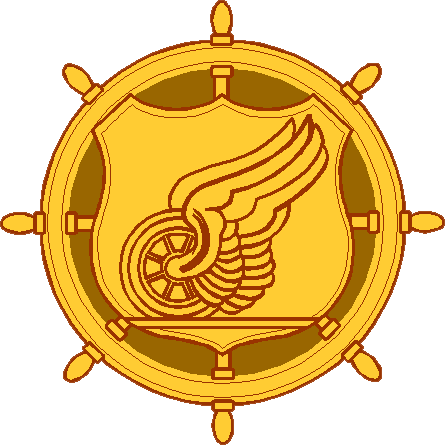

Officer

- 88A Transportation, General
- 88B Traffic Management
- 88C Marine and Terminal Operations
- 88D Motor/Rail Transportation

Warrant

- 880A Marine Deck Officer
- 881A Marine Engineering Officer
- 882A Mobility Officer

Enlisted

- 88H Cargo Specialist
- 88K Watercraft Operator
- 88L Watercraft Engineer
- 88M Motor Transport Operator
- 88N Transportation Management Coordinator
- 88P Railway Equipment Repairer (RC)
- 88T Railway Section Repairer (RC)
- 88U Railway Operations Crew Member (RC)
- 88Z Transportation Senior Sergeant

=== Ammunition CMF, Mechanical Maintenance CMF & Ordnance Branch (OD) ===

Officer

- 89E Explosive Ordnance Disposal Officer
- 91A Materiel Maintenance and Munitions Management Officer

Warrant

- 890A Ammunition Warrant Officer
- 913A Armament Systems Maintenance Warrant Officer
- 914A Allied Trades Warrant Officer
- 915A Automotive Maintenance Warrant Officer
- 915E Senior Automotive Maintenance Warrant Officer
- 919A Engineer Equipment Maintenance Warrant Officer
- 948B Electronic Systems Maintenance Warrant Officer
- 948D Electronic Missile Systems Maintenance Warrant Officer
- 948E Senior Electronics Maintenance Warrant Officer

Enlisted

- 89A Ammunition Stock Control and Accounting Specialist
- 89B Ammunition Specialist
- 89D Explosive Ordnance Disposal Specialist
- 91A M1 Abrams Tank System Maintainer (formerly 63E)
- 91B Wheeled Vehicle Mechanic (formerly 63B)
- 91C Utilities Equipment Repairer (formerly 52C)
- 91D Power Generation Equipment Repairer (formerly 52D)

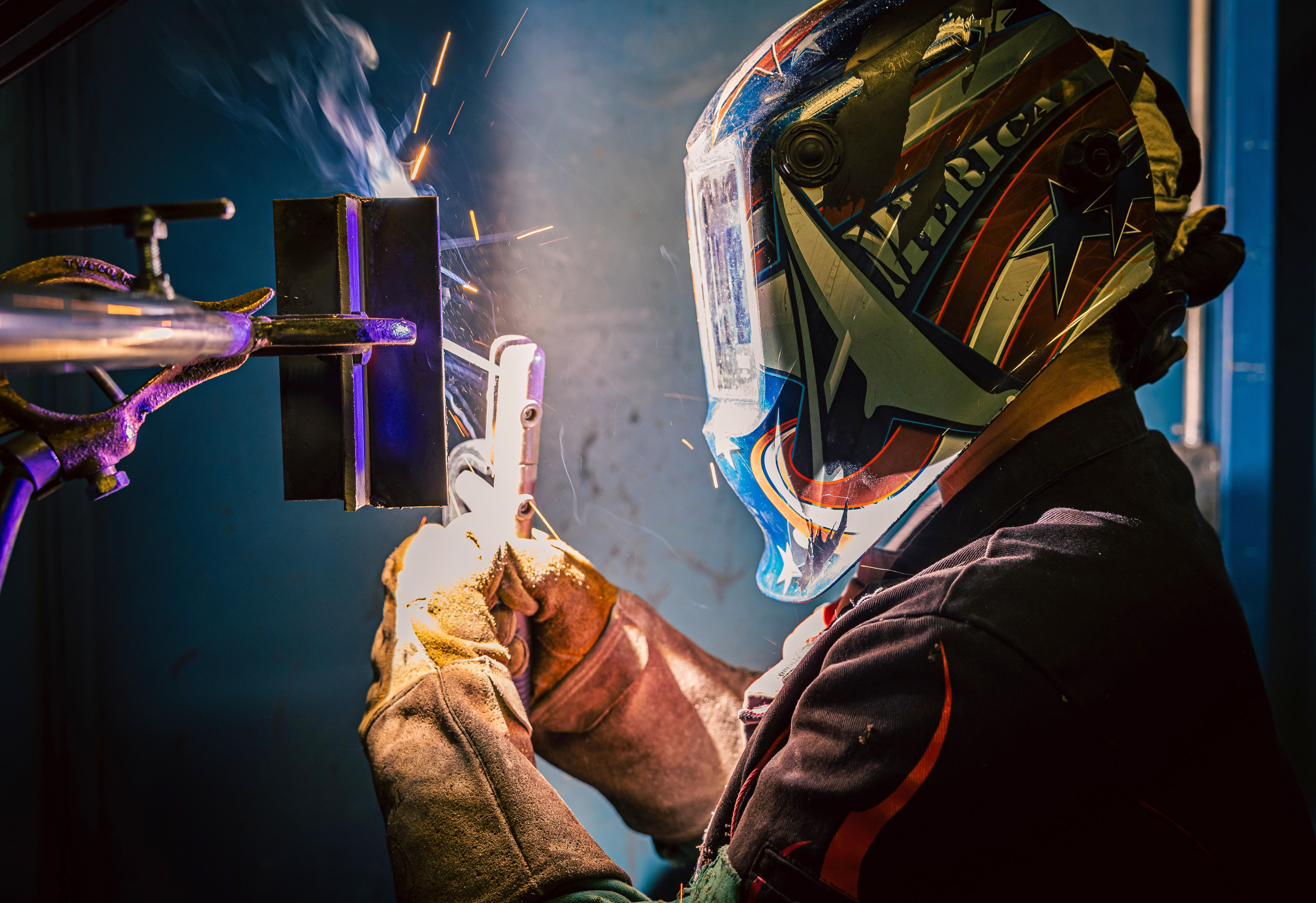
Soldier in training as 91E Allied Trades Specialist

- 91E Allied Trades Specialist (formerly 91E and 91W)
- 91F Small Arms/Towed Artillery Repairer (formerly 45B)
- ~~91G Fire Control Repairer (formerly 45G)~~
- 91H Track Vehicle Repairer (formerly 63H)
- 91J Quartermaster and Chemical Equipment Repairer (formerly 63J)
- 91L Construction Equipment Repairer (formerly 62B)
- 91M Bradley Fighting Vehicle System Maintainer (formerly 63T)
- 91P Self Propelled Artillery Systems Maintainer (formerly 63D)
- 91S Stryker Systems Maintainer
- 91X Maintenance Supervisor (formerly 63X)
- 91Z Senior Maintenance Supervisor (formerly 63Z)
- 94A Land Combat Electronic Missile System Repairer (formerly 27E)
- 94D Air Traffic Control Equipment Repairer
- 94E Radio & Communications Security (COMSEC) Equipment Repairer
- 94F Computer/Detection Systems Repairer
- 94H Test Measurement and Diagnostic Equipment (TMDE) Maintenance Support Specialist
- 94M Radar Repairer
- 94P Multiple Launch Rocket System (MLRS) Repairer (formerly 27M)
- 94R Avionic and Survivability Repairer
- 94S PATRIOT System Repairer
- 94T AVENGER System Repairer
- 94W Electronic Maintenance Chief (ARNG)
- ~~94X Senior Missile Systems Maintainer~~
- 94Y Integrated Family of Test Equipment (IFTE) Operator/Maintainer
- 94Z Senior Electronic Maintenance Chief

=== Quartermaster Corps (QM) ===
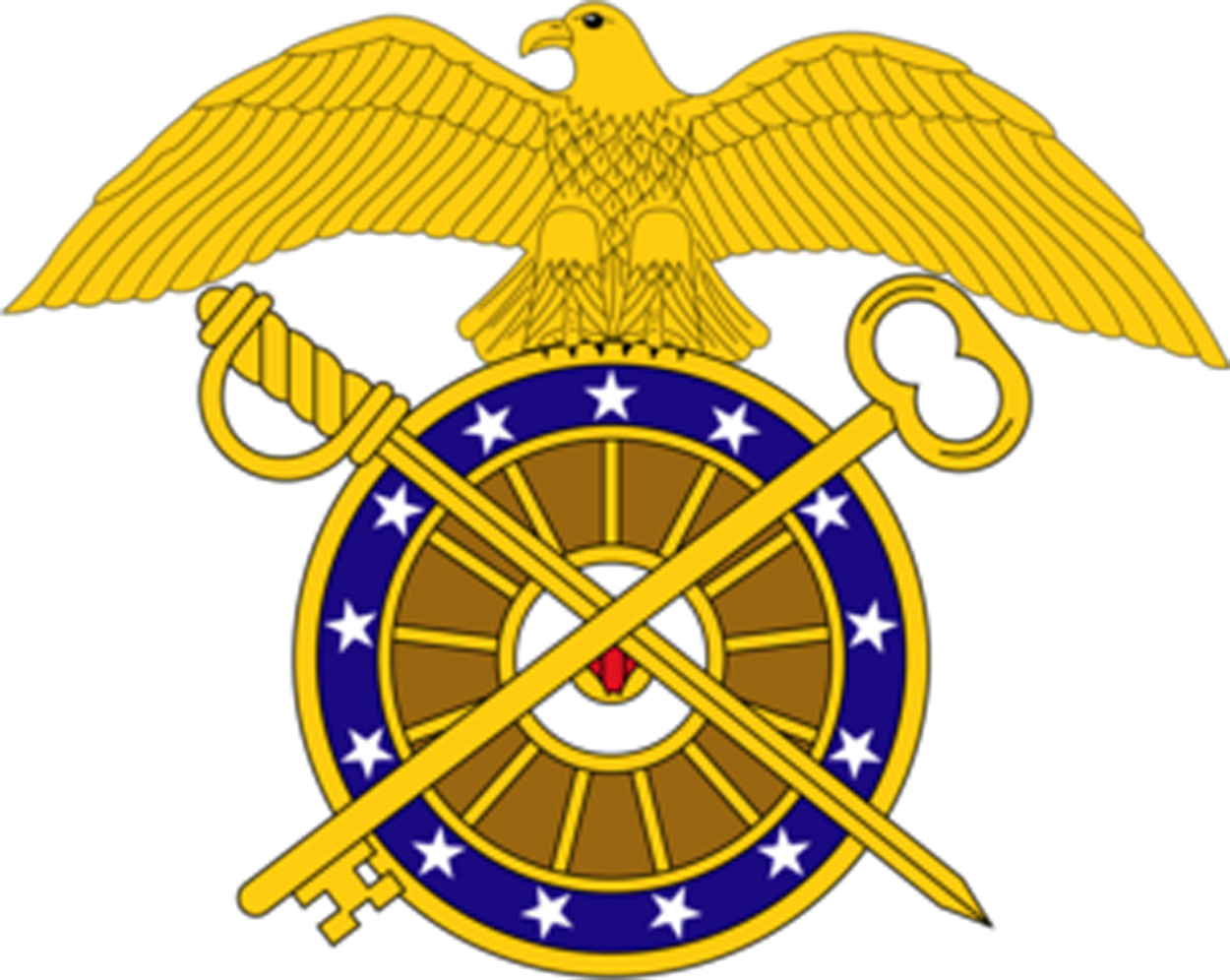

Officer

- 92A Quartermaster Officer
- 92D Aerial Delivery and Materiel

Warrant

- 920A Property Accounting Technician
- 920B Supply Systems Technician
- 921A Airdrop Systems Technician
- 922A Food Service Technician
- 923A Petroleum Systems Technician

Enlisted

- 92A Automated Logistical Specialist
- 92F Petroleum Supply Specialist
- 92G Culinary Specialist
- 92L Petroleum Laboratory Specialist
- 92M Mortuary Affairs Specialist
- 92R Parachute Rigger
- 92S Shower/Laundry and Clothing Repair Specialist (RC)
- 92W Water Treatment Specialist
- 92Y Unit Supply Specialist
- 92Z Senior Noncommissioned Logistician

== See also ==
- Air Force Specialty Code
- Badges of the United States Army
- United States Army branch insignia
- List of United States Coast Guard ratings
- List of United States Marine Corps MOS
- List of United States Naval officer designators
- List of United States Navy ratings
- List of United States Navy staff corps
