= SN 2003jb =

Supernova from the galaxy 3C 305

sn2003jb
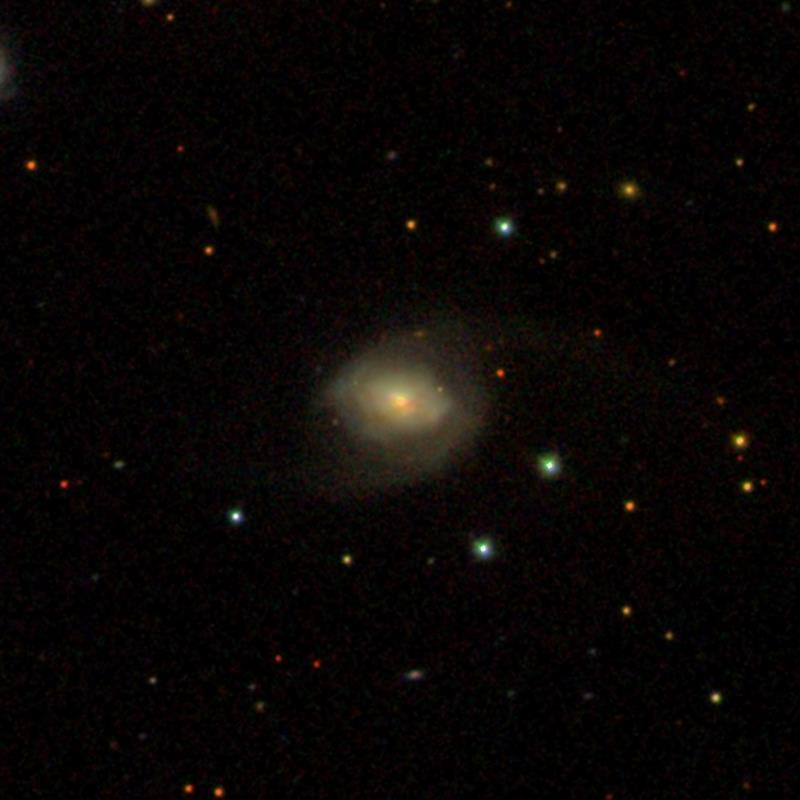
- 3C 305 is the host galaxy of this supernova
- Event type: Supernova
- SNIa
- Date: 2003-10-23
- Constellation: Draco
- Right ascension: 14:49:22.279
- Declination: +63:16:06.20
- Host: 3C 305
- Other designations: SN 2003jb

SN 2003jb was a supernova that occurred in the constellation of Draco in the host galaxy of 3C 305. The spectra matched a supernova of Type Ia.
