= 309th Military Intelligence Battalion (United States) =

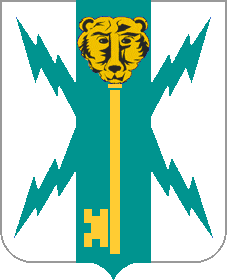
- Battalion coat of arms
- Active: 1952–1959 & 1962–1986 and 1990-present
- Country: United States
- Branch: United States Army, 1990-present U.S. Army Reserve, 1952–1986
- Type: Military Intelligence
- Role: Training, 1990-present Electronic Warfare, 1952–1986
- Part of: 111th Military Intelligence Brigade
- Garrison/HQ: Fort Huachuca, AZ 1990-present Patton USAR Ctr, Bell, CA 1962–86; Los Angeles 1952–1959
- Motto: "Sentinels of Security"

Commanders
- Current commander: LTC David R. Jaquith

Insignia
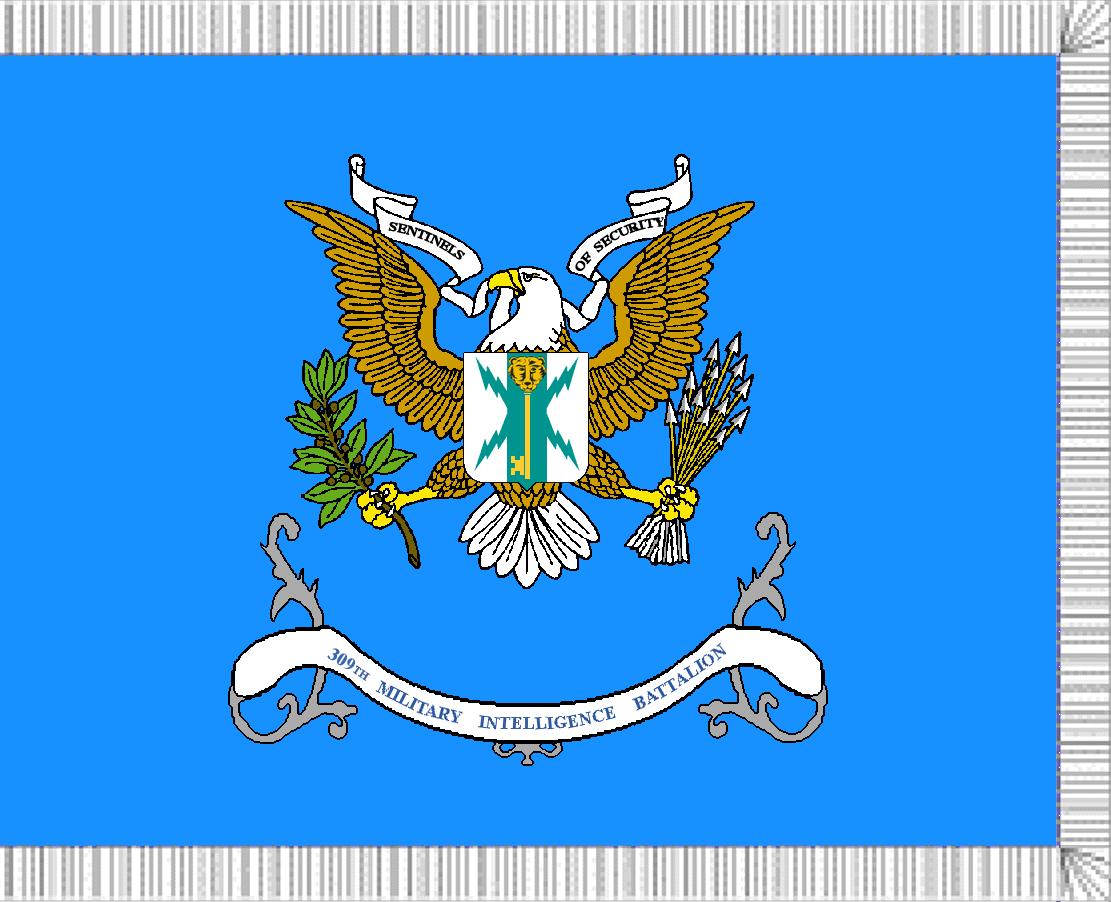
- 309th Military Intelligence Battalion colors 1990–

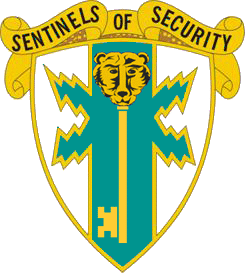
- 309th Military Intelligence Battalion distinctive unit insignia

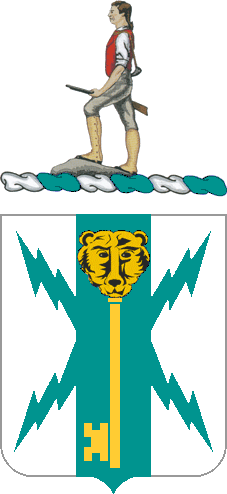
- 309th Army Security Agency Battalion coat of arms 1959–1986

The 309th Military Intelligence Battalion is a training unit of the United States Army. It aims to conduct initial entry, collective, and functional training to produce competent, disciplined, and physically fit military intelligence soldiers, instilled with the Army values, ready to join the Army at war.

== Current Mission ==
- Company A (nicknamed "Apaches") support and train Geospatial Intelligence Analysts (MOS 35G).
- Company B (nicknamed "Blackfoot") support and train human intelligence students in the Human Intelligence Collector (MOS 35M) course and the Linguist (MOS 09L) course as well as counterintelligence students in the Counterintelligence Special Agent Course (CISAC) and Counterintelligence Officer's Course (CIOC).
- Company C (nicknamed "Comanches") The company provides administrative and logistical support staff to the battalion, as well as support and train MI System Maintainers/Integrators (MOS 35T).

== Lineage ==
The official lineage of the 309th Military Intelligence Battalion from the Army Center of Military History is:

- Constituted 19 September 1952 in the Army Reserve as Headquarters and Headquarters Detachment, 309th Communication Reconnaissance Battalion.
- Activated 1 November 1952 at Los Angeles.
- Reorganized and redesignated 25 January 1956 as Headquarters and Headquarters Company, 309th Communication Reconnaissance Battalion (organic elements constituted 29 December 1955 – 4 March 1956 and activated 1 February 1956 – 5 March 1956).
- Redesignated 1 October 1956 as the 309th Army Security Agency Battalion.
- Inactivated 15 July 1959 at Los Angeles.
- Activated 15 September 1962 with headquarters at Bell, California.
- Companies A, B, C, and D reorganized and redesignated 15 August 1966 as the 518th, 519th, 520th, and 521st Army Security Agency Companies – hereafter separate lineages.
- Headquarters and Headquarters Company Inactivated 15 July 1986 at Bell, California.
- Redesignated 1 February 1990 as Headquarters and Headquarters Company, 309th Military Intelligence Battalion; concurrently withdrawn from the Army Reserve and allotted to the Regular Army.
- Headquarters transferred 17 August 1990 to the United States Army Training and Doctrine Command and activated at Fort Huachuca, Arizona as an element of the United States Army Intelligence Center's 111th Military Intelligence Brigade.

== Insignia ==
The official blazon as follows is from The Institute of Heraldry:

=== Distinctive unit insignia ===
- Description: A gold color metal and enamel device 1 5/32 inches (2.94 cm) in height overall, consisting of a shield blazoned as follows: Argent, on a pale emitting in saltire four lightning flashes Azure (Teal Blue) a key bit to dexter in base, the bow a bear's head, Or. Attached above the shield is a Gold triparted scroll inscribed "Sentinels of Security" in black letters.
- Symbolism: Teal blue and silver refer to the colors formerly used for the U.S. Army Security Agency. The key symbolizes the unit's mission which is providing security. The golden bear's head on the key represents California where the unit activated. The lightning flashes, symbolizing electricity, relate to the importance of electronic communications as part of the unit's functions.
- Background: The distinctive unit insignia was originally approved for the 309th Army Security Agency Battalion, Army Reserve on 12 February 1959. It was assigned for use by the 325th U.S. Army Security Agency Battalion on 5 August 1959. It was reassigned for the 309th U.S. Army Security Agency Battalion on 2 August 1965. The insignia was redesignated for the 309th Military Intelligence Battalion on 2 May 1990.

=== Coat of arms ===
- Shield: Argent, on a pale emitting in saltire four lightning flashes Azure (Teal Blue) a key ward to dexter in base, the bow a bear's head, Or.
- Crest:
  - 1990–present: None.
  - 1959–1986: That for the regiments and separate battalions of the Army Reserve: On a wreath of the colours, argent and azure, the Lexington Minuteman proper. The statue of the Minuteman, Capt. John Parker (Henry Hudson Kitson, sculptor), stands on the Common in Lexington, Massachusetts.
- Motto: "Sentinels of Security".
- Symbolism: Teal blue and white were the colors used for the U.S. Army Security Agency, the original designation of the organization. The key symbolizes the unit's mission—the guarding of security—and the golden bear's head on the key represents the State of California, where the unit was activated. The lightning flashes, symbolic of electricity, relate to the importance of electronic communications as part of the unit's functions.
- Background: The coat of arms was originally approved for the 309th Army Security Agency Battalion, Army Reserve, on 12 February 1959. It was assigned for use by the 325th U.S. Army Security Agency Battalion, Army Reserve on 5 August 1959. It was reassigned for use by the 309th U.S. Army Security Agency Battalion on 2 August 1965. It was cancelled on 6 June 1975. The coat of arms was reinstated and redesignated for the 309th Military Intelligence Battalion on 10 October 1995.
