= 3C 305 =

Galaxy in the constellation Draco

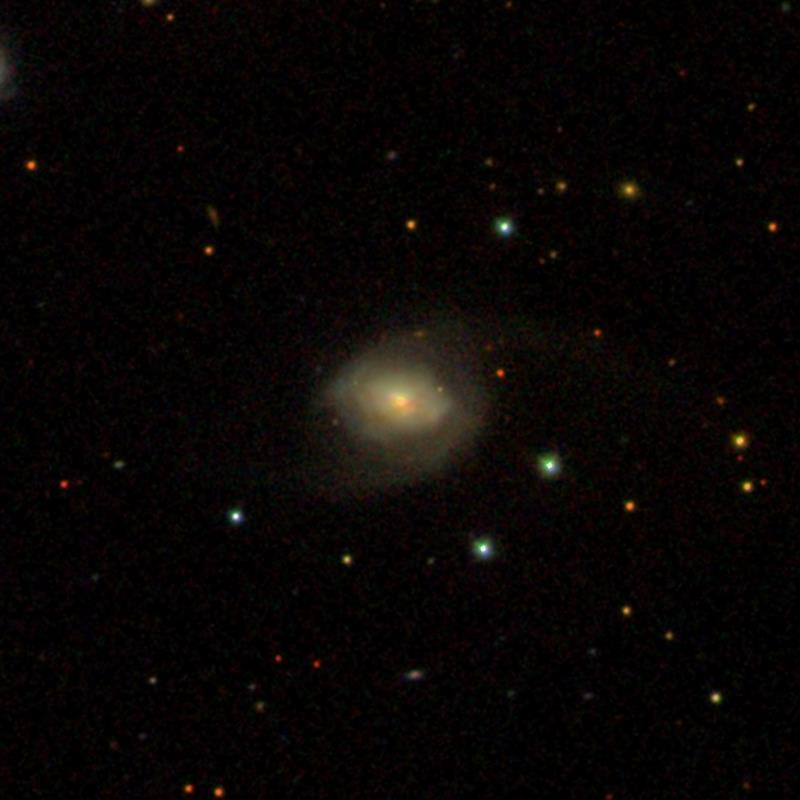

Observation data (J2000 epoch)
- Constellation: Draco
- Right ascension: 14^{h} 49^{m} 21.610^{s}
- Declination: +63° 16′ 14.24″
- Redshift: 0.041 639
- Heliocentric radial velocity: 12,503 km/s
- Distance: 577 Mly (176.9 Mpc)
- Apparent magnitude (V): 16.39

Characteristics
- Type: Sy2, Rad, G, QSO, AGN, X, IR; G, SB0, FR I, Sy 2
- Apparent size (V): 0.8753' x 0.497'

Other designations
- IC 1065, LEDA 52924, UGC 9553, 4C 63.21, MCG+11-18-008

3C 305, also known as IC 1065, is a lenticular galaxy located in the constellation Draco. The galaxy is located 577 million light-years away from Earth. It has an active galactic nucleus and is classified as a Seyfert 2 galaxy. This galaxy was discovered by American astronomer Lewis Swift on April 7, 1888.

3C 305 is also a radio galaxy. It shows an extended X-ray halo previously detected by Chandra X-ray and Very Large Array observations and hydrogen outflow with a jet power of ~10^{43} erg s^{−1}.

In additional, 3C 305 shows broad HI absorption levels, which researchers interpreted it as jet-cloud interaction. There are also signs that 3C 305 might be involved in a recent merger process with another gas-rich galaxy.

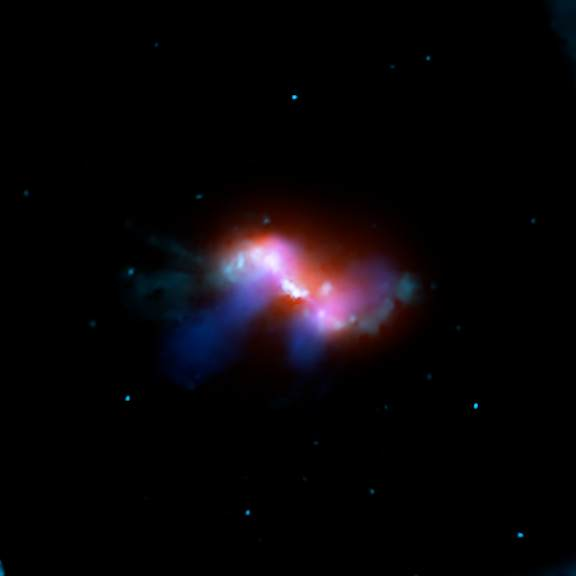
Chandra Image of 3C 305

== Supernova ==
One supernova has been observed in the galaxy so far: SN 2003jb, (type Ia, mag. 16.5), discovered in December 2003.
