= 305th Military Intelligence Battalion (United States) =

US Army intelligence training unit

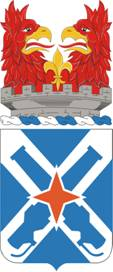
- Coat of Arms
- Active: 1950–1959; 1990–present
- Country: United States
- Branch: United States Army
- Type: Military Intelligence unit
- Part of: 111th Military Intelligence Brigade
- Garrison/HQ: Fort Huachuca, Arizona
- Motto(s): Ad Arcana Tutanda - To Keep Official Secrets Safe

Commanders
- Current commander: LTC Gilbert Juarez
- Command Sergeant Major: CSM James Kang

Insignia
- Distinctive Unit Insignia

The 305th Military Intelligence Battalion is part of the United States Army's 111th Military Intelligence Brigade located at Fort Huachuca, Arizona. It consists of three companies: A-Alpha Company, B-Bravo Company, and C-Charlie Company. The battalion's primary mission is to train Initial Entry Training soldiers for military occupational specialties 35F (All Source Intelligence Analyst).

== History and lineage ==
=== Lineage ===
- Constituted 17 November 1950 in the Organized Reserve Corps as Headquarters and Headquarters Detachment, 305th Communication Reconnaissance Battalion.
- Activated 23 January 1951 at Atlanta, Georgia.
- Consolidated 17 July 1951 with the 3255th Signal Service Company and consolidated unit designated as Headquarters and Headquarters Detachment, 305th Communication Reconnaissance Battalion.
- Reorganized and redesignated 24 January 1956 as Headquarters and Headquarters Company, 305th Communication Reconnaissance Battalion (362d Communication Reconnaissance Company [constituted 18 November 1955 in the Army Reserve] concurrently redesignated as Company A and activated at Wilmington, North Carolina).
- Redesignated 1 October 1956 as the 305th Army Security Agency Battalion.
- Inactivated 15 June 1959 at Atlanta, Georgia.
- Redesignated 1 February 1990 as the 305th Military Intelligence Battalion; concurrently withdrawn from the Army Reserve and allotted to the Regular Army.
- Headquarters transferred 18 May 1990 to the United States Army Training and Doctrine Command and activated at Fort Devens, Massachusetts.
- Relocated fall, 1993 as part of the 112th Military Intelligence Brigade and assigned to the 111th Military Intelligence Brigade at Fort Huachuca, Arizona.

=== Campaign participation ===
World War II: Northern France, Rhineland, Ardennes-Alsace, and Central Europe.

== Coat of arms ==
=== Description ===
Shield: Azure a saltire Argent charged with pyrotechnic projectors of the first, overall a mullet of four points Tenné fimbriated of the second.

Crest: On a wreath of the colors Argent and Azure issuant from the battlements of a tower Proper a fleur-de-lis Or between two griffin heads respectant Gules beaked Or.

Motto: AD ARCANA TUTANDA (To Keep Official Secrets Safe).

=== Symbolism ===
Shield: Teal blue and white are the colors associated with the former Army Security Agency Battalion. The pyrotechnic projectors allude to the signal and reconnaissance missions of the unit. The four-pointed star refers to the four battle honors awarded for service in World War II and also symbolizes intelligence, reconnaissance, communications and signal, vital functions of the battalion. The color orange further alludes to its signal function.

Crest: The tower symbolizes a strong defense and military preparedness. The griffins, personifying vigilance, stand prepared to meet all threats. Red denotes courage and zeal. The tower and fleur-de-lis commemorate the unit's World War II service in Northern Europe.

Background: The coat of arms was originally approved for the 305th Army Security Agency Battalion on 27 September 1957. It was redesignated for the 305th Military Intelligence Battalion and amended to add a crest on 5 October 1990.
