= Lectionary 305 =

Lectionary ℓ 305
- New Testament manuscript
- Text: Evangelistarium †
- Date: 12th century
- Script: Greek
- Found: 1876
- Now at: Cambridge University Library
- Size: 25.5 cm by 20.8 cm
- Type: Byzantine text-type

Lectionary 305 (Gregory-Aland), designated by siglum ℓ 305 (in the Gregory-Aland numbering) is a Greek manuscript of the New Testament, on parchment. Palaeographically it has been assigned to the 12th century. The manuscript is lacunose.

== Description ==
The original codex contained lessons from the Gospels (Evangelistarium), on 171 parchment leaves, with some lacunae. The leaves are measured (25.5 cm by 20.8 cm). It begins at Matthew 7:10.

The text is written in Greek minuscule letters, in one column per page, 18 lines per page. The manuscript contains Gospel lessons for selected days only.

The initial letters are in red.

== History ==
Gregory dated the manuscript to the 12th century. It has been assigned by the Institute for New Testament Textual Research (INTF) to the 12th century.

F. S. Ellis bought it 1870.

The manuscript was added to the list of New Testament manuscripts by Frederick Henry Ambrose Scrivener (291^{e}) and Caspar René Gregory (number 305^{e}). It was examined by Hort. Gregory saw it in 1883.

The codex is housed at the Cambridge University Library (MS Add.679.2) in Cambridge.

== See also ==
- List of New Testament lectionaries
- Biblical manuscript
- Textual criticism
- Lectionary 176

== Bibliography ==
- Gregory, Caspar René (1900). Textkritik des Neuen Testaments, Vol. 1. Leipzig: J.C. Hinrichs’sche Buchhandlung. p. 413.
