= 305 Squadron =

305 Squadron or 305th Squadron may refer to:

- No. 305 Polish Bomber Squadron, a Polish World War II unit in the United Kingdom
- 305th Tactical Fighter Squadron (JASDF), Japan
- 305th Air Refueling Squadron, United States Air Force
- 305th Expeditionary Airlift Squadron, United States Air Force
- 305th Fighter Squadron, United States Army Air Forces
- 305th Rescue Squadron, United States Air Force
- VFA-305, United States Navy
