= 305 (film) =

- Theatrical poster
- Directed by: Daniel Holechek; David M. Holechek
- Written by: David M. Holechek; Brandon Tyra
- Produced by: David M. Holechek
- Starring: Brandon Tyra; Tim Larson; David Leo Schultz
- Music by: Hanna Lim
- Distributed by: Allumination FilmWorks; Peach Arch Entertainment
- Release dates: March 7, 2008 (Fargo Film Festival); July 8, 2008 (United States)
- Running time: 84 minutes
- Country: United States
- Language: English

305 is a 2008 American mockumentary film about a group of five Spartans charged with protecting a goat path. The film began life as a digital short that became a huge hit on YouTube in June 2007, racking up over 4 million views in a few months. It premiered March 7, 2008 at the Fargo Film Festival, and was released direct-to-video on DVD July 8, 2008 by Allumination FilmWorks and Peace Arch Entertainment, the DVD distributors of the #1 syndicated court show Judge Judy. Prior to its release, the film screened at film festivals across the United States and United Kingdom including the 2008 Newport Beach Film Festival and 2008 Palm Beach International Film Festival. The film was selected by filmbio IndiFilms as a participant in its "Spotlight" program in conjunction with the Palm Beach International Film Festival and was featured on the filmbio IndiFilms website. The film received the "Zeilig Award For Innovation" at the 2008 MockFest in Hollywood, CA.

The entire film was shot against a digital backdrop (greenscreen) in studios around Orange County, California. Directors Daniel and David Holechek were contracted by Vanguard Cinema in the Fall of 2007 to expand the short film into a feature-length film. Production began in September 2007 and lasted until November of the same year.

== Plot ==
The film is presented as a "found footage" mockumentary, following five of Sparta's most incompetent citizens: Claudius, Darryl, Demetrius the Blind, Shazaam, and Testicleese. While King Leonidas leads the legendary 300 Spartans to the Battle of Thermopylae, these five men are deemed unfit for frontline combat. Instead, they are assigned the seemingly menial task of guarding a remote goat path that leads behind the Spartan lines.

The group is characterized by their complete lack of military discipline and individual quirks: Claudius is a delusional leader; Darryl acts as a sycophantic "assistant captain"; Demetrius is literally blind; Shazaam is a Persian living in Sparta due to "zoning laws"; and Testicleese is the only one with any actual physical strength, though he is socially inept.

While at their post, the group becomes distracted by petty bickering and personal antics. Because they fail to stay at their station, a Persian scout discovers the goat path. This allows the Persian army to outflank the 300 Spartans, leading directly to the massacre of Leonidas and his men. When the five "warriors" realize what has happened, they return to Sparta, only to find themselves the target of intense public ridicule and shame for being the cause of the greatest military defeat in Spartan history.

Exiled from the city's social circles and desperate to restore their honor, the quintet decides to launch a rogue mission to stop the advancing Persian army themselves. Lacking standard military equipment, they arm themselves with absurd household items, including a sharpened carrot, a rolling pin, and a rhythmic gymnastics ribbon.

During their journey, they encounter various obstacles and Persian scouts, whom they manage to defeat more through accidental luck and the Persians' own confusion than through actual skill. They eventually reach the Persian camp and attempt to assassinate the "God-King" Xerxes. Though their plan is chaotic and involves a series of slapstick mishaps, they manage to create enough of a disruption to hinder the Persian advance. In the end, while they do not become the legendary heroes they envisioned, they find a sense of self-worth and camaraderie, proving that even the most inept individuals can have an impact on history.

== Characters ==
- Claudius, the leader of the 5 Spartans who becomes a prisoner of war.
- Darryl, the Dwight Schrute reminiscent Assistant captain.
- Testicleese, the only non-inept member of the five.
- Shazaam, a Spartan whose house is in Persia, but due to zoning laws was able to go to a Spartan school.
- Demetrius, a recently blinded Spartan due to a battle/work related incident.
- Aurillia, an old friend of Testicleese who convinces him to save Claudius.
