= 111th Military Intelligence Brigade =

111th Military Intelligence Brigade (MIB)
- 111th MIB shoulder sleeve insignia
- Active: 1946 - present
- Country: United States
- Branch: United States Army
- Type: Military Intelligence
- Role: Training
- Part of: U.S. Army Intelligence Center of Excellence
- Garrison/HQ: Fort Huachuca

Commanders
- Brigade Commander: COL. Patrick Schorpp

Insignia
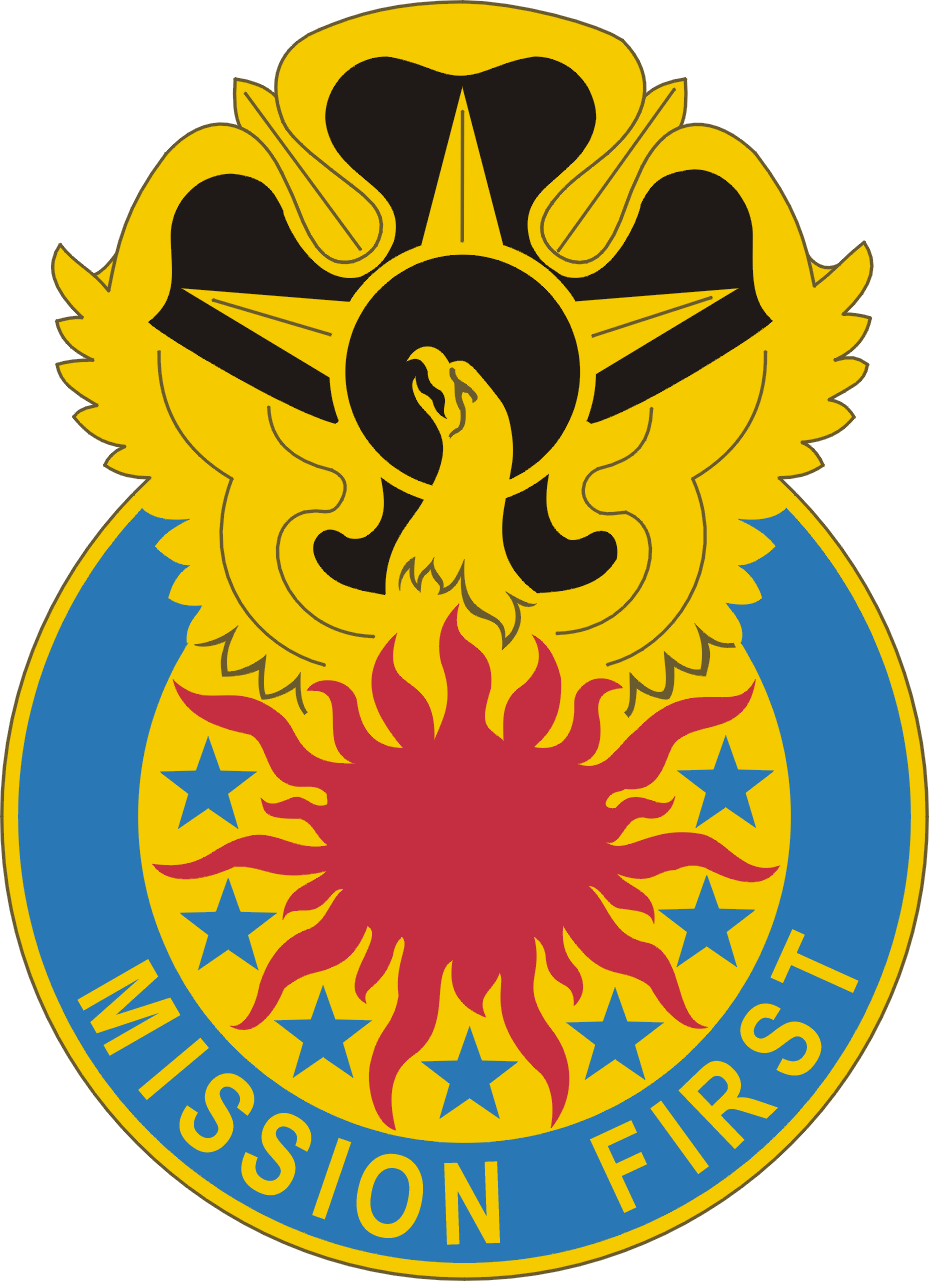
- Distinctive unit insignia

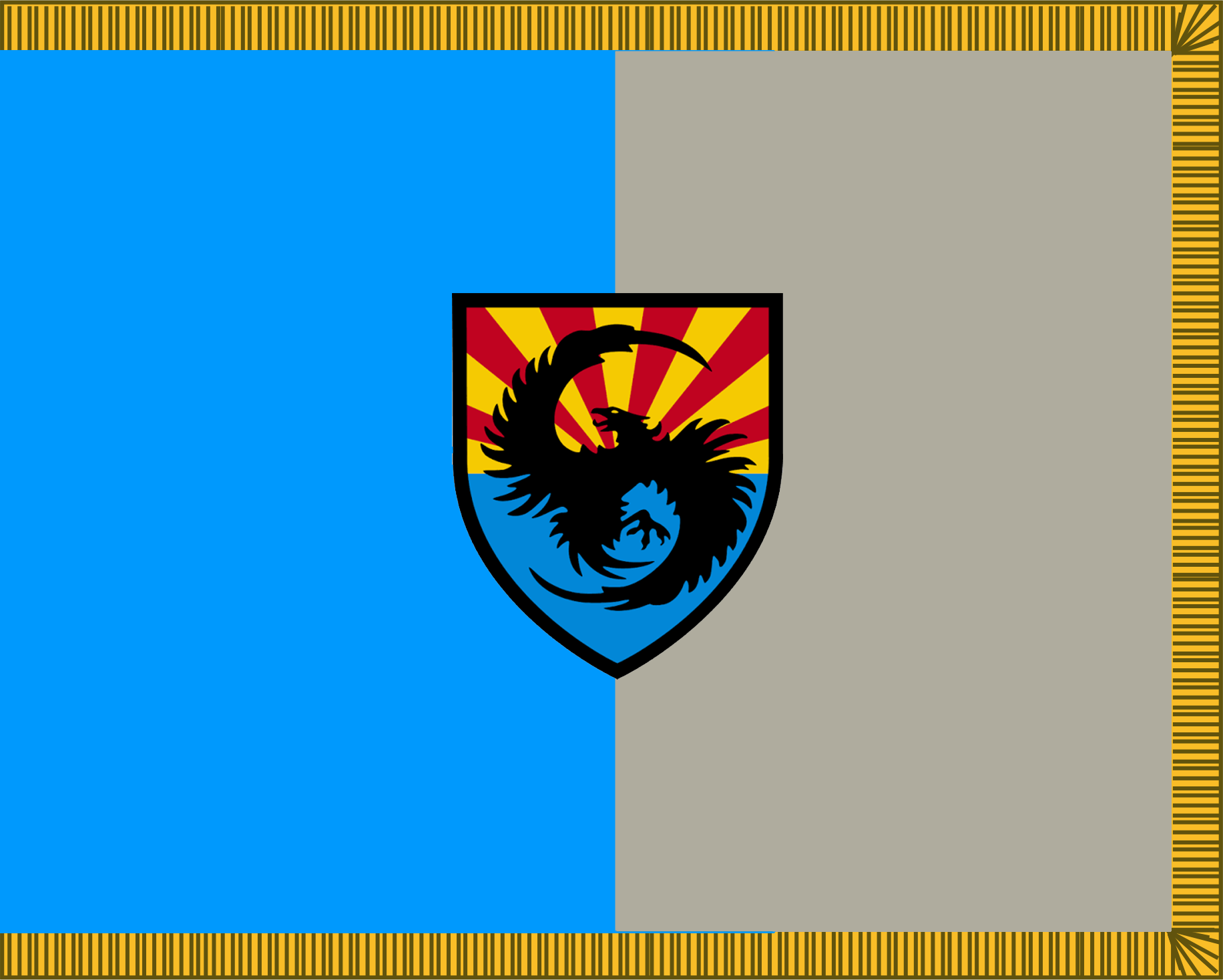
- 111th Military Intelligence Brigade Flag

The 111th Military Intelligence Brigade is a training brigade of the U.S. Army's Intelligence Center of Excellence under U.S. Army Training and Doctrine Command located at Fort Huachuca, Arizona. The brigade has overall responsibility for four battalions who focus primarily on training Military Intelligence Corps soldiers.

Subordinate units:

- Headquarters & Headquarters Company
- 304th Military Intelligence Battalion
- 305th Military Intelligence Battalion
- 309th Military Intelligence Battalion
- 344th Military Intelligence Battalion

== Lineage ==
- Constituted 10 May 1946 in the Army of the United States as the 111th Counter Intelligence Corps Detachment
- Activated 22 May 1946 at Atlanta, Georgia
- Allotted 6 October 1950 to the Regular Army
- Redesignated 1 December 1958 as the 111th Counter Intelligence Corps Group
- Redesignated 25 July 1961 as the 111th Intelligence Corps Group
- Redesignated 15 October 1966 as the 111th Military Intelligence Group
- Inactivated 9 January 1973 at Fort McPherson, Georgia
- Redesignated 13 March 1987 as Headquarters, 111th Military Intelligence Brigade; concurrently transferred to the United States Army Training and Doctrine Command and activated at Fort Huachuca, Arizona
