= 305 series =

Japanese train type

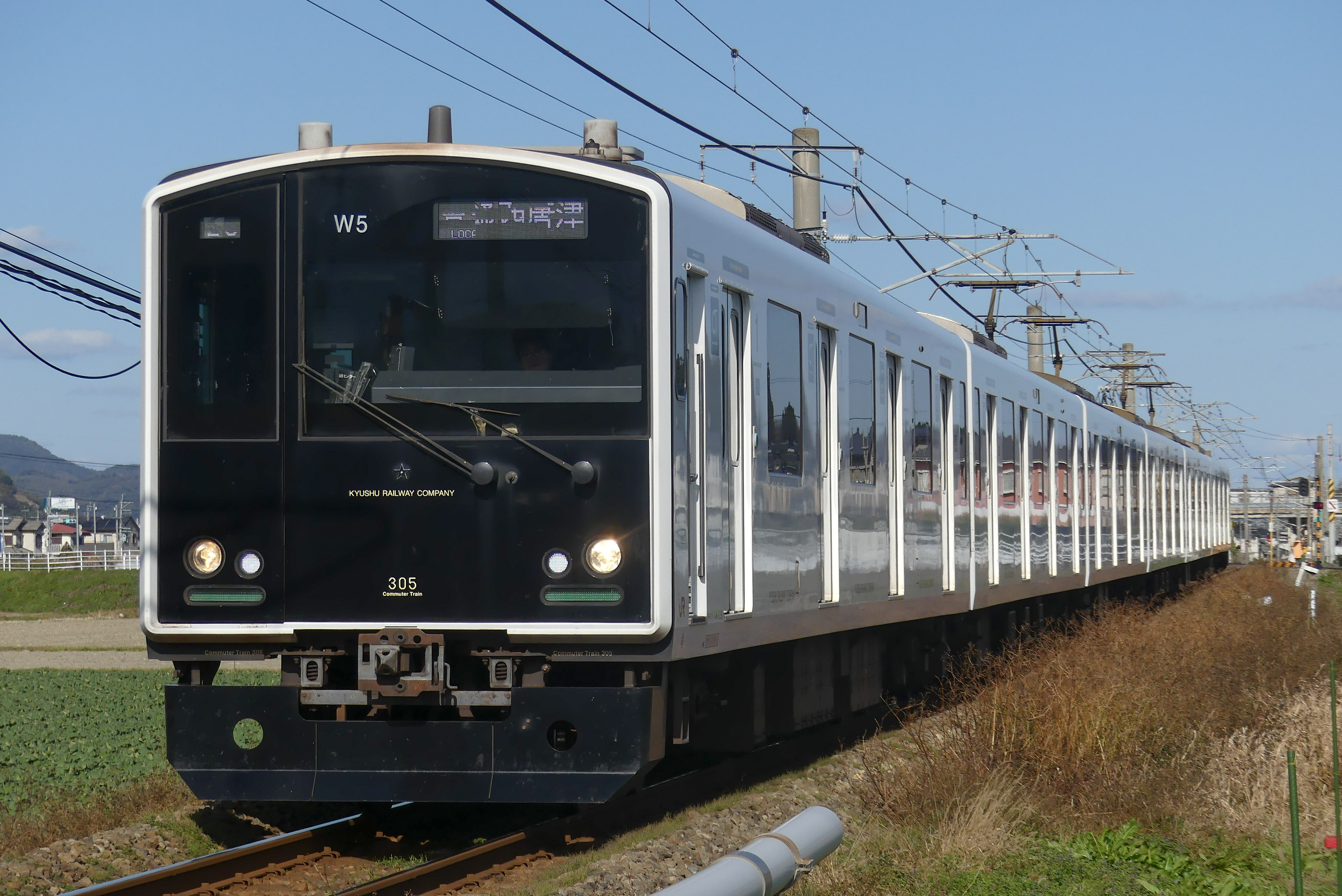
- 305 series set W5 on the Chikuhi Line in January 2019
- In service: 2015–present
- Manufacturer: Hitachi Rail
- Built at: Kudamatsu, Yamaguchi
- Family name: A-train
- Replaced: 103-1500 series
- Constructed: 2014–2015
- Entered service: 5 February 2015
- Number built: 36 vehicles (6 sets)
- Number in service: 36 vehicles (6 sets)
- Formation: 6 cars per trainset
- Fleet numbers: W1–W6
- Capacity: 851
- Operator: JR Kyushu
- Depot: Karatsu
- Lines served: Chikuhi Line; Fukuoka City Subway Airport Line

Specifications
- Car body construction: Aluminium alloy
- Car length: 20,250 mm (66 ft 5 in) (end cars); 20,000 mm (65 ft 7 in) (intermediate cars)
- Width: 2,800 mm (9 ft 2 in)
- Height: 4,050 mm (13 ft 3 in)
- Floor height: 1,125 mm (3 ft 8.3 in) (1,140 mm (3 ft 9 in) for car 1)
- Doors: 4 pairs per side
- Maximum speed: 110 km/h (68 mph) (design); 85 km/h (53 mph) (service)
- Traction system: Toshiba PC406K IGBT–VVVF
- Traction motors: 16 × Toshiba MT403K 150 kW (201 hp) permanent-magnet synchronous motor
- Power output: 2.4 MW (3,218 hp)
- Electric systems: 1,500 V DC Overhead catenary
- Current collection: Pantograph
- Safety systems: ATS-SK, ATC, ATO
- Track gauge: 1,067 mm (3 ft 6 in)

The 305 series (305系) is a DC electric multiple unit (EMU) commuter train type operated by Kyushu Railway Company (JR Kyushu) on the Chikuhi Line and Fukuoka City Subway Airport Line through-running services in Kyushu, Japan, since 5 February 2015. The entire fleet of 6 six-car sets (36 vehicles) was scheduled to be in service by the start of the 14 March 2015 timetable revision.

== Design ==
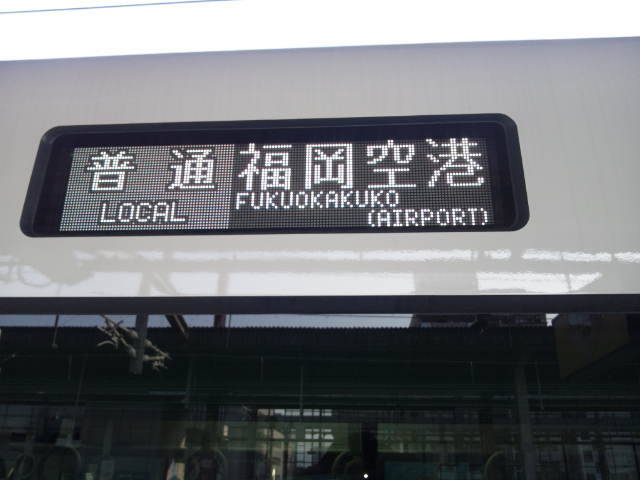
An LED destination indicator on the side

The fleet of 36 vehicles (6 six-car sets) will be built by Hitachi at a cost of approximately 5.7 billion yen, with styling overseen by industrial designer Eiji Mitooka. The new trains are designed to offer improved universal accessibility. Fully enclosed permanent-magnet synchronous motors (PMSM) are used to reduce environmental noise and reduce power consumption by approximately 57% compared with existing 103 series trains.

== Operations ==
The 305 series trains are used on through services between Nishi-Karatsu the Chikuhi Line and Fukuoka Airport on the Fukuoka City Subway Airport Line, replacing older 103-1500 series sets.

== Formations ==
The 305 series trains are formed as six-car sets as shown below, numbered W1 to W6, consisting of four motored intermediate cars and two non-powered driving trailer cars. Car 1 is at the Nishi-Karatsu end.

Car No.	1	2	3	4	5	6
Designation	Tc	M	Mp	M1	M1p	T'c
Numbering	KuHa 305	MoHa 305-0	MoHa 304-0	MoHa 305-100	MoHa 304-100	KuHa 304
Weight (t)	29.5	33.0	30.8	33.0	30.7	27.3
Capacity (total/seated)	128/42	147/51	147/51	147/51	147/51	135/45

Cars 3 and 5 each have two PS402K single-arm pantographs.

== Interior ==
Passenger accommodation consists of longitudinal bench seating with space for wheelchairs or strollers in each car. Each row of seats has a different seat cover design. Large liquid-crystal display screens are used for providing passenger information, and LED lighting is used throughout. Car 1 features wooden flooring of the same design as that used in JR Kyushu's luxury cruising train Seven Stars in Kyushu. Car 1 also has a universal access toilet. The side doors are equipped with passenger-operated open/close buttons, and these are normally available for use between Misakigaoka and Nishi-Karatsu stations on the Chikuhi Line.

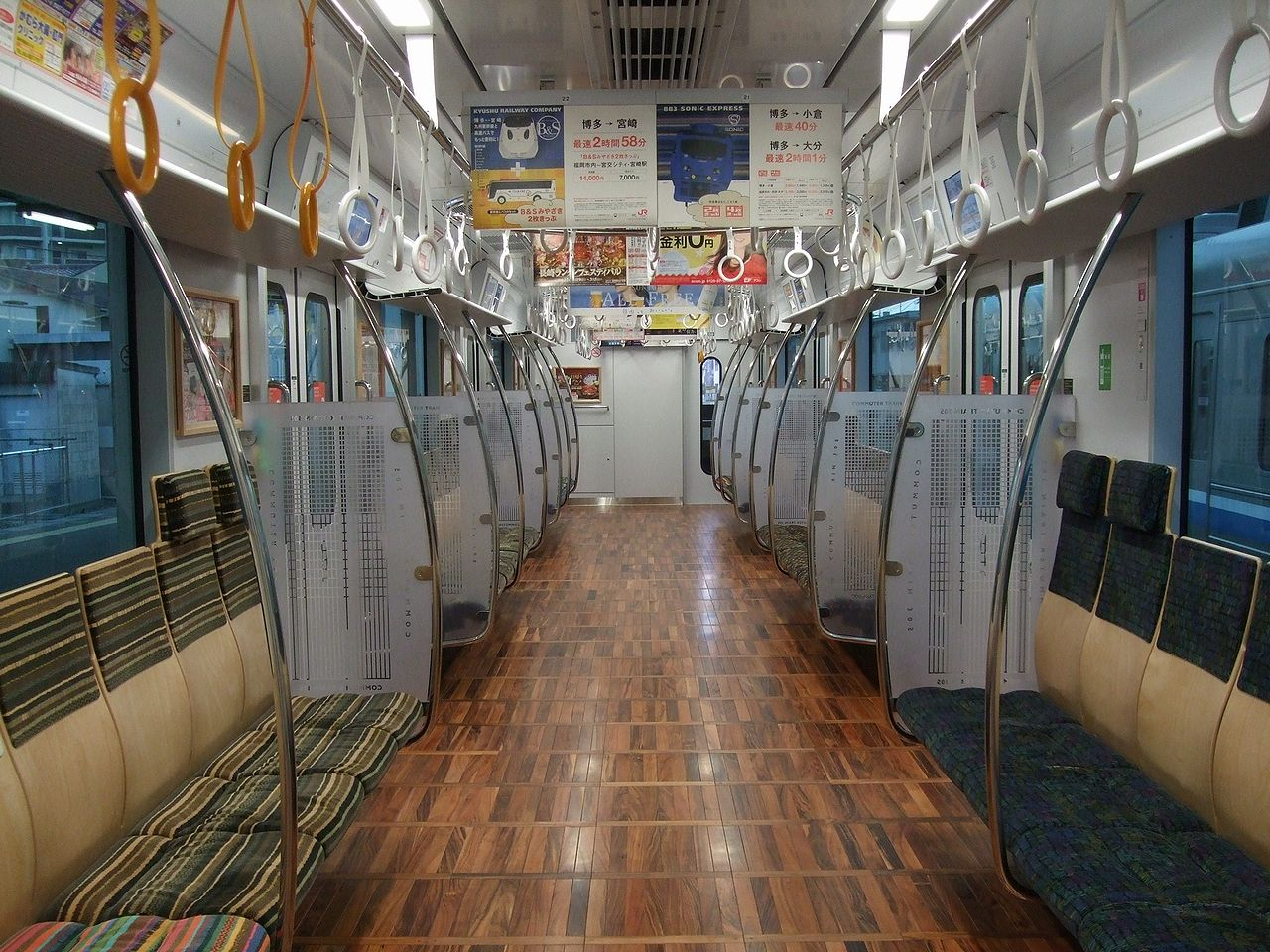
The interior of KuHa 305-3 (car 1 of set W3) with wooden flooring, February 2015

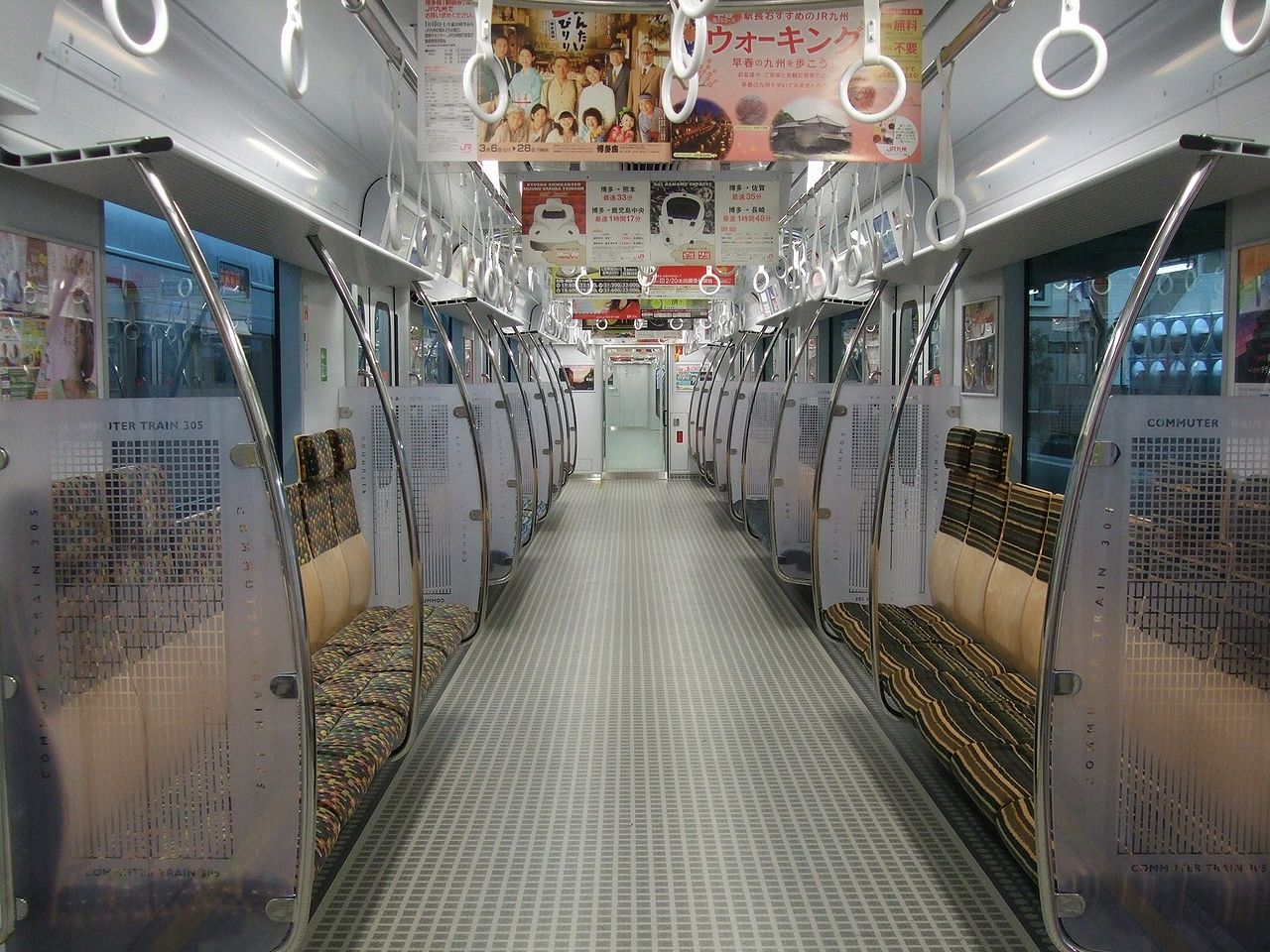
The interior of MoHa 305-3 (car 2 of set W3) with conventional flooring, February 2015

== History ==
The first set, numbered W1, was delivered from the manufacturer Hitachi in Kudamatsu, Yamaguchi to JR Kyushu's Kokura Depot in November 2014, and moved to Karatsu Depot in December 2014.

A special public preview run was held on 31 January 2015, ahead of the formal entry into service on 5 February.

== Fleet details ==
As of 1 October 2015, the fleet consists of six sets as follows.

Set No.	Date delivered
W1	15 December 2014
W2	18 December 2014
W3	9 February 2015
W4	15 February 2015
W5	25 February 2015
W6	3 March 2015
