= List of military equipment of the United States =

This is a list of all military equipment ever used by the United States. This list will deal with all the equipment ever used by all branches of the United States Armed Forces. The list will include lists of all military equipment ever used by a certain branch of the US armed forces as well as all US military equipment in a certain time period like World War II.

== US Army and US Marines Corps ==
- List of military weapons of the United States

== US Navy ==
- List of United States Navy ships

== US Airforce ==
- List of military aircraft of the United States

== US Coast Guard ==
- List of United States Coast Guard cutters

== US Space Force ==
- Equipment of the United States Space Force
