= United States Army =

Land service branch of the U.S. military

- Service Mark of the United States Army Wordmark
- Founded: 3 June 1784 (242 years, 5 months) (in current form) 14 June 1775 (251 years, 5 months) (as the Continental Army)
- Country: United States
- Type: Army
- Role: Land warfare
- Size: 452,823 active duty personnel; 328,084 Army National Guard personnel; 170,601 Army Reserve personnel; 946,961 total uniformed personnel (official data As of 30 June 2025); 223,382 civilian personnel; 4,406 crewed aircraft
- Part of: United States Department of Defense
- Headquarters: The Pentagon; Arlington County, Virginia, U.S.
- Motto: "This We'll Defend"
- Colors: Black, gold and white
- March: "The Army Goes Rolling Along"
- Mascot: Army Mules
- Anniversaries: Army Birthday: 14 June
- Equipment: List of U.S. Army equipment
- Engagements: See list: Revolutionary War War of 1812 Mexican–American War Civil War Indian Wars Spanish–American War China Relief Expedition Philippine–American War Mexican Expedition World War I Russian Civil War Bonus Army suppression World War II Korean War 1958 Lebanon crisis Vietnam War Dominican Civil War Korean DMZ Conflict Invasion of Grenada ; Invasion of Panama Somali Civil War Persian Gulf War Kosovo War Global war on terrorism War in Afghanistan Iraq War Operation Inherent Resolve Battle of Khasham 2026 Iran war
- Website: army.mil

Commanders
- Commander-in-Chief: President Donald Trump
- Secretary of Defense: Pete Hegseth
- Secretary of the Army: Adam Telle (acting)
- Chief of Staff: GEN Christopher LaNeve (acting)
- Vice Chief of Staff: GEN Christopher LaNeve
- Chief Warrant Officer of the Army: CW5 Aaron H. Anderson
- Sergeant Major of the Army: SMA Michael Weimer

Insignia
- Flag

- Field flag (Note: Adopted in 1962.)

- Logo

The United States Army (U.S. Army) is the land service branch of the United States Armed Forces. It is designated as the army of the United States in the United States Constitution. As a part of the United States Department of Defense, it is one of the six armed forces of the United States and one of the eight uniformed services of the United States. Founded in 1784, it succeeded the Continental Army, formed in 1775 during the American Revolutionary War.

The U.S. Army is part of the Department of the Army, which is one of the three military departments of the Department of Defense. The Army is headed by the civilian secretary of the Army, and by the military chief of staff of the Army, a member of the Joint Chiefs of Staff. It is the largest military branch, and for FY2022, the projected headcount of the Army was 1,005,725 soldiers: the Regular Army 480,893 soldiers; the Army National Guard 336,129 soldiers, and the U.S. Army Reserve 188,703 soldiers. Major branches include Air Defense Artillery, Armor, Aviation, Field Artillery, Infantry, and Special Forces. With the world's highest vehicle-to-soldier ratio, the Army operates tens of thousands of combat vehicles, including the M1 Abrams main battle tank, Bradley armored fighting vehicle, and UH-60 Black Hawk helicopters. The Army also deploys key systems for the Missile Defense Agency: the Ground-Based Midcourse Defense, Terminal High Altitude Area Defense, and MIM-104 Patriot.

The U.S. Army fought the American Indian Wars (1784–1890), the War of 1812 (1812–15), Mexican–American War (1846–48). The American Civil War (1861–65) was its costliest conflict, with over 350,000 casualties. It fought the Spanish–American War (1898), World War I (1917–18), World War II (1941–45). In the Cold War, the Army fought the Korean War (1950–53) and Vietnam War (1965–71), and operated tactical nuclear weapons ranging from the Pershing II ballistic missile to the Davy Crockett rifle. Following the Cold War's end in 1991, Army has focused primarily on Western Asia and counterinsurgency roles, including the Gulf War, war in Afghanistan, and war in Iraq. The U.S. Army currently conducts missiles strikes and defense in the 2026 Iran war, and provides materials and training to Ukraine in the Russo-Ukrainian war.

== Mission ==
The United States Army serves as the primary land-based branch of the United States Department of Defense. Section 7062 of Title 10, U.S. Code defines the purpose of the army as:

- Preserving the peace and security and providing for the defense of the United States, the Commonwealths and possessions, and any areas occupied by the United States
- Supporting the national policies
- Implementing the national objectives
- Overcoming any nations responsible for aggressive acts that imperil the peace and security of the United States

In 2018, the Army Strategy 2018 articulated an eight-point addendum to the Army Vision for 2028. While the Army Mission remains constant, the Army Strategy builds upon the Army's Brigade Modernization by adding focus to corps and division-level echelons. The Army Futures Command oversees reforms geared toward conventional warfare. The Army's current reorganization plan is due to be completed by 2028.

The Army's five core competencies are prompt and sustained land combat, combined arms operations (to include combined arms maneuver and wide–area security, armored and mechanized operations and airborne and air assault operations), special operations forces, to set and sustain the theater for the joint force and to integrate national, multinational, and joint power on land.

== History ==
=== Origins ===
The Continental Army was created on 14 June 1775 by the Second Continental Congress as a unified army for the colonies to fight Great Britain, with George Washington appointed as its commander. The army was initially led by men who had served in the British Army or colonial militias and who brought much of British military heritage with them. As the Revolutionary War progressed, French aid, resources, and military thinking helped shape the new army. A number of European soldiers came on their own to help, such as Friedrich Wilhelm von Steuben, who taught Prussian Army tactics and organizational skills.

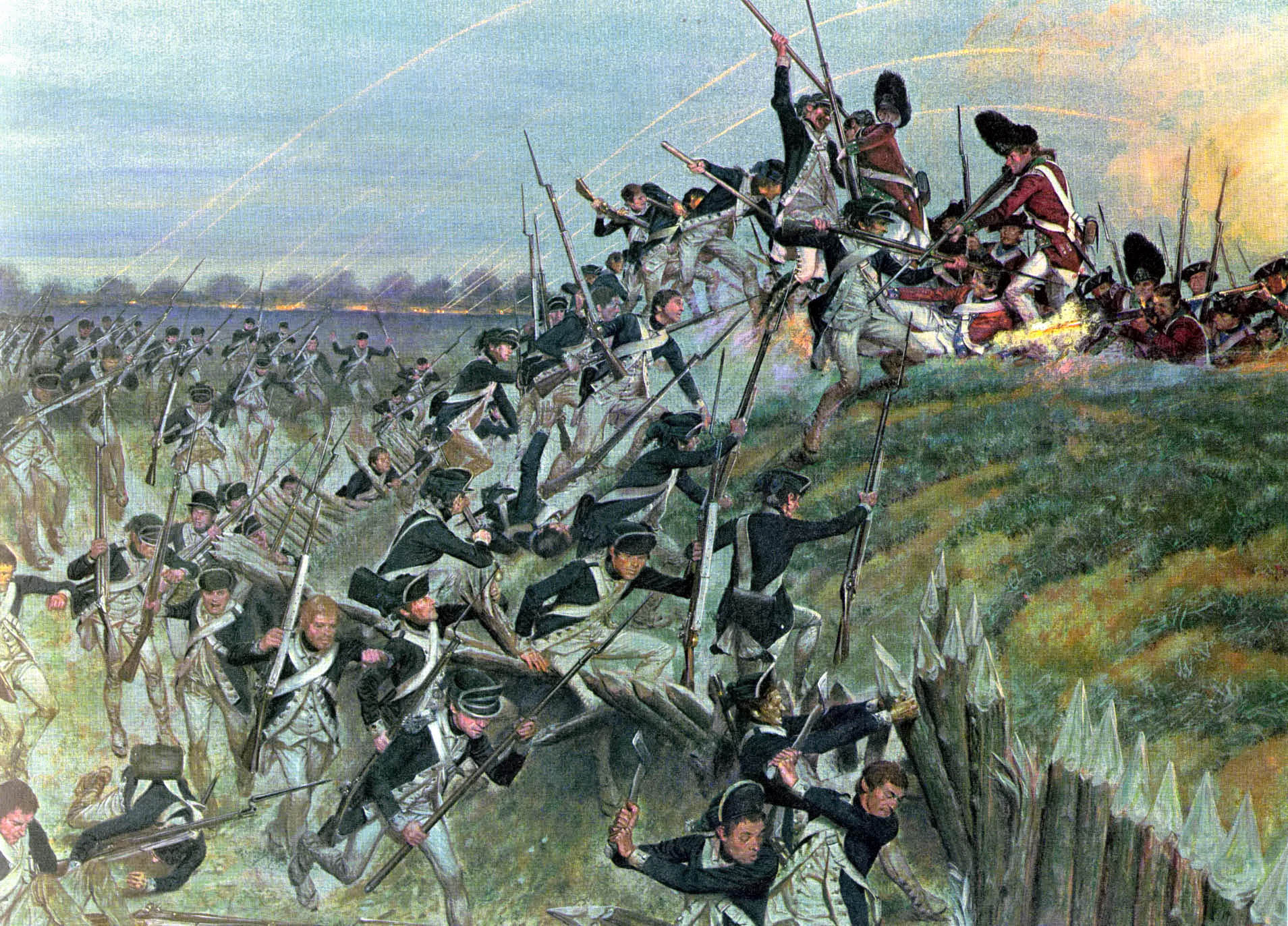
The storming of Redoubt No. 10 in the Siege of Yorktown during the American Revolutionary War, as depicted in a watercolor painting by H. Charles McBarron Jr. (1902–1992) prompted Great Britain's government to begin negotiations, resulting in the Treaty of Paris and Great Britain's recognition of the United States as an independent state.

The Army fought numerous pitched battles, and sometimes used Fabian strategy and hit-and-run tactics in the South in 1780 and 1781; under Major General Nathanael Greene, it hit where the British were weakest to wear down their forces. Washington led victories against the British at Trenton and Princeton, but lost a series of battles in the New York and New Jersey campaign in 1776 and the Philadelphia campaign in 1777. With a decisive victory at Yorktown and the help of the French, the Continental Army prevailed against the British.

After the war, the Continental Army was quickly given land certificates and disbanded in a reflection of the republican distrust of standing armies. State militias became the new nation's sole ground army, except a regiment to guard the Western Frontier and one battery of artillery guarding West Point's arsenal. However, because of continuing conflict with Native Americans, it was soon considered necessary to field a trained standing army. The Regular Army was at first very small and after General St. Clair's defeat at the Battle of the Wabash, where more than 800 soldiers were killed, the Regular Army was reorganized as the Legion of the United States, established in 1791 and renamed the United States Army in 1796.

In 1798, during the Quasi-War with France, the U.S. Congress established a three-year "Provisional Army" of 10,000 men, consisting of twelve regiments of infantry and six troops of light dragoons. In March 1799, Congress created an "Eventual Army" of 30,000 men, including three regiments of cavalry. Both "armies" existed only on paper, but equipment for 3,000 men and horses was procured and stored.

=== 19th century ===
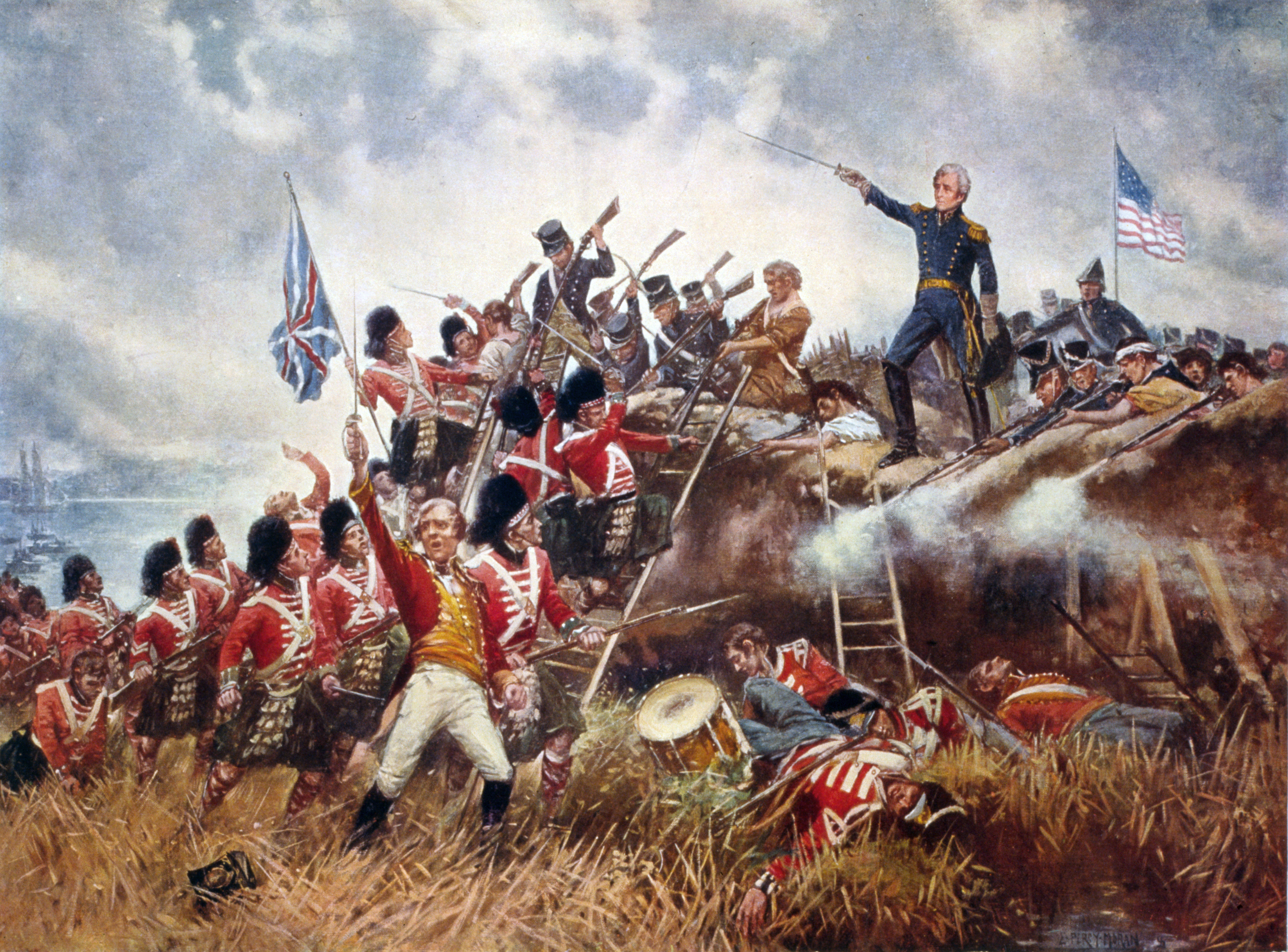
General Andrew Jackson standing on the parapet of his makeshift defenses as his troops repulse attacking Highlanders during the defense of New Orleans, the final major and most one-sided battle of the War of 1812, mainly fought by militia and volunteers.

==== War of 1812 ====
The War of 1812 was the second and last war between the United States and Great Britain. The war was split between a Northern, Southern, and naval campaign. While a large part of the war was fought between the United States and Great Britain, there were a variety of native tribes that fought on both sides of the conflict. The result of the war is the Treaty of Ghent and is generally considered to be inconclusive, and brought upon a period of peace between the United States and Great Britain that has lasted for over two centuries.

==== Seminole Wars ====
There was a long period of war between the United States and the Seminoles that lasted over 50 years. The usual strategies utilized against Native American tribes were to seize winter food supplies and to form alliances with enemies of a tribe. These were not viable options against the Seminoles, largely due to the fact of lack of climate variability in Florida and because of the long history of warring between the Seminole tribe and other tribes in the Florida region.

==== Mexican–American War ====
The U.S. Army fought and won the Mexican–American War, which was a defining event for both countries. The U.S. victory resulted in the Treaty of Guadalupe Hidalgo, in which Mexico ceded a large portion of land to the United States which included the modern-day states of California, Nevada, New Mexico, Arizona, Texas, and parts of Colorado and Wyoming.

==== American Civil War ====
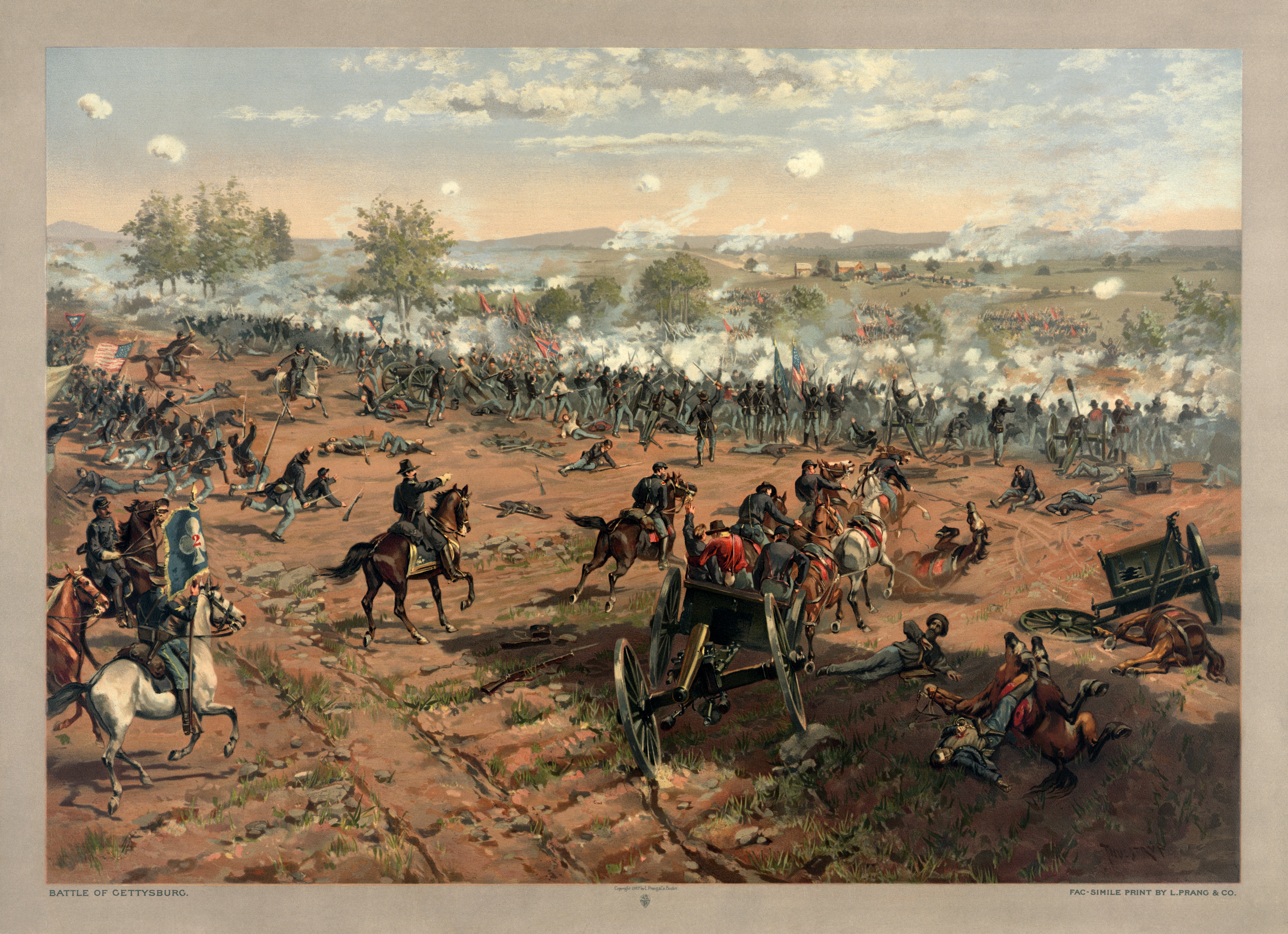
The Battle of Gettysburg, the turning point of the American Civil War

The American Civil War was the costliest war for the U.S. in terms of casualties. After most slave states, located in the southern U.S., formed the Confederate States, the Confederate States Army, led by former U.S. Army officers, mobilized a large fraction of Southern white manpower. Forces of the United States (the "Union" or "the North") formed the Union Army, consisting of a small body of regular army units and a large body of volunteer units raised from every state, north and south, except South Carolina.

For the first two years, Confederate forces did well in set battles but lost control of the border states. The Confederates had the advantage of defending a large territory in an area where disease caused twice as many deaths as combat. The Union pursued a strategy of seizing the coastline, blockading the ports, and taking control of the river systems. By 1863, the Confederacy was being strangled. Its eastern armies fought well, but the western armies were defeated one after another until the Union forces captured New Orleans in 1862 along with the Tennessee River. In the Vicksburg Campaign of 1862–1863, General Ulysses Grant seized the Mississippi River and cut off the Southwest. Grant took command of Union forces in 1864 and after a series of battles with very heavy casualties, he had General Robert E. Lee under siege in Richmond as General William T. Sherman captured Atlanta and marched through Georgia and the Carolinas. The Confederate capital was abandoned in April 1865 and Lee subsequently surrendered his army at Appomattox Court House. All other Confederate armies surrendered within a few months.

The war remains the deadliest conflict in U.S. history, resulting in the deaths of 620,000 men on both sides. Based on 1860 census figures, 8% of all white males aged 13 to 43 died in the war, including 6.4% in the North and 18% in the South.

==== Later 19th century ====
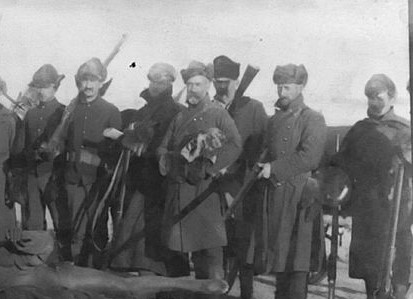
Army soldiers in 1890

Following the Civil War, the U.S. Army had the mission of containing western tribes of Native Americans on the Indian reservations. They set up many forts, and engaged in the last of the American Indian Wars. U.S. Army troops also occupied several Southern states during the Reconstruction Era to protect freedmen.

The key battles of the Spanish–American War of 1898 were fought by the Navy. Using mostly new volunteers, the U.S. forces defeated Spain in land campaigns in Cuba and played the central role in the Philippine–American War.

=== 20th century ===
Starting in 1910, the army began acquiring fixed-wing aircraft. In 1910, during the Mexican Revolution, the army was deployed to U.S. towns near the border to ensure the safety of lives and property. In 1916, Pancho Villa, a major rebel leader, attacked Columbus, New Mexico, prompting a U.S. intervention in Mexico until 7 February 1917. They fought the rebels and the Mexican federal troops until 1918.

==== World Wars ====
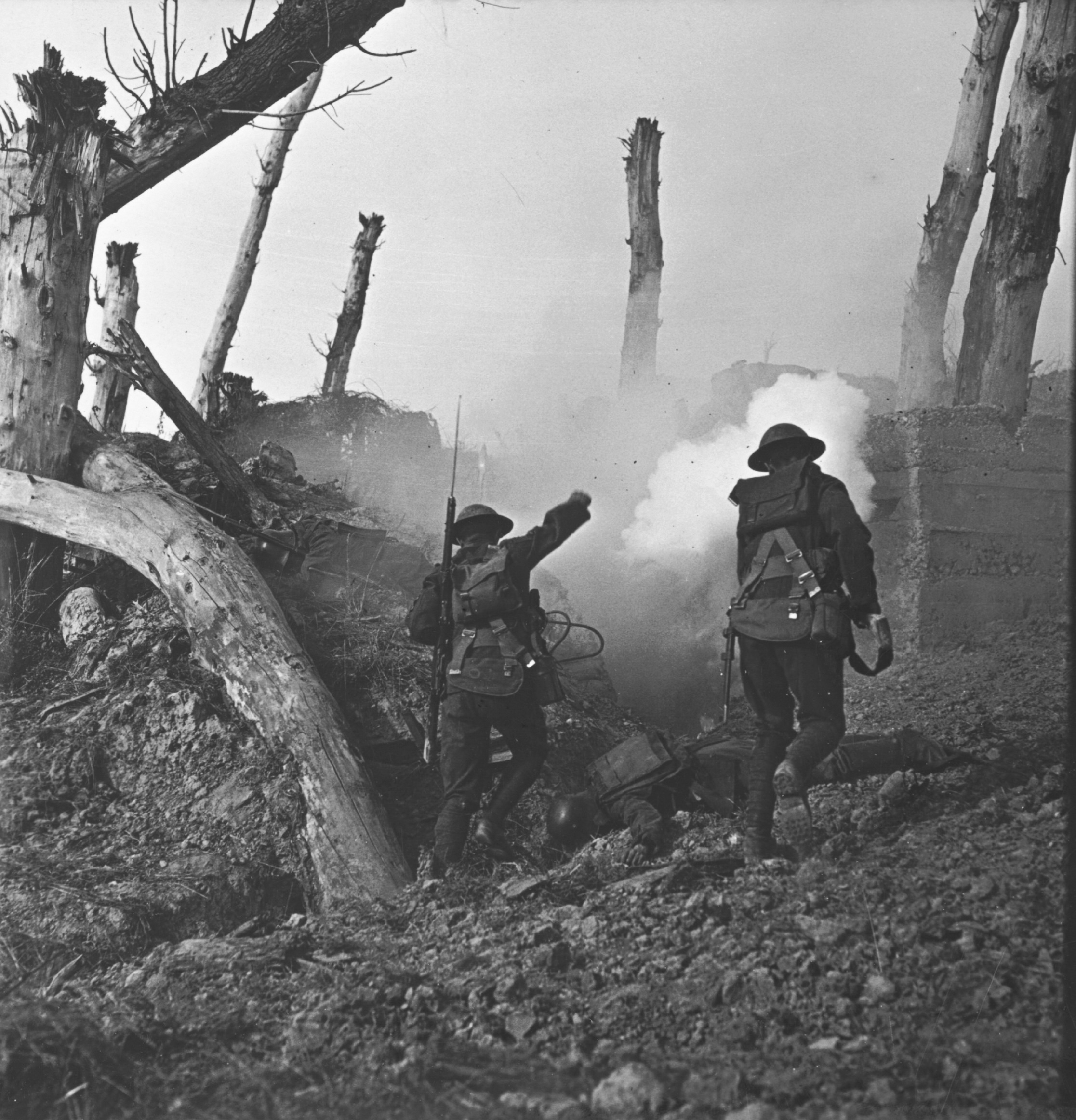
U.S. Army troops assaulting a German bunker in France, c. 1918

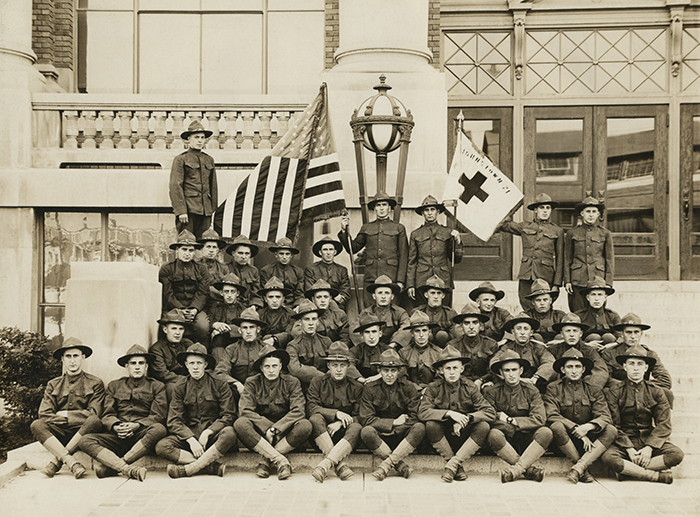
U.S. Army unit before heading to France during World War I

The United States joined World War I as an "Associated Power" in 1917 on the side of Britain, France, Russia, Italy and the other Allies. U.S. troops were sent to the Western Front and were involved in the last offensives that ended the war. With the armistice in November 1918, the army once again decreased its forces.

In 1939, estimates of the Army's strength ranged between 174,000 and 200,000 soldiers, smaller than that of Portugal's, which ranked it 17th or 19th in the world in size. General George C. Marshall became Army chief of staff in September 1939 and set about expanding and modernizing the Army in preparation for war.

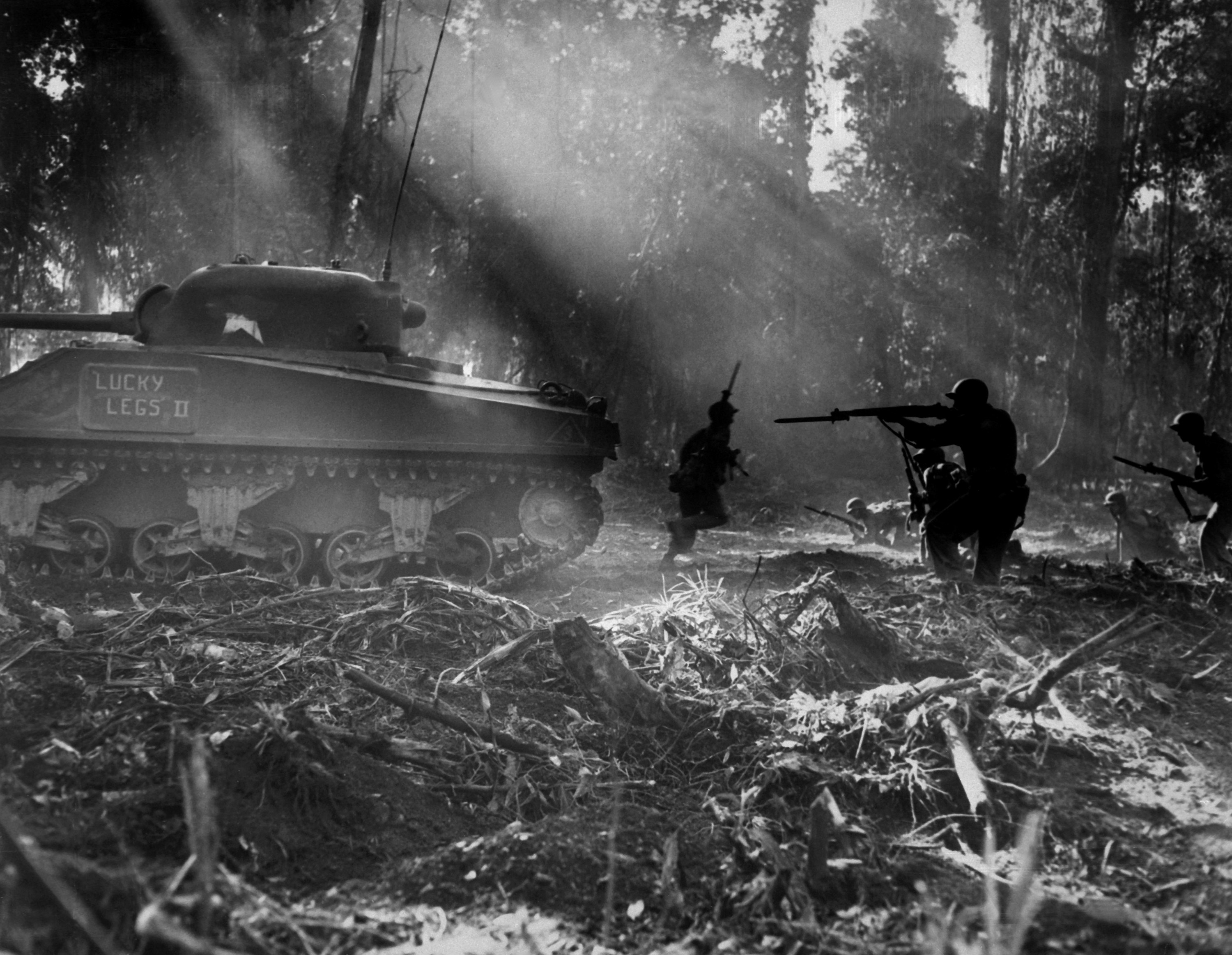
U.S. soldiers hunting for Japanese infiltrators during the Bougainville Campaign

The United States joined World War II in December 1941 after the Japanese attack on Pearl Harbor. Some 11 million Americans were to serve in various Army operations. On the European front, U.S. Army troops formed a significant portion of the forces that landed in French North Africa and took Tunisia and then moved on to Sicily and later fought in Italy. In the June 1944 landings in northern France and in the subsequent liberation of Europe and defeat of Nazi Germany, millions of U.S. Army troops played a central role. In 1947, the number of soldiers in the US Army had decreased from eight million in 1945 to 684,000 soldiers and the total number of active divisions had dropped from 89 to 12. The leaders of the Army saw this demobilization as a success.

In the Pacific War, U.S. Army Soldiers made up the vast majority of ground forces there, capturing the Pacific Islands from Japanese control. In total, there were 86 amphibious landings throughout the Pacific. The Army conducted 71. Following the Axis surrenders in May (Germany) and August (Japan) of 1945, Army troops were deployed to Japan and Germany to occupy the two defeated nations. Two years after World War II, the Army Air Forces separated from the Army to become the United States Air Force in September 1947. In 1948, the Army was desegregated by Executive Order 9981 of President Harry S. Truman.

==== Cold War ====
===== 1945–1960 =====
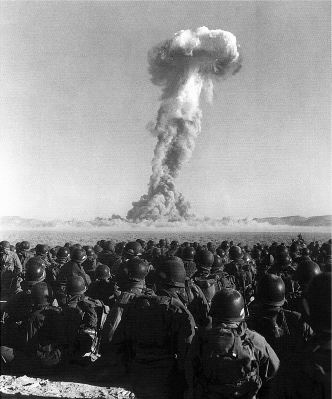
U.S. Army soldiers observing an atomic bomb test of Operation Buster-Jangle at the Nevada Test Site during the Korean War

The end of World War II set the stage for the East–West confrontation known as the Cold War. With the outbreak of the Korean War, concerns over the defense of Western Europe rose. Two corps, V and VII, were reactivated under Seventh United States Army in 1950 and U.S. strength in Europe rose from one division to four. Hundreds of thousands of U.S. troops remained stationed in West Germany, with others in Belgium, the Netherlands and the United Kingdom, until the 1990s in anticipation of a possible Soviet attack.

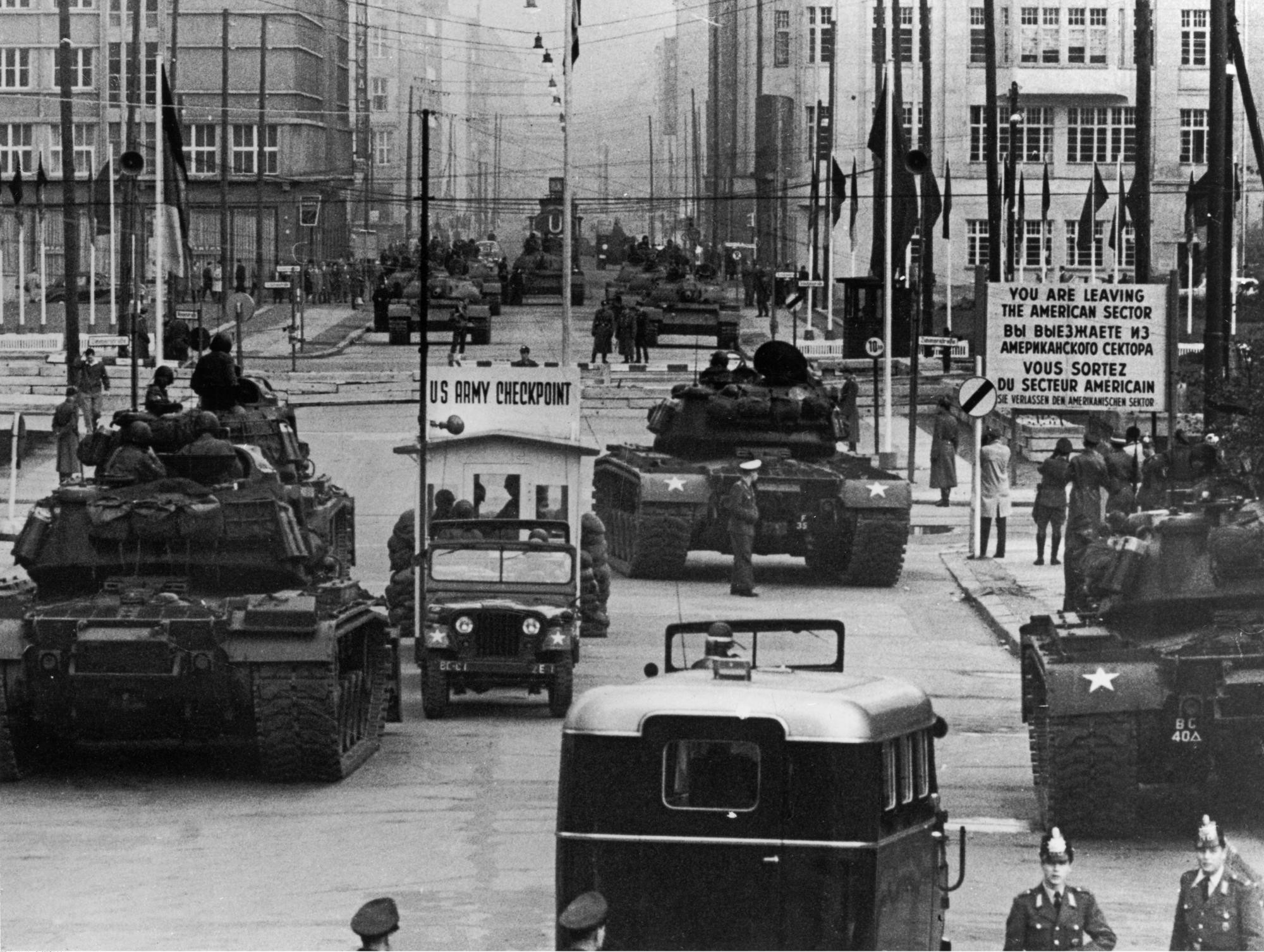
US tanks and Soviet tanks at Checkpoint Charlie, 1961

During the Cold War, U.S. troops and their allies fought communist forces in Korea and Vietnam. The Korean War began in June 1950, when the Soviets walked out of a UN Security Council meeting, removing their possible veto. Under a United Nations umbrella, hundreds of thousands of U.S. troops fought to prevent the takeover of South Korea by North Korea and later to invade the northern nation. After repeated advances and retreats by both sides and the Chinese People's Volunteer Army's entry into the war, the Korean Armistice Agreement returned the peninsula to the status quo in July 1953.

===== 1960–1970 =====
The Vietnam War is often regarded as a low point for the U.S. Army due to the use of drafted personnel, the unpopularity of the war with the U.S. public and frustrating restrictions placed on the military by U.S. political leaders. While U.S. forces had been stationed in South Vietnam since 1959, in intelligence and advising/training roles, they were not deployed in large numbers until 1965, after the Gulf of Tonkin Incident. U.S. forces effectively established and maintained control of the "traditional" battlefield, but they struggled to counter the guerrilla hit and run tactics of the communist Viet Cong and the People's Army of Vietnam (NVA).

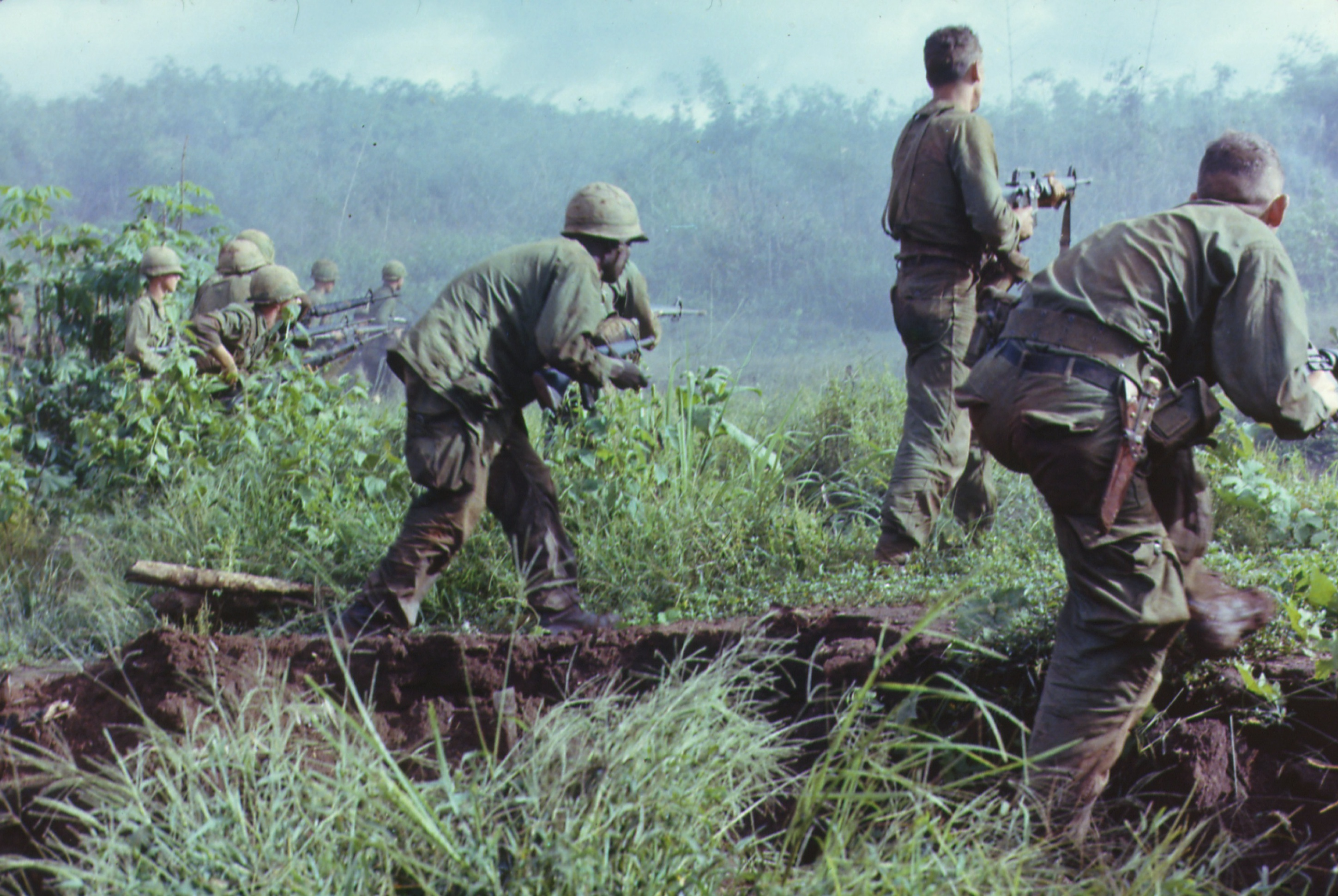
A U.S. Army infantry patrol moving up to assault the last North Vietnamese Army position at Dak To, South Vietnam during Operation Hawthorne

During the 1960s, the Department of Defense continued to scrutinize the reserve forces and to question the number of divisions and brigades as well as the redundancy of maintaining two reserve components, the Army National Guard and the Army Reserve. In 1967, Secretary of Defense Robert McNamara decided that 15 combat divisions in the Army National Guard were unnecessary and cut the number to eight divisions (one mechanized infantry, two armored, and five infantry), but increased the number of brigades from seven to 18 (one airborne, one armored, two mechanized infantry and 14 infantry). The loss of the divisions did not sit well with the states. Their objections included the inadequate maneuver element mix for those that remained and the end to the practice of rotating divisional commands among the states that supported them. Under the proposal, the remaining division commanders were to reside in the state of the division base. However, no reduction in total Army National Guard strength was to take place, which convinced the governors to accept the plan. The states reorganized their forces accordingly between 1 December 1967 and 1 May 1968.

===== 1970–1990 =====
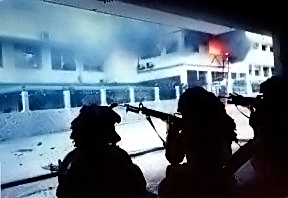
U.S. Army soldiers preparing to take La Comandancia in the El Chorrillo neighborhood of Panama City during Operation Just Cause

The Total Force Policy was adopted by Chief of Staff of the Army General Creighton Abrams in the aftermath of the Vietnam War and involved treating the three components of the army – the Regular Army, the Army National Guard and the Army Reserve as a single force. General Abrams' intertwining of the three components of the army effectively made extended operations impossible without the involvement of both the Army National Guard and Army Reserve in a predominantly combat support role. The army converted to an all-volunteer force with greater emphasis on training to specific performance standards driven by the reforms of General William E. DePuy, the first commander of United States Army Training and Doctrine Command. Following the Camp David Accords that was signed by Egypt, Israel that was brokered by president Jimmy Carter in 1978, as part of the agreement, both the United States and Egypt agreed that there would be a joint military training led by both countries that would usually take place every 2 years, that exercise is known as Exercise Bright Star.

The 1980s was mostly a decade of reorganization. The Goldwater–Nichols Act of 1986 created unified combatant commands bringing the army together with the other four military services under unified, geographically organized command structures. The army also played a role in the invasions of Grenada in 1983 (Operation Urgent Fury) and Panama in 1989 (Operation Just Cause).

By 1989, Germany was nearing reunification and the Cold War was coming to a close. Army leadership reacted by starting to plan for a reduction in strength. By November 1989 Pentagon briefers were laying out plans to reduce army end strength by 23%, from 750,000 to 580,000. A number of incentives such as early retirement were used.

==== 1990s ====
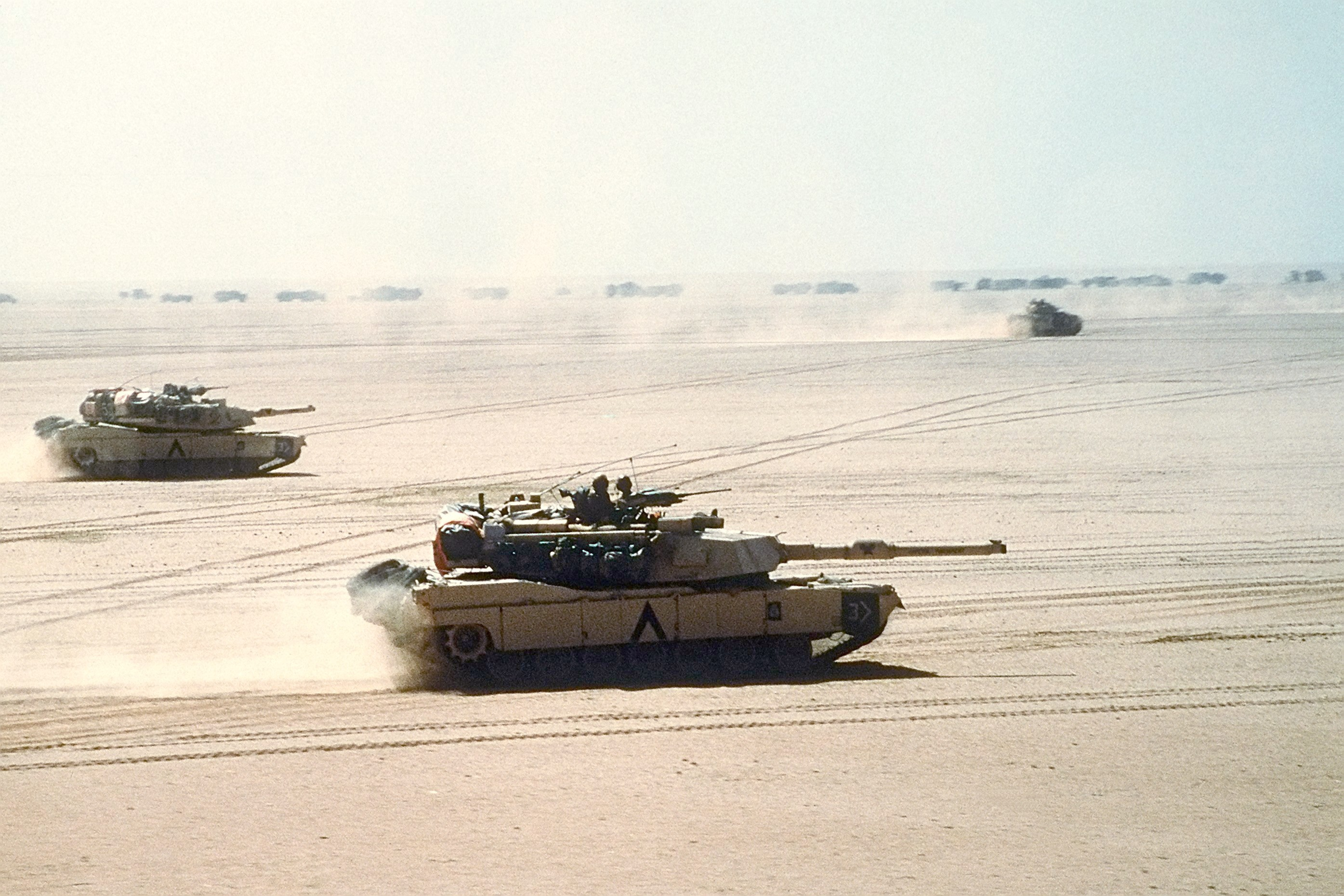
M1 Abrams tanks moving out before the Battle of Al Busayyah during the Gulf War

In 1990, Iraq invaded its smaller neighbor, Kuwait, and U.S. land forces quickly deployed to assure the protection of Saudi Arabia. In January 1991 Operation Desert Storm commenced, a U.S.-led coalition which deployed over 500,000 troops, the bulk of them from U.S. Army formations, to drive out Iraqi forces. The campaign ended in total victory, as Western coalition forces routed the Iraqi Army. Some of the largest tank battles in history were fought during the Gulf war. The Battle of Medina Ridge, Battle of Norfolk and the Battle of 73 Easting were tank battles of historical significance.

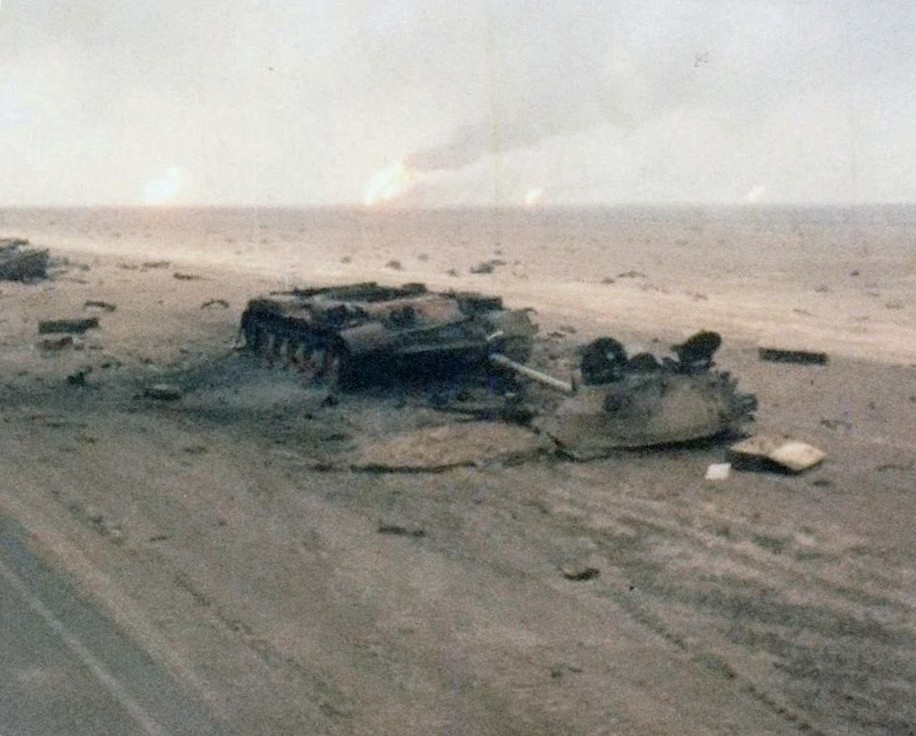
Iraqi tanks destroyed by Task Force 1-41 Infantry during the Gulf War, February 1991

After Operation Desert Storm, the army did not see major combat operations for the remainder of the 1990s but did participate in a number of peacekeeping activities. In 1990 the Department of Defense issued guidance for "rebalancing" after a review of the Total Force Policy, but in 2004, USAF Air War College scholars concluded the guidance would reverse the Total Force Policy which is an "essential ingredient to the successful application of military force".

=== 21st century ===
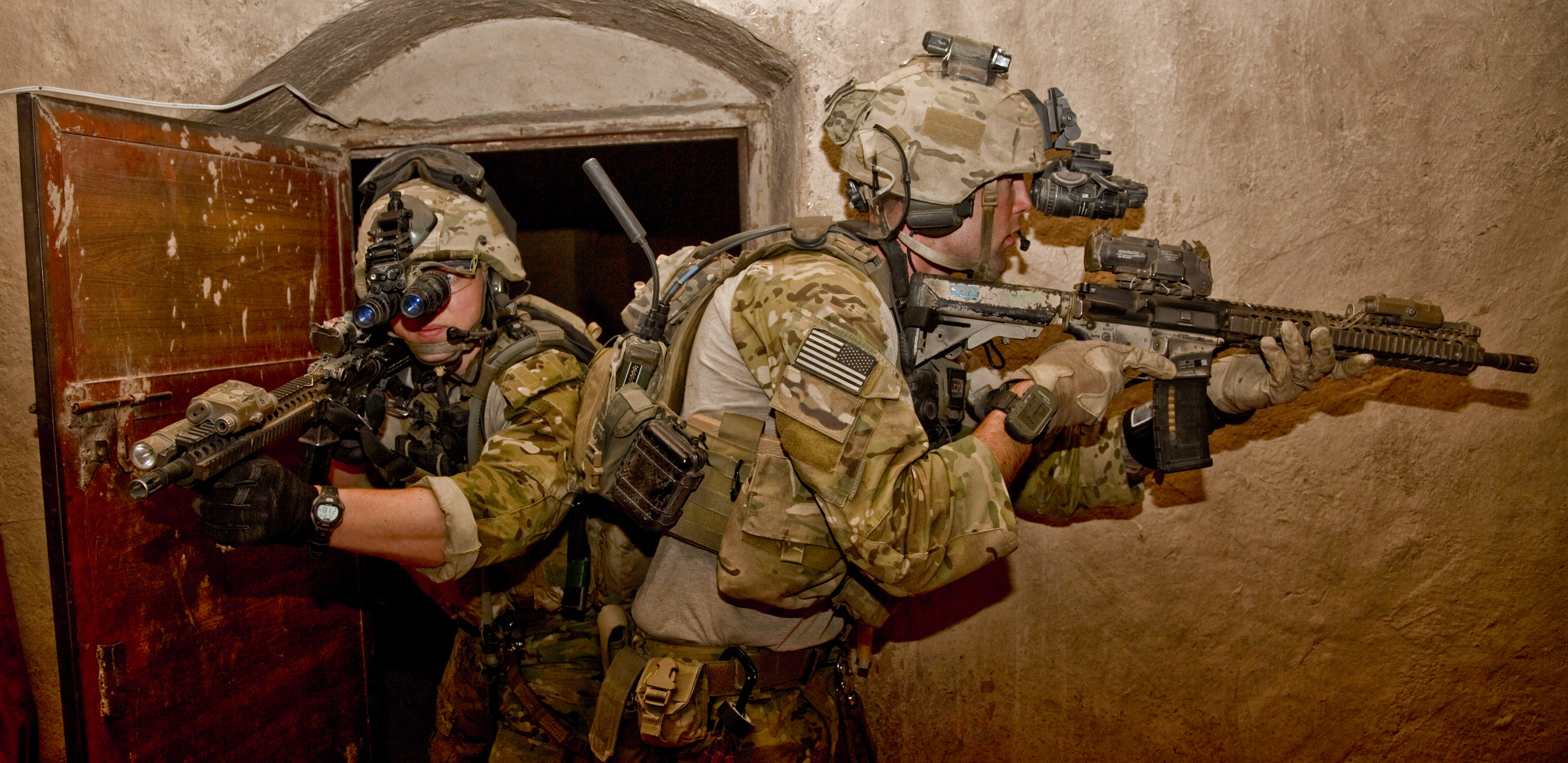
U.S. Army Rangers taking part in a raid during an operation in Nahr-e Saraj, Afghanistan

On 11 September 2001, 53 Army civilians (47 employees and six contractors) and 22 soldiers were among the 125 victims killed in the Pentagon in a terrorist attack when American Airlines Flight 77 commandeered by five Al-Qaeda hijackers slammed into the western side of the building, as part of the September 11 attacks. In response to the 11 September attacks and as part of the global war on terror, U.S. and NATO forces invaded Afghanistan in October 2001, displacing the Taliban government. The U.S. Army was the first into Afghanistan, with the 10th Mountain Division being the first conventional unit to arrive in country in 2001. The U.S. Army also led the combined U.S. and allied invasion of Iraq in 2003; it served as the primary source for ground forces with its ability to sustain short and long-term deployment operations. Like Afghanistan, the U.S. Army was the first into Iraq. In the following years, the mission changed from conflict between regular militaries to counterinsurgency, resulting in the deaths of more than 4,000 U.S. service members (as of March 2008) and injuries to thousands more. 23,813 insurgents were killed in Iraq between 2003 and 2011.

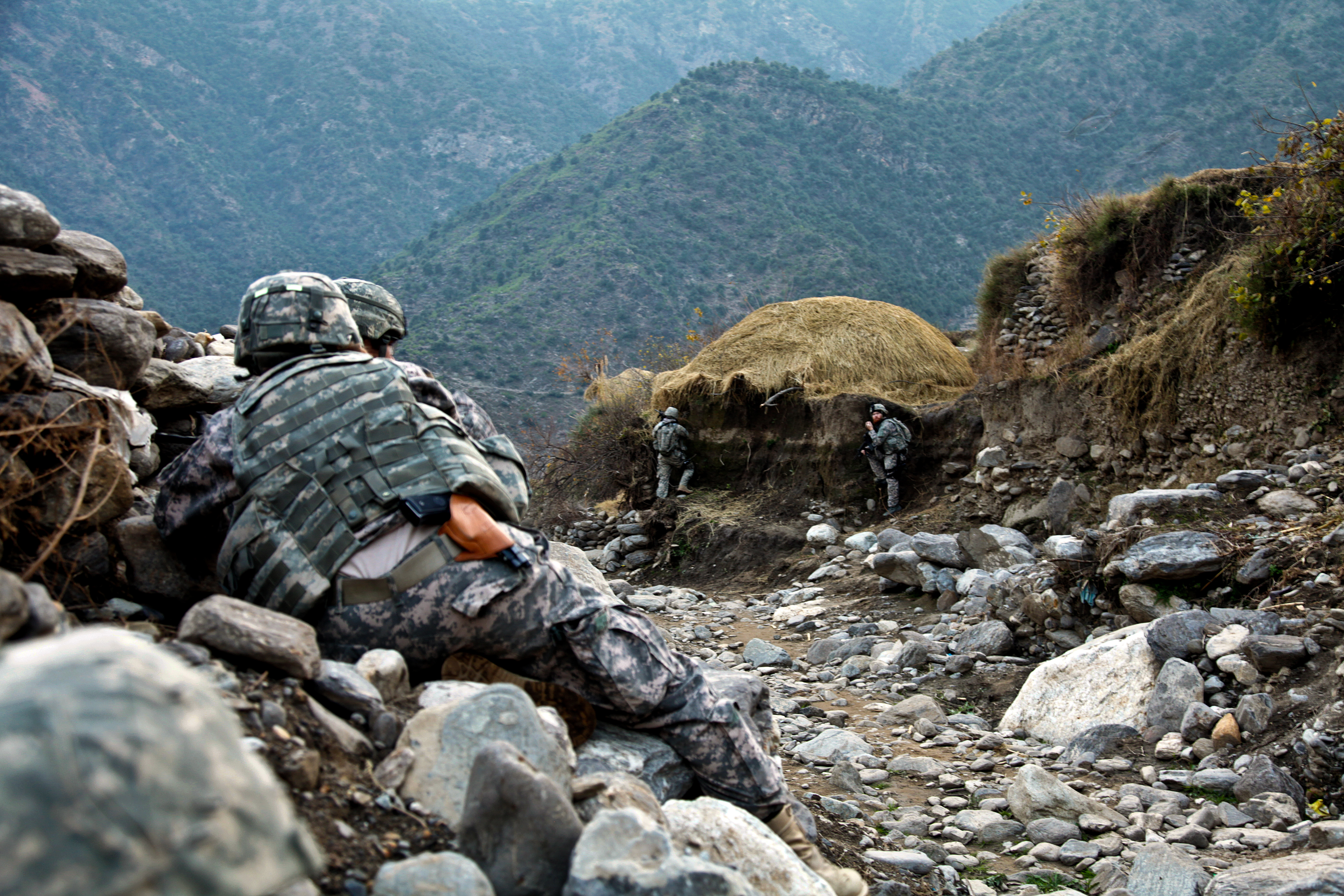
U.S. Army Soldiers with the 10th Mountain Division take cover during an ambush by enemy forces in Kunar Province, Afghanistan, 2009

Until 2009, the Army's chief modernization plan, its most ambitious since World War II, was the Future Combat Systems program. In 2009, many systems were canceled, and the remaining were swept into the BCT Modernization program. By 2017, the Brigade Modernization project was completed and its headquarters, the Brigade Modernization Command, was renamed the Joint Modernization Command, or JMC. In response to Budget sequestration in 2013, Army plans were to shrink to 1940 levels, although actual Active-Army end-strengths were projected to fall to some 450,000 troops by the end of FY2017.

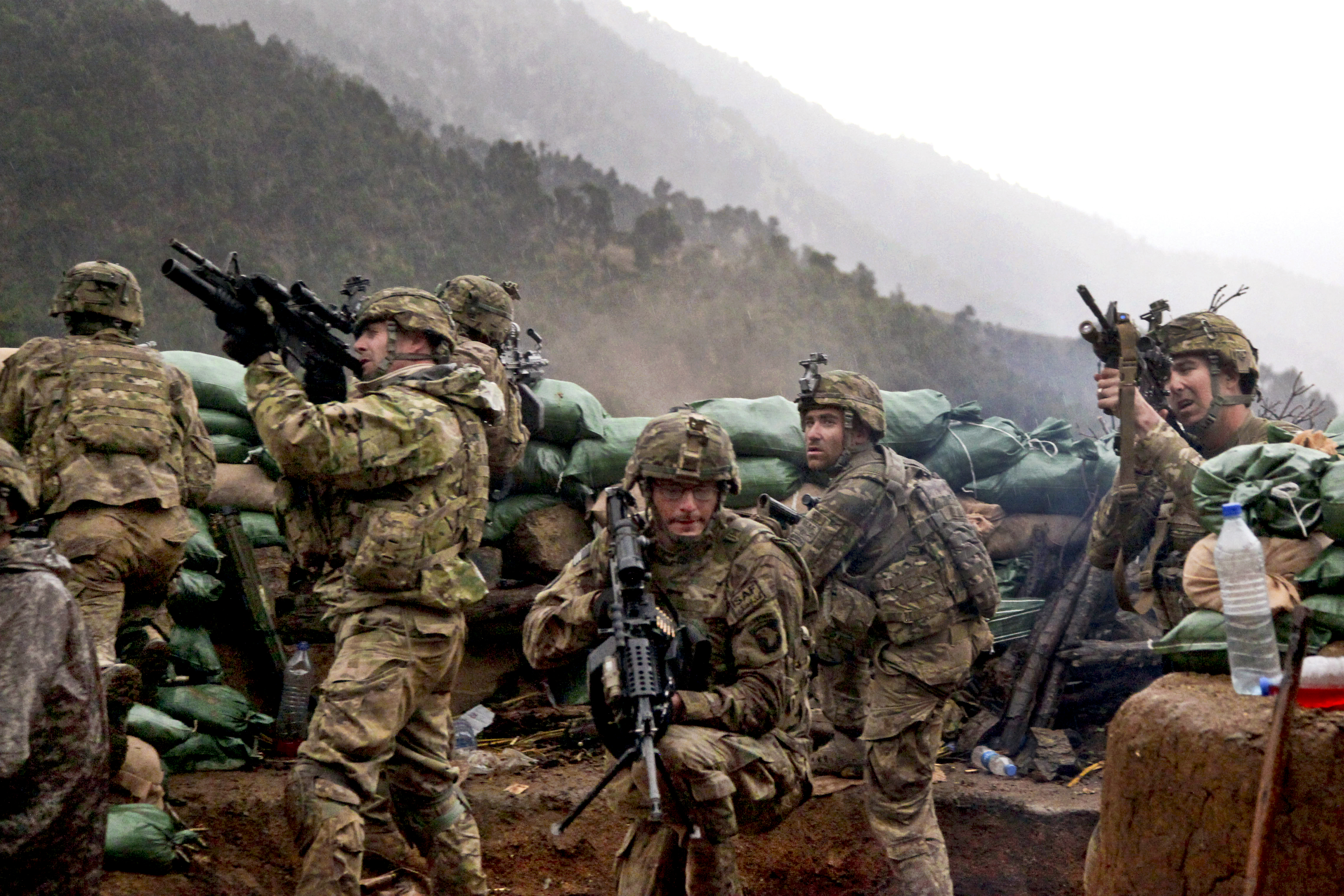
U.S. Army soldiers with the 2nd Battalion, 327th Infantry Regiment, 101st Airborne Division returning fire during a firefight with Taliban forces in Barawala Kalay Valley in Kunar Province, Afghanistan, March 2011

From 2016 to 2017, the Army retired hundreds of OH-58 Kiowa Warrior observation helicopters, while retaining its Apache gunships. The 2015 expenditure for Army research, development and acquisition changed from $32 billion projected in 2012 for FY15 to $21 billion for FY15 expected in 2014.

In the 2026 Iran war, the Army participated via offensive missile launches, air defense operations, and possibly combat search and rescue. Army forces launched both ATACMS and Precision Strike Missile tactical ballistic missile against Iran, marking the latter's first combat use. Air defense operations included response to Iran's strikes on Israel and strikes on Arab countries. The Army was also speculated to assist the 3 to 5 April pilot rescue operation in Iran, via the 160th Special Operations Aviation Regiment (Airborne).

== Organization ==
Organization of the United States Army within the Department of Defense

=== Planning ===
By 2017, a task force was formed to address Army modernization, which triggered shifts of units: CCDC, and ARCIC, from within Army Materiel Command (AMC), and Army Training and Doctrine Command (TRADOC), respectively, to a new Army Command (ACOM) in 2018. AFC's mission is modernization reform: to design hardware, as well as to work within the acquisition process which defines materiel for AMC. TRADOC's mission is to define the architecture and organization of the Army, and to train and supply soldiers to FORSCOM. AFC's cross-functional teams (CFTs) are Futures Command's vehicle for sustainable reform of the acquisition process for the future. In order to support the Army's modernization priorities, its FY2020 budget allocated $30 billion for the top six modernization priorities over the next five years. The $30 billion came from $8 billion in cost avoidance and $22 billion in terminations.

=== Army Components ===
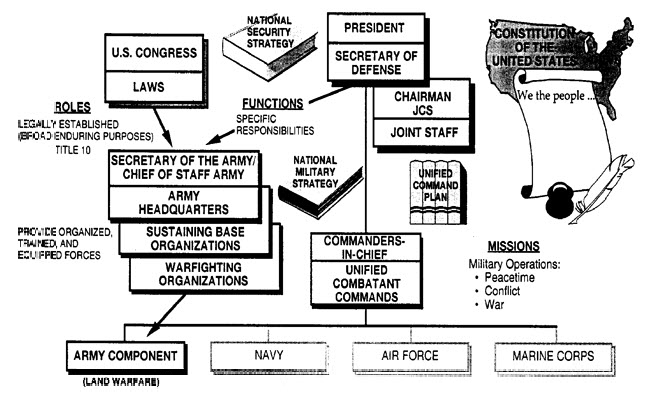
U.S. Army organization chart

The task of organizing the U.S. Army commenced in 1775. In the first one hundred years of its existence, the United States Army was maintained as a small peacetime force to man permanent forts and perform other non-wartime duties such as engineering and construction works. During times of war, the U.S. Army was augmented by the much larger United States Volunteers which were raised independently by various state governments. States also maintained full-time militias which could also be called into the service of the army.

By the twentieth century, the U.S. Army had mobilized the U.S. Volunteers on four occasions during each of the major wars of the nineteenth century. During World War I, the "National Army" was organized to fight the conflict, replacing the concept of U.S. Volunteers. It was demobilized at the end of World War I and was replaced by the Regular Army, the Organized Reserve Corps, and the state militias. In the 1920s and 1930s, the "career" soldiers were known as the "Regular Army" with the "Enlisted Reserve Corps" and "Officer Reserve Corps" augmented to fill vacancies when needed.

In 1941, the "Army of the United States" was founded to fight World War II. The Regular Army, Army of the United States, the National Guard, and Officer/Enlisted Reserve Corps (ORC and ERC) existed simultaneously. After World War II, the ORC and ERC were combined into the United States Army Reserve. The Army of the United States was re-established for the Korean War and Vietnam War and was demobilized upon the suspension of the draft.

Currently, the Army is divided into the Regular Army, the Army Reserve, and the Army National Guard. Some states further maintain state defense forces, as a type of reserve to the National Guard, while all states maintain regulations for state militias.

The U.S. Army is also divided into several branches and functional areas. Branches include officers, warrant officers, and enlisted Soldiers while functional areas consist of officers who are reclassified from their former branch into a functional area. However, officers continue to wear the branch insignia of their former branch in most cases, as functional areas do not generally have discrete insignia. Some branches, such as Special Forces, operate similarly to functional areas in that individuals may not join their ranks until having served in another Army branch. Careers in the Army can extend into cross-functional areas for officers, warrant officers, enlisted, and civilian personnel.

U.S. Army branches and functional areas
Branch	Insignia and colors	Branch	Insignia and colors	Functional Area (FA)
Acquisition Corps (AC)		Air Defense Artillery (AD)		Information Network Engineering (FA 26)
Adjutant General's Corps (AG); Includes Army Bands (AB)		Armor (AR); Includes Cavalry (CV)		Information Operations (FA 30)
Aviation (AV)		Civil Affairs Corps (CA)		Strategic Intelligence (FA 34)
Chaplain Corps (CH)		Chemical Corps (CM)		Academy Professor (FA 47)
Cyber Corps (CY)		Dental Corps (DC)		Foreign Area Officer (FA 48)
Corps of Engineers (EN)		Field Artillery (FA)		Operations Research/Systems Analysis (FA 49)
Finance Corps (FI)		Infantry (IN)		Force Management (FA 50)
Inspector General (IG)		Logistics (LG)		Acquisition (FA 51)
Judge Advocate General's Corps (JA)		Military Intelligence Corps (MI)		Nuclear and Counter WMD Officer (FA 52B)
Medical Corps (MC)		Medical Service Corps (MS)		Simulation Operations (FA 57)
Military Police Corps (MP)		Army Nurse Corps (AN)		Army Marketing (FA 58)
Psychological Operations (PO)		Medical Specialist Corps (SP)		Health Services (FA 70)
Quartermaster Corps (QM)		Staff Specialist Corps (SS) (USAR and ARNG only)		Laboratory Sciences (FA 71)
Special Forces (SF)		Ordnance Corps (OD)		Preventive Medicine Sciences (FA 72)
Veterinary Corps (VC)		Public Affairs (PA)		Behavioral Sciences (FA 73)
Transportation Corps (TC)		Signal Corps (SC)		
Space Operations Branch (SO)				
Special branch insignias (for some unique duty assignments)
National Guard Bureau (NGB)		General Staff		U.S. Military Academy Staff
Chaplain Candidate		Officer Candidate		Warrant Officer Candidate
Aide-de-camp				Senior Enlisted Advisor (SEA)

Before 1933, the Army National Guard members were considered state militia until they were mobilized into the U.S. Army, typically at the onset of war. Since the 1933 amendment to the National Defense Act of 1916, all Army National Guard soldiers have held dual status. They serve as National Guardsmen under the authority of the governor of their state or territory and as reserve members of the U.S. Army under the authority of the president, in the Army National Guard of the United States.

Since the adoption of the total force policy, in the aftermath of the Vietnam War, reserve component soldiers have taken a more active role in U.S. military operations. For example, Reserve and Guard units took part in the Gulf War, peacekeeping in Kosovo, Afghanistan, and the 2003 invasion of Iraq.

=== Army commands and army service component commands ===
Headquarters, United States Department of the Army (HQDA):

Army Commands	Current commander	Location of headquarters (Note: On 5 January 2023 William A. LaPlante, US under-secretary of defense for acquisition and sustainment (USD (A&S)) directed the full implementation of the recommendations of the Naming Commission, DoD-wide.)
United States Army Transformation and Training Command (T2COM)	GEN David M. Hodne	Austin, Texas
United States Army Materiel Command (AMC)	LTG Christopher O. Mohan	Redstone Arsenal, Alabama
Army Service Component Commands	Current commander	Location of headquarters
United States Army Western Hemisphere Command (USAWHC)	GEN Joseph A. Ryan	Fort Bragg, North Carolina
United States Army Europe and Africa(USAREUR-AF)/Seventh Army	GEN Christopher T. Donahue	Clay Kaserne, Wiesbaden, Germany
United States Army Pacific (USARPAC)	GEN Ronald P. Clark	Fort Shafter, Hawaii
United States Army Central (ARCENT)/Third Army	LTG Kevin C. Leahy	Shaw Air Force Base, South Carolina
United States Army Cyber Command (ARCYBER)	LTG Maria B. Barrett	Fort Gordon, Georgia
United States Army Space and Missile Defense Command/United States Army Forces Strategic Command (USASMDC/ARSTRAT)	LTG Sean Gainey	Redstone Arsenal, Alabama
United States Army Special Operations Command (USASOC)	LTG Lawrence G. Ferguson	Fort Bragg, North Carolina
United States Army Transportation Command (ARTRANS)	MG Lance G. Curtis	Scott AFB, Illinois
Operational Force Headquarters	Current commander	Location of headquarters
Eighth Army (EUSA)	LTG Joseph E. Hilbert	Camp Humphreys, South Korea
Direct reporting units	Current commander	Location of headquarters
Arlington National Cemetery and Soldiers' and Airmen's Home National Cemetery	Katharine Kelley (civilian)	Arlington County, Virginia
Joint Counter-Small Unmanned Aircraft Systems Office	MG David F. Stewart	Arlington County, Virginia
Military Postal Service Agency	BG Gregory S. Johnson	Arlington County, Virginia
United States Army Acquisition Support Center (USAASC)	Ronald (Rob) Richardson (civilian)	Fort Belvoir, Virginia
United States Army Audit Agency (USAAA)	Bruce B. Miller	Alexandria, Virginia
United States Army Civilian Human Resources Agency (CHRA)	Carol Burton (civilian)	Aberdeen Proving Ground, Maryland
United States Army Corps of Engineers (USACE)	LTG William H. Graham Jr.	Washington, D.C.
United States Army Corrections Command (ACC)	BG Sarah K. Albrycht	Arlington County, Virginia
United States Army Criminal Investigation Division (USACID)	Gregory D. Ford	Quantico, Virginia
United States Army Human Resources Command (HRC)	MG Hope C. Rampy	Fort Knox, Kentucky
United States Army Intelligence and Security Command (INSCOM)	MG Timothy D. Brown	Fort Belvoir, Virginia
United States Army Medical Command (MEDCOM)	LTG Mary K. Izaguirre	Joint Base San Antonio, Texas
U.S. Army Reserve Command (USARC)	LTG Robert Harter	Fort Bragg, North Carolina
United States Army Military District of Washington (MDW)	MG Antoinette R. Gant	Fort Lesley J. McNair, Washington, D.C.
United States Military Academy (USMA)	LTG Steven W. Gilland	West Point, New York
Source: U.S. Army organization

=== Structure ===
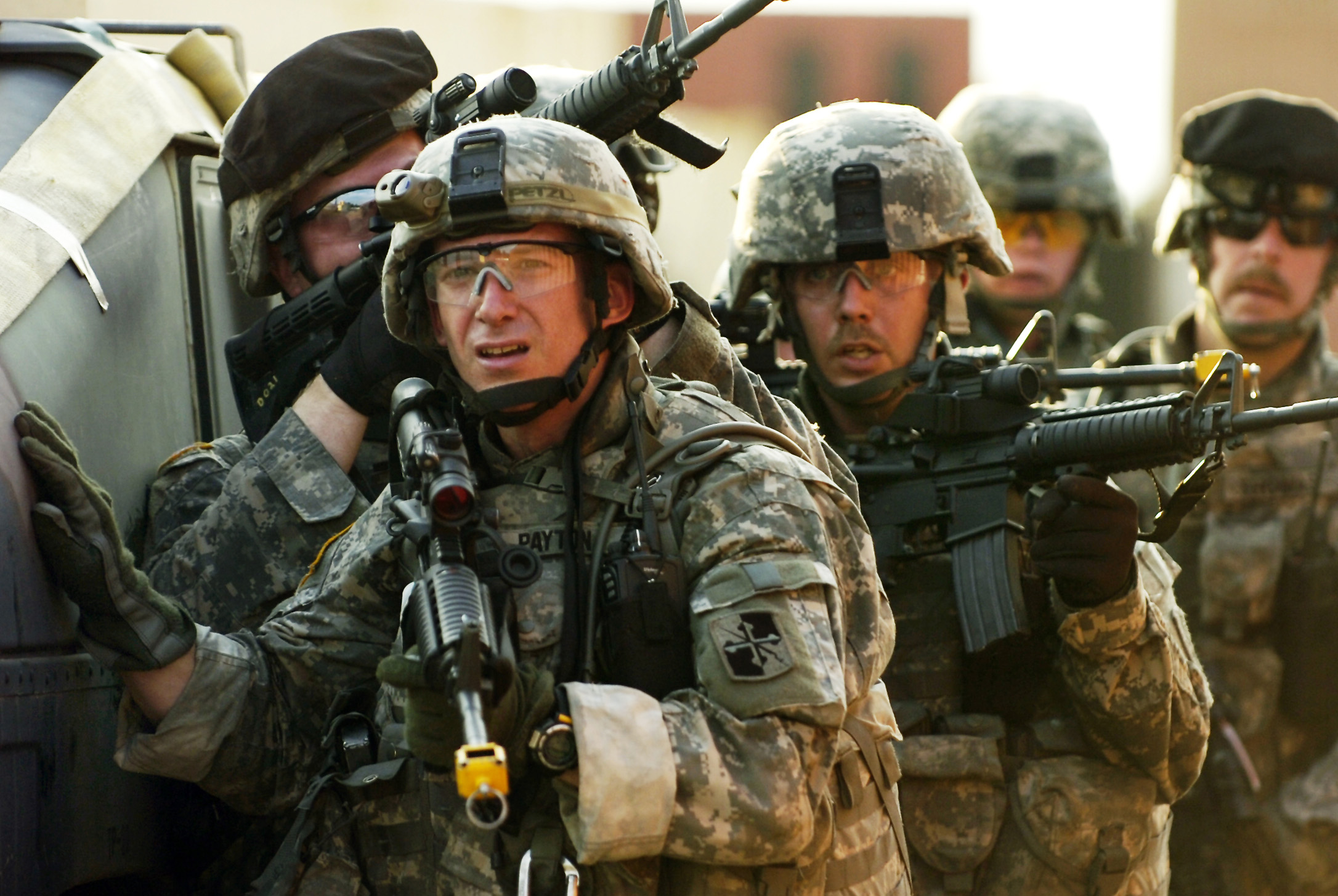
U.S. Army soldiers of the 1st Battalion, 175th Infantry Regiment, Maryland Army National Guard conducting an urban cordon and search exercise as part of the army readiness and training evaluation program in the mock city of Balad at Fort Dix, New Jersey

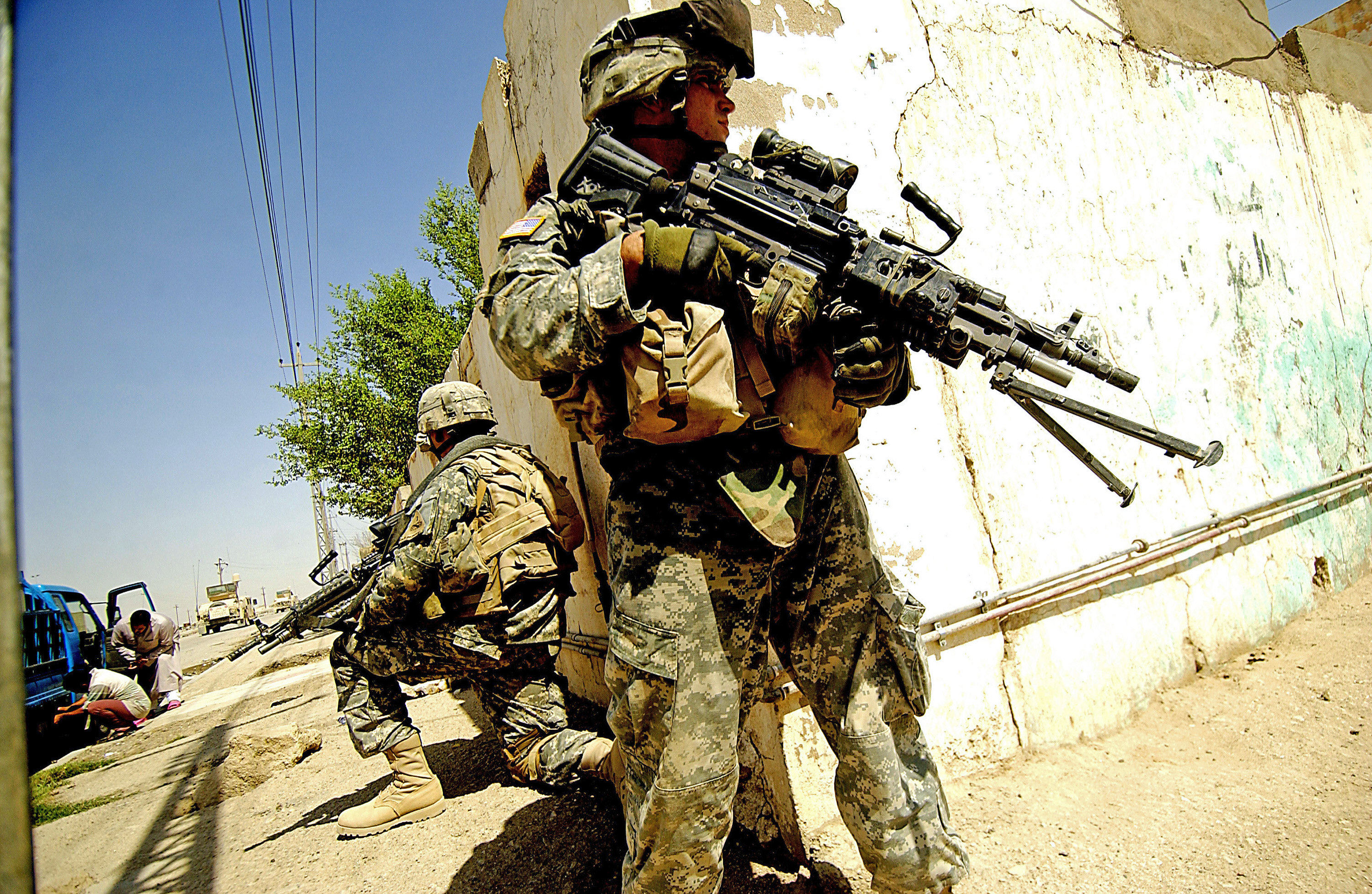
U.S. soldiers from the 6th Infantry Regiment taking up positions on a street corner during a foot patrol in Ramadi, Iraq

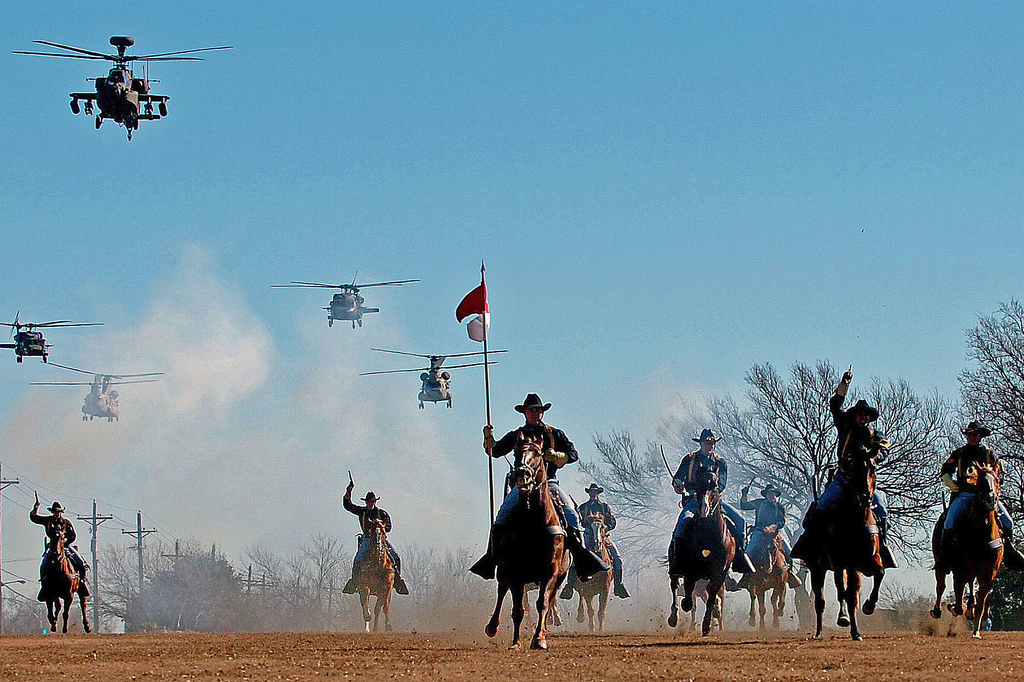
The 1st Cavalry Division's combat aviation brigade performing a mock charge with the horse detachment

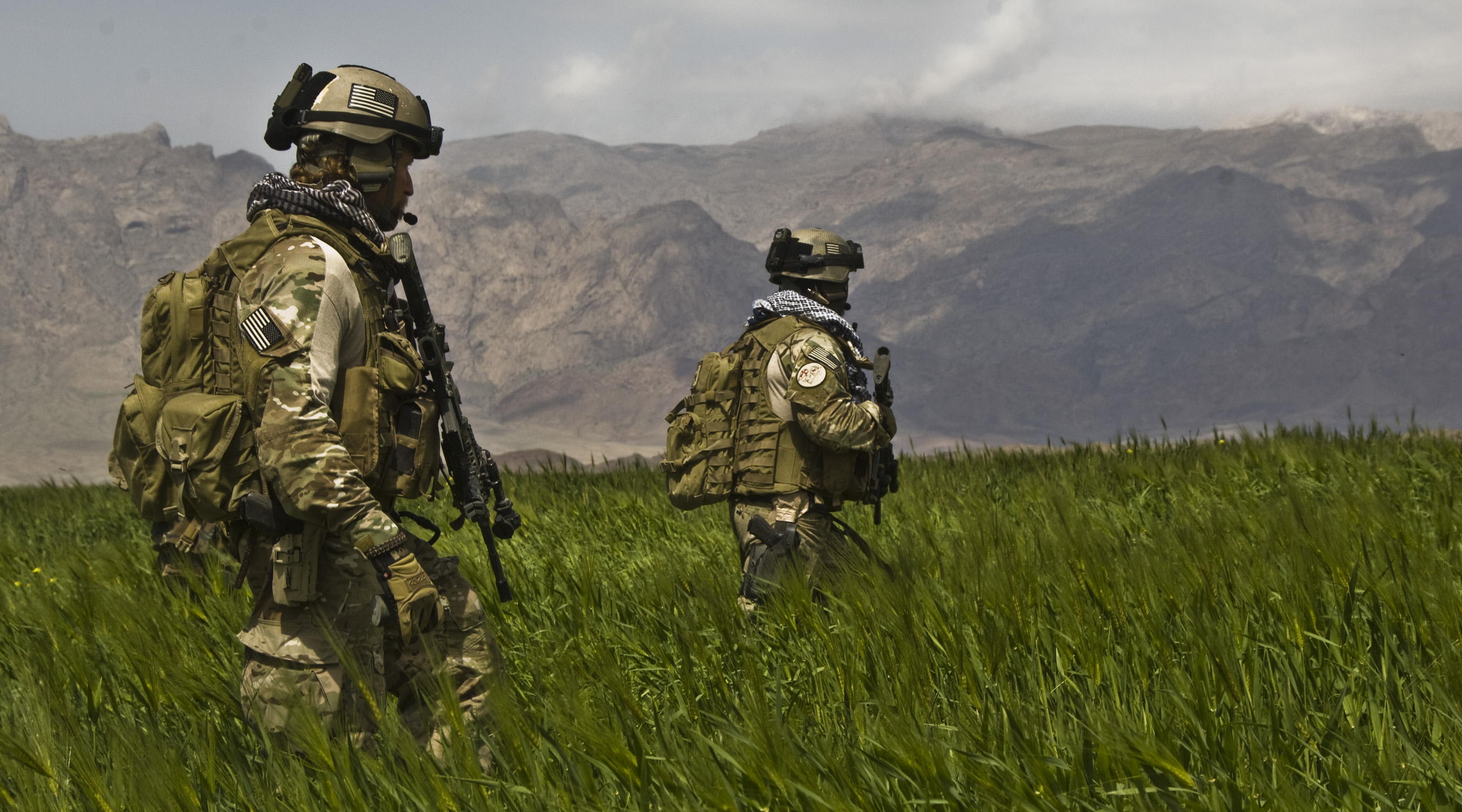
U.S. Army Special Forces soldiers from the 3rd Special Forces Group patrolling a field in the Gulistan district of Farah, Afghanistan

See Structure of the United States Army for a detailed treatment of the history, components, administrative and operational structure and the branches and functional areas of the Army.

The U.S. Army is made up of three components: the active component, the Regular Army; and two reserve components, the Army National Guard and the Army Reserve. Both reserve components are primarily composed of part-time soldiers who train once a month – known as battle assemblies or unit training assemblies (UTAs) – and conduct two to three weeks of annual training each year. Both the Regular Army and the Army Reserve are organized under Title 10 of the United States Code, while the National Guard is organized under Title 32. While the Army National Guard is organized, trained, and equipped as a component of the U.S. Army, when it is not in federal service it is under the command of individual state and territorial governors. However, the District of Columbia National Guard reports to the U.S. president, not the district's mayor, even when not federalized. Any or all of the National Guard can be federalized by presidential order and against the governor's wishes.

The U.S. Army is led by a civilian secretary of the Army, who has the statutory authority to conduct all the affairs of the army under the authority, direction, and control of the secretary of defense. The chief of staff of the Army, who is the highest-ranked military officer in the army, serves as the principal military adviser and executive agent for the secretary of the Army, i.e., its service chief; and as a member of the Joint Chiefs of Staff, a body composed of the service chiefs from each of the four military services belonging to the Department of Defense who advise the president of the United States, the secretary of defense and the National Security Council on operational military matters, under the guidance of the chairman and vice chairman of the Joint Chiefs of Staff. In 1986, the Goldwater–Nichols Act mandated that operational control of the services follows a chain of command from the president to the secretary of defense directly to the unified combatant commanders, who have control of all units in their geographic or functional area of responsibility, thus the secretaries of the military departments (and their respective service chiefs underneath them) only have the responsibility to organize, train and equip their service components. The army provides trained forces to the combatant commanders for use as directed by the secretary of defense.

In 2013, the army shifted to six geographical commands that align with the six geographical unified combatant commands (CCMD):

- United States Army Central headquartered at Shaw Air Force Base, South Carolina
- United States Army North headquartered at Fort Sam Houston, Texas
- United States Army South headquartered at Fort Sam Houston, Texas
- United States Army Europe and Africa headquartered at Clay Kaserne, Wiesbaden, Germany
- United States Army Pacific headquartered at Fort Shafter, Hawaii

The army also transformed its base unit from divisions to brigades. Division lineage will be retained, but the divisional headquarters will be able to command any brigade, not just brigades that carry their divisional lineage. The central part of this plan is that each brigade will be modular, i.e., all brigades of the same type will be exactly the same and thus any brigade can be commanded by any division. As specified before the 2013 end-strength re-definitions, the three major types of brigade combat teams are:

- Armored brigades, with a strength of 4,743 troops as of 2014.
- Stryker brigades, with a strength of 4,500 troops as of 2014.
- Infantry brigades, with a strength of 4,413 troops as of 2014.

In addition, there are combat support and service support modular brigades. Combat support brigades include aviation (CAB) brigades, which will come in heavy and light varieties, fires (artillery) brigades (now transforms to division artillery) and expeditionary military intelligence brigades. Combat service support brigades include sustainment brigades and come in several varieties and serve the standard support role in an army.

=== Combat maneuver organizations ===
To track the effects of the 2018 budget cuts, see Transformation of the United States Army#Divisions and brigades

The U.S. Army's conventional combat capability currently consists of 12 active divisions as well as several independent maneuver units. The 2nd Infantry Division, based in South Korea, is the only active duty division that does not have permanently assigned brigade combat teams (BCTs). The 2nd Infantry Division relies on rotational Stryker BCTs from other divisions based stateside to fulfill the necessary combat-arms role.

From 2013 through 2017, the Army sustained organizational and end-strength reductions after several years of growth. In June 2013, the Army announced plans to downsize to 32 active brigade combat teams by 2015 to match a reduction in active-duty strength to 490,000 soldiers. Army Chief of Staff Raymond Odierno projected that the Army was to shrink to "450,000 in the active component, 335,000 in the National Guard and 195,000 in U.S. Army Reserve" by 2018. However, this plan was scrapped by the incoming Trump administration, with subsequent plans to expand the Army by 16,000 soldiers to a total of 476,000 by October 2017. The National Guard and the Army Reserve will see a smaller expansion.

The Army's maneuver organization was most recently altered by the reorganization of United States Army Alaska into the 11th Airborne Division, transferring the 1st and 4th Brigade Combat Teams of the 25th Infantry Division under a separate operational headquarters to reflect the brigades' distinct, Arctic-oriented mission. As part of the reorganization, the 1–11 (formerly 1–25) Stryker Brigade Combat Team will reorganize as an Infantry Brigade Combat Team. Following this transition, the active component BCTs will number 11 Armored brigades, 6 Stryker brigades, and 14 Infantry brigades.

Within the Army National Guard and United States Army Reserve, there are a further eight divisions, 27 brigade combat teams, additional combat support and combat service support brigades, and independent cavalry, infantry, artillery, aviation, engineer, and support battalions. The Army Reserve in particular provides virtually all psychological operations and civil affairs units.

United States Army Europe and Africa (USAREUR-AF)

Direct reporting units	Current commander	Location of headquarters
V Corps	LTG Charles Costanza	Fort Knox, Kentucky

United States Army Western Hemisphere Command (USAWHC)

Direct reporting units	Current commander	Location of headquarters
XVIII Airborne Corps	LTG Gregory K. Anderson	Fort Bragg, North Carolina
First Army	LTG Mark H. Landes	Rock Island Arsenal, Illinois
III Armored Corps	LTG Kevin Admiral	Fort Hood, Texas

United States Army Pacific (USARPAC)

Direct reporting units	Current commander	Location of headquarters
I Corps	LTG Matthew McFarlane	Joint Base Lewis-McChord, Washington
Eighth Army	LTG Joseph E. Hilbert	Camp Humphreys, South Korea

Active combat maneuver units
Name	Headquarters	Subunits	Subordinate to
1st Armored Division	Fort Bliss, Texas	3 armored brigade combat teams, 1st Armored Division Artillery (United States), 1 Combat Aviation Brigade, and 1 sustainment brigade	III Armor Corps
1st Cavalry Division	Fort Hood, Texas	3 armored BCTs, 1st Cavalry Division Artillery (United States), 1 CAB, and 1 sustainment brigade	III Armor Corps
1st Infantry Division	Fort Riley, Kansas	2 armored BCTs, 1 1st Infantry Division Artillery (United States), 1 CAB, and 1 sustainment brigade	III Armor Corps
2nd Infantry Division	Camp Humphreys, South Korea	1 mechanized brigade from the ROK Army, a stateside Stryker BCT from another active division that is rotated in on a regular basis, 2nd Infantry Division Artillery (United States), 1 field artillery brigade, 1 CAB, and 1 sustainment brigade.	Eighth Army
2nd Cavalry Regiment	Rose Barracks, Vilseck, Germany	4 Stryker squadrons, 1 engineer squadron, 1 fires squadron and 1 support squadron	V Corps
3rd Infantry Division	Fort Stewart, Georgia	2 armored BCT, Divisional Artillery, Aviation Brigade and 1 sustainment brigade	XVIII Airborne Corps
3rd Cavalry Regiment	Fort Hood, Texas	4 Stryker squadrons, 1 fires squadron, 1 engineer squadron, and 1 support squadron (overseen by the 1st Cavalry Division)	III Armor Corps
4th Infantry Division	Fort Carson, Colorado	3 Stryker BCT, Divisional Artillery, 1 CAB and 1 sustainment brigade	I Corps
7th Infantry Division (MDC-PAC)	Joint Base Lewis–McChord, Washington	2 Stryker BCTs, 1 MDTF, and 1 CAB	I Corps
10th Mountain Division	Fort Drum, New York	3 infantry BCTs, 1 10th Mountain Division Artillery (United States), 1 CAB and 1 sustainment brigade	XVIII Airborne Corps
11th Airborne Division	Joint Base Elmendorf–Richardson, Alaska	1 airborne infantry BCT, 1 infantry BCT, 1 aviation command and 1 sustainment battalion	I Corps
25th Infantry Division	Schofield Barracks, Hawaii	2 infantry BCTs, 1 DIVARTY, 1 CAB, and 1 sustainment brigade	I Corps
82nd Airborne Division	Fort Bragg, North Carolina	3 airborne infantry BCTs, 1 airborne DIVARTY, 1 airborne CAB and 1 airborne sustainment brigade	XVIII Airborne Corps
101st Airborne Division (Air Assault)	Fort Campbell, Kentucky	3 infantry BCTs, 1 DIVARTY, 1 CAB and 1 sustainment brigade	XVIII Airborne Corps
173rd Airborne Brigade	Camp Ederle, Vicenza, Italy	2 airborne infantry battalions, 1 airborne field artillery battalion, 1 airborne cavalry squadron, 1 airborne engineer battalion, and 1 airborne support battalion	Southern European Task Force, Africa

Combat maneuver units under the Army National Guard until federalized
Name	Locations (Note: Includes aligned separate brigades, when federalized)
28th Infantry Division	Pennsylvania, Ohio and Maryland
29th Infantry Division	Virginia, Maryland and North Carolina
34th Infantry Division	Minnesota, Wisconsin, Iowa, Wyoming and Idaho
35th Infantry Division	Kansas, Missouri, Illinois, Oklahoma, Georgia, Arkansas, and Nebraska
36th Infantry Division	Texas, Louisiana, Tennessee and Mississippi
38th Infantry Division	Indiana, Michigan, Ohio and Kentucky
40th Infantry Division	Arizona, California, Hawaii, Oregon, and Washington
42nd Infantry Division	Connecticut, Maine, Maryland, Massachusetts, New Hampshire, New Jersey, New York, Rhode Island, and Vermont

Separate infantry brigades under the Army National Guard until federalized
Name	Location	Notes
27th Infantry BCT	New York	Aligned to the 42nd Infantry Division, but administratively a separate brigade
29th Infantry BCT	Hawaii	Aligned to the 40th Infantry Division, but administratively a separate brigade
32nd Infantry BCT	Wisconsin	Aligned to the 34th Infantry Division, but administratively a separate brigade
33rd Infantry BCT	Illinois	Aligned to the 35th Infantry Division, but administratively a separate brigade
37th Infantry BCT	Ohio	Aligned to the 38th Infantry Division, but administratively a separate brigade
39th Infantry BCT	Arkansas	Aligned to the 35th Infantry Division, but administratively a separate brigade
41st Infantry BCT	Oregon	Aligned to the 40th Infantry Division, but administratively a separate brigade
44th Infantry BCT	New Jersey	Aligned to the 42nd Infantry Division, but administratively a separate brigade
45th Infantry BCT	Oklahoma	Aligned to the 35th Infantry Division, but administratively a separate brigade
48th Infantry BCT	Georgia	Aligned to the 29th Infantry Division, but administratively a separate brigade
53rd Infantry BCT	Florida	Aligned to the 29th Infantry Division, but administratively a separate brigade
56th Infantry BCT	Texas	Aligned to the 36th Infantry Division, but administratively a separate brigade
72nd Infantry BCT	Texas	Aligned to the 36th Infantry Division, but administratively a separate brigade
76th Mobile Brigade Combat Team	Indiana	Aligned to the 38th Infantry Division, but administratively a separate brigade
79th Infantry BCT	California	Aligned to the 40th Infantry Division, but administratively a separate brigade
86th Infantry BCT	Vermont	Aligned to the 42nd Infantry Division, but administratively a separate brigade
116th Mobile Brigade Combat Team	Virginia	Aligned to the 29th Infantry Division, but administratively a separate brigade
256th Infantry Brigade Combat Team	Louisiana	Aligned to the 36th Infantry Division, but administratively a separate brigade

For a description of U.S. Army tactical organizational structure, see: a U.S. context and also a global context.

== Special Operations Forces ==
United States Army Special Operations Command (Airborne) (USASOC):

Name	Headquarters	Structure and purpose
1st Special Forces Command	Fort Bragg, North Carolina	Manages seven special forces groups designed to deploy and execute nine doctrinal missions: unconventional warfare, foreign internal defense, direct action, counter-insurgency, special reconnaissance, counter-terrorism, information operations, counterproliferation of weapons of mass destruction, and security force assistance. The command also manages two psychological operations groups—tasked to work with foreign nations to induce or reinforce behavior favorable to U.S. objectives—a civil affairs brigade—that enables military commanders and U.S. ambassadors to improve relationships with various stakeholders via five battalions—and a sustainment brigade—that provides combat service support and combat health support units via three distinct battalions.
Army Special Operations Aviation Command	Fort Bragg, North Carolina	Commands, organizes, mans, trains, resources, and equips Army special operations aviation units to provide responsive, special operations aviation support to special operations forces consisting of five units, including the 160th Special Operations Aviation Regiment (Airborne).
75th Ranger Regiment	Fort Benning, Georgia	In addition to a regimental headquarters, a special troops battalion, and a military intelligence battalion, the 75th Ranger Regiment has three maneuver battalions of elite airborne infantry specializing in large-scale, joint forcible entry operations and precision targeting raids. Additional capabilities include special reconnaissance, air assault, and direct action raids seizing key terrain such as airfields, destroying or securing strategic facilities, and capturing or killing enemies of the Nation. The Regiment also helps develop the equipment, technologies, training, and readiness that bridge the gap between special operations and traditional combat maneuver organizations.
John F. Kennedy Special Warfare Center and School	Fort Bragg, North Carolina	Selects and trains special forces, civil affairs, and psychological operations soldiers, consisting of two groups and other various training units and offices.
1st Special Forces Operational Detachment-Delta	Fort Bragg, North Carolina	Commonly referred to as Delta Force, Combat Applications Group (CAG), "The Unit", Army Compartmented Element (ACE), or Task Force Green, SFOD–D is the U.S. Army's Tier 1 Special Mission Unit tasked with performing the most complex, classified, and dangerous missions directed by the National Command Authority. Under the control of Joint Special Operations Command, SFOD–D specializes in hostage rescue, counter-terrorism, direct action, and special reconnaissance against high-value targets via eight squadrons: four assault, one aviation, one clandestine, one combat support, and one nuclear disposal.

== Medical Department ==
The United States Army Medical Department (AMEDD), formerly the Army Medical Service (AMS), is the primary healthcare organization of the United States Army and is led by the Surgeon General of the United States Army (TSG), a three-star lieutenant general, who (by policy) also serves as the Commanding General, United States Army Medical Command (MEDCOM). TSG is assisted by a Deputy Surgeon General and a full staff, the Office of the Surgeon General (OTSG). The incumbent Surgeon General is Lieutenant General Mary K. Izaguirre (since 25 January 2024).

AMEDD encompasses the Army's six non-combat, medical-focused specialty branches (or "Corps"), these branches are: the Medical Corps, Nurse Corps, Dental Corps, Veterinary Corps, Medical Service Corps, and Medical Specialist Corps. Each of these branches is headed by a Corps Chief that reports directly to the Surgeon General.

== Personnel ==
The Army's Talent Management Task Force (TMTF) has deployed IPPS-A, the Integrated Personnel and Pay System - Army, an app which serves the National Guard, and on 17 January 2023 the Army Reserve and Active Army. Soldiers were reminded to update their information using the legacy systems to keep their payroll and personnel information current by December 2021. IPPS-A is the Human Resources system for the Army, is available for download for Android, or the Apple store. It will be used for future promotions and other personnel decisions. Among the changes are:

- BCAP, the Battalion Commander Assessment Program. In January 2020, over 800 majors and lieutenant colonels from all over the Army converged on Fort Knox to take part in a five-day program to select the next battalion commanders for the Army (beginning in FY2021). This process replaces the former selection process which was based solely on rank and individual reviews of past performance. From now on, more consideration will be given to an individual officer's personal preference, as part of 25 other selection criteria. "Promotion boards will now be able to see almost all substantiated adverse information". The promotion boards will be able to see anything in an officer's human resource record. Officers are encouraged to become familiar with their human resource record, and to file rebuttals to adverse information.
- Depending on the success of this initiative, other assessment programs could be instituted as well, for promotion to sergeants major, and for assessment of colonels for command.

Below are the U.S. Army ranks authorized for use today and their equivalent NATO designations. Although no living officer currently holds the rank of General of the Army, it is still authorized by Congress for use in wartime.

=== Officers ===
There are several paths to becoming a commissioned officer including the United States Military Academy, Reserve Officers' Training Corps, Officer Candidate School, and direct commissioning. Regardless of which road an officer takes, the insignia are the same. Certain professions including physicians, pharmacists, nurses, lawyers and chaplains are commissioned directly into the Army.

Most army commissioned officers (those who are generalists) are promoted based on an "up or out" system. A more flexible talent management process is underway. The Defense Officer Personnel Management Act of 1980 establishes rules for the timing of promotions and limits the number of officers that can serve at any given time.

Army regulations call for addressing all personnel with the rank of general as "General (last name)" regardless of the number of stars. Likewise, both colonels and lieutenant colonels are addressed as "Colonel (last name)" and first and second lieutenants as "Lieutenant (last name)".

US DoW pay grade	Special grade (Note: Reserved for wartime use only.)	O-10	O-9	O-8	O-7	O-6	O-5	O-4	O-3	O-2	O-1
NATO code	OF-10	OF-9	OF-8	OF-7	OF-6	OF-5	OF-4	OF-3	OF-2	OF-1
Insignia
Army Green Service Uniform
Title	General of the Army	General	Lieutenant general	Major general	Brigadier general	Colonel	Lieutenant colonel	Major	Captain	First lieutenant	Second lieutenant
Abbreviation	GA	GEN	LTG	MG	BG	COL	LTC	MAJ	CPT	1LT	2LT

=== Warrant officers ===
Warrant officers are single track, specialty officers with subject matter expertise in a particular area. They are initially appointed as warrant officers (in the rank of WO1) by the secretary of the Army, but receive their commission upon promotion to chief warrant officer two (CW2).

By regulation, warrant officers are addressed as "Mr. (last name)" or "Ms. (last name)" by senior officers and as "sir" or "ma'am" by all enlisted personnel. However, many personnel address warrant officers as "Chief (last name)" within their units regardless of rank.

US DoD pay grade	W-5	W-4	W-3	W-2	W-1
NATO code	WO-5	WO-4	WO-3	WO-2	WO-1
Insignia
Army Green Service Uniform
Title	Chief warrant officer 5	Chief warrant officer 4	Chief warrant officer 3	Chief warrant officer 2	Warrant officer 1
Abbreviation	CW5	CW4	CW3	CW2	WO1

=== Enlisted personnel ===
Sergeants and corporals are referred to as NCOs, short for non-commissioned officers. This distinguishes corporals from the more numerous specialists who have the same pay grade but do not exercise leadership responsibilities. Beginning in 2021, all corporals will be required to conduct structured self-development for the NCO ranks, completing the basic leader course (BLC), or else be laterally assigned as specialists. Specialists who have completed BLC and who have been recommended for promotion will be permitted to wear corporal rank before their recommended promotion as NCOs.

Privates and privates first class (E3) are addressed as "Private (last name)", specialists as "Specialist (last name)", corporals as "Corporal (last name)" and sergeants, staff sergeants, sergeants first class and master sergeants all as "Sergeant (last name)". First sergeants are addressed as "First Sergeant (last name)" and sergeants major and command sergeants major are addressed as "Sergeant Major (last name)".

US DoD pay grade	E-9 Special (Note: SEAC, SMA, and SEA all have E-9 pay grades but are given unique pay.)			E-9		E-8		E-7	E-6	E-5	E-4		E-3	E-2	E-1
NATO code	OR-9					OR-8		OR-7	OR-6	OR-5	OR-4		OR-3	OR-2	OR-1
Army Green Service Uniform															No insignia
Title	Senior enlisted advisor to the chairman	Sergeant major of the Army	Senior enlisted advisor to the chief of the National Guard Bureau	Command sergeant major	Sergeant major	First sergeant	Master sergeant	Sergeant first class	Staff sergeant	Sergeant	Corporal	Specialist	Private first class	Private	Private
Abbreviation	SEAC	SMA	SEA	CSM	SGM	1SG (Note: First sergeant is considered a temporary and lateral rank and is senior to master sergeant. A first sergeant can revert to master sergeant upon leaving assignment.)	MSG	SFC	SSG	SGT	CPL	SPC (Note: SP4 is sometimes encountered as an abbreviation for specialist instead of SPC. This is a holdover from when there were additional specialist ranks at pay grades E-5 to E-7.)	PFC	PV2 (Note: PVT is also used as an abbreviation for both private ranks when pay grade need not be distinguished.)	PV1

=== Training ===
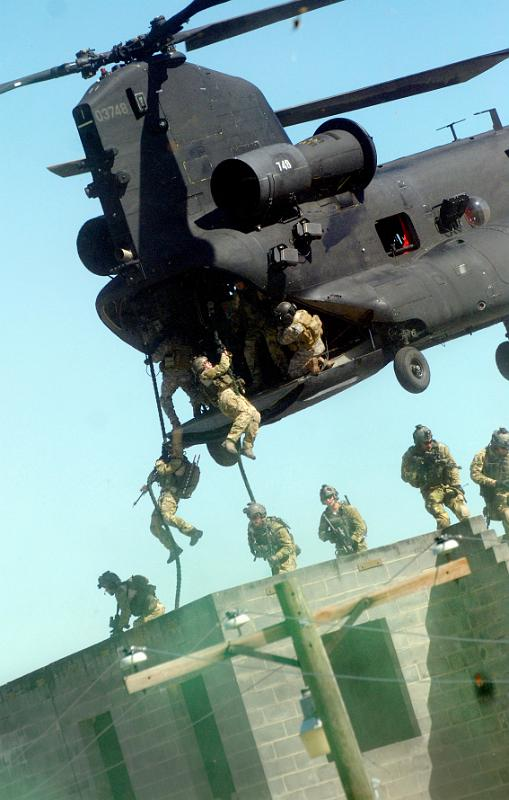
U.S. Army Rangers practicing fast roping techniques from an MH-47 during an exercise at Fort Bragg

Training in the U.S. Army is generally divided into two categories – individual and collective. Because of COVID-19 precautions, the first two weeks of basic training — not including processing and out-processing – incorporate social distancing and indoor desk-oriented training. Once the recruits have tested negative for COVID-19 for two weeks, the remaining 8 weeks follow the traditional activities for most recruits, followed by Advanced Individualized Training (AIT) where they receive training for their military occupational specialties (MOS). Some individual's MOSs range anywhere from 14 to 20 weeks of One Station Unit Training (OSUT), which combines Basic Training and AIT. The length of AIT school varies by the MOS. The length of time spent in AIT depends on the soldier's MOS. Certain highly technical MOS training requires many months (e.g., foreign language translators). Depending on the army's needs, Basic Combat Training for combat arms soldiers is conducted at several locations. Still, two of the longest-running are the Armor School and the Infantry School, both at Fort Benning, Georgia. Sergeant Major of the Army Dailey notes that an infantrymen's pilot program for One Station Unit Training (OSUT) extends 8 weeks beyond Basic Training and AIT, to 22 weeks. The pilot, designed to boost infantry readiness ended in December 2018. The new Infantry OSUT covered the M240 machine gun as well as the M249 squad automatic weapon. The redesigned Infantry OSUT started in 2019. Depending on the result of the 2018 pilot, OSUTs could also extend training in other combat arms beyond the infantry. One Station Unit Training will be extended to 22 weeks for Armor by Fiscal Year 2021. Additional OSUTs are expanding to Cavalry, Engineer, and Military Police (MP) in the succeeding Fiscal Years.

A new training assignment for junior officers was instituted, that they serve as platoon leaders for Basic Combat Training (BCT) platoons. These lieutenants will assume many of the administrative, logistical, and day-to-day tasks formerly performed by the drill sergeants of those platoons and are expected to "lead, train, and assist with maintaining and enhancing the morale, welfare and readiness" of the drill sergeants and their BCT platoons. These lieutenants are also expected to stem any inappropriate behaviors they witness in their platoons, to free up the drill sergeants for training.

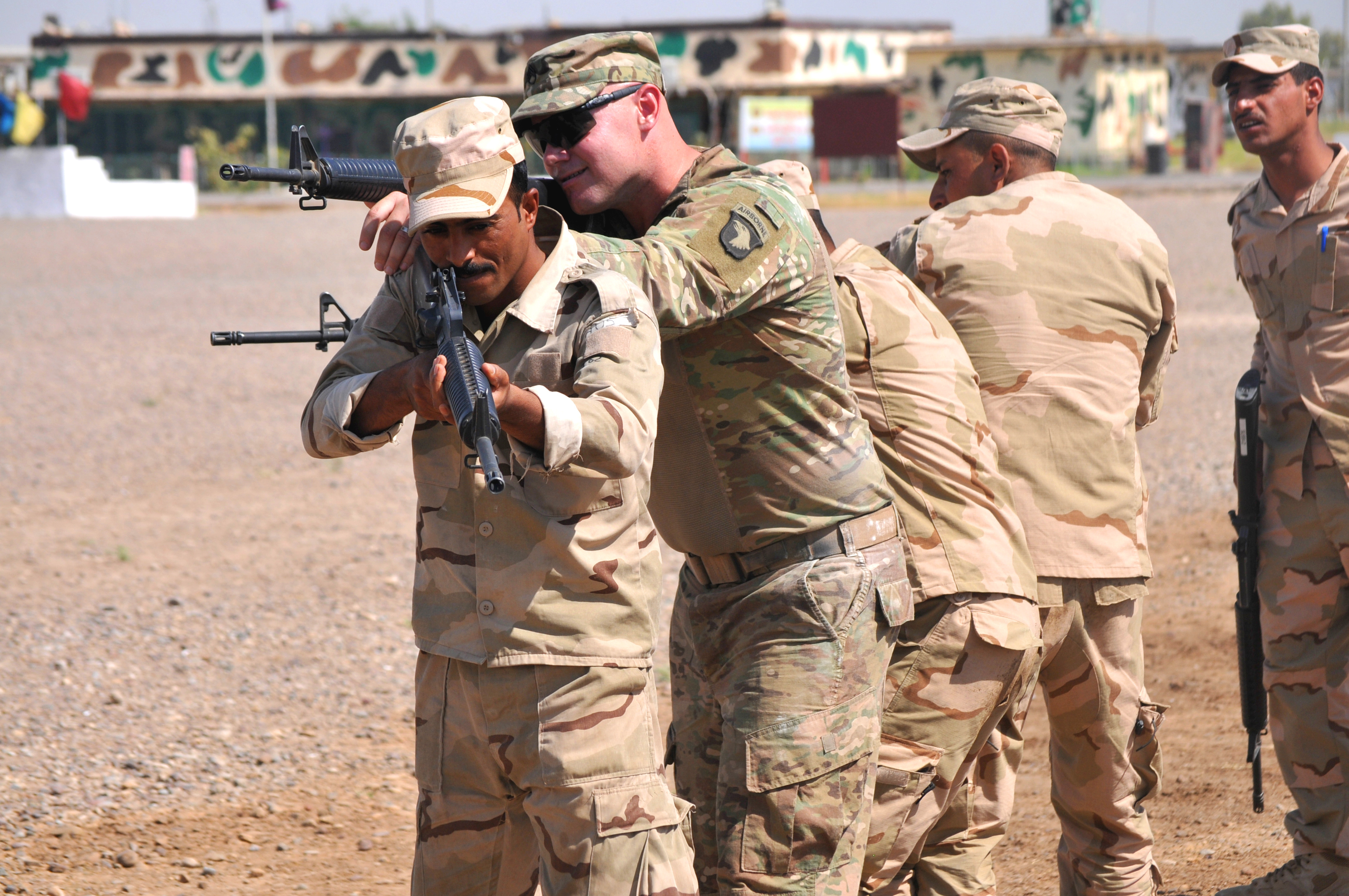
A trainer with Company A, 1st Battalion 502nd Infantry Regiment, Task Force Strike, 101st Airborne Division assisting Iraqi army ranger students during a room clearing drill at Camp Taji, Iraq on 18 July 2016

The United States Army Combat Fitness Test (ACFT) was introduced in 2018 to 60 battalions spread throughout the Army. The test and scoring system is the same for all soldiers, regardless of gender. It takes an hour to complete, including rest periods. The ACFT supersedes the Army Physical Fitness Test (APFT), as being more relevant to survival in combat. Six events were determined to better predict which muscle groups of the body were adequately conditioned for combat actions: three deadlifts, a standing power throw of a ten-pound medicine ball, hand-release pushups (which replace the traditional pushup), a sprint/drag/carry 250 yard event, three pull-ups with leg tucks (or a plank test in lieu of the leg tuck), a mandatory rest period, and a two-mile run. As of 1 October 2020 all soldiers from all three components (Regular Army, Reserve, and National Guard) are subject to this test. The ACFT now tests all soldiers in basic training as of October 2020. The ACFT became the official test of record on 1 October 2020; before that day, every Army unit was required to complete a diagnostic ACFT< (All Soldiers with valid APFT scores can use them until March 2022. The Holistic Health and Fitness (H2F) System is one way that soldiers can prepare.). The ACFT movements directly translate to movements on the battlefield. Following their basic and advanced training at the individual level, soldiers may choose to continue their training and apply for an "additional skill identifier" (ASI). The ASI allows the army to take a wide-ranging MOS and focus it on a more specific MOS. For example, a combat medic, whose duties are to provide pre-hospital emergency treatment, may receive ASI training to become a cardiovascular specialist, a dialysis specialist, or even a licensed practical nurse. For commissioned officers, training includes pre-commissioning training, known as Basic Officer Leader Course A, either at USMA or via ROTC, or by completing OCS. After commissioning, officers undergo branch-specific training at the Basic Officer Leaders Course B, (formerly called Officer Basic Course), which varies in time and location according to their future assignments. Officers will continue to attend standardized training at different stages of their careers.

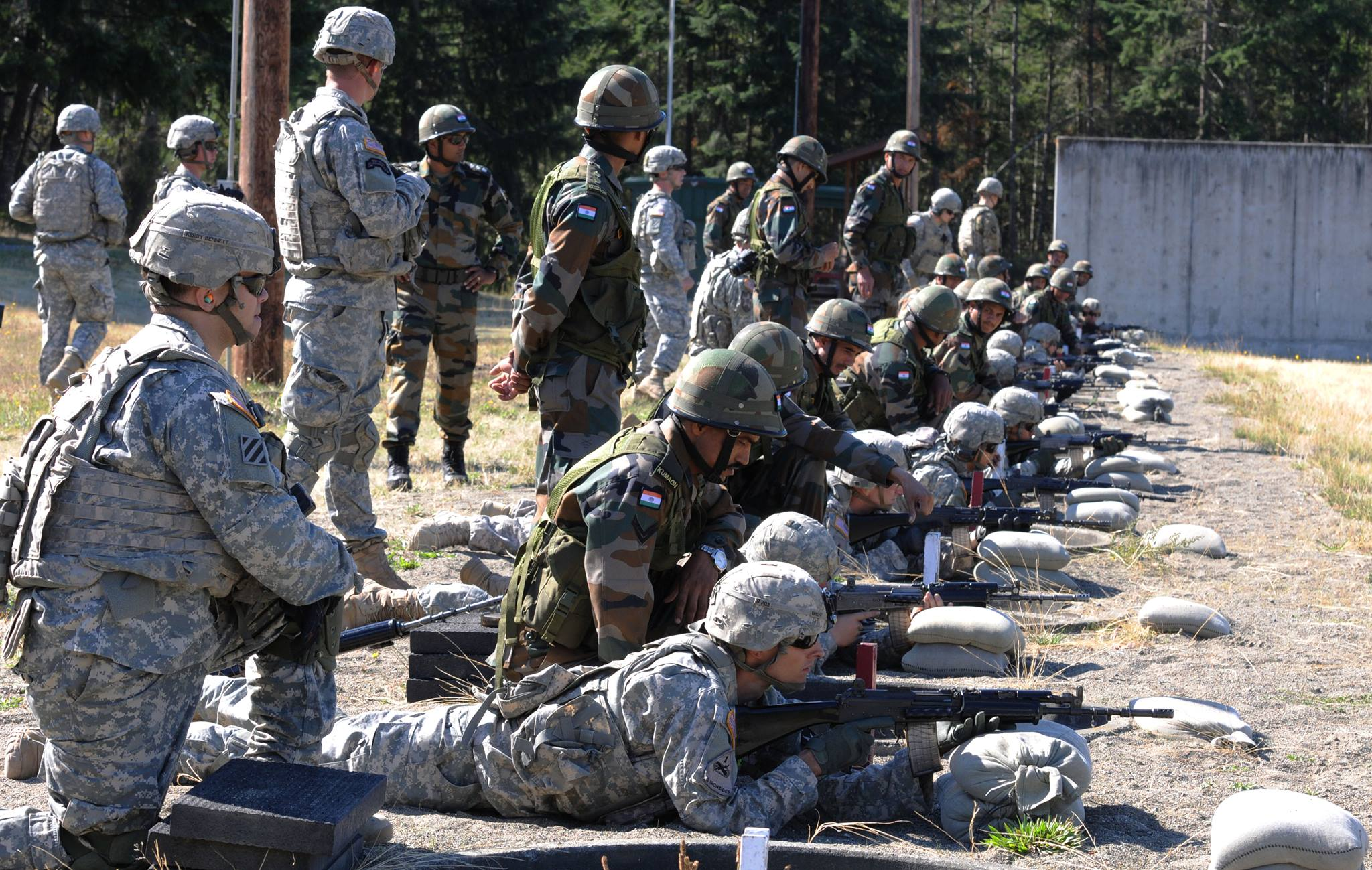
U.S. Army soldiers familiarizing with the latest INSAS 1B1 during exercise Yudh Abhyas 2015

Collective training at the unit level takes place at the unit's assigned station, but the most intensive training at higher echelons is conducted at the three combat training centers (CTC); the National Training Center (NTC) at Fort Irwin, California, the Joint Readiness Training Center (JRTC) at Fort Johnson, Louisiana and the Joint Multinational Training Center (JMRC) at the Hohenfels Training Area in Hohenfels and Grafenwöhr, Germany. ReARMM is the Army Force Generation process approved in 2020 to meet the need to continuously replenish forces for deployment at the unit level and for other echelons as required by the mission. Individual-level replenishment still requires training at a unit level, which is conducted at the continental U.S. (CONUS) replacement center (CRC) at Fort Bliss, in New Mexico and Texas before their individual deployment.

==== Future Soldier Prep Course ====
The United States Army has faced recruiting challenges since the COVID-19 pandemic. The Army has implemented the Future Soldier Prep Course (FSPC) to address these issues. This program is designed to assist potential recruits who may initially need to meet the Army's physical fitness or academic standards.

In the fiscal year ending 30 September 2023, approximately 13,000 of the 55,000 recruits, or 24%, participated in the FSPC. This indicates a significant reliance on the program to fill recruitment quotas.

The FSPC offers both physical fitness and academic training. However, most participants enroll in the academic component, which focuses on subjects like basic math, English, and other essential skills.

== Equipment ==
The chief of staff of the Army has identified six modernization priorities, these being (in order): artillery, ground vehicles, aircraft, network, air/missile defense, and soldier lethality.

=== Weapons ===
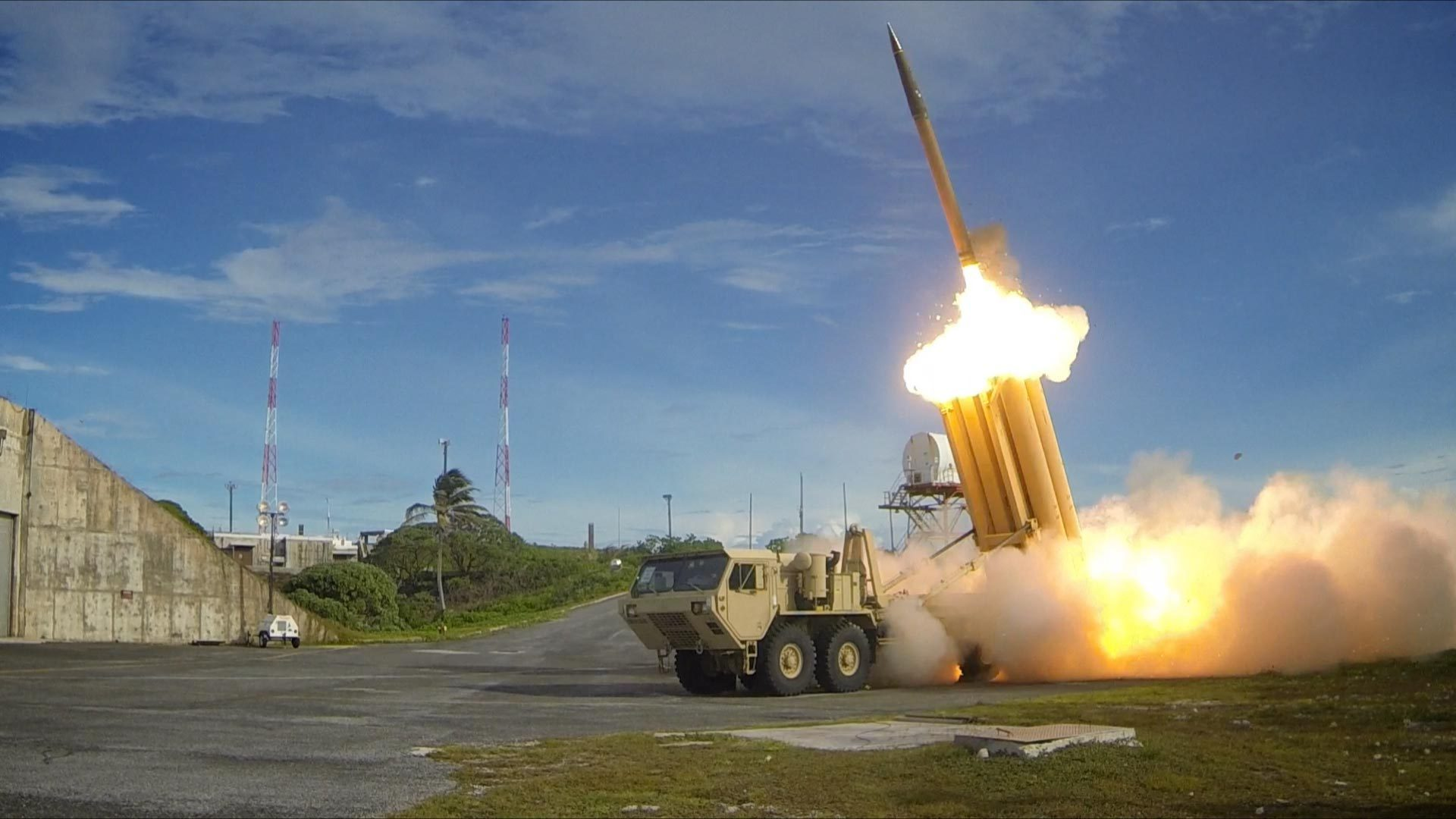
A Lockheed Martin Terminal High Altitude Area Defense (THAAD) system used for ballistic missile protection

==== Individual weapons ====
The United States Army employs various weapons to provide light firepower at short ranges. The most common weapon type used by the army is the M4 carbine, a compact variant of the M16 rifle, which is being replaced gradually by the M7 rifle among close combat units. The primary sidearm in the U.S. Army is the M17 pistol through the Modular Handgun System program. Soldiers are also equipped with various hand grenades, such as the M67 fragmentation grenade and M18 smoke grenade.

Many units are supplemented with a variety of specialized weapons, including the M249 SAW (Squad Automatic Weapon), to provide suppressive fire at the squad level. Some units, such as the 10th Mountain Division, have replaced their M249s with Mk 48s. Indirect fire is provided by the M320 grenade launcher. The M1014 Joint Service Combat Shotgun or the Mossberg 590 Shotgun are used for door breaching and close-quarters combat. The M14EBR is used by designated marksmen. Snipers use the M107 Long Range Sniper Rifle, the M2010 Enhanced Sniper Rifle and the M110 Semi-Automatic Sniper Rifle.

==== Crew-served weapons ====
The army employs various crew-served weapons to provide heavy firepower at ranges exceeding that of individual weapons.

The M240 is the U.S. Army's standard Medium Machine Gun. The M2 heavy machine gun is generally used as a vehicle-mounted machine gun. In the same way, the 40 mm MK 19 grenade machine gun is mainly used by motorized units.

The U.S. Army uses three types of mortar for indirect fire support when heavier artillery may not be appropriate or available. The smallest of these is the 60 mm M224, normally assigned at the infantry company level. At the next higher echelon, infantry battalions are typically supported by a section of 81 mm M252 mortars. The largest mortar in the army's inventory is the 120 mm M120/M121, which is usually employed by mechanized units.

Fire support for light infantry units is provided by towed howitzers, including the 105 mm M119A1 and the 155 mm M777.

The U.S. Army utilizes a variety of direct-fire rockets and missiles to provide infantry with an Anti-Armor Capability. The AT4 is an unguided projectile that can destroy armor and bunkers at ranges up to 500 meters. The FIM-92 Stinger is a shoulder-launched, heat seeking anti-aircraft missile. The FGM-148 Javelin and BGM-71 TOW are anti-tank guided missiles.

=== Vehicles ===
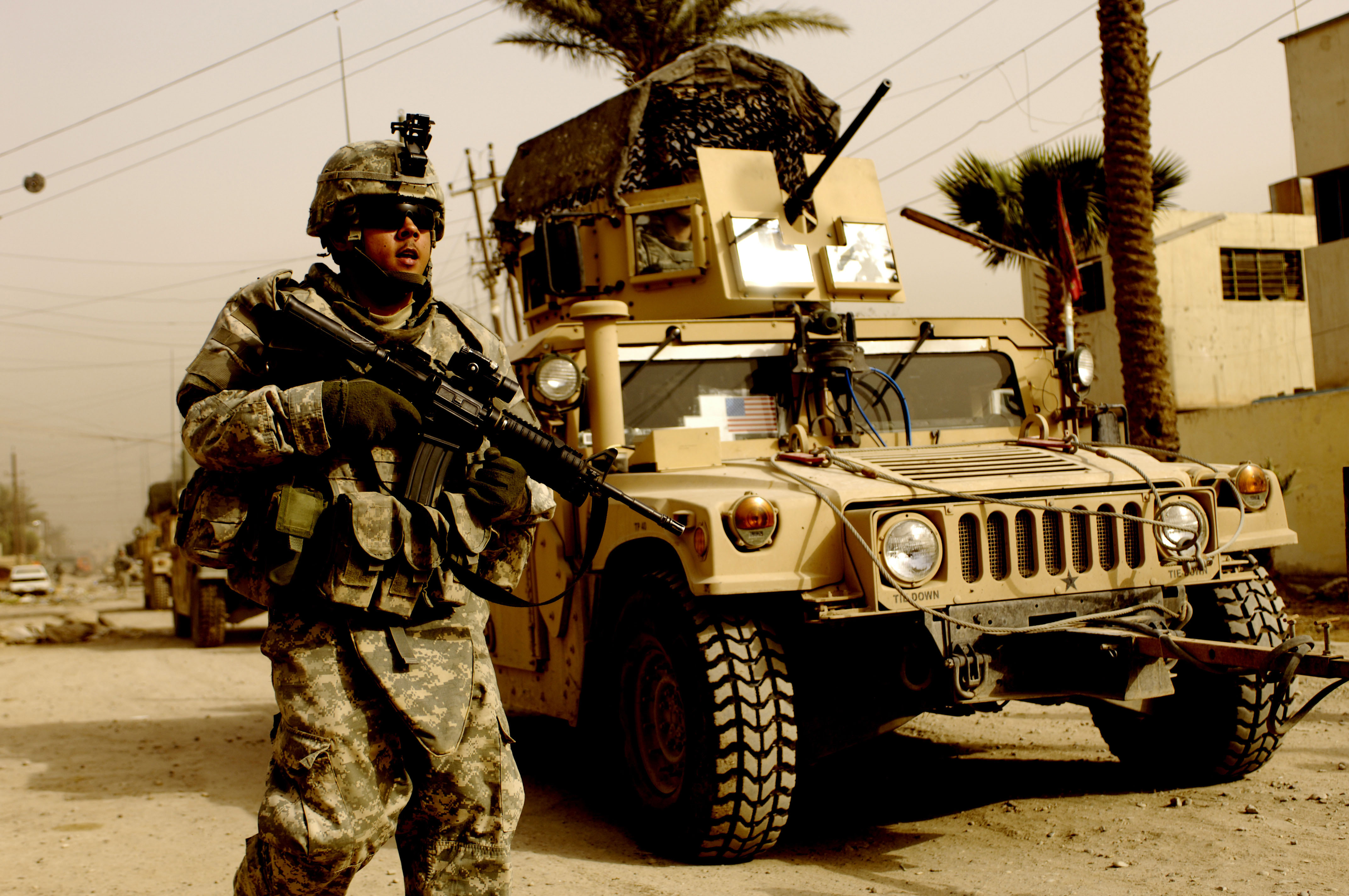
A U.S. soldier on patrol in Iraq with the support of a Humvee vehicle

U.S. Army doctrine puts a premium on mechanized warfare. It fields the highest vehicle-to-soldier ratio in the world as of 2019. The army's most common vehicle is the High Mobility Multipurpose Wheeled Vehicle (HMMWV), commonly called the Humvee, which is capable of serving as a cargo/troop carrier, weapons platform and ambulance, among many other roles. While they operate a wide variety of combat support vehicles, one of the most common types centers on the family of HEMTT vehicles. The M1A2 Abrams is the army's main battle tank, while the M2A3 Bradley is the standard infantry fighting vehicle. Other vehicles include the Stryker, the M113 armored personnel carrier and multiple types of Mine Resistant Ambush Protected (MRAP) vehicles.

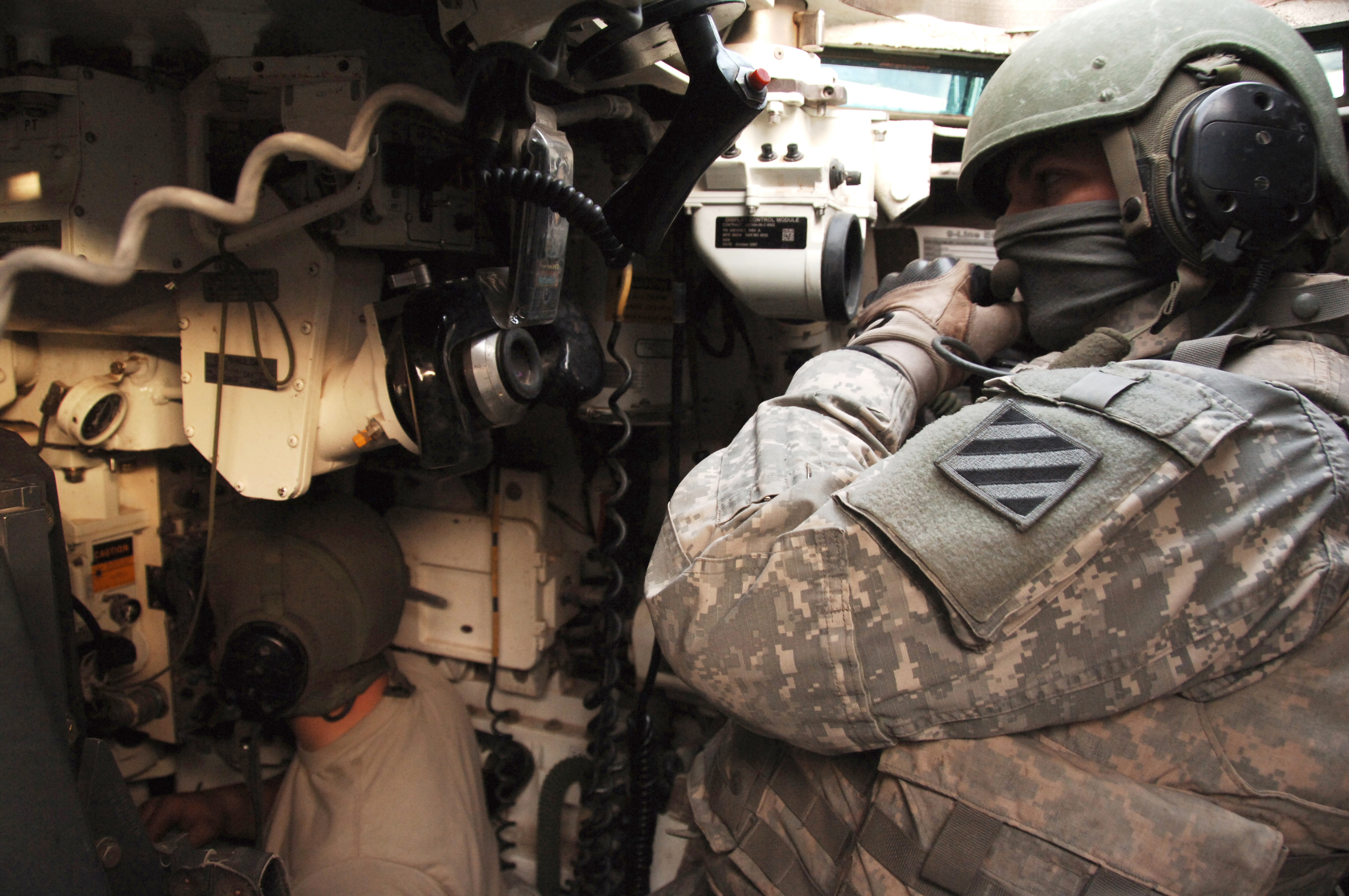
3rd Infantry Division soldiers manning an M1A1 Abrams in Iraq

The U.S. Army's principal artillery weapons are the M109A7 Paladin self-propelled howitzer and the M270 multiple launch rocket system (MLRS), both mounted on tracked platforms and assigned to heavy mechanized units.

=== Aviation ===
While the United States Army Aviation Branch operates a few fixed-wing aircraft, it mainly operates several types of rotary-wing aircraft. These include the AH-64 Apache attack helicopter, the UH-60 Black Hawk utility tactical transport helicopter and the CH-47 Chinook heavy-lift transport helicopter. Restructuring plans call for reduction of 750 aircraft and from seven to four types. The Army is evaluating two fixed-wing aircraft demonstrators; ARES, and Artemis are under evaluation to replace the Guardrail ISR (Intelligence, surveillance and reconnaissance) aircraft. Under the Johnson-McConnell agreement of 1966, the Army agreed to limit its fixed-wing aviation role to administrative mission support (light unarmed aircraft which cannot operate from forward positions). For UAVs, the Army is deploying at least one company of drone MQ-1C Gray Eagles to each Active Army division.

=== Uniforms ===
The Army Combat Uniform (ACU) currently features a camouflage pattern known as Operational Camouflage Pattern (OCP); OCP replaced a pixel-based pattern known as Universal Camouflage Pattern (UCP) in 2019.

On 11 November 2018, the Army announced a new version of 'Army Greens' based on uniforms worn during World War II that will become the standard garrison service uniform. The blue Army Service Uniform will remain as the dress uniform. The Army Greens are projected to be first fielded in the summer of 2020.

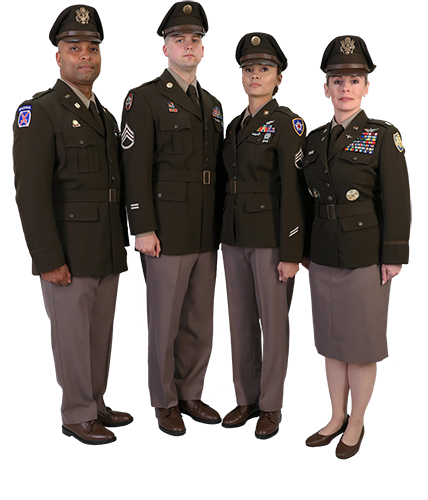
The 2020 Army Greens uniform

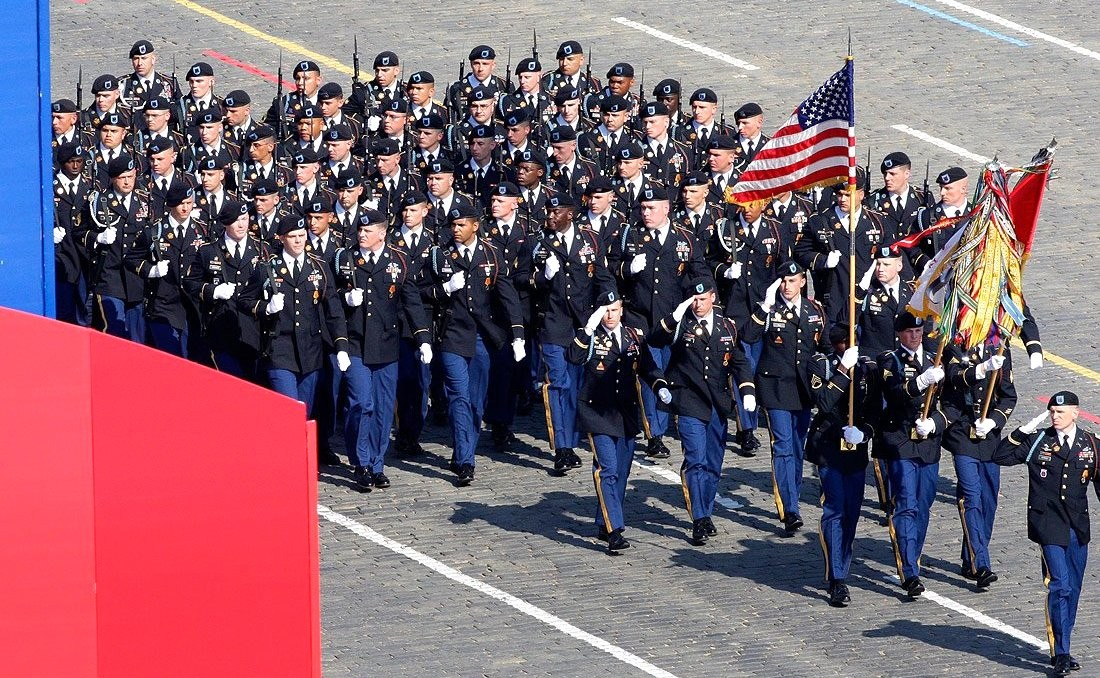
An element of the 18th Infantry Regiment, wearing ASUs, representing the United States at the 2010 Moscow Victory Day Parade

==== Berets ====
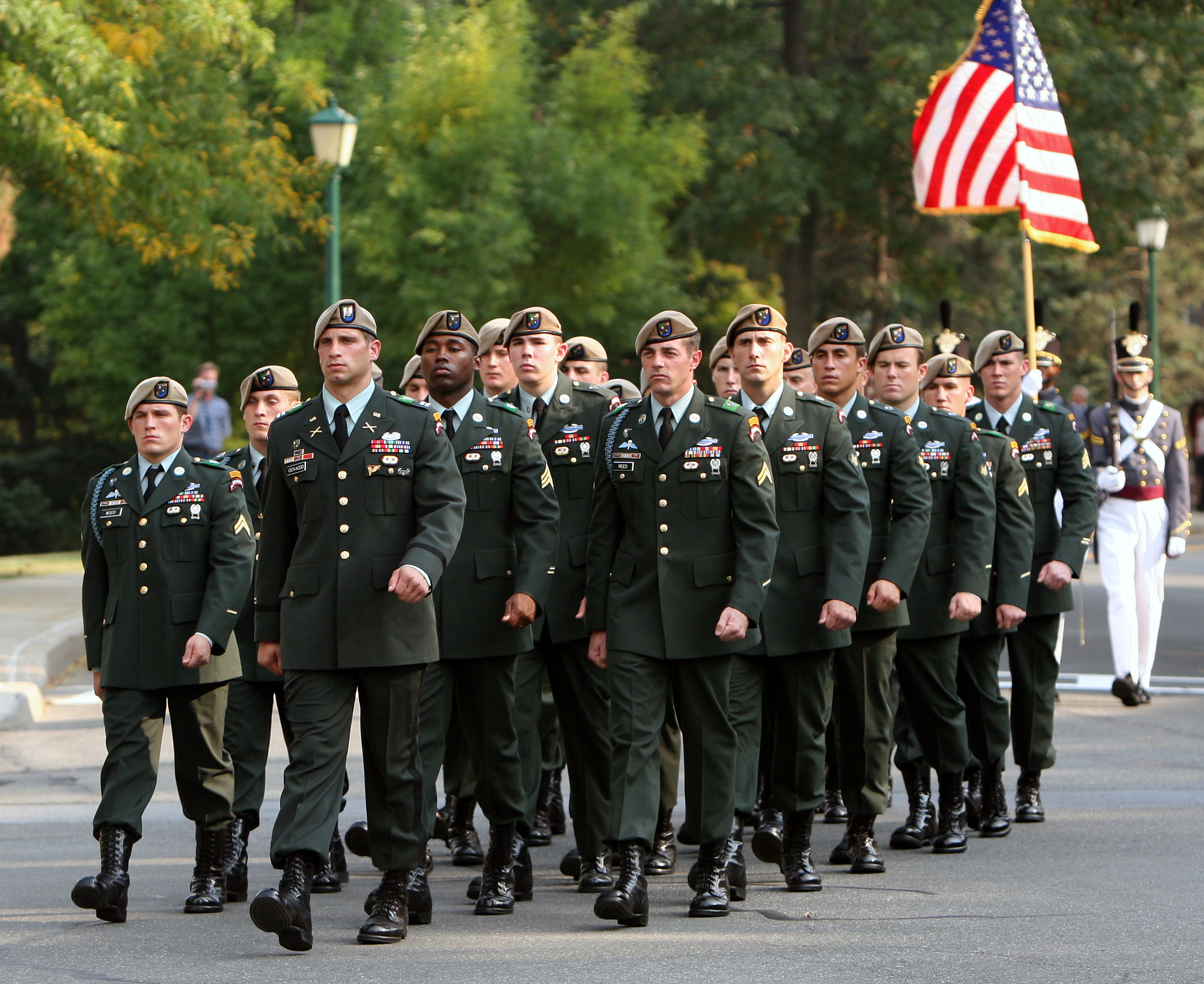
The Ranger Honor Platoon marching in their tan berets and former service uniform

The beret flash of enlisted personnel displays their distinctive unit insignia (shown above). The U.S. Army's black beret is no longer worn with the ACU for garrison duty, having been permanently replaced with the patrol cap. After years of complaints that it was not suited well for most work conditions, Army Chief of Staff General Martin Dempsey eliminated it for wear with the ACU in June 2011. Soldiers who are currently in a unit in jump status still wear berets, whether the wearer is parachute-qualified or not (maroon beret), while members of Security Force Assistance Brigades (SFABs) wear brown berets. Members of the 75th Ranger Regiment and the Airborne and Ranger Training Brigade (tan beret) and Special Forces (rifle green beret) may wear it with the Army Service Uniform for non-ceremonial functions. Unit commanders may still direct the wear of patrol caps in these units in training environments or motor pools.

=== Tents ===
The Army has relied heavily on tents to provide the various facilities needed while on deployment (Force Provider Expeditionary (FPE)). The most common tent uses for the military are as temporary barracks (sleeping quarters), DFAC buildings (dining facilities), forward operating bases (FOBs), after-action review (AAR), tactical operations center (TOC), morale, welfare and recreation (MWR) facilities, as well as security checkpoints. Furthermore, most of these tents are set up and operated through the support of Natick Soldier Systems Center. Each FPE contains billeting, latrines, showers, laundry and kitchen facilities for 50–150 Soldiers, and is stored in Army Prepositioned Stocks 1, 2, 4 and 5. This provisioning allows combatant commanders to position soldiers as required in their Area of Responsibility, within 24 to 48 hours.

The U.S. Army is beginning to use a more modern tent called the deployable rapid assembly shelter (DRASH). In 2008, DRASH became part of the Army's Standard Integrated Command Post System.

== See also ==
- America's Army (video games for recruitment)
- Army and Navy stamp issues of 1936–1937
- History of the United States Army
- List of military weapons of the United States
- Junior Reserve Officers' Training Corps
- List of active United States military aircraft
- List of comparative military ranks
- List of former United States Army medical units
- List of wars involving the United States
- Reorganization plan of United States Army
- Soldier's Creed
- Timeline of United States military operations
- U.S. Army Combat Arms Regimental System
- U.S. Army Regimental System
- United States Army Basic Training
- United States Constabulary (United States Gendarmerie)
