= List of military weapons of the United States =

This is a list of all military weapons ever used by the United States. This list will include all lists dealing with US weapons to show all weapons ever used by the United States of America.

== American Revolution ==
- List of infantry weapons in the American Revolution

== American Civil War ==
- List of weapons in the American Civil War

== Spanish-American War ==
- List of weapons of the Spanish–American War

== World War II ==
- List of equipment of the United States Army during World War II

== Cold war ==
=== Korean War ===
- List of Korean War weapons

=== Vietnam War ===
- Weapons of the Vietnam War

== Modern day ==
- List of equipment of the United States Army
- List of weapons of the United States Marine Corps

== See also ==
- List of wars involving the United States
