= Structure of the United States Army =

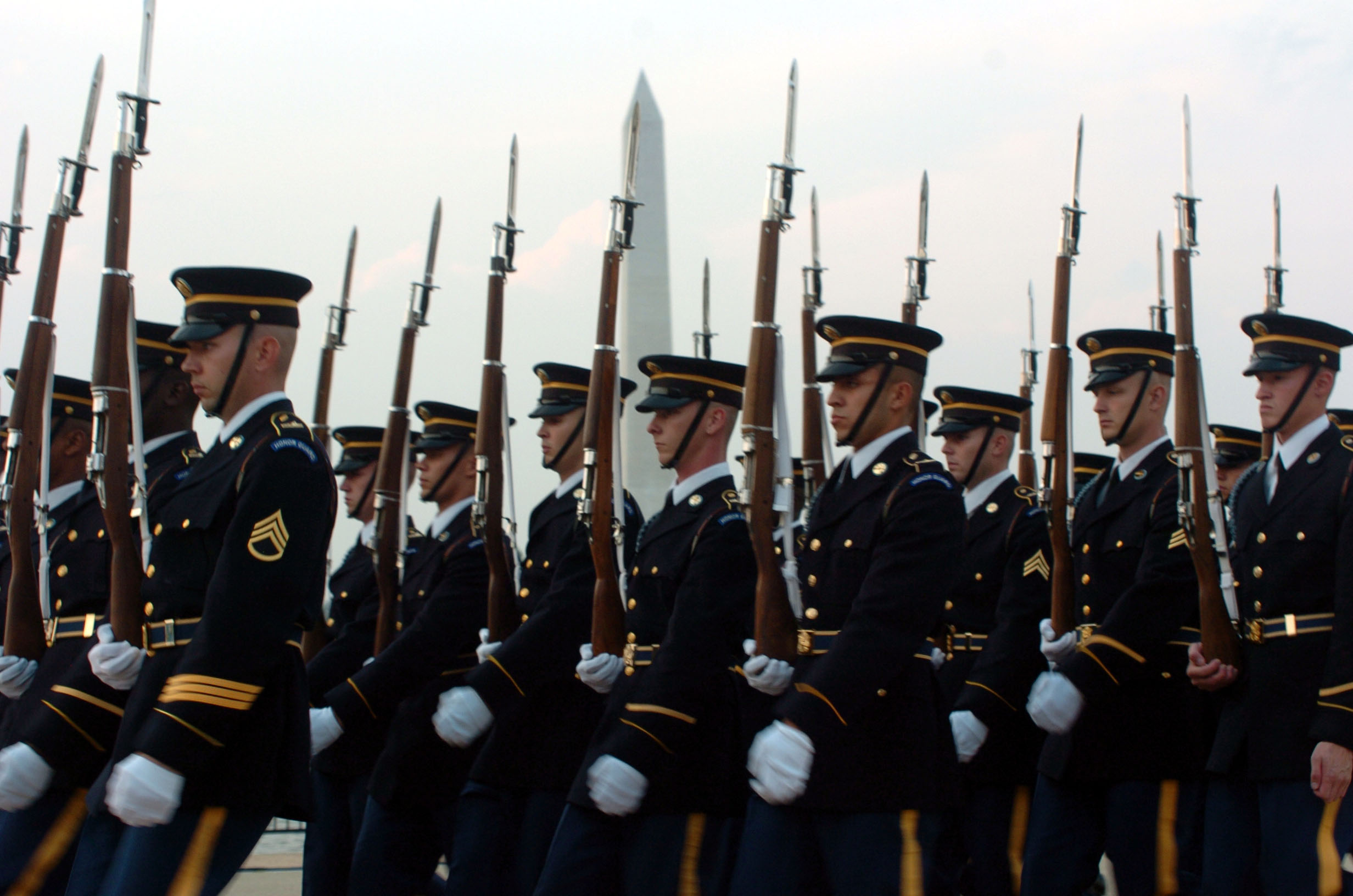
The United States Army Drill Team

The structure of the United States Army is complex, and can be interpreted in several different ways: active/reserve, operational/administrative, and branches/functional areas.

From time to time the Department of the Army issues Department of the Army General Orders. In addition to base closures, unit citations, certain awards such as the Medal of Honor and Legion of Merit, they may concern the creation of JROTC units and structural changes to the Army. These are listed by year on the Army Publishing Directorate's website.

== History ==
Prior to 1903, members of the National Guard were considered state soldiers unless federalized by the President. Since the Militia Act of 1903, all National Guard soldiers have held dual status: as National Guardsmen under the authority of the governors of their states and as a reserve of the U.S. Army under the authority of the President. Since the adoption of the total force policy, in the aftermath of the Vietnam War, reserve component soldiers have taken a more active role in U.S. military operations. Reserve and Guard units took part in the Gulf War, peacekeeping in Kosovo, and the 2003 invasion of Iraq. Although the present-day Army exists as an all-volunteer force, augmented by Reserve and National Guard forces, measures exist for emergency expansion in the event of a catastrophic occurrence, such as a large scale attack against the U.S. or the outbreak of a major global war.

The final stage of Army mobilization, known as "activation of the unorganized militia" would effectively place all able-bodied males in the service of the U.S. Army.

During World War I, the National Army was organized to fight the conflict. It was demobilized at the end of World War I.

After World War I, former units were replaced by the Regular Army, the Organized Reserve Corps, and the State Militias. In the 1920s and 1930s, the "career" soldiers were known as the "Regular Army" with the Enlisted Reserve Corps and Officer Reserve Corps augmented to fill vacancies when needed.

In 1941, the Army of the United States was founded to fight World War II. The Regular Army, Army of the United States, the National Guard, and Officer/Enlisted Reserve Corps (ORC and ERC) existed simultaneously.

=== Post World War II ===
After World War II, the ORC and ERC were combined into the United States Army Reserve. The Army of the United States was re-established for the Korean War and Vietnam War and was demobilized upon the suspension of the Draft.

== Active and reserve components ==
The United States Army is made up of three components: one active—the Regular Army; and two reserve components—the Army National Guard and the Army Reserve. Both reserve components are primarily composed of part-time soldiers who train once a month, known as Battle Assembly, Unit Training Assemblies (UTAs), or simply "drills", while typically conducting two to three weeks of annual training each year. Both the Regular Army and the Army Reserve are organized under Title 10 of the United States Code. The National Guard is organized under Title 32. While the Army National Guard is organized, trained, and equipped as a component of the U.S. Army, individual units are under the command of individual states' governors. However, units of the National Guard can be federalized by presidential order and against the governor's wishes.

== Administrative ==
=== Headquarters Department of the Army (HQ DA) Staff ===
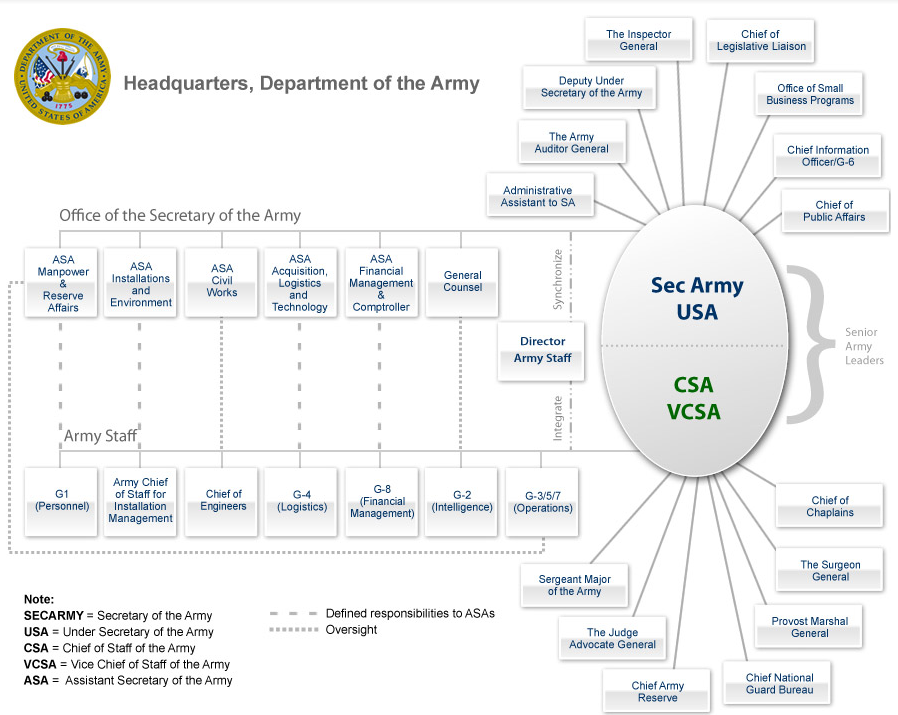
Chart summarizing the organization of the Department of the Army's Headquarters as of 2010.

The U.S. Army is led by a civilian Secretary of the Army, who reports to the Secretary of Defense, and serves as civilian oversight for the Chief of Staff of the United States Army (CSA). The CSA is assisted by the Vice Chief of Staff of the United States Army. The CSA is a member of the Joint Chiefs of Staff, a body composed of the service chiefs from each service who advise the President of the United States and secretary of defense on military matters under the guidance of the chairman and vice chairman of the Joint Chiefs of Staff.

=== Field Operating Agencies ===
- Assistant Secretary of the Army for Manpower and Reserve Affairs
  - Army Equity and Inclusion Agency
  - Army Review Boards Agency
  - United States Army Manpower Analysis Agency
- Administrative Assistant to the Secretary of the Army
  - United States Army Headquarters Support Agency
- Army Auditor General
  - United States Army Audit Agency
- Chief Information Officer
  - Enterprise Cloud Management Agency
  - United States Army Enterprise Services Agency
- Chief of Public Affairs
  - Army Public Affairs Center
- Deputy Chief of Staff for Personnel (G-1)
  - Civilian Training Student Education Detachment
  - Army Enterprise Marketing Office
- Deputy Chief of Staff for Operations, Plans and Training (G-3/5/7)
  - United States Army Aeronautical Services Agency
  - United States Army Command and Control Support Agency (a staff support agency)
  - United States Army Force Management Support Agency
  - United States Army Nuclear and Countering Weapons of Mass Destruction Agency
- Deputy Chief of Staff for Logistics (G-4)
  - United States Army Logistics Enterprise Support Agency
- Deputy Chief of Staff for Programs (G-8)
  - Center for Army Analysis
- Director of the Army Staff
  - United States Army Combat Readiness Center
- United States Army Provost Marshal General
  - Defense Forensics and Biometrics Agency
- The Inspector General of the Army
  - United States Army Inspector General Agency
- The Judge Advocate General of the Army
  - The Judge Advocate General's Legal Center and School
  - United States Army Legal Services Agency

=== Office of the Inspector General ===
The Inspector General of the Army (IG) maintains open channels of communication for extraordinary issues which might lie outside the purview of the chain of command; it lists points of contact for the 3 Army Commands (ACOMs), the 11 Army Service Component Commands (ASCCs), and 12 Direct Reporting Units (DRUs). IG teams might then be assigned to a case, if need be, to perform inspections, assessments, and investigations.

- Inspector General's Corps

== Army Commands, and Army Service Component Commands ==
Army Commands (ACOMs) and Army Service Component Commands (ASCCs) serve different purposes. The ACOMs are: Materiel Command and Transformation and Training Command.

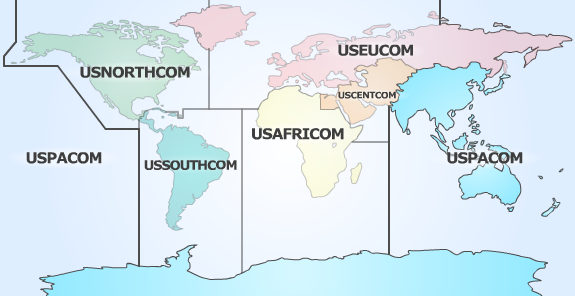
Map showing the six geographical commands of the U.S. Department of Defense prior to 2018.

Some of the Army Service Component Commands (ASCCs) are components of the six geographical Unified Combatant Commands (CCMDs). Other ASCCs serve the functional CCMDs.

- United States Army Central headquartered at Shaw Air Force Base, South Carolina
- United States Army North headquartered at Fort Sam Houston, Texas
- United States Army South headquartered at Fort Sam Houston, Texas
- United States Army Europe headquartered at Lucius D. Clay Kaserne, Wiesbaden, Germany
- United States Army Africa headquartered at Caserma Ederle, Vicenza, Italy
- United States Army Pacific headquartered at Fort Shafter, Hawaii.

Army Cyber Command is a component of United States Cyber Command. The commander of Army Cyber used to serve as commander of Second Army. Up until 2017, Second Army was a direct reporting unit to the Army CIO/G-6, with the CIO reporting to the Secretary of the Army, while the G-6 reports to the Army Chief of Staff. A 2017 reorganization eliminated the need for Second Army's network operations coordinating function, and the headquarters was deactivated on 31 March 2017. Army Network Enterprise Technology Command formerly reporting directly to the CIO/G-6, was a component of Second Army. The numerical designation 9th Army Signal Command has now been removed from NETCOM.

In addition, the Army's Special Operations Command administers its Joint Operations units; Space and Missile Defense Command provides global satellite-related infrastructure, and missile defense for the combatant commands, and for the nation. Surface Deployment and Distribution Command provides transport.

Headquarters, United States Department of the Army (HQDA):

Army Commands	Current commander	Location of headquarters
United States Army Transformation and Training Command (T2COM)	GEN David M. Hodne	Austin, Texas
United States Army Materiel Command (AMC)	LTG Christopher O. Mohan	Redstone Arsenal, Alabama
Army Service Component Commands	Current commander	Location of headquarters
United States Army Western Hemisphere Command (USAWHC)	GEN Joseph A. Ryan	Fort Bragg, North Carolina
United States Army Europe and Africa(USAREUR-AF)/Seventh Army	MG Christopher Norrie (acting)	Clay Kaserne, Wiesbaden, Germany
United States Army Pacific (USARPAC)	GEN Ronald P. Clark	Fort Shafter, Hawaii
United States Army Central (ARCENT)/Third Army	LTG Kevin C. Leahy	Shaw Air Force Base, South Carolina
United States Army Cyber Command (ARCYBER)	LTG Maria B. Barrett	Fort Gordon, Georgia
United States Army Space and Missile Defense Command/United States Army Forces Strategic Command (USASMDC/ARSTRAT)	LTG Sean Gainey	Redstone Arsenal, Alabama
United States Army Special Operations Command (USASOC)	LTG Lawrence G. Ferguson	Fort Bragg, North Carolina
United States Army Transportation Command (ARTRANS)	MG Lance G. Curtis	Scott AFB, Illinois
Operational Force Headquarters	Current commander	Location of headquarters
Eighth Army (EUSA)	LTG Joseph E. Hilbert	Camp Humphreys, South Korea
Direct reporting units	Current commander	Location of headquarters
Arlington National Cemetery and Soldiers' and Airmen's Home National Cemetery	Katharine Kelley (civilian)	Arlington County, Virginia
Joint Counter-Small Unmanned Aircraft Systems Office	MG David F. Stewart	Arlington County, Virginia
Military Postal Service Agency	BG Gregory S. Johnson	Arlington County, Virginia
United States Army Acquisition Support Center (USAASC)	Craig A. Spisak (civilian)	Fort Belvoir, Virginia
United States Army Audit Agency (USAAA)	Bruce B. Miller	Alexandria, Virginia
United States Army Civilian Human Resources Agency (CHRA)	Carol Burton (civilian)	Aberdeen Proving Ground, Maryland
United States Army Corps of Engineers (USACE)	LTG William H. Graham Jr.	Washington, D.C.
United States Army Corrections Command (ACC)	BG Sarah K. Albrycht	Arlington County, Virginia
United States Army Criminal Investigation Division (USACID)	Gregory D. Ford	Quantico, Virginia
United States Army Human Resources Command (HRC)	MG Hope C. Rampy	Fort Knox, Kentucky
United States Army Intelligence and Security Command (INSCOM)	MG Timothy D. Brown	Fort Belvoir, Virginia
United States Army Medical Command (MEDCOM)	LTG Mary K. Izaguirre	Joint Base San Antonio, Texas
United States Army Reserve Command (USARC)	LTG Robert Harter	Fort Bragg, North Carolina
United States Army Military District of Washington (MDW)	MG Antoinette R. Gant	Fort Lesley J. McNair, Washington, D.C.
United States Military Academy (USMA)	LTG James B. Bartholomees III	West Point, New York
Source: U.S. Army organization

== Operational unit structure ==
Most U.S. Army units can be operationally divided into the following components from largest to smallest:

- Field army: Formerly consisted of an army headquarters battalion, two corps, army troops (including army field artillery and army air defense artillery groups and brigades, an armored cavalry regiment, army aviation, military intelligence, combat engineer, and signal groups, and brigades), and a field army support command (FASCOM) consisting of military police, medical, and support (i.e., maintenance, quartermaster, and services) brigades, and transportation and ordnance groups. Now primarily an administrative arrangement, consisting of multiple corps. The last time a multiple-corps army took the field was Third Army directing VII and XVIII Corps during Operation Desert Storm. Armies now also operate as army service component commands (ASCCs) of unified combatant commands, such as Seventh Army/USAREUR. Armies have also effectively operated as military districts formerly in the continental United States. Fifth Army and First Army performed this function up until recently. Usually commanded by a general or lieutenant general.
- Corps: Formerly consisted of a corps headquarters and two or more divisions, corps troops (consisting of corps artillery, an armored cavalry regiment, an air defense artillery group, and an army aviation group), an expeditionary sustainment command (ESC) and other organic support brigades. A corps is now designated as an "operational unit of employment", that may command a flexible number of modular units. Usually commanded by a lieutenant general. 20,000–45,000 soldiers.
- Division: Formerly consisted of a division headquarters company, three maneuver brigades, division artillery (DIVARTY), sustainment brigade, an aviation brigade, an air defense artillery battalion, an armored cavalry squadron, and an engineer brigade, and other support assets. Until the brigade combat team program was developed, the division was the smallest self-sufficient level of organization in the U.S. Army. Current divisions are "tactical units of employment", and may command a flexible number of modular units, but generally will include three brigade combat teams and a combat aviation brigade, supported by a staff in a headquarters and headquarters battalion. Usually commanded by a major general who is supported by a command sergeant major. Typically consists of 17,000–21,000 soldiers but can grow up to 35,000–40,000 with attached support units.
- Brigade (or group): Composed of three battalions, with a brigadier general or a colonel as commander, supported by a staff in a headquarters and headquarters company. Maneuver brigades have transformed into brigade combat teams, generally consisting of three maneuver battalions, a cavalry squadron, a fires battalion, a special troops battalion (with engineers, signals, and military intelligence), and a command sergeant major and a support battalion. Stryker brigade combat teams have a somewhat larger structure. 3,000–5,000 soldiers.
- Regiment: The Army, for the most part is no longer organized by regiments. Rather, battalions and squadrons maintain regimental affiliations in that they are called (for example), 1st Battalion, 8th Infantry (Regiment is implied) and is written 1–8 Inf. In this case, there is no regimental commander, and the battalion is organized as part of a brigade for combat. The exceptions are those units, such as armored cavalry regiments which remain organized, and fight, as a regiment and have a regimental commander. The written designation is easy to distinguish and commonly misused. A "forward slash" ("/") separates levels of command. 1st Squadron, 3rd Armored Cavalry Regiment is written 1/3 ACR whereas the 1st Battalion, 6th Field Artillery (again, Regiment is implied) is written 1–6 FA.
- Battalion (or cavalry squadron): Normally composed of three companies, troops or batteries and led by a battalion/squadron commander, usually a lieutenant colonel supported by a command sergeant major and a staff in a headquarters and headquarters company/battery/troop. 300–1,000 soldiers.
- Company (or artillery battery/cavalry troop): Designated A to C (plus HQ or support companies/batteries/troops) when in a 3 company/battery battalion or A to D when organized in a 4 company/battery battalion. Regimental troops are designated A to T, depending on the number of troops. The troops are then divided into their like squadrons. Each company/battery/troop is composed of a company/battery/troop headquarters and three platoons, and led by a company/battery/troop commander, usually a first lieutenant, captain or sometimes a major supported by a first sergeant. 62–190 soldiers.
- Platoon: Composed of a platoon headquarters and three squads, led by a platoon leader, usually a second lieutenant supported by a platoon sergeant (sergeant first class). 42 soldiers.
- Section: Usually directed by a sergeant supported by one or two corporals who supplies guidance for junior NCO squad leaders. Often used in conjunction with platoons at the company level. 12–24 soldiers.
- Squad: Composed of two teams and is typically led by a staff sergeant or sergeant. 9 soldiers.
- Team: The smallest unit. A fire team consists of a team leader (usually a sergeant or corporal), a rifleman, a grenadier, and an automatic rifleman. A sniper team consists of a sniper who engages the enemy and a spotter who assists in targeting, team defense, and security. 4 soldiers.

== Major Operational Units ==
=== Armies ===
- First United States Army, US Army Western Hemisphere Command
- Third United States Army, US Army Central
- Fifth United States Army, US Army Western Hemisphere Command
- Sixth United States Army, US Army Western Hemisphere Command
- Seventh United States Army, US Army Europe
- Eighth United States Army, US Army Korea
- Ninth United States Army, US Army Africa

=== Corps ===
- I Corps headquartered at Fort Lewis, Washington
- III Corps headquartered at Fort Hood, Texas
- V Corps headquartered at Fort Knox, Kentucky and in Poznań, Poland
- XVIII Airborne Corps headquartered at Fort Bragg, North Carolina

=== Divisions ===
Regular Army Divisions

- 1st Armored Division
- 1st Cavalry Division
- 1st Infantry Division
- 2nd Infantry Division
- 3rd Infantry Division
- 4th Infantry Division
- 7th Infantry Division (TDA)
- 10th Mountain Division
- 11th Airborne Division
- 25th Infantry Division
- 82nd Airborne Division
- 101st Airborne Division (Air Assault)

Army National Guard Divisions

- 28th Infantry Division
- 29th Infantry Division
- 34th Infantry Division
- 35th Infantry Division
- 36th Infantry Division
- 38th Infantry Division
- 40th Infantry Division
- 42nd Infantry Division

=== Separate brigades/regiments ===
- 2nd Cavalry Regiment (Stryker brigade combat team) at Vilseck, Germany
- 3rd Cavalry Regiment (Stryker brigade combat team) at Fort Hood, Texas
- 11th Armored Cavalry Regiment (multi-compo heavy brigade combat team) at Fort Irwin, California (Not in total below due to its non-deployable role as permanent OPFOR at NTC)
- 75th Ranger Regiment (special operations airborne light infantry) HQ at Fort Benning, Georgia
- 173rd Airborne Brigade Combat Team (infantry brigade combat team (airborne) at Vicenza, Italy
- 3rd U.S. Infantry Regiment (The Old Guard) at Fort Myer and Fort McNair, Virginia

US Army Combat Brigades after the current round of deactivations / re-organizations: 31

- 11 Armored Brigade Combat Teams
- 6 Stryker Brigade Combat Teams
- 6 Infantry Brigade Combat Teams (light)
- 5 Infantry Brigade Combat Teams (airborne)
- 3 Infantry Brigade Combat Teams (air assault)

Recently the US Army has reorganized several BCTs, which would bring the totals to 11 ABCTs, 6 SBCTs, and 14 IBCTs.

=== Smaller units ===
Combat formations of the US Army at below brigade level include the United States Army Special Forces groups and several reserve separate battalions (100–442 Inf (USAR), 3-172 Inf (Mtn) (Vermont Army National Guard) etc.).

== Branches and functional areas ==
Personnel in the Army work in various branches, which is their area of training or expertise. Traditionally, the branches were divided into three groups combat arms, combat support, and combat service support. Currently, the Army classifies its branches as maneuver, fires, and effects; operations support; and force sustainment.

Basic branches - contain groupings of military occupational specialties (MOS) in various functional categories, groups, and areas of the army in which officers are commissioned or appointed (in the case of warrant officers) and indicate an officer's broad specialty area. (For example, Infantry, Signal Corps, and Adjutant General's Corps.) Generally, officers are assigned to sequential positions of increasing responsibility and authority within one of the three functional categories of the army branches (Maneuver, Fires and Effects; Operations Support; Force Sustainment) to develop their leadership and managerial skills to prepare them for higher levels of command. The branches themselves are administrative vice operational command structures that are primarily involved with training, doctrine, and manpower concerns. Each branch has a Branch Chief who is the Head of the Branch and usually serves as the respective branch school commandant or director.

Special branches - contain those groupings of military occupational specialties (MOS) of the army in which officers are commissioned or appointed after completing advanced training and education and/or receiving professional certification in one of the classic professions (i.e., theology, law, or medicine), or other associated health care areas (e.g., dentistry, veterinary medicine, pharmacy, registered nurse, physician's assistant). Officers of most special branches are restricted to command of units and activities of their respective department/branch only, regardless of rank or seniority. This means, for example, that Army Medical Department (AMEDD) branch officers may only command AMEDD units and activities. Likewise, Chaplains are essentially "officers without command" and are ineligible to command operational units and activities. They do, however, supervise junior ranking chaplains and enlisted chaplain's assistants. As an exception to this general rule, JAG Corps officers are eligible to command and may be assigned (with permission from the Judge Advocate General) to non-legal command positions, although ordinarily, like other Special branch officers, a JAG officer will only lead JAG Corps units and activities during their career.

Basic branches and date established

- Infantry, 14 June 1775
- Adjutant General's Corps, 16 June 1775
- Corps of Engineers, 16 June 1775
- Finance Corps, 16 June 1775
- Quartermaster Corps, 16 June 1775
- Field Artillery, 17 November 1775
- Armor, July 19, 1940
- Ordnance Corps, 14 May 1812
- Signal Corps, 21 June 1860
- Chemical Corps, 28 June 1918
- Military Police Corps, 26 September 1941
- Transportation Corps, 31 July 1942
- Military Intelligence Corps, 1 July 1962
- Air Defense Artillery, 20 June 1968
- Aviation, 12 April 1983
- Special Forces, 9 April 1987
- Acquisition Corps, 1 October 2002
- Civil Affairs Corps, 17 August 1955 (special branch); 16 October 2006 (basic branch)
- Psychological Operations, 16 October 2006
- Logistics, 1 January 2008
- Cyber Corps (As of 2014)

Special branches and date established

- Army Medical Department, 27 July 1775:
  - Medical Corps, 27 July 1775
  - Nurse Corps, 2 February 1901
  - Dental Corps, 3 March 1911
  - Veterinary Corps, 3 June 1916
  - Army Medical Specialist Corps, 16 April 1947
  - Medical Service Corps, 30 June 1917
- Chaplain Corps, 29 July 1775
- Judge Advocate General's Corps, 29 July 1775

Special assignment "branches" insignia

- Aides-de-Camp, 16 June 1775 (2nd Continental Congress authorized three military aides for the Commander in Chief) - officers only
- Army Bands, 14 June 1775 (2nd Continental Congress authorized a musician in each Continental Army infantry company) - enlisted only (officers wear Adjutant General's Corps branch insignia)
- Chaplain Candidates Corps, 18 June 2012 - officers only
- Chaplain Assistant 28 December 1909 - enlisted only
- General Staff Corps, 16 June 1775 (2nd Continental Congress authorized a general staff for the Continental Army) - officers only
- Inspector General's Corps, 13 December 1777 (2nd Continental Congress appointed Major General Thomas Conway as first Inspector General of the Continental Army)
- National Guard Bureau, 3 June 1916
- Senior Enlisted Leader, 1 July 1975 - worn by command sergeants major and sergeants major when in a position rated by a general officer or senior executive service level civilian
- Sergeant Major of the Army, 4 July 1966
- Senior Enlisted Advisor to the Chairman of the Joint Chiefs of Staff, 20 December 2005
- Staff Specialist Corps, 1 November 1941 - officers only

Each branch of the army has a different branch insignia. Per US Army Pamphlet 600-3, dated 1 February 2010, the three functional categories and associated functional groups for the branches and associated functional areas are:

=== Operations Division (OD) Branches and Functional Areas ===
==== Maneuver ====
- Infantry, 14 June 1775

Ten companies of riflemen were authorized by a resolution of the Continental Congress on 14 June 1775. However, the oldest Regular Army infantry regiment, the 3rd Infantry Regiment, was constituted on 3 June 1784, as the First American Regiment.

- Armor, 12 December 1776

The Armor Branch traces its origin to the Cavalry.

A regiment of cavalry was authorized to be raised by the Continental Congress Resolve of 12 December 1776. Although mounted units were raised at various times after the Revolution, the first in continuous service was the United States Regiment of Dragoons, organized in 1833. The Tank Corps was formed on 5 March 1918. The Armored Force was formed on 10 July 1940. Armor became a permanent branch of the army in 1950.

- Aviation, 12 April 1983

Following the establishment of the U.S. Air Force as a separate service in 1947, the army began to develop further its own aviation assets (light planes and rotary wing aircraft) in support of ground operations. The Korean War gave this drive impetus, and the war in Vietnam saw its fruition, as army aviation units performed a variety of missions, including reconnaissance, transport, and fire support. After the war in Vietnam, the role of armed helicopters as tank destroyers received new emphasis. In recognition of the growing importance of aviation in army doctrine and operations, aviation became a separate branch on 12 April 1983.

- Cyber Corps, 1 September 2014 (previously Signal Corps Information Systems Management)

==== Fires ====
- Field Artillery, 17 November 1775

The Continental Congress unanimously elected Henry Knox "Colonel of the Regiment of Artillery" on 17 November 1775. The regiment formally entered service on 1 January 1776.

- Air Defense Artillery, 20 June 1968

The Air Defense Artillery branch descended from the Anti-Aircraft Artillery (part of the U.S. Army Coast Artillery Corps) into a separate branch on 20 June 1968.

==== Maneuver Support ====
- Corps of Engineers, 16 June 1775

Continental Congress authority for a "Chief Engineer for the Army" dates from 16 June 1775. A corps of engineers for the United States was authorized by the Congress on 11 March 1789. The Corps of Engineers as it is known today came into being on 16 March 1802, when the President was authorized to "organize and establish a Corps of Engineers ... that the said Corps ... shall be stationed at West Point in the State of New York and shall constitute a Military Academy." A Corps of Topographical Engineers, authorized on 4 July 1838, was merged with the Corps of Engineers in March 1863.

- Chemical Corps, 28 June 1918

The Chemical Warfare Service was established on 28 June 1918, combining activities that until then had been dispersed among five separate agencies of government. It was made a permanent branch of the Regular Army by the National Defense Act of 1920. In 1945, it was re-designated the Chemical Corps.

- Military Police Corps, 26 September 1941

A Provost Marshal General's Office and Corps of Military Police were established in 1941. Prior to that time, except during the Civil War and World War I, there was no regularly appointed Provost Marshal General or regularly constituted Military Police Corps, although a "Provost Marshal" can be found as early as January 1776, and a "Provost Corps" as early as 1778.

==== Special Operations Forces ====
- Special Forces, 9 April 1987

The first special forces unit in the Army was formed on 11 June 1952, when the 10th Special Forces Group was activated at Fort Bragg, North Carolina. A major expansion of special forces occurred during the 1960s, with a total of eighteen groups organized in the Regular Army, Army Reserve, and Army National Guard. As a result of renewed emphasis on special operations in the 1980s, the Special Forces Branch was established as a basic branch of the army effective 9 April 1987, by General Order No. 35, 19 June 1987. Special forces are part of U.S. special operations forces

- Psychological Operations, 16 October 2006

Established as a basic branch effective 16 October 2006 per General Order 30, 12 January 2007.

- Civil Affairs Corps, 16 October 2006

The Civil Affairs/Military Government Branch in the Army Reserve Branch was established as a special branch on 17 August 1955. It was subsequently redesignated the Civil Affairs Branch on 2 October 1955, and it has continued its mission to provide guidance to commanders in a broad spectrum of activities ranging from host–guest relationships to the assumption of executive, legislative, and judicial processes in occupied or liberated areas. Became a basic branch effective 16 October 2006 per General Order 29, on 12 January 2007.

==== Effects ====
- Public Affairs
- Information Operations

=== Operations Support Division (OSD) Branches and Functional Areas ===
==== Network and Space Operations ====
- Signal Corps, 21 June 1860

The Signal Corps was authorized as a separate branch of the army by act of Congress on 3 March 1863. However, the Signal Corps dates its existence from 21 June 1860, when Congress authorized the appointment of one signal officer in the army, and a War Department order carried the following assignment: "Signal Department – Assistant Surgeon Albert J. Myer to be Signal Officer, with the rank of Major, 27 June 1860, to fill an original vacancy."

- Information Systems Management
- Telecommunication Systems Engineer
- Space Operations

==== Intelligence, Surveillance, and Reconnaissance (ISR) & Area Expertise ====
- Military Intelligence Corps, 1 July 1962

Intelligence has been an essential element of army operations during war as well as during periods of peace. In the past, requirements were met by personnel from the Army Intelligence and Army Security Reserve branches, two-year obligated tour officers, one-tour levies on the various branches, and Regular Army officers in the specialization programs. To meet the army's increased requirement for national and tactical intelligence, an Intelligence and Security Branch was established effective 1 July 1962, by General Order No. 38, on 3 July 1962. On 1 July 1967, the branch was re-designated as Military Intelligence.

- Strategic Intelligence
- Foreign Area Officer (FAO)

==== Plans Development ====
- Strategist
- Nuclear and Counterproliferation

==== Forces Development ====
- Force Management
- Operations Research/Systems Analysis (ORSA)
- Simulation Operations

==== Education and Training ====
- Permanent Academy Professor

=== Force Sustainment Division (FSD) Branches and Functional Areas ===
==== Integrated Logistics Corps ====
- Quartermaster Corps, 16 June 1775

The Quartermaster Corps, originally designated the Quartermaster Department, was established on 16 June 1775. While numerous additions, deletions, and changes of function have occurred, its basic supply and service support functions have continued in existence.

- Ordnance Corps, 14 May 1812

The Ordnance Department was established by act of Congress on 14 May 1812. During the Revolutionary War, ordnance material was under supervision of the Board of War and Ordnance. Numerous shifts in duties and responsibilities have occurred in the Ordnance Corps since colonial times. It acquired its present designation in 1950. Ordnance soldiers and officers provide maintenance and ammunition support.

- Transportation Corps, 31 July 1942

The history of the Transportation Corps starts with World War I. Prior to that time, transportation operations were chiefly the responsibility of the Quartermaster General. The Transportation Corps, essentially in its present form, was organized on 31 July 1942. The Transportation Corps is headquartered at Fort Lee, Virginia.

- Logistics Corps, 1 January 2008

Established by General Order 6, 27 November 2007. Consists of multifunctional logistics officers in the rank of captain and above, drawn from the Ordnance, Quartermaster and Transportation Corps.

==== Soldier Support ====
- Human Resources - Adjutant General's Corps, 16 June 1775

The post of Adjutant General was established 16 June 1775, and has been continuously in operation since that time. The Adjutant General's Department, by that name, was established by the act of 3 March 1812, and was re-designated the Adjutant General's Corps in 1950.

- Financial Management - Finance Corps, 16 June 1775

The Finance Corps is the successor to the old Pay Department, which was created in June 1775. The Finance Department was created by law on 1 July 1920. It became the Finance Corps in 1950.

==== Acquisition Corps ====
- Acquisition Corps (Note: Acquisition Corps works with U.S. ARMY ACQUISITION SUPPORT CENTER (USAASC), FORT BELVOIR, VIRGINIA)

==== Special Branches ====
- Army Medical Department (AMEDD), 27 July 1775

The Army Medical Department and the Medical Corps trace their origins to 27 July 1775, when the Continental Congress established the army hospital headed by a "Director General and Chief Physician." Congress provided a medical organization of the army only in time of war or emergency until 1818, which marked the inception of a permanent and continuous Medical Department. The Army Organization Act of 1950 renamed the Medical Department as the Army Medical Service. In June 1968, the Army Medical Service was re-designated the Army Medical Department. The Medical Department has the following branches:

- Medical Corps, 27 July 1775
- Army Nurse Corps, 2 February 1901
- Dental Corps, 3 March 1911
- Veterinary Corps, 3 June 1916
- Medical Service Corps, 30 June 1917
- Army Medical Specialist Corps, 16 April 1947

- Chaplain Corps, 29 July 1775

The legal origin of the Chaplain Corps is found in a resolution of the Continental Congress, adopted 29 July 1775, which made provision for the pay of chaplains. The Office of the Chief of Chaplains was created by the National Defense Act of 1920.

- Judge Advocate General's Corps, 29 July 1775

The Office of Judge Advocate General of the Army is deemed to have been created on 29 July 1775, the date of appointment of Colonel William Tudor as the first U.S. Army Judge Advocate General. The history of the branch has generally paralleled the origin and development of the American system of military justice. The Judge Advocate General Department, by that name, was established in 1884. Its present designation as a corps was enacted in 1948.

== See also ==
- Transformation of the United States Army
