= Internal Audit Service =

The Internal Audit Service is the title of several government bodies responsible for internal audit:

== Philippines ==
- At the Department of the Interior and Local Government
- At the Department of Health (Philippines)
- At the Department of Budget and Management
- At the Department of National Defense (Philippines)
- At the Department of Trade and Industry (Philippines)

== Elsewhere ==
- Internal Audit Service (European Commission)
- At the Ministry of Defence (Slovenia)
- The United States Army Audit Agency
- The South African Army Inspector-General

== See also ==
- Audit Commission (disambiguation), any of several national governments' internal audit bodies
- Auditor general
- Comptroller general (disambiguation)
