= Combat support =

Operational assistance to combat elements

In the United States Army, the term combat support refers to units that provide fire support and operational assistance to combat elements. Combat support units provide specialized support functions to combat units in the following areas:

- Chemical warfare
- Combat engineering
- Military intelligence
- Security
- Communications

Combat support should not be confused with combat service support. Combat support units are focused on providing operational support to combat units, while combat service support units are focused on providing logistical support to combat units. Actual combat units are collectively referred to as combat arms units; hence, all army units fall into the category of either combat arms, combat support, or combat service support.

== United States Army ==
Currently, U.S. Army organizational doctrine uses the classification "Maneuver, Fires and Effects" (MFE) and "Operations Support" (OS) to group the former combat support arms branches into Maneuver Support; Special Operations Forces; Network and Space Operations; and Intelligence, Surveillance, and Reconnaissance functional areas.

Within the U.S. Army, the traditional combat support branches are/were:

- Chemical Corps (Chemical Warfare Service 1918 / Chemical Corps 1945)
- Military Intelligence Corps (1962)
- United States Army Military Police Corps (1941)
- Signal Corps (1860)

Before the Army ceased using the combat arms / combat support arms / combat service support arms classification system in 2008, the following branches were classified as combat support arms from the year designated. (Note: Army Aviation and Engineers are in fact Combat Arms branches that include Combat Support and Combat Service Support roles.)

- Army Aviation (1983) See the Combat Arms – Army Aviation entry for a detailed explanation of the history, organization, and mission of Army Aviation in relation to combat arms / combat support arms classifications.
- Civil Affairs Corps (2006)
- Psychological Operations Corps (Military Information Support Operations) (2006)
- Corps of Engineers (1775) See the Combat Arms – Corps of Engineers entry for a detailed explanation of the history, organization, and mission of Engineers in relation to combat arms / combat support arms classifications.
Combat Support Branch Insignia
Branch insignia of the Chemical Corps

Branch insignia of the Military Intelligence Corps

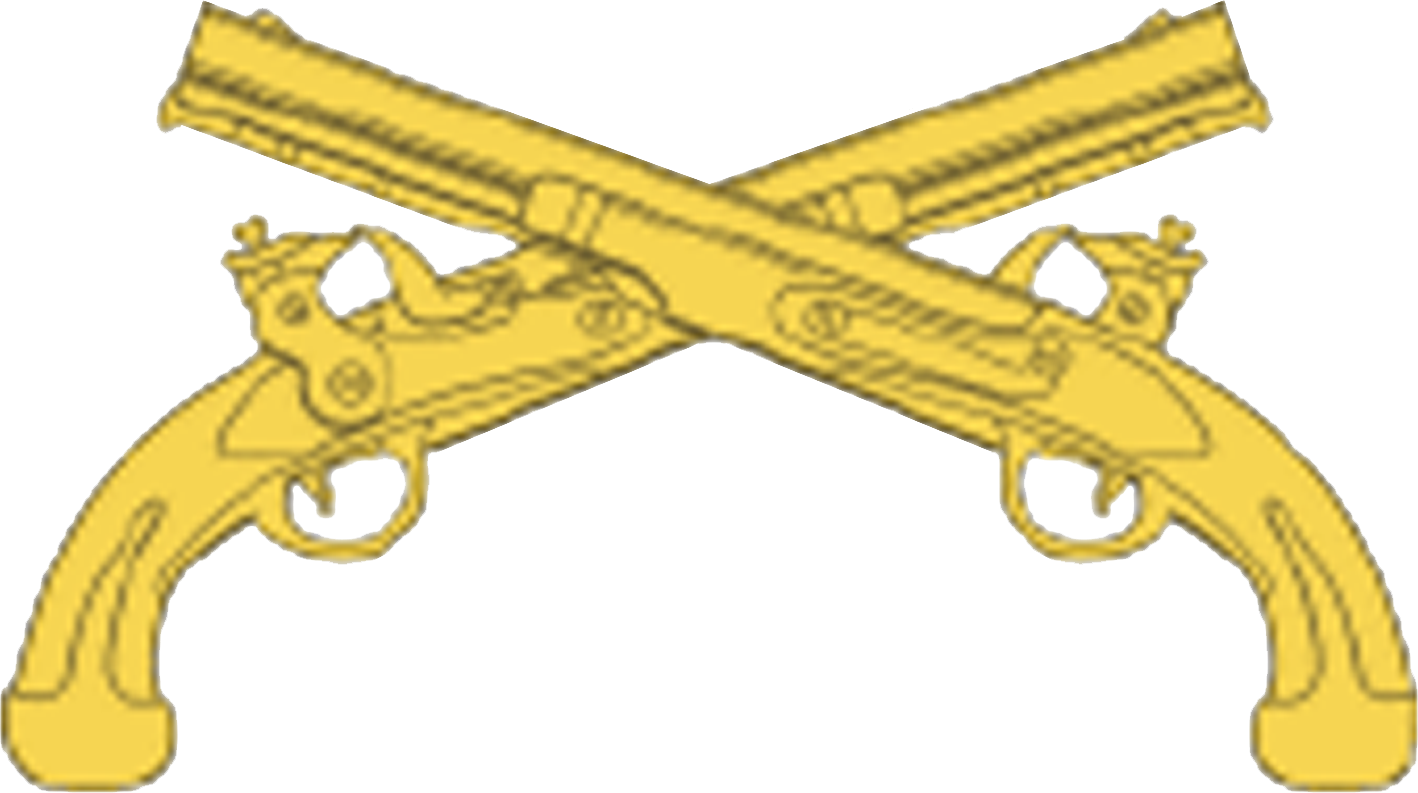
Branch insignia of the Military Police Corps

Branch insignia of the Signal Corps

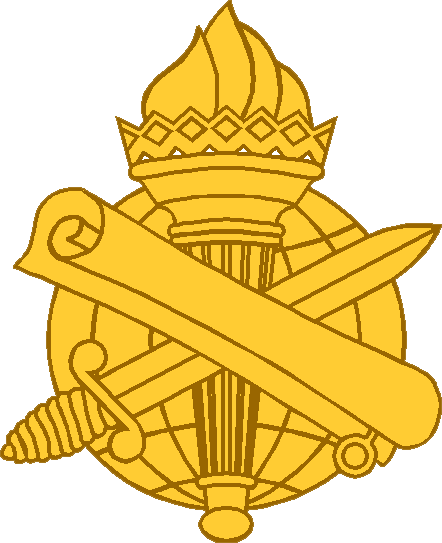
Branch insignia of the Civil Affairs Corps

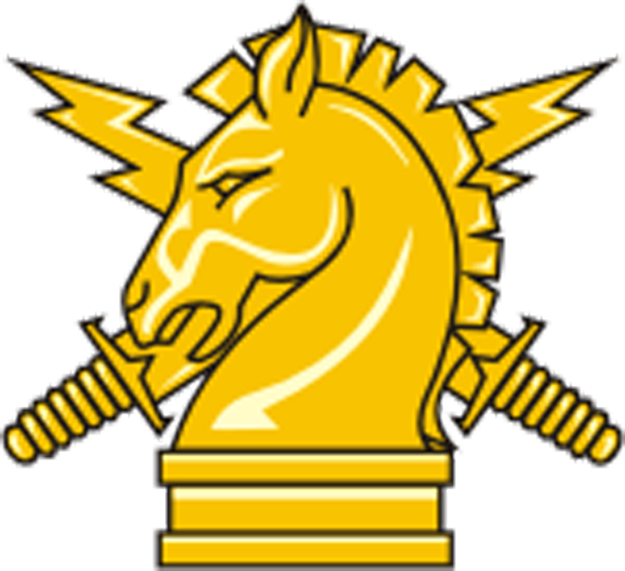
Branch insignia of the Psychological Operations Corps

== United States Marine Corps ==
United States Marine Corps doctrine designates all Ground Combat Element (GCE) forces, other than infantry, including field artillery, assault amphibian, combat engineer, light armored reconnaissance, reconnaissance, and tanks (prior to the USMC divestiture of all tanks by the end of 2021) as combat support. The primary mission of all USMC combat support units is to directly support the infantry.

The Marine Corps does not have a separate "Chemical Corps" but rather mans each GCE battalion with NBC specialist personnel (officer and enlisted) in the battalion operations section. The Marine Corps also maintains a battalion-sized Chemical Biological Incident Response Force (CBIRF) as an element of the II Marine Expeditionary Force (II MEF), responsible for fulfilling the mission of Chemical, Biological, Radiological, Nuclear, and High-Yield Explosive (CBRNE) consequence management.

USMC military intelligence (intelligence battalions), military police (law enforcement battalions), and signal (communications battalions), as well as radio battalions (signals intelligence and electronic warfare), air naval gunfire liaison, force reconnaissance, psychological operations, civil affairs, and public affairs units are designated as Command Element (CE) (C4ISTAREW) units and are classed separately from GCE combat support units.

All Marine Aviation aircraft squadrons and aviation support units (aviation headquarters, tactical air command, air control, air support, communications, aviation logistics, and aviation ground support squadrons, as well as low altitude air defense battalions) are organic to the Aviation Combat Element (ACE). In the Marine Corps, the Army Aviation combat support missions of battlefield reconnaissance, signals intelligence, and assault helicopter support are performed by the ACE through the Marine Aviation functions of aerial reconnaissance, electronic warfare, and assault support. (The remaining three functions of Marine Aviation are: offensive air support, antiair warfare, and control of aircraft and missiles.)

Combat Service Support (CSS), known in the Marine Corps as the Logistics Combat Element (LCE), is responsible for providing direct logistical support to GCE units and general logistical support throughout the MAGTF. Combat Logistics Battalions (CLBs) provide motor transport, supply distribution, and landing support (i.e., materiel handling) directly to dedicated GCE units, while Combat Logistics Companies (CLCs) provide direct logistical support to dedicated ACE units. (The ACE also contains two specialized types of CSS units, Marine Aviation Logistics Squadrons (MALS) and Marine Wing Support Squadrons (MWSS). The MALS provides direct intermediate aircraft maintenance, aviation supply, and aviation ordnance support to dedicated aircraft squadrons, while the MWSS provides airfield services to a dedicated Marine Aircraft Group (MAG)). Supply, maintenance, transportation support, engineer support, medical, and dental battalions provide general logistical support throughout the MAGTF.

== See also ==
- Branches of the U.S. Army
- Combat service support (United States)
- U.S. Army Combat Arms Regimental System
- U.S. Army Regimental System
