= Comptroller general (disambiguation) =

Comptroller general or comptroller-general or controller general may refer to:

- Comptroller General of the United States, director of the Government Accountability Office (GAO)
- the Office of the Comptroller General, which exerts internal audit over the Brazilian federal government
- Comptroller General of Convicts (Western Australia)
- Comptroller General of the Exchequer in the United Kingdom, who authorised the issue of public monies to departments from 1834 to 1866
- Comptroller and Auditor General of India

== See also ==
- State Comptroller (disambiguation)
- Controller (disambiguation)
- Comptroller
- Auditor general
- Director of Audit (disambiguation)
- Office of the Auditor General (disambiguation)
- National Audit Office (disambiguation)
- Audit Commission (disambiguation)
