= State Audit Office =

State Audit Office may refer to:

- State Audit Office of the Republic of Latvia
- State Audit Office (Thailand)
- State auditor (US states)

== See also ==
- National Audit Office (disambiguation)
- Category:Auditing organizations
