= United States Army Veterinary Corps =

Verterinary service of the US Army

Veterinary Corps
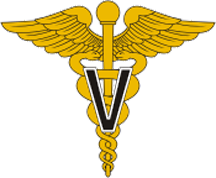
- Branch insignia
- Active: 1916 – present day
- Country: United States
- Branch: United States Army
- Website: Veterinary Corps

The US Army Veterinary Corps is a staff corps (non-combat specialty branch) of the US Army Medical Department (AMEDD) consisting of commissioned veterinary officers and Health Professions Scholarship Program (HPSP) veterinary students. It was established by an Act of Congress on 3 June 1916. Recognition of the need for veterinary expertise had been evolving since 1776 when General Washington directed that a "regiment of horse with a farrier" be raised. It has evolved to include sanitary food inspectors and animal healthcare specialists.

The Veterinary Corps is supported by warrant officer and enlisted AMEDD personnel. Warrant officers (640A) are the core of its Food Inspection service. Enlisted personnel can serve as Food Inspection Specialists (68R) and Animal Care Specialists (68T); enlisted collar insignia lacks the 'V' and is the same as that worn by medics. Enlisted Army Animal Care Specialists (68Ts) are not the same as credentialed veterinary technicians and technologists, because the civilian role is the equivalent of the UK's Registered Veterinary Nurse (RVN) and requires a formal license with an accredited 2, 4, or 6-year college degree.

The US Army Veterinary Service is currently composed of more than 700 veterinarians, 80 warrant officers, and 1800 enlisted soldiers in both the active duty and in the Army Reserves. The Chief of the Veterinary Corps is a Colonel. The Veterinary Service employs an additional 400 civilians.

== Mission ==
The US Army Veterinary Corps' mission is to protect the Warfighter and support the National Military Strategy. They accomplish this by providing veterinary public health capabilities through veterinary medical and surgical care, food safety and defense, and biomedical research and development. In addition, Veterinary Corps Officers provide military veterinary expertise in response to natural disasters and other emergencies. While the current mission statement does not include the performance of stability and reconstruction operations, Veterinary Corps personnel are involved in these missions.

The US Army Veterinary Corps provides food safety and security inspections for all of the Armed Services. They also are responsible for providing care to Military Working Dogs, ceremonial horses, working animals of many Department of Homeland Security organizations, and pets owned by service members. They also contribute their skills in the development of life saving medical products that protect all service members.

== Enlistment ==
- The Health Professions Scholarship Program (HPSP) allows qualified recipients to earn a full-tuition scholarship, plus a monthly allowance, to attend an accredited veterinarian school in the United States.
- Direct Commissioning is offered to all graduates of accredited schools of veterinary medicine in the United States who are US citizens. The maximum age is 42 at time of accession.
- Students commissioned through the Reserve Officer Training Corps (ROTC) may apply for an Educational Delay to attend veterinary school.

== Advanced degrees ==
Officers may apply for Long Term Health Education and Training programs leading to advanced degrees and board eligibility and certification. Programs run from 1–3 years and include training at either military or civilian institutions. Full pay and allowances continue during training. Residency programs include:

- Veterinary pathology
- Laboratory animal medicine
- Epidemiology Investigative Services (EIS) Fellowship at the Centers for Disease Control and Prevention (CDC)
- PhD in physiology, pharmacology, toxicology, microbiology, pathology, or public health.
- Master's Degree in internal medicine, surgery, radiology, food animal/preventive medicine, emergency medicine, public health, food technology, or human animal bond.

== Association of Retired Enlisted Veterinary Personnel ==
The Association of Retired Enlisted Veterinary Personnel (AREVP) was founded in 1989. Initially, members were Retired Army Enlisted Veterinary Personnel but later, any personnel, active or retired, from Army or Air Force, could be admitted, provided they had completed Veterinary Service Training in Animal Care or Food Inspection.
