= Military tactics =

Science and art of organizing a military force and techniques

Military tactics encompasses the art of organizing and employing fighting forces on or near the battlefield. They involve the application of four battlefield functions which are closely related – kinetic or firepower, mobility, protection or security, and shock action. Tactics are a separate function from command and control and logistics. In contemporary military science, tactics are the lowest of three levels of warfighting, the higher levels being the strategic and operational levels. Throughout history, there has been a shifting balance between the four tactical functions, generally based on the application of military technology, which has led to one or more of the tactical functions being dominant for a period of time, usually accompanied by the dominance of an associated fighting arm deployed on the battlefield, such as infantry, artillery, cavalry or tanks.

== Tactical functions ==
=== Firepower ===
Beginning with the use of melee and missile weapons such as clubs and spears, the firepower function of tactics has developed along with technological advances so that the emphasis has shifted from the close-range melee and missile weapons to longer-range projectile weapons. Effects were generally delivered by the sword, spear, javelin and bow until the introduction of artillery by the Romans. Until the mid 19th century, the value of infantry-delivered missile firepower was not high, meaning that the result of a battle was rarely decided by infantry firepower alone, often relying on artillery. The development of disciplined volley fire, delivered at close range, began to improve the hitting power of infantry, and compensated in part for the limited range, poor accuracy and low rate of fire of early muskets. Advances in technology, particularly the introduction of the rifled musket, used in the Crimean War and American Civil War, meant flatter trajectories and improved accuracy at greater ranges, along with higher casualties. The resulting increase in defensive firepower meant infantry attacks without artillery support became increasingly difficult. Firepower also became crucial to pinning an enemy down to allow a decisive attack. Machine guns added significantly to infantry firepower at the turn of the 20th century and the mobile firepower provided by tanks, self-propelled artillery and military aircraft rose significantly in the century that followed. Along with infantry weapons, tanks and other armoured vehicles, self-propelled artillery, guided weapons and aircraft provide the firepower of modern armies.

=== Mobility ===
Mobility, which determines how quickly a fighting force can move, was for most of human history limited by the speed of a soldier on foot, even when supplies were carried by beasts of burden. With this restriction, most armies could not travel more than 32 kilometres (20 mi) per day, unless travelling on rivers. Only small elements of a force such as cavalry or specially trained light troops could exceed this limit. This restriction on tactical mobility remained until the latter years of World War I when the advent of the tank improved mobility sufficiently to allow decisive tactical manoeuvre. Despite this advance, full tactical mobility was not achieved until World War II when armoured and motorised formations achieved remarkable successes. However, large elements of the armies of World War II remained reliant on horse-drawn transport, which limited tactical mobility within the overall force. Tactical mobility can be limited by the use of field obstacles, often created by military engineers.

=== Protection and security ===
Personal armour has been worn since the classical period to provide a measure of individual protection, which was also extended to include barding of the mount. The limitations of armour have always been weight and bulk, and its consequent effects on mobility as well as human and animal endurance. By the 18th and 19th centuries, personal armour had been largely discarded, until the re-introduction of helmets during World War I in response to the firepower of artillery. Armoured fighting vehicles proliferated during World War II, and after that war, body armour returned for the infantry, particularly in Western armies. Fortifications, which have been used since ancient times, provide collective protection, and modern examples include entrenchments, roadblocks, barbed wire and minefields. Like obstacles, fortifications are often created by military engineers.

=== Shock action ===
Shock action is as much a psychological function of tactics as a physical one, and can be significantly enhanced by the use of surprise. It has been provided by charging infantry, and as well as by chariots, war elephants, cavalry and armoured vehicles which provide momentum to an assault. It has also been used in a defensive way, for example by the drenching flights of arrows from English longbowmen at the Battle of Agincourt in 1415 which caused the horses of the French knights to panic. During early modern warfare, the use of the tactical formations of columns and lines had a greater effect than the firepower of the formations alone. During the early stages of World War II, the combined effects of German machine gun and tank gun firepower, enhanced by accurate indirect fire and air attack, often broke up Allied units before their assault commenced, or caused them to falter due to casualties among key unit leaders. In both the early modern and World War II examples, the cumulative psychological shock effect on the enemy was often greater than the actual casualties incurred.

== Development ==
The development of tactics has involved a shifting balance between the four tactical functions since ancient times, and changes in firepower and mobility have been fundamental to these changes. Various models have been proposed to explain the interaction between the tactical functions and the dominance of individual fighting arms during different periods. J. F. C. Fuller proposed three "tactical cycles" in each of the classical and Christian eras. For the latter epoch, he proposed a "shock" cycle between 650 and 1450, a "shock and projectile" cycle 1450–1850, and a "projectile" cycle from 1850, with respect to the Western and North American warfare. During World War II, Tom Wintringham proposed six chronological periods, which alternate the dominance between unarmoured and armoured forces and highlight tactical trends in each period.

Development of tactics
Period	Dominant fighting arm	Tactical trends
First unarmoured period (to the Battle of Plataea (479 BC))	None – both infantry and cavalry have relatively low kinetic power, chariots provide a measure of shock action	Egyptian, Persian and Greek armies become better organised and equipped
First armoured period (to the Battle of Adrianople (378)	Infantry – the phalanx and Roman legion, experimentation with elephants for shock action only a limited success	Armies and casualties increase significantly, introduction of siege and field artillery by the Romans
Second unarmoured period (to Charlemagne's victory at Pavia (774))	Light cavalry – horse archers and shock action defeat infantry	Mobility dominates until checked by armoured cavalry
Second armoured period (to the battles of Morgarten (1315), Crécy (1346) and Battle of Ravenna (1512))	Heavy cavalry – facilitated by the introduction of the stirrup and armour	Expense limits numbers of armoured cavalry, Swiss infantry armed with halberds and English longbowmen rebalance the scales
Third unarmoured period (to the Battle of Cambrai (1917))	Infantry – with steadily increasing firepower	Combined arms, with artillery firepower becoming predominant
Third armoured period (to the present)	Armoured forces restore mobility	Armoured combined arms countered by military aircraft and infantry anti-armour weapons

Massed volley fire by archers brought infantry firepower to the fore in Japanese warfare in the second half of the 13th century, preceding the rise of the English longbowman. The mobility and shock action of the Oirat Mongol army at the Battle of Tumu in 1449 demonstrated that cavalry could still defeat a large infantry force. In both the European and Oriental traditions of warfare, the advent of gunpowder during the late Medieval and early modern periods created a relentless shift to infantry firepower becoming "a decisive, if not dominant" arm on the battlefield, exemplified by the significant impact of massed arquebusiers at the Battle of Nagashino in 1575.

== Combined arms tactics ==
The synchronisation of the various fighting arms to achieve the tactical mission is known as combined arms tactics. One method of measuring tactical effectiveness is the extent to which the arms, including military aviation, are integrated on the battlefield. A key principle of effective combined arms tactics is that for maximum potential to be achieved, all elements of combined arms teams need the same level of mobility, and sufficient firepower and protection. The history of the development of combined arms tactics has been dogged by costly and painful lessons. For example, while German commanders in World War II clearly understood from the outset the key principle of combined arms tactics outlined above, British commanders were late to this realisation. Successful combined arms tactics require the fighting arms to train alongside each other and to be familiar with each other's capabilities.

== Impact of air power ==
Beginning in the latter stages of World War I, airpower has brought a significant change to military tactics. World War II saw the development of close air support which greatly enhanced the effect of ground forces with the use of aerial firepower and improved tactical reconnaissance and the interdiction of hostile air power. It also made possible the supply of ground forces by air, achieved by the British during the Burma Campaign but unsuccessful for the Germans at the Battle of Stalingrad. Following World War II, rotary-wing aircraft had a significant impact on firepower and mobility, comprising a fighting arm in its own right in many armies. Aircraft, particularly those operating at low or medium altitudes, remain vulnerable to ground-based air defence systems as well as other aircraft.

Parachute and glider operations and rotary-wing aircraft have provided significant mobility to ground forces but the reduced mobility, protection and firepower of troops delivered by air once landed has limited the tactical utility of such vertical envelopment or air assault operations. This was demonstrated during Operation Market Garden in September 1944, and during the Vietnam War, in the latter case despite the additional firepower provided by helicopter gunships and the ability quickly to remove casualties, provided by aeromedical evacuation.

== Concept ==
German World War I observation post disguised as a tree.

Military tactics answer the questions of how best to deploy and employ forces on a small scale. Some practices have not changed since the dawn of warfare: assault, ambushes, skirmishing, turning flanks, reconnaissance, creating and using obstacles and defenses, etc. Using ground to best advantage has not changed much either. Heights, rivers, swamps, passes, choke points, and natural cover, can all be used in multiple ways. Before the nineteenth century, many military tactics were confined to battlefield concerns: how to maneuver units during combat in open terrain. Nowadays, specialized tactics exist for many situations, for example for securing a room in a building.

Tactics define how soldiers are armed and trained. Thus technology and society influence the development of types of soldiers or warriors through history: Greek hoplite, Roman legionary, medieval knight, Turk-Mongol horse archer, Chinese crossbowman, or an air cavalry trooper. Each – constrained by his weaponry, logistics and social conditioning – would use a battlefield differently, but would usually seek the same outcomes from their use of tactics. The First World War forced great changes in tactics as advances in technology rendered prior tactics useless. Technological changes can render existing tactics obsolete, and sociological changes can shift the goals and methods of warfare, requiring new tactics. Military tactics are adapted and innovated to avoid defeat.

"Gray-zone" tactics are also becoming more widely used. These include "everything from strong-arm diplomacy and economic coercion, to media manipulation and cyberattacks, to use of paramilitaries and proxy forces". The title "gray-zone" comes from the ambiguity between defense vs. offense, as well as the ambiguity between peace-keeping vs. war effort.

== See also ==
- List of military tactics
- Combat arms

== Notes ==
=== Bibliography ===
- Haskew, Michael; Jorgensen, Christer; McNab, Chris; Niderost, Eric; Rice, Rob S. (2008). Fighting Techniques of the Oriental World 1200–1860: Equipment, Combat Skills and Tactics. London, United Kingdom: Amber Books. ISBN 978-1-905704-96-5.
- Holmes, Richard; Strachan, Hew; Bellamy, Chris; Bicheno, Hugh (2001). The Oxford Companion to Military History. Oxford, United Kingdom: Oxford University Press. ISBN 978-0-19-866209-9.
