= United States Army branch insignia =

Insignia denoting a particular military speciality

Department of the Army Emblem

In the United States Army, soldiers wear insignia to denote membership in a particular area of military specialism and series of functional areas. Army branch insignia is similar to the line officer and staff corps officer devices of the U.S. Navy as well as to the Navy enlisted rating badges. The Medical, Nurse, Dental, Veterinary, Medical Service, Medical Specialist, Chaplains, and Judge Advocate General's Corps are considered "special branches", while the others are "basic branches".

Army branch insignia is separate from Army qualification badges in that qualification badges require completion of a training course or school, whereas branch insignia is issued to a service member upon assignment to a particular area of the Army.

== History ==
The first use of Army branch insignia was just prior to the American Civil War in 1859 for use on the black felt hat. A system of branch colors, indicated by piping on uniforms of foot soldiers and lace for mounted troops, was first authorized in the 1851 uniform regulations, with Prussian blue denoting infantry, scarlet for artillery, orange for dragoons, green for mounted rifles, and black for staff. When the U.S. Army began developing a series of colored rank epaulets for wear by officers of various Army branches, the scheme included yellow for cavalry officers, red for artillery officers, and light blue or white for infantry officers. General officers wore dark blue epaulets, whilst doctors wore green.

By the start of the 20th century, Army personnel began wearing various branch insignia on the stand-up collars of the Army dress uniform. Branch insignia was also worn by officers on the wool uniform shirt when worn as outerwear. Enlisted soldiers wore a version enclosed in a brass disk while officers wore a full sized version not enclosed. This has continued to the modern age.

Members of Infantry, Armor (including Cavalry), Special Forces, Aviation, Engineer, Field Artillery and Air Defense Artillery regiments may wear a version of the insignia in which the regimental number is included in the insignia. For Air Defense Artillery and Aviation, the number is mounted on the center of the face. For Infantry, Cavalry, Special Forces and Field Artillery, the number is placed immediately above, but not covering, the intersection of the crossed rifles, sabres, arrows, or cannon, respectively. For Armor, the number is placed immediately above the tank.

Branch insignia for Soldiers not affiliated with an infantry, armor, field artillery, air defense artillery, cavalry, special forces, or aviation regiment, generally wear their assigned basic branch insignia; however, as an option, Soldiers who are not affiliated with one of the above regiments, but who are assigned to a color-bearing regiment or separate operational battalion of their branch, may wear their branch insignia with the numerical designation of the battalion or regiment affixed, when approved by the Army command (ACOM) commander, Army service component command commander, or Army direct reporting unit commander. Officers and enlisted personnel assigned to cavalry regiments, cavalry squadrons, or separate cavalry troops are authorized to wear cavalry collar insignia in lieu of the branch insignia, when approved by the ACOM commander.

Certain special assignment insignia is worn in place of branch insignia to denote the officer's or NCO's particular responsibility. The enlisted versions of these are borne on a golden disk in the same manner as their customary branch device. Officers so assigned continue to wear their basic branch colors on the epaulets of the blue Army Service Uniform and the Army Blue Mess uniform.

- Officers and NCOs serving a term in an Inspector General billet wear Inspector General insignia.
- Officers assigned to general staff billets wear General Staff insignia.
- Officers assigned as aides-de-camp wear aide-de-camp insignia which denotes the rank of the officer or official whom they serve.
- Nominative sergeants major will wear nominative Senior Enlisted Leader collar insignia (previously referred to as command sergeant major insignia or enlisted branch immaterial insignia) worn by command sergeants major and sergeants major when in a position rated by a general officer or senior executive service level civilian.
- The sergeant major assigned as the Sergeant Major of the Army wears unique insignia based upon that of an aide-de-camp to the Army Chief of Staff.
- If the Senior Enlisted Advisor to the Chairman is selected from the Army, that sergeant major wears unique insignia based upon that of an aide-de-camp to the Chairman of the Joint Chiefs of Staff.

From 1920, warrant officers, being appointed into the Army "at large", wore the warrant officer device rather than branch insignia on their lapels and a larger warrant officer device on the service cap. Likewise, they wore brown as a branch color no matter their basic specialty. In 2004, warrant officers adopted the insignia and colors of the branch corresponding to their specialty and began wearing the officer insignia on the service cap.

Aside from Army custom, the Army Chief of Staff, former Chiefs of Staff, and generals of the Army (five-star) may prescribe their branch insignia. All other general officers may wear branch insignia at their option. If they choose this option, general officers will wear the branch insignia for the position to which they are appointed, or for their duty assignment. Army custom is that general officers wear no branch insignia, as they deal with echelons far above the basic branch level. Exceptions, however exist, as with the commandants of the various branches retain the respective insignia and Dean of the U.S. Military Academy wears the Professor, USMA insignia.

== Wear of Insignia ==
The 21st century Army displays branch insignia on the blue Army Service Uniform coats; it was similarly worn on the Army Green uniform coat until that uniform was withdrawn from wear in 2015. Branch insignia was also similarly worn on rarely seen Army White uniform coat prior to that uniform being declared obsolete and unauthorized in 2006. Enlisted soldiers wear the branch insignia disk on the wearer's left coat collar, opposite the "U.S." insignia disk. All officers, apart from most general officers, wear branch insignia on both lapels, beneath the "U.S." insignia on both coat lapels. Most general officers wear only the "U.S." insignia on both coat lapels, and no branch insignia; chaplains, judge advocates, and senior branch chiefs such as the Chief Engineer and the Quartermaster General are exceptions to this custom, and wear branch insignia in the same manner as typical officers. Other branch chiefs (i.e.: Chief of Infantry, Chief of Artillery, Chief of Intelligence, etc.) may at their option wear the insignia of their branch as other officers; similarly, the Inspector General and Deputy Inspector General wear the inspector general insignia on their lapels in the same manner as other officers serving on inspector general tours.

Branch insignia is also worn by commissioned and warrant officers on the left collar of the hospital duty uniform and the arctic fatigues; rank is worn on the right collar. Chaplains wear branch insignia above the right breast pocket of Class B shirts; no other personnel wear branch insignia on Class B uniforms. Similarly, chaplains are the only soldiers who wear branch insignia on the Army Combat Uniform; chaplains also wear branch insignia on helmets and patrol caps in the place of rank insignia.

== Branch of service insignia ==
The following are the current branch insignia emblems of the United States Army:

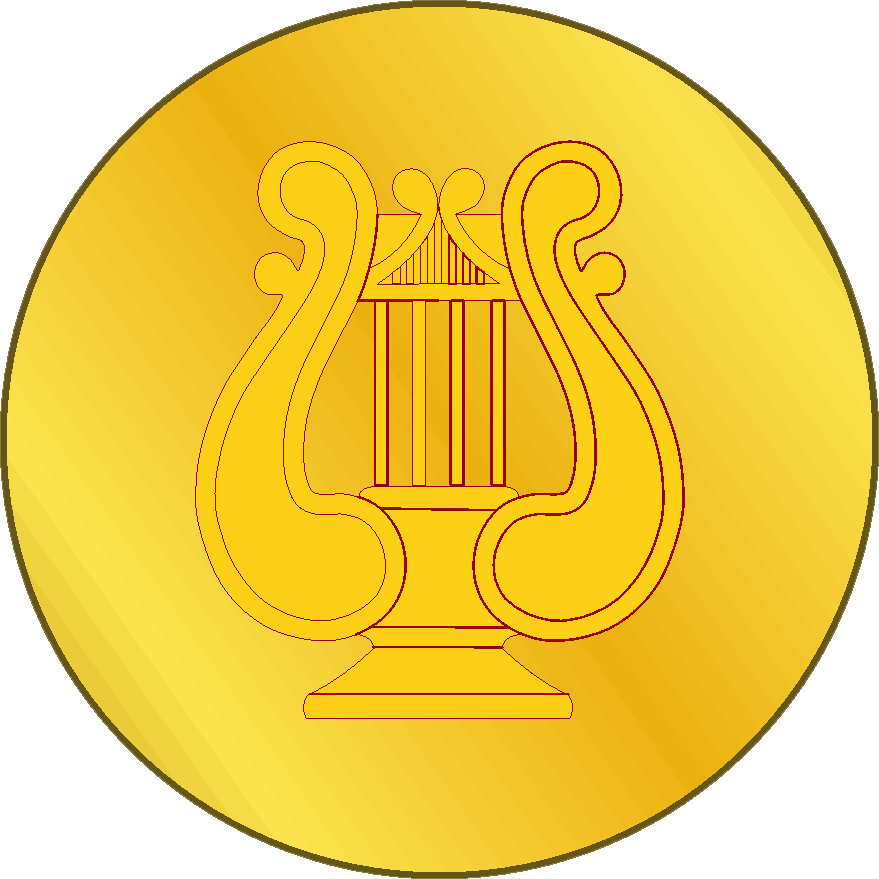
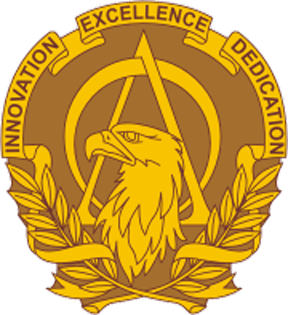
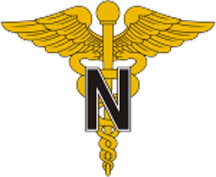
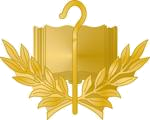
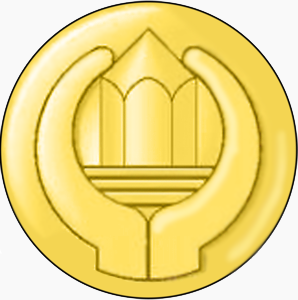
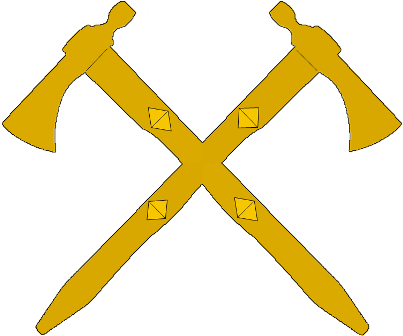
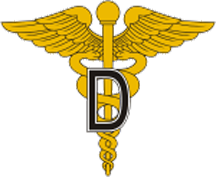
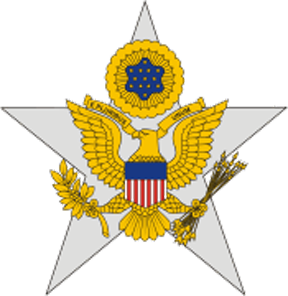
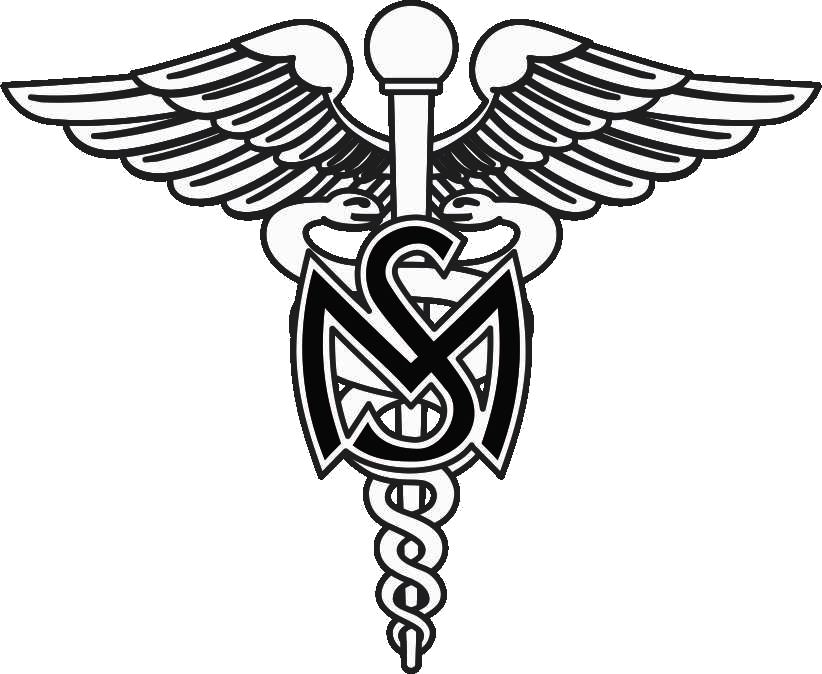
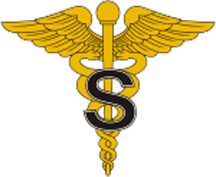
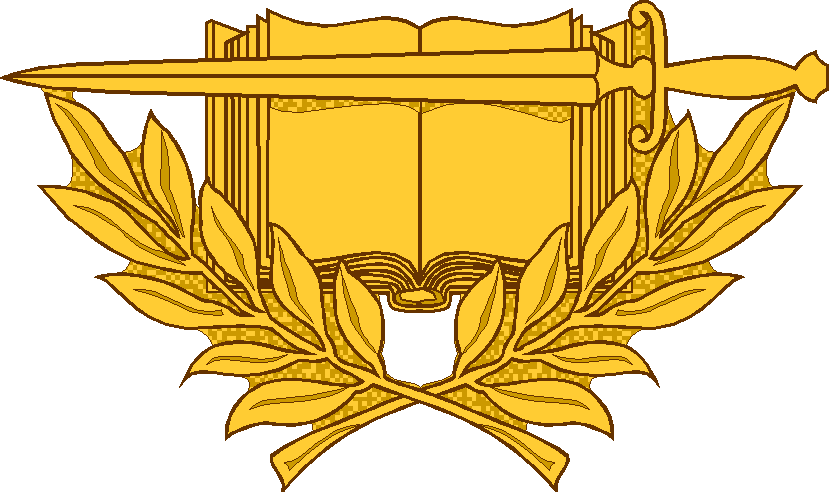
Branch	Insignia	Color	Description
Army Bands AB		Old Glory Blue	A lyre, on a 25 millimeters (one inch) disk, all in gold color metal. Enlisted only. [A division of the Adjutant General's Corps, commissioned and warrant officers wear Adjutant General insignia, shown below.]
Acquisition Corps AC		Black	A gold color metal device 1 inch (2.5 cm) in height overall consisting of the Alpha and Omega interlaced, superimposed by an eagle's head erased, all enclosed around the top with a gold tripartite scroll inscribed “INNOVATION” “EXCELLENCE” “DEDICATION” in incised letters; around the bottom entwined by the scroll ends are two laurel branches crossed at base all gold. Enlisted only.
Air Defense Artillery AD		Scarlet	A missile surmounting two crossed field guns, all of gold colored metal, 30 millimeters (1 1/8 in) in height.
Adjutant General's Corps AG		Dark Blue and Scarlet Piping	A silver metal and enamel shield 25 millimeters (one inch) in height on which are 13 vertical stripes, seven silver and six red; on a blue chief one large and 12 small silver stars. The enlisted version is entirely gold-colored metal.
Army Nurse Corps AN		Maroon and White Piping	A gold color medal caduceus, 25 millimeters (one inch) in height, bearing an 'N' in black enamel, centered. Commissioned officers only.
Armor AR		Yellow	The front view of an M26 Pershing tank, gun slightly raised, superimposed on two crossed cavalry sabers in scabbards, cutting edge up, 20 millimeters (13/16 in) in height overall, of gold color metal.
Aviation AV		Ultramarine Blue and Golden Orange Piping	A silver propeller in a vertical position between two gold wings in a horizontal position, 30 millimeters (1 1/8 in) in width. The enlisted version is entirely gold color metal.
Chaplain Corps - Christian Faith CH		Black	A silver color Latin Cross, 25 millimeters (one inch) in height. Commissioned officers only.
Chaplain Corps - Jewish Faith CH		Black	The Decalogue, bearing Hebrew numerals from 1 to 10 surmounted by a Star of David, all of silver color, 25 millimeters (one inch) in height. Commissioned officers only.
Chaplain Corps - Buddhist Faith CH		Black	A silver color Dharmacakra, 25 millimeters (one inch) in height. Commissioned officers only.
Chaplain Corps - Chaplain Candidate CH		Black	Over the lower corners of an open book, two laurel branches crossed at the stems overall a shepherd's crook, all gold. The insignia is 1 inch (2.5 cm) in height and 1 1/4 inches (3.2 cm) in width. Commissioned officers only.
Chaplain Corps - Hindu Faith CH		Black	A silver color Aum, 25 millimeters (one inch) in height. Commissioned officers only.
Chaplain Corps - Muslim Faith CH		Black	A silver color Crescent, 25 millimeters (one inch) in height. Commissioned officers only.
Chaplain Corps - Religious Affairs Specialist CA		Black	Stylized hands supporting a chapel, doors open, on a 25 millimeters (one inch) disk of gold color metal. Enlisted only.
Chemical Corps CM		Cobalt Blue and Golden Yellow Piping	A benzene ring of cobalt blue enamel superimposed in the center of crossed gold color retorts, 13 millimeters (1/2 in) in height and 45 millimeters (1 3/4 in) in width overall. The enlisted version lacks the enamel.
Civil Affairs Corps CA		Purple and White Piping	On a globe 15 millimeters (5/8 in) in diameter, a torch of liberty 25 millimeters (one inch) in height surmounted by a scroll and a sword crossed in saltire, all of gold color. For Special Operations CAs, crossed pipes with tomahawks mounted on tip, all in gold, are worn; known as the "Pipehawk" insignia.
Cavalry CV		Yellow	Two crossed sabers in scabbards (right over left), cutting edge up, 17 millimeters (11/16 in) in height, of gold color metal.
Cyber Corps CY		Steel Gray and Black Piping	Two crossed lightning bolts, surmounted by a vertical dagger, pointed up, all gold, 13/16 inches in height and 1 7/16 inch wide
Dental Corps DC		Maroon and White Piping	A gold color medal caduceus, 25 millimeters (one inch) in height, bearing a 'D' in black enamel, centered. Commissioned officers only.
Corps of Engineers EN		Scarlet and White Piping	A gold color triple-turreted castle, 17 millimeters (11/16 in) in height.
Field Artillery FA		Scarlet	Two crossed field guns (left over right), gold color metal, 20 millimeters (13/16 in) in height.
Finance Corps FI		Silver Gray and Golden Yellow Piping	A gold color diamond, 25 by 19 millimeters (1 by 3/4 in), short axis vertical.
General Staff GS		Black and Gold Piping	The coat of arms of the United States, 15 millimeters (5/8 in) in height, of gold color metal superimposed on a five-pointed silver color star, 25 millimeters (one inch) in circumscribing diameter. The shield to be in enamel stripes white and red, chief of blue, and the glory blue. Commissioned and warrant officers only; but see similar Senior Enlisted Leader insignia.
Infantry IN		Infantry Blue	Two gold color crossed 1795 Springfield muskets (right over left), 19 millimeters (3/4 in) in height.
Inspector General IG		Dark Blue and Light Blue Piping	A sword and fasces 19 millimeters (3/4 in) in height, crossed and wreathed in gold color metal with the inscription "DROIT ET AVANT" (Right and Forward) in blue enamel on the upper part of the wreath. The enlisted version lacks the enamel.
Judge Advocate General's Corps JA		Dark Blue and White Piping	A gold color sword and pen crossed and superimposed on a laurel wreath, 17 millimeters (11/16 in) in height.
Logistics Corps LG		Soldier Red and Bronze Piping	A diagonally crossed cannon, muzzle up and key, ward down and pointing in, surmounted by a ship's steering wheel, all in gold colored metal; bearing on the hub a stylized star and inscribed on the ship's wheel in Latin, above “SUSTINENDUM” and below “VICTORIAM” all in soldier red. Overall dimension is 1 inch (2.5 cm) in height. Commissioned officers only; officers continue to wear their basic branch colors until completion of the Captain's Career Course at which time they wear the Logistics branch insignia and soldier red and bronze branch colors.
Medical Corps MC		Maroon and White Piping	A gold color medal caduceus, 25 millimeters (one inch) in height. All enlisted soldiers serving in medical, dental, or veterinary specialties wear the enlisted version of the Medical Corps insignia without the letters described below, all in gold color metal.
Medical Service Corps MS		Maroon and White Piping	A silver color medal caduceus, 25 millimeters (one inch) in height, bearing a superimposed 'MS' monogram in black enamel, centered. Commissioned and warrant officers only.
Army Medical Specialist Corps SP		Maroon and White Piping	A gold color medal caduceus, 25 millimeters (one inch) in height, bearing an 'S' in black enamel, centered. Commissioned and warrant officers only.
Military Intelligence Corps MI		Oriental Blue and Silver Gray Piping	On a gold color metal dagger, point up, 32 millimeters (1 1/4 in) overall in height, a gold color metal heraldic sun composed of four straight and four wavy alternating rays surmounted by a gold heraldic rose, the petals are dark blue enamel. The enlisted version lacks the enamel.
Military Police Corps MP		Green and Yellow Piping	Two crossed gold color Harper's Ferry Model 1805 pistols (right over left) 19 millimeters (3/4 in) in height.
National Guard Bureau NG		Dark Blue	Two crossed gold color metal fasces superimposed on an eagle displayed with wings reversed, 19 millimeters (3/4 in) in height. The insignia is authorized for wear; however, almost all officers wear their respective branch insignia. Commissioned and warrant officers only.
Ordnance Corps OD		Crimson and Yellow Piping	A gold color metal shell and flame, 25 millimeters (one inch) in height.
Psychological Operations PO		Bottle Green and Silver Gray Piping	Crossed daggers with blade forming a lightning bolt, superimposed by a knight chess piece.
Public Affairs PA		Brittany Blue and Silver Gray Piping	A vertical broadsword set against a cross quill with pen and a lightning bolt, on a 25 millimeters (one inch) disk, all in gold color metal.
Quartermaster Corps QM		Buff	A gold color eagle with wings spread perched on a wheel with a blue felloe set with 13 gold stars, having 13 gold spokes and the hub white with a red center; superimposed on the wheel a gold sword and key crossed diagonally hilt and bow up. The insignia is 19 millimeters (3/4 in) in height. The enlisted version is entirely gold color metal.
Senior Enlisted Leader SE		Teal Blue and Yellow Piping	The coat of arms of the United States, on a 25 millimeters (one inch) disk, all in gold color metal. Worn only by command sergeants major and sergeants major when in a position rated by a general officer or senior executive service level civilian.
Signal Corps SC		Orange and White Piping	Two signal flags crossed, dexter flag white with a red center, the sinister flag red with a white center, staffs gold, with a flaming torch of gold color metal upright at center of crossed flags; 22 millimeters (7/8 in) in height. The enlisted version is entirely gold color metal.
Space Operations SO		Black and Red Piping	A gold globe representing earth as seen from space, encircled by a lightning bolt in orbit representing its heritage in signals and electronic warfare with crossed sword and arrow behind. The sword and arrow show the branch's purpose in both offensive and defensive areas.
Special Forces SF		Jungle Green	Two crossed arrows (right over left) 19 millimeters (3/4 in) in height and 35 millimeters (1 3/8 in) in width all gold color. It used to be the branch insignia of the United States Army Indian Scouts and later the 1st Special Service Force.
Staff Specialist USAR/ARNG SS		Green	A sword 35 millimeters (1 3/8 in) in length laid horizontally across the upper part of an open book. Below the sword and across the lower corners of the book two laurel branches cross at the stems. Insignia 19 millimeters (3/4 in) in height of gold color metal. Commissioned officers only.
Transportation Corps TC		Brick Red and Golden Yellow Piping	A ship's steering wheel, superimposed thereon a shield charged with a winged car wheel on a rail, all of gold color metal, 25 millimeters (one inch) in height.
Veterinary Corps VC		Maroon and White Piping	A gold color medal caduceus, 25 millimeters (one inch) in height, bearing a 'V' in black enamel, centered. Commissioned officers only.

== Aide-de-camp and senior enlisted advisors ==
Although not considered a branch of service, U.S. Army officers assigned as aides to flag or equivalent grade officers replace their branch of service insignia for a special aide-de-camp insignia that denote the grade or position of the officer the aide supports. Because these collar insignia are branch immaterial, officers continue to wear their original branch of service colors and Army Regimental System insignia.

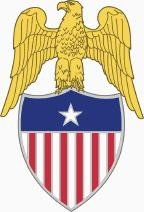
Insignia for an aide to a brigadier general

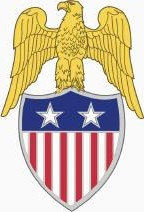
Insignia for an aide to a major general

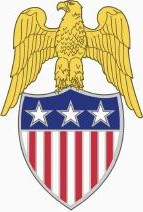
Insignia for an aide to a lieutenant general

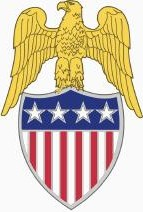
Insignia for an aide to a general

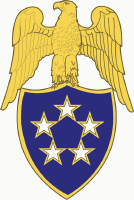
Insignia for an aide to a general of the Army

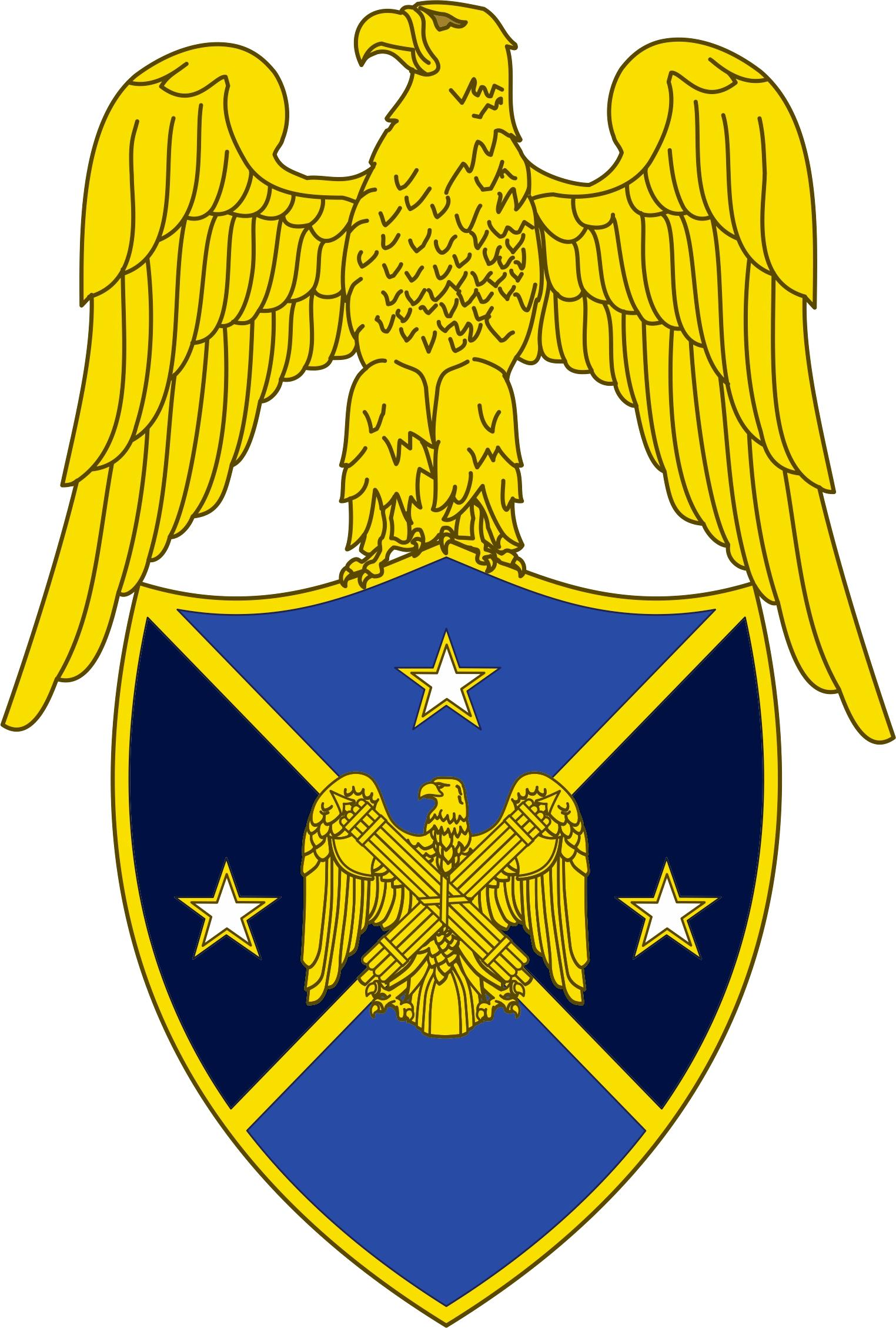
Insignia for an aide to the Vice Chief of the National Guard Bureau

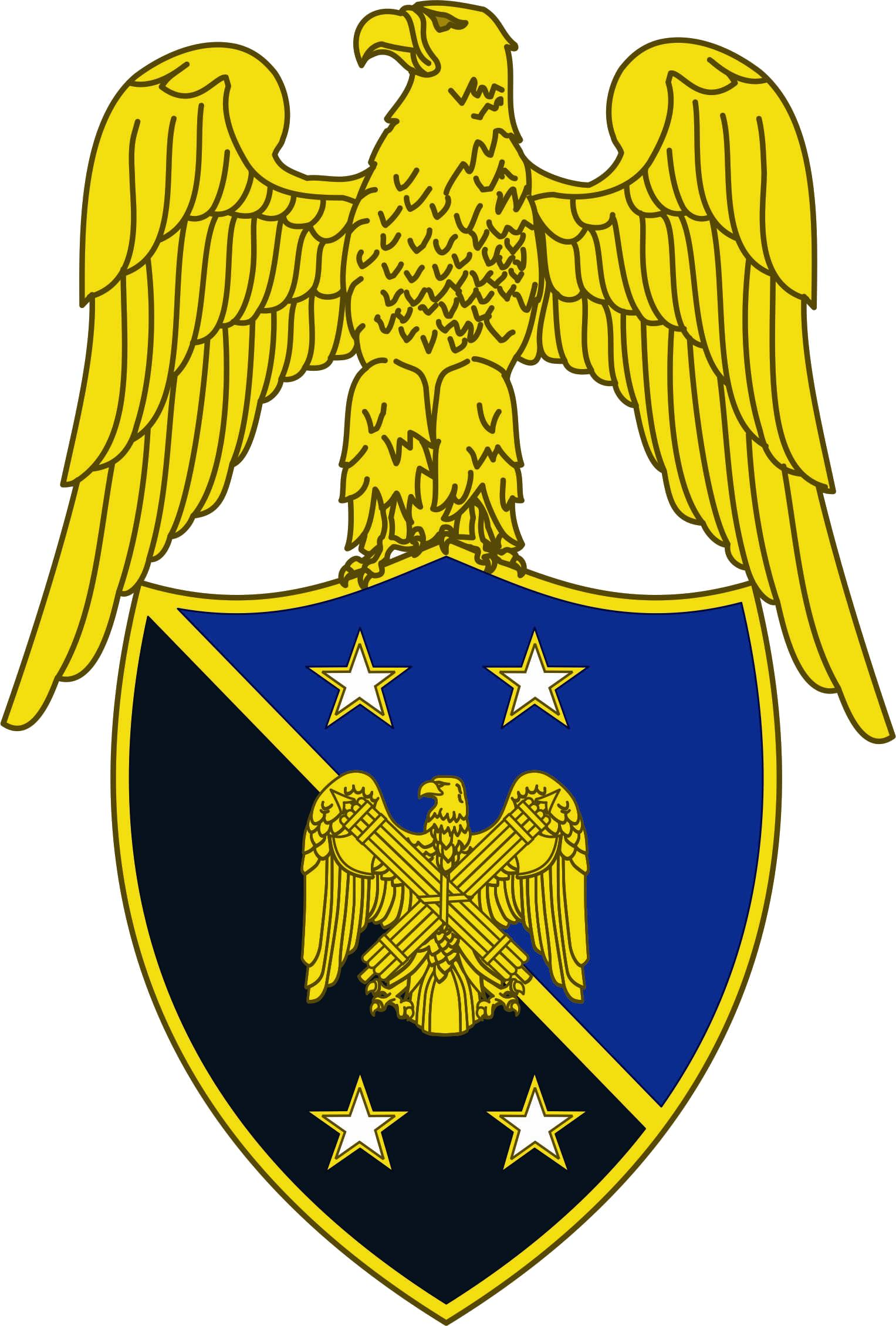
Insignia for an aide to the Chief of the National Guard Bureau

Insignia for an aide to the Vice Chief of Staff of the Army

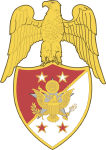
Insignia for an aide to the Chief of Staff of the Army

Insignia for an aide to the Under Secretary of the Army

Insignia for an aide to the Secretary of the Army

Insignia for an aide to the Vice Chairman of the Joint Chiefs of Staff

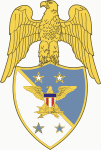
Insignia for an aide to the Chairman of the Joint Chiefs of Staff

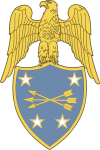
Insignia for an aide to the Secretary of Defense

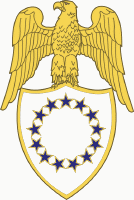
Insignia for an aide to the Vice President of the United States

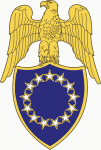
Insignia for an aide to the President of the United States

Army Command Sergeants Major holding the rank/position of Sergeant Major of the Army and Senior Enlisted Advisor to the Chairman of the Joint Chiefs of Staff replace their Command Sergeant Major/Branch Immaterial insignia with a unique insignia that replicates the shield of the Aide-de-camp insignia to the Army Chief of Staff and Aide-de-camp insignia to the Chairman of the Joint Chiefs of Staff respectively. These shields are superimposed on top of a gold disk, which is traditional for all enlisted branch of service insignia.

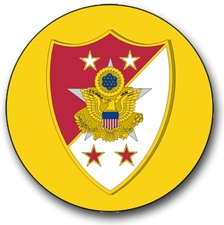
Insignia for Sergeant Major of the Army

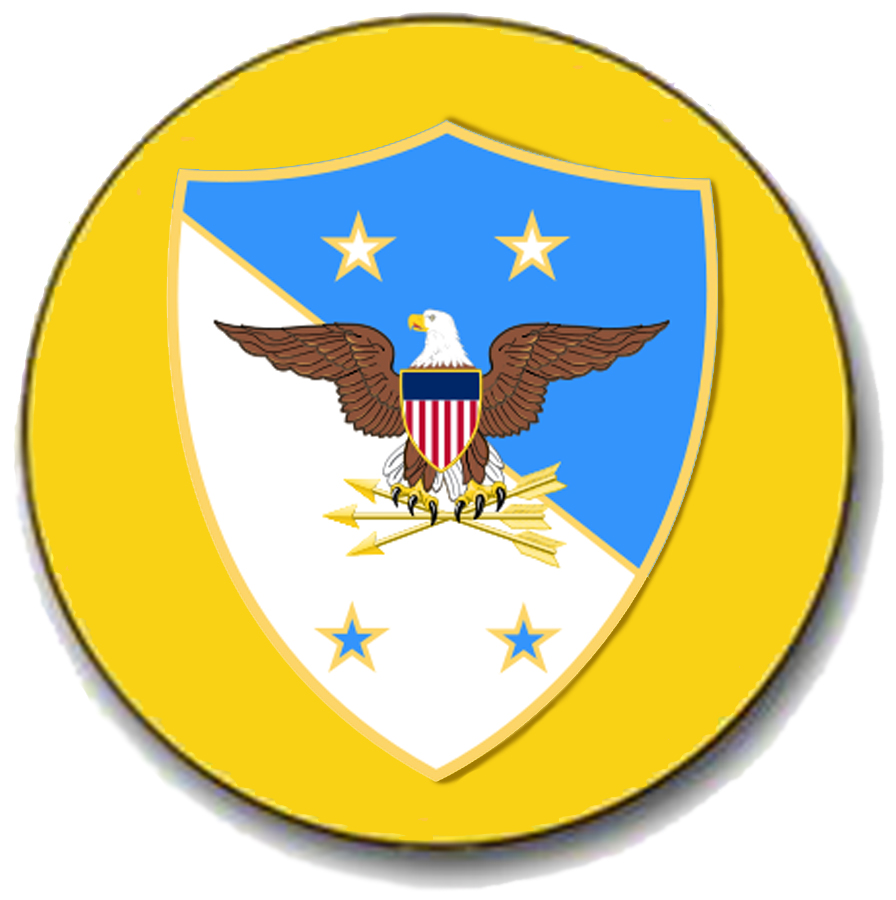
Insignia for Senior Enlisted Advisor to the Chairman of the Joint Chiefs of Staff

== Obsolete insignia ==
The following insignia are no longer used:

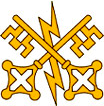
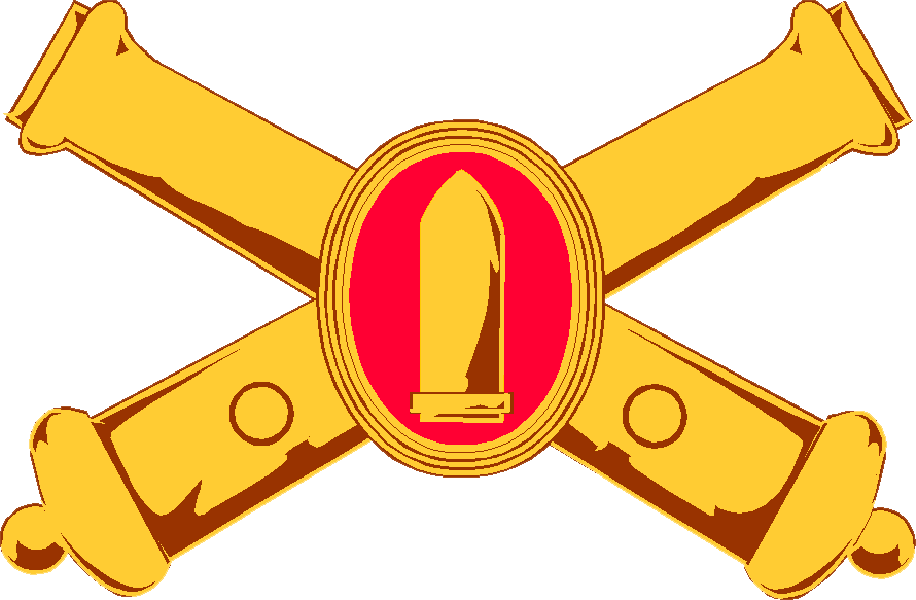
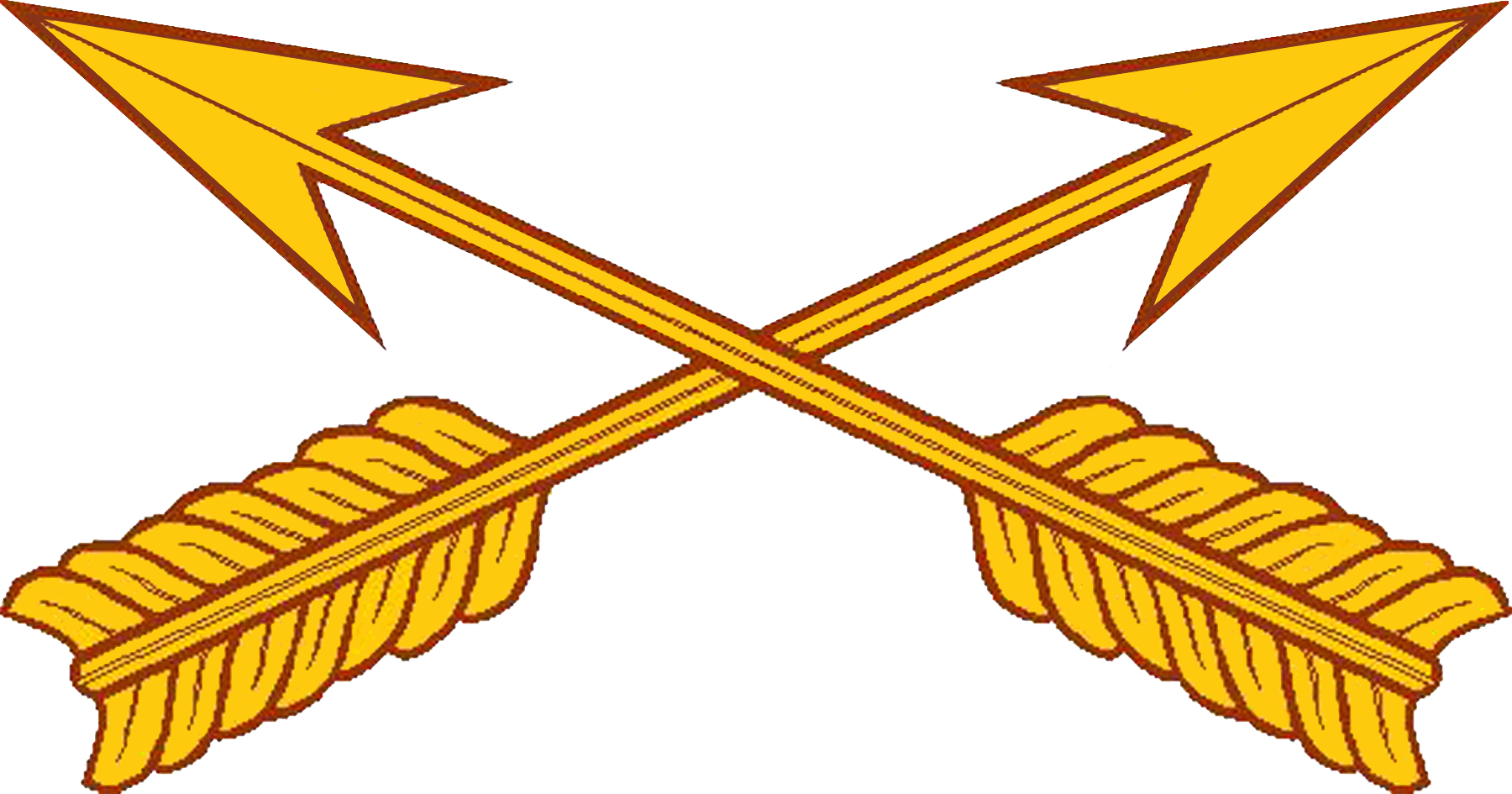
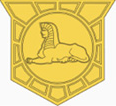
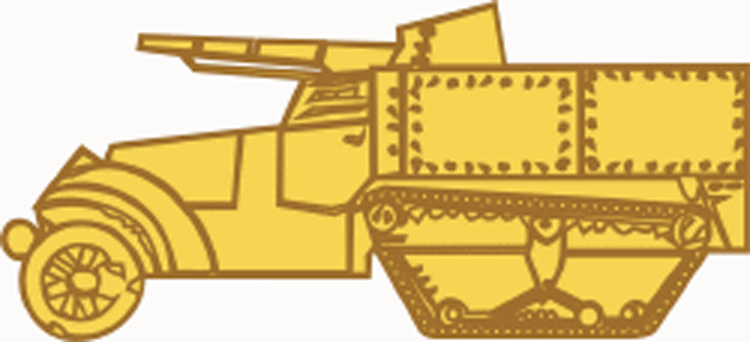
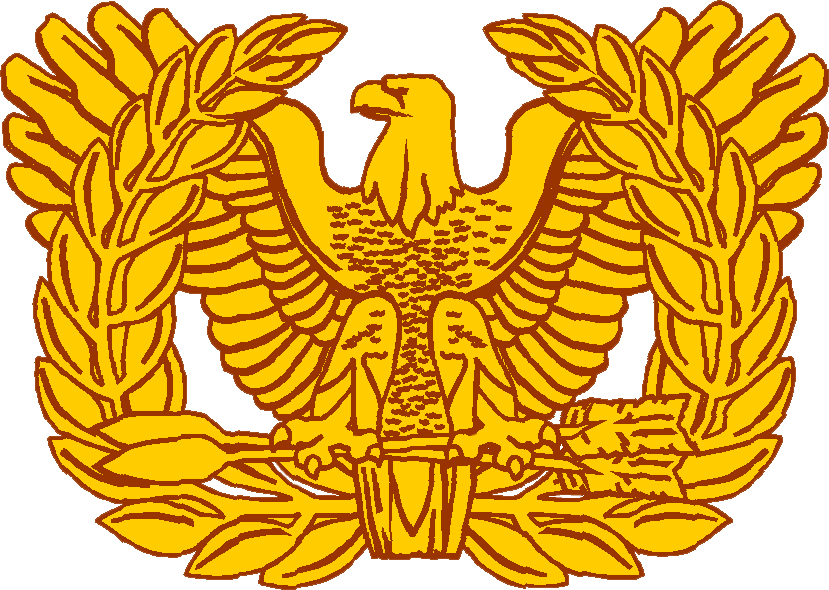
Branch	Insignia	Color	Dates	Description
Army Security Branch (USAR)		Teal Blue and White Piping	1954–1967	The insignia was authorized on 1 February 1954 as a result of the Reserve Army Security Branch being created by General Order 110 dated 15 December 1952. The lightning bolt signifies communications and the crossed keys represent secrecy, authority, and guardianship. The Army Security Branch (USAR) was merged with the newly established Army Intelligence and Security Branch on 1 July 1962. The branch was redesignated to the Military Intelligence Branch on 1 July 1967, and is now called the Military Intelligence Corps.
Bureau of Insular Affairs		Dark blue	1902–1939	A bunch of seven arrows, points up, superimposed on a pair of wings, all gold.
Coast Artillery Corps		Scarlet	1901–1950	Two crossed field guns, gold colored metal, with a scarlet oval with a gold projectile at the intersection of the field guns, 13/16 of an inch in height overall. {Consolidated into Field Artillery Branch 1950}
Indian Scouts / 1st Special Service Force		White and Scarlet Piping	1890–1926 / 1942–1944	First authorized in 1890, silver crossed arrows were used as the hat insignia of the Indian Scouts. In 1921 the crossed arrows hat insignia became a gold collar insignia. The Indian Scouts Insignia was retired in 1926, brought back into service in 1942 as the 1st Special Service Force Insignia until 1944, then reintroduced as the Special Forces Branch Insignia in 1984.
Military Intelligence (USAR)		Golden Yellow and Purple Piping	1923–1962	The insignia was authorized on 30 July 1923. The thirteen stripes on the shield converge toward a common point at the center where sits the sphinx, the symbol of wisdom and strength, thus symbolizing the collection of information by the Military Intelligence; and conversely from the center after evaluation, the military information is disseminated. The Military Intelligence Branch (USAR) was merged with the newly established Army Intelligence and Security Branch on 1 July 1962, now called the Military Intelligence Corps.
Tank and Armor	1); 2); 3); 4); 5)	Yellow	1917–1951	On 29 December 1917, paragraph 36 change 1 to War Department Special Regulations No. 42, established the first Tank Service collar insignia (graphic 1) which was unpopular with the service; so, on 7 May 1918, change 2 to the Service Regulation announced a new design featuring a Mark V tank (graphic 2) that was popular with the troops. On 16 Mar 1921, the new Tank Service insignia was eliminated and paragraph 13b of AR 600-35 prescribed a new collar insignia designated as Infantry (Tanks) (graphic 3). On 21 March 1922, the Adjutant General approved a new design for the Infantry (Tanks) insignia (graphic 4). However, roughly twenty years later, on 25 February 1942, a new insignia was authorized for all Armored Forces which was announced in War Department Circular 56 (graphic 5). This version of the collar device remained in use until the Armor Branch was established in February 1951.
Tank Destroyer Corps		Burnt Orange and Black Piping	1942–1945	Side view of an M3 Gun Motor Carriage. No unique insignia authorized until 1942 when the Tank Destroyer Corps became independent due to a dispute over whether the infantry, artillery or cavalry would have responsibility for the Tank Destroyer Corps.
Women's Army Auxiliary Corps			1941-1942	The insignia was an upright or rising eagle (nicknamed the "Waddling Duck" or "Walking Buzzard" by WAACs)
Women's Army Corps		Mosstone Green and Old Gold Piping	1942–1978	The head of "Pallas Athene", 1 1/8 inches in height, of gold color metal.
Warrant Officer		Brown	1920–2014	An eagle rising with wings displayed standing on a bundle of two arrows, all enclosed in a wreath, all gold color 3/4 inch in height. After being deemed obsolete, the insignia was still worn until 2014 by Warrant Officer Candidates until they graduated from the Warrant Officer Basic Course. After the adoption of a new version of AR 670–1 in 2014, the warrant officer insignia was taken out of use for uniform purposes.
Electronic Warfare		Golden Yellow and Black Piping	2013–2018	A gold colored and enameled metal shield 25 mm (0.98 in) in height, on which a black pale is charged with a crossed key, ward down and pointing in, and a lightning bolt, both of gold color. The enlisted version lacks the enamel.

== See also ==
- Heraldry
- List of United States Navy staff corps
