= Director of Audit (disambiguation) =

Director of Audit is the head of the Audit Commission of Hong Kong.

Director of Audit may also refer to:

- Chief audit executive, a corporate executive position

== See also ==
- Comptroller general (disambiguation)
- Office of the Auditor General (disambiguation)
- National Audit Office (disambiguation)
- Audit Commission (disambiguation)
