= State Comptroller =

State comptroller, in certain instances spelled as "controller", can refer to:

== National comptrollers ==
- Comptroller General of Brazil
- State Comptroller of Israel

== U.S. states ==
- California State Controller
- Connecticut State Comptroller
- Florida Comptroller
- State Comptroller of Illinois
- State Comptroller of Maryland
- New Hampshire State Comptroller
- State Comptroller of New Jersey
- State Comptroller of New York
- Texas Comptroller of Public Accounts

== See also ==
- Comptroller general (disambiguation)
