= National Audit Office =

National Audit Office may refer to audit authorities of various national governments:

- Australian National Audit Office, an agency of the federal Commonwealth government, established 1901
- Bundesrechnungshof ('Federal Court of Auditors'), the Germany body, re-established in West Germany in 1948
- Court of Audit (France) (French: Cour des comptes), the Court of Audit in France, established in 1807
- National Audit Office (China) (Chinese: 中华人民共和国审计署), the supreme audit institution of the People's Republic, established in 1983
- National Audit Office of Estonia (Estonian: Riigikontroll), established by the provisional government in 1918; reestablished in 1990
- National Audit Office of Lithuania (Lithuanian: Valstybės kontrolė), the supreme audit institution in Lithuania, established 1919
- National Audit Office (United Kingdom), parliamentary body, established in its current form in 1983
- Swedish National Audit Office (Swedish: Riksrevisionen), established in its current form in 2003
- National Audit Office of Finland
- National Audit Office (Tanzania)
- National Audit Office (Sri Lanka)

== See also ==
- Audit Commission (disambiguation)
- Comptroller general (disambiguation)
- Director of Audit (disambiguation)
- Office of the Auditor General (disambiguation)
- State Audit Office (disambiguation)
