= Combat arms =

Military service branch which conducts direct military combat operations in land warfare

Combat arms (or fighting arms in non-American parlance) are troops within national armed forces who participate in direct tactical ground combat. In general, they are units that carry or employ weapons, such as infantry, cavalry, and artillery units. The use of multiple combat arms in mutually supporting ways is known as combined arms. In some armies, notably the British Army and Canadian Army, artillery and combat engineer units are categorized as combat support, while in others, such as the U.S. Army, they are considered part of the combat arms. Armored troops constitute a combat arm in name, although many have histories derived from cavalry units.

Artillery is included as a combat arm primarily based on the history of employing cannons in close combat, and later in the anti-tank role until the advent of anti-tank guided missiles. The inclusion of special forces in some armed forces as a separate combat arm is often doctrinal because the troops of special forces units are essentially specialized infantry, often with historical links to ordinary light infantry units.

== British Commonwealth Forces ==
In some Commonwealth Countries, the combat arms in the Army are:

- Infantry
- Armoured
- Artillery
- Combat Engineers
- Combat Aviation
- Field Air Defence

Field Air Defence is considered in the artillery branch in Canada, also all aviation assets are part of the RCAF not the Army.

== United States Army ==
Currently, U.S. Army organizational doctrine uses the classification "Maneuver, Fires and Effects" (MFE) to group the combat arms branches, and four other branches, into Maneuver, Fires, Maneuver Support, and United States Special Operations Forces functional areas.

The "classic" combat arms were infantry, artillery, and cavalry, defined as those branches of the army with the primary mission of engaging in armed combat with an enemy force.

In the U.S. Army, the following branches were traditionally classified from 1968 until 2001 as the combat arms:

- Infantry (1775)
- Field Artillery (Artillery 1775 / Re-designated Field Artillery 1968)
- Air Defense Artillery (Created 1968)
- Armor including Armored Cavalry, Light Cavalry, and formerly, Air Cavalry (Cavalry 1776 / Re-designated Armor 1950)

The Artillery Branch included coast artillery until it became a separate branch in 1907. The Coast Artillery also included the anti-aircraft artillery, from 1920, until its disestablishment in 1950. Anti-aircraft artillery then remained under the Artillery Branch until 1968 when it became a separate branch designated as the Air Defense Artillery Branch and the Artillery Branch was re-designated as the Field Artillery Branch. The Cavalry Branch was officially subsumed by the Armor Branch in 1950, although many units continued to have a "cavalry" designation.

Since 2001, U.S. Army doctrine has included combat aviation, special operations, and combat engineer forces into the combat arms classification.

- Army Aviation (e.g., Attack Helicopter and Air Cavalry units) (1983)

Until the creation of the Army Aviation Branch in 1983, different branches of the Army were proponent branches for specific aircraft mission/type/model aircraft. For example, UH-1 and UH-60 assault helicopters fell under the Infantry Branch, UH-1 and UH-60 MEDEVAC units were Medical Service Corps, cargo aircraft units, such as the CH-47, CH-54, and CV-2/C-7 belonged to the Transportation Corps, OV-1 airplanes were under the Military Intelligence Corps, AH-1 and AH-64 attack helicopters, as well as OH-6 and OH-58 observation helicopters came under either Armor (for attack helicopter and air cavalry units) or Field Artillery for aerial rocket artillery (ARA) batteries. Only those Army Aviation units directly involved in armed combat such as air cavalry, attack helicopter, aerial rocket artillery, or assault helicopter operations were properly considered as "combat arms".

Army Aviation, as distinguished from the Army Air Forces (AAF 1941–1947) and its predecessor, the Army Air Corps (AAC 1926–1942), officially began on 6 June 1942 with the authorization for organic liaison airplanes to perform air observation for artillery units. (From 20 June 1941 until 9 March 1942, the AAF and the AAC simultaneously existed as "branches" of the U.S. Army).

From 1942 until 1983, the Army did not have an "aviation branch", rather its officers (minus warrant officers) and enlisted personnel were commissioned into basic branches or assigned (for enlisted soldiers) to various branch affiliated units depending upon their specific Military Occupational Specialty (MOS). Commissioned officers (second lieutenant through lieutenant colonel) were usually assigned to aviation units under the proponency of their parent branch.

This meant that most Infantry officers were assigned to assault helicopter units while Armor and Field Artillery officers were most likely assigned to attack helicopter or aerial rocket artillery units, respectively. Both Infantry and Armor branch commissioned officer aviators were assigned to Air Cavalry units, as these squadrons consisted of troops containing a mix of attack helicopter, aerial reconnaissance, and "aero-rifle" platoons. Other branches routinely providing commissioned officer aviators were the Medical Service Corps, Military Intelligence Corps, and the Transportation Corps for their own branch-affiliated aviation units. More rarely, there were some officers of the Air Defense Artillery, Corps of Engineers, Ordnance Corps, and Signal Corps rated as Army Aviators and assigned to various Army Aviation units.

Until 2004, Army warrant officer (WO) aviators were appointed/commissioned into the Warrant Officer Corps in the Army "at large" and in a WO MOS in which they were qualified depending upon the aircraft category (i.e., fixed-wing or rotary-wing) and the mission/type/model(s) of aircraft in which they were rated. They were then assigned to Army Aviation units as needed for their specific aircraft qualifications.

- Special Forces (1987)

From 1952 until 1987, Army Special Forces (SF) were essentially a subset of the Infantry Branch with most of its officers and many of its enlisted soldiers coming from traditional infantry MOS backgrounds; however, in 1987 owing to a heightened emphasis on special operations, SF was established as a combat arms basic branch.

- Corps of Engineers (1775) (Combat Engineers 2001)

Combat engineer units provide mobility, counter-mobility, and survivability capabilities to support maneuver units, and have a secondary mission to fight as infantry.

== United States Marine Corps ==
United States Marine Corps doctrine designates only Infantry forces as Combat Arms, with all other Ground Combat Element forces (Field Artillery, Assault Amphibian, Combat Engineer, Light Armored Reconnaissance, Reconnaissance, and Tank) considered Combat Support. Air Defense, as a part of Marine Aviation, is contained within the Aviation Combat Element.

== See also ==
- Branches of the U.S. Army
- Combat service support
- Combat service support (United States)
- Combat support
- U.S. Army Combat Arms Regimental System
- U.S. Army Regimental System

== Sources ==
- Hofmann, George F. (2006). Through mobility we conquer: the mechanization of U.S. Cavalry. Lexington, Ky.: Univ. Press of Kentucky. ISBN 978-0813124032.
- Rush, Robert S. (2006). Enlisted soldier's guide (7th ed.). Mechanicsburg, PA: Stackpole Books. ISBN 978-0811733120.
