= New Hampshire State Comptroller =

Comptroller of New Hampshire
- Seal of New Hampshire
- Incumbent; Dana Call since 2017
- Division of Accounting, Department of Administrative Services
- Appointer: Governor
- Constituting instrument: RSA 21-I:8
- Website: https://www.das.nh.gov/accounting/contacts.aspx

The Comptroller of New Hampshire, also called the Director of Accounting Services is the chief financial officer of the US state of New Hampshire, appointed by its Governor. Dana Call succeeded Gerard Murphy after his resignation as comptroller.

== Duties ==
The duties of the Comptroller of New Hampshire are defined in New Hampshire state law as follows:

"The comptroller shall direct the state's accounting functions... to the end that the fiscal affairs of all state agencies and departments will be adequately and uniformly serviced and that periodic financial and management reports will be available to serve the various needs of all state agencies and the executive and legislative branches in their decision making processes."

== Pay ==
According to New Hampshire government website TransparentNH, the Comptroller was paid US$140,348.12 in 2022.
