= Office of the Auditor General =

Office of the Auditor General may refer to:

- Office of the Auditor General (Burma)
- Office of the Auditor General of Colombia
- Office of the Auditor-General (Kenya)
- Office of the Auditor General Manitoba
- Office of the Auditor General (Nepal)
- Office of the Auditor General (New Zealand)
- Office of the Auditor General of Norway
- Office of the Auditor General (Roman Curia), an administrative institution of the Holy See
- Office of the Auditor General (Thailand), now known as the State Audit Office (Thailand)

== See also ==
- Comptroller general (disambiguation)
- Director of Audit (disambiguation)
- National Audit Office (disambiguation)
- Audit Commission (disambiguation)
