= Combat service support =

Logistical aspect of war

The term combat service support (or CSS) is utilized by numerous military organizations throughout the world to describe entities that provide direct and indirect sustainment services to the groups that engage (or are potentially to be engaged) in combat.

== United Kingdom ==
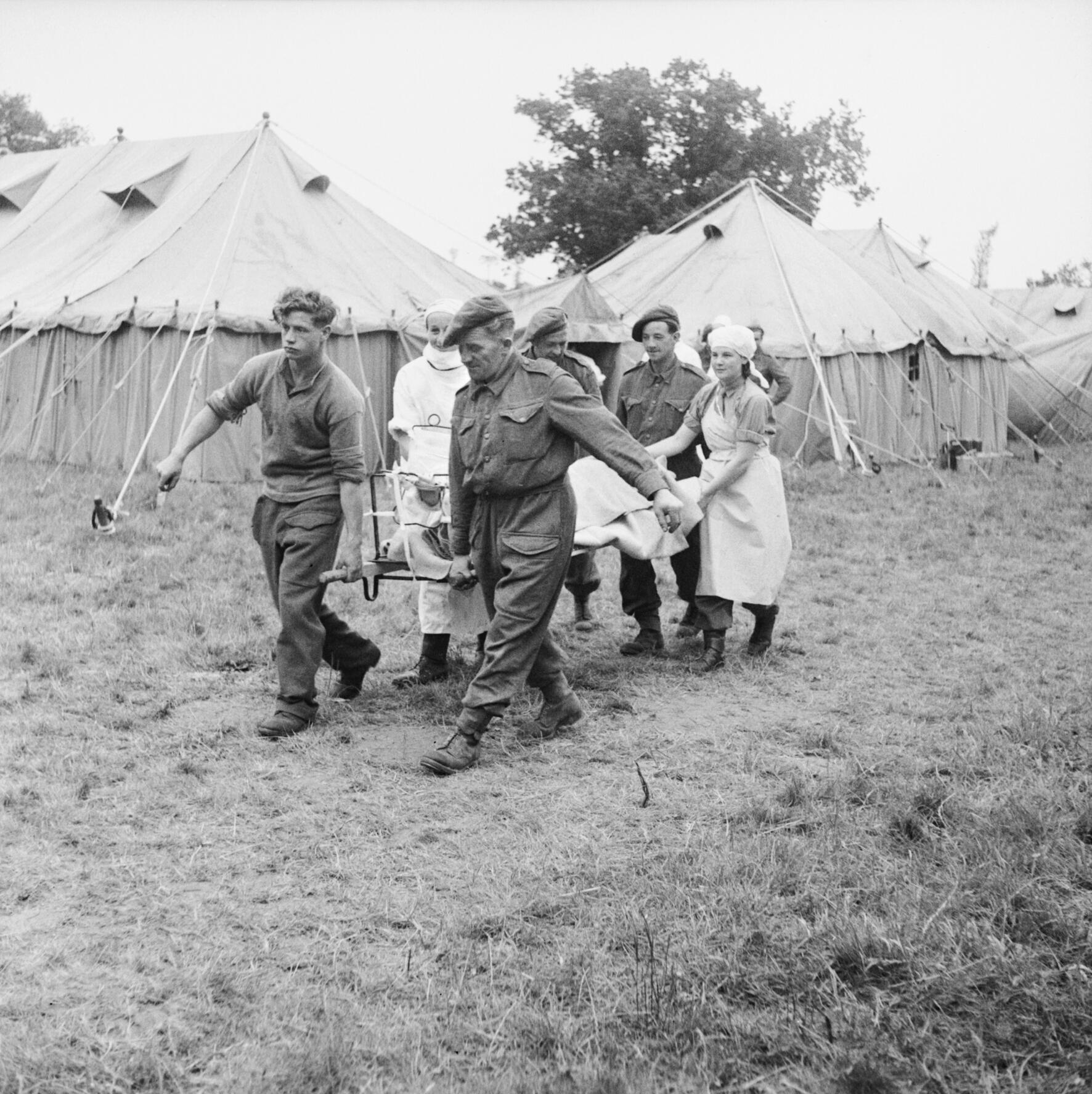
Operation Overlord: Members of the Royal Army Medical Corps carry a wounded soldier out an operating tent on 20 June 1944.

Former Defence Secretary Philip Hammond has described the United Kingdom's armed forces as having "teeth", units that are trained and equipped for actual fighting, that cannot function without an able, innovative "tail", units providing assistance such as logistical and transport capabilities. Specific groups involved in the U.K. armed forces include the Royal Army Medical Corps and Royal Logistic Corps.

== United States ==
In the United States, the term combat service support has been phased-out in favor of the term "sustainment." but the mission remains the same; to manage the logistics supply chain and provide all materiel, maintenance, transportation, health services, personnel services and other services required by the warfighting units to permit those units to accomplish their missions in combat. The US Army accomplishes this mission through the use of Sustainment Brigades at division- and corps-level.

The traditional combat service support branches in the US Army include Acquisition Corps, the Adjutant General's Corps, the Finance Corps, the Logistics Corps, the Ordnance Corps, the Quartermaster Corps, and the Transportation Corps. See also Sustainment Brigades in the United States Army.

== Australia ==
Within the Australian Army, combat service support is provided to combat elements at various levels: first line (organic to battalion or regimental level), second line (at brigade level), and third line (at formation or higher). Thus, for example an infantry unit such as the 5th Battalion, Royal Australian Regiment will include a logistics company which fills supply, transportation and maintenance functions, while a combat brigade, such as the 7th Brigade, will be supported by a combat service support battalion such as the 7th Combat Service Support Battalion. At formation level, a CSS brigade – the 17th Sustainment Brigade – will provide health, signals, catering, transport, and other service support requirements.

== See also ==
- Branches of the U.S. Army
- Combat arms
- Combat support
- Logistics
- Military logistics
- Military organization
- Principles of sustainment
- U.S. Army Combat Arms Regimental System
- U.S. Army Regimental System
