= Audit Commission =

Audit Commission can refer to:

- Audit Commission (Hong Kong), a current Hong Kong government agency
- Commission of Audit, a current Macao government agency
- Commission on Audit, a current Philippine government agency
- Audit Commission (United Kingdom), a former public corporation from 1983 to 2015 in the United Kingdom

== See also ==
- Supreme audit institution
  - Director of Audit (disambiguation)
  - Office of the Auditor General
  - National Audit Office
- Public accounts committee
  - Public Accounts Committee (India)
- State Comptroller (disambiguation)
