= Staff Specialist Corps =

U.S. Army's staff corps for unassigned officers

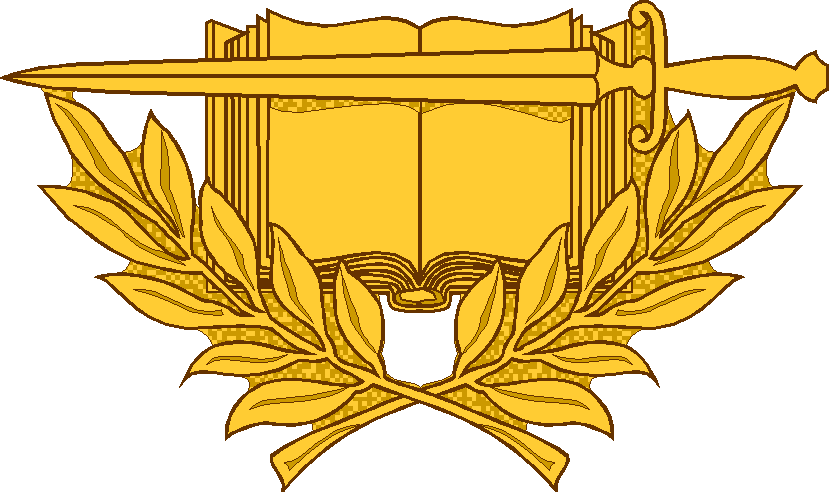
- Staff Specialist Corps branch insignia
- Country: United States
- Branch: U.S. Army
- Branch color: Green

Staff Specialist Corps
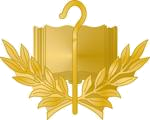
- Chaplain Candidates branch insignia
- Country: United States
- Branch: U.S. Army
- Branch color: Black

The Staff Specialist Corps is a combat service support branch of the United States Army. Currently it is used by the United States Army Reserve and United States National Guard for unassigned officers. It was formerly the Staff and Administrative Reserve Section of the reserve forces.

The insignia is also used by the “Profesionales Oficiales de Reserva” or POR of the Colombian military. This is a branch of voluntary professionals that put their abilities in the service of the Army, Armada and Air Force. They receive ranks that go from Second Lieutenant to Colonel.

== Chaplains Candidate ==
The only exception to the Staff Specialist Corps branch insignia is the Chaplain Candidate. Chaplain Candidates wear a similar insignia consisting of an open book, two laurel branches crossed at the stems with a shepherd's crook. Chaplain Candidates were transitioned from the Staff Specialist Branch to the Chaplain Branch which left the candidates without an authorized branch insignia. The Chief of Chaplains submitted a request for collar insignia which was approved by HQDA, G-1 on 23 February 2012. The design for the collar insignia was authorized on 18 June 2012.
