= Health Professions Scholarship Program =

US military scholarship program

- Abbreviation: HPSP
- Formation: 1972
- Purpose: Educational financial assistance in exchange for military service
- Fields: Medicine (MD/DO), dentistry, nursing, optometry, counseling and clinical psychology, pharmacy, and veterinary medicine.
- Parent organization: U.S. Army; U.S. Navy; U.S. Air Force
- Website: Army; Navy; Air Force

The F. Edward Hébert Armed Forces Health Professions Scholarship Program (HPSP) offers prospective military physicians (M.D. or D.O.), dentists, nurses, optometrists, psychologists, pharmacists, and veterinarians a paid professional education in exchange for service as a commissioned non-line or special branch officer. Programs are available in the United States Army, the United States Navy, and the United States Air Force.

== Program details ==
Created under the authority of the Uniformed Services Health Professions Revitalization Act of 1972, the HPSP is the primary source of trained healthcare professionals entering the United States Armed Forces. It is named after Felix Edward Hébert, the longest serving US representative from Louisiana and founder of the Uniformed Services University of the Health Sciences. Subject to eligibility for a commission (such as US citizenship, physical and academic qualifications, etc.), scholarship recipients are commissioned to the grade of O1 as second lieutenants in the US Army Reserve or the US Air Force Reserve, or ensigns in the US Navy Reserve. The selectees are then placed in the Individual Ready (Inactive Ready) Reserve during their professional training.

Prospective students compete for scholarships that cover some or all of their education. One- to four-year scholarships are offered based on branch of service and profession. While on scholarship, the financial expenses of tuition, certain academic fees, a monthly taxable stipend of ~$2,500, mandatory books and equipment, certain licensing exam fees (e.g., the USMLE Step 1), and a laptop rental are paid by the student's sponsoring service. A $20,000 taxable signing bonus is also offered by each branch.

As inactive reserve officers, the students are required to serve 45 days of active duty for training (ADT) each fiscal year. While on active duty, they receive the same rights, privileges, and pay, and are subject to the Uniform Code of Military Justice, as any other active duty officer. For the first two years of training, this duty is sometimes spent attending an officer basic course/school (Army OCS, Air Force OTS, or Navy OCS), undergoing initial flight surgeon or other military medical specialty training, or executing "School Orders" (participating in clinical training) at the student's university. For the 3rd and 4th years, the student will often carry out elective clinical rotations at a military facility. Time spent in HPSP may count towards the 20 years required for a reserve retirement if the member participates in the selected reserve after separating from active duty, and is credited back on a one-for-one selected reserve/HPSP year basis. No HPSP time (active duty or not) counts towards an active duty 20-year retirement. Time spent in active duty military residencies, however, counts toward active duty retirement.

Upon graduation, the students are promoted to the grade of O3, corresponding to the rank of captain in the Army and Air Force or lieutenant in the Navy; medical school graduates may be placed on active duty if matched for residency at a military facility. Clinical psychology doctoral students have a similar arrangement for their one-year internship.

== Medical residencies ==
In general, Army and Air Force medical residents are allowed to complete their residencies before proceeding to their first assignments, while Navy personnel complete an internship and then serve as a general medical officer (GMO), with the option of completing a residency following their GMO tour. Fourth-year medical students must apply to active duty military residencies in addition to civilian residencies and are required to accept active duty positions if they are offered. While wages for military residents are higher than for their civilian counterparts, a military residency requires the resident to fulfill further service obligations which are generally paid back year-for-year with their medical school obligation, concurrently, after completion of residency. Certain residencies may require the service time owed from medical school and residency to be paid back consecutively, i.e., back-to-back instead of at the same time.

Scholarship recipients also may choose to complete either a civilian sponsored residency or a civilian deferred residency. A sponsored residency is a civilian residency in which the resident is on active duty status and is financially supported by their branch of service. Years spent in residency count towards the 20-year active duty retirement requirement, and incur a one-for-one service commitment. A deferred residency is just like a normal civilian residency. There is no financial support from the resident's branch of service, but no time is owed for the residency either. HPSP time from medical school, however, is still owed due upon completion of the residency. Additionally, years spent in a deferred residency do not count toward retirement, but do count toward rank and grade.

The incurred service obligation is generally one-for-one for every service-paid year of schooling, with a minimum of two years for physicians and three years for other specialties. Active duty and civilian-sponsored residencies also incur a one-for-one obligation. This means a recipient owes extra time if their postgraduate program is longer than the length of their initial professional education, e.g., a four-year medical student recipient in a seven-year neurosurgery residency would owe three extra years beyond their four-year medical school obligation, as the obligations for both medical school and residency are concurrently paid back after completion of residency. This results in seven total years of active duty service following residency.

For Navy officers, time spent as a GMO is credited towards the service obligation. However, physicians that serve time as a GMO or flight surgeon prior to residency (after internship) will incur additional commitment of one-for-one if they complete subsequent military residency training. This usually results in a longer service commitment than if they entered residency directly. Longer initial commitments have a significant negative financial impact; medical officers may take certain multi-year bonuses (which may equal up to 40% of total pay) which will run consecutively with initial residency and certain other commitments, resulting in substantial lost income if residency commitment payback is delayed due to GMO/flight medicine tour or sponsored fellowship/residency.

== Other branches ==
HPSP scholarships are not offered by the United States Marine Corps since it receives medical services from the Navy. Likewise, the United States Space Force receives its medical services from the Air Force. The United States Coast Guard currently receives its medical services from the United States Public Health Service Commissioned Corps, though plans exist to train its own physicians and enlisted medical staff starting in the 2023 academic year.

== See also ==
- Uniformed Services University of the Health Sciences
