= National Audit Office of Finland =

Financial oversight body in Finland

National Audit Office (NAO)
- Valtiontalouden tarkastusvirasto (VTV) (Finnish), Statens revisionsverk (SRV) (Swedish)

Agency overview
- Formed: 1948
- Jurisdiction: Finland
- Headquarters: Helsinki
- Employees: 151 (2023)
- Annual budget: €17.1 million (2023)
- Agency executive: Sami Yläoutinen, Auditor General
- Website: vtv.fi

National Audit Office of Finland (abbreviated NAOF, Finnish: Valtiontalouden tarkastusvirasto (VTV); Swedish: Statens revisionsverk oversees the management of public finances in Finland and monitors fiscal policies and oversees election campaign and party funding. It operates as the supreme external auditor in connection with the Parliament. Independent audit work ensures that state funds are used in accordance with the decisions of the Parliament, lawfully and effectively. The tasks of the NAO are defined in the Finnish Constitution and in the Act on the National Audit Office of Finland.

The Parliament appoints the Auditor General of the National Audit Office for a term of six years. Since January 2022, the Auditor General has been Sami Yläoutinen. At the end of 2023, the NAOF had 151 employees. The main office of the agency is located in Helsinki, with another office in Oulu. The office premises in Helsinki have been located in Ruoholahti since 2017 at Porkkalankatu 1.

The National Audit Office's area of operation includes the Government and ministries, state agencies and institutions, funds outside the state budget, state-owned enterprises and state-controlled companies, wellbeing services counties for the part of state funding, government grants and subsidies to municipalities, businesses, and other organizations, as well as transfers between Finland and the European Union. The National Audit Office does not audit the finances of the Parliament, funds under the responsibility of the Parliament, the Financial Supervisory Authority, or the Bank of Finland.

== History ==
During the Swedish rule in Finland, a governmental agency named Kamarirevisio was established in 1695 to oversee the Crown's financial administration. Its name was changed to Kamarioikeus in 1799. At the beginning of the autonomy of Finland, supervision of state taxation and auditing belonged to the Senate's Chamber Office, which established the revisiokonttori for this purpose. By the Senate's regulation, an independent agency named Yleinen revisionioikeus was established on December 16, 1824, which included the revisiokonttori. The agency was led by a commissioner. Its task was to audit the state accounts, and the role of the court was to handle any detected abuses and to bring possible charges. The revisionioikeus was eventually transferred from the Chamber Office to the State Treasury Office.

The name of the agency was shortened by a new regulation issued on December 29, 1923, to Yleinen revisionilaitos. The revision court continued under its authority until it was replaced in 1931 by a board of revision.

The Act on the Audit of State Finances was passed on December 23, 1947, and the National Audit Office began its operations the following year. According to the law, the National Audit Office was tasked with auditing the legality and appropriateness of state financial management and overseeing compliance with the budget, which remain its main tasks to this day. The general accounting of the state and the preparation of the state financial statements were transferred to the State Treasury by a regulation issued on April 14, 1965. The tasks of the NAO were expanded in 1993 to include the supervision of the State Guarantee Fund and, along with it, bank support, and in 1995 the supervision of financial transfers between Finland and the European Union. Since 2001, the National Audit Office has operated as an independent agency under the Parliament, separate from the Ministry of Finance, as the Constitution, which entered into force in 2000, required the agency to be functionally independent. The oversight of political party funding was transferred from the Ministry of Justice to the NAOF from the beginning of 2016. The NAOF was responsible for monitoring fiscal policy between 2013 and 2025. The NAOF has also been responsible for the oversight of the Finnish Transparency Register starting from 2024 and for the oversight of political advertising starting from 2026.

The Parliamentary Ombudsman issued a reprimand in December 2020 to the Auditor General of the NAOF, Tytti Yli-Viikari, and to the Director in charge of the NAOF’s legal affairs, Mikko Koiranen. The reprimand concerned the fact that Yli-Viikari and Koiranen had concluded an agreement in the spring of 2016, whereby a senior auditor at the NAOF was paid full salary without any work obligation for the second half of 2016 and half salary from the beginning of 2017 to the end of July 2018.

== Organization ==
The National Audit Office is led by the Auditor General, elected by the Parliament for a six-year term. The Auditor General approves the audit and oversight plan and decides on the reports and audit instructions to be submitted to the Parliament.

- The National Audit Office consists of three units: the Audit Unit, the Oversight Unit, and the Shared Services Unit.
- The Audit Unit is responsible for conducting financial, performance, and compliance audits. The unit is led by Jaakko Eskola.
- The Oversight Unit is responsible for overseeing political party and election funding, overseeing political advertising, maintaining the Finnish Transparency register, handling complaints and reports of misconduct, and conducting financial policy audits. The unit is led by Matti Okko.
- The Shared Services Unit provides personnel, financial, and information technology services, communication, office facilities, case management, and other common services of the agency. The unit is led by Tuula Sandholm.
