= United States Army Audit Agency =

Agency providing auditing services to the United States Army

The U.S. Army Audit Agency (USAAA) provides objective and independent auditing services to the United States Army.

At the request of the Under Secretary of War, the Army Audit Agency was established on 12 November 1946 with the issuance of General Order No. 135. The Agency was placed under the jurisdiction of the Chief of Finance and tasked with maintaining appropriation and fund accounting, maintaining military property accountability, and auditing the accounts of the American Red Cross.

With implementation of the DOD Reorganization Act of 1986, the Agency was placed under the sole jurisdiction of the Secretary of the Army. Subsequent General Orders made the Army Auditor General responsible for internal audit services throughout the Department of the Army, including audit policy, training, follow-up, and liaison with external audit organizations.

The Army Auditor General, the Principal Deputy Auditor General, and three Deputy Auditors General, each of whom is in charge of specific aspects of agency operations – Acquisitions and Logistics Audits; Forces and Infrastructure Audits; and Financial Management, Digital Information, and Security Audits, lead the U.S. Army Audit Agency.

The Agency Headquarters is located at Fort Belvoir, Virginia. The Agency has worldwide operations with over a dozen offices in the continental United States and three outside the continental United States (Germany, Hawaii, and the Republic of Korea).

In 1994, the agency was selected to be a Government Performance and Results Act pilot agency. The Partnership for Public Service has recognized the agency as a Best Place to Work.

The Agency is authorized over 400 civilian personnel. For the most part, audit divisions are functionally aligned, but two teams have a geographic focus: (i) Theater Operations, Europe and Southwest Asia and (ii) Theater Operations, Pacific.
