= Comptroller =

Accounting supervisor or auditor

A comptroller (pronounced either the same as controller or as /kəmpˈtroʊlər/) is a management-level position responsible for supervising the quality of accounting and financial reporting of an organization. A financial comptroller is a senior-level executive who acts as the head of accounting, and oversees the preparation of financial reports, such as balance sheets and income statements.

In most Commonwealth countries, the comptroller general, auditor general, or comptroller and auditor general is the external auditor of the budget execution of the government and of government-owned companies. Typically, the independent institution headed by the comptroller general is a member of the International Organization of Supreme Audit Institutions. In American government, the comptroller is effectively the chief financial officer of a public body.

In business management, the comptroller is closer to a chief audit executive, holding a senior role in internal audit functions. Generally, the title encompasses a variety of responsibilities, from overseeing accounting and monitoring internal controls to countersigning on expenses and commitments.

== Etymology ==
The word is a variant of "controller". The "cont-" or "count-" part in that word was associated with "compt-", a variant of the verb "count". The term, though criticized by lexicographers such as Henry Watson Fowler, is probably retained in part because in official titles it was deemed useful to have the title dissociated from the word and concept "control".

A variant explanation is that comptroller evolved in the 15th century through a blend of the French compte ("an account") and the Middle English countreroller (someone who checks a copy of a scroll, from the French contreroule "counter-roll, scroll copy"), thus creating a title for a compteroller who specializes in checking financial ledgers. This etymology explains why the name is often pronounced identically to "controller" despite the distinct spelling. However, comptroller is sometimes pronounced phonetically by those unaware of the word's origins or who wish specifically to avoid confusion with "controller".

== Business role ==
In business, the comptroller is the person who, independently from the chief financial officer in some countries, oversees accounting, and the implementation and monitoring of internal controls. In countries such as the United States, the United Kingdom, Australia, New Zealand, Israel, and Canada, a comptroller or financial comptroller reports to the CFO in companies that have one.

Businesses typically use the spelling controller, while government organizations use comptroller.

== Government role ==
=== India ===
In India, Comptroller is an appointment.

- The Comptroller and Auditor General of India is the authority which audits all receipts and expenditure of the Government of India and the state governments, including those of bodies and authorities substantially financed by the government.
- The Comptroller of the President's Household is responsible for the President of India's Household at the Rashtrapati Bhavan. The post is held by a Naval officer of the rank of Captain.
- There are officers called Comptroller of the Governor's household in each state who are responsible for the Governor's households at the Raj Bhavans of each of the states and union territories of India.

=== Mexico ===
In Mexico, the comptroller, translated as 'contralor', was established in the public administration during the presidency of Miguel de la Madrid, when he created the Secretariat of the General Comptroller of the Federation in 1982. This ministry was renamed as the Secretariat of the Civil Service by president Vicente Fox in 2003. Nevertheless, several states still name as General Comptroller Office their audit and oversight institutions. Namely, Mexico City has the Secretariat of the General Comptroller of Mexico City and Jalisco has the Comptroller General Office of the State of Jalisco.

=== United Kingdom ===
The title of comptroller is used in the Royal Household for various offices, including:

- the Comptroller of the Household (nowadays a sinecure, invariably held by a government whip in the House of Commons). The office was established as part of the Wardrobe (a powerful department of household and state) in the 13th century, in order to maintain a check on the accounts of the Treasurer of the Household. Today, the Comptroller's duties outside of government are minimal and mainly ceremonial.
- the Comptroller of the Lord Chamberlain's Office, who is a full-time member of the Royal Household; his duties are concerned with the arrangement of ceremonial affairs rather than financial affairs.

The Comptroller of the Navy is a post in the Royal Navy responsible for procurement and matériel.

The Comptroller and City Solicitor is one of the High Officers of the City of London Corporation, responsible for provision of all legal services. The post of comptroller dates from 1311, and that of City Solicitor from 1544; the two were amalgamated in 1945.

The Comptroller General of Patents, Designs and Trade Marks is the head of the UK Intellectual Property Office or Patent Office.

The Comptroller and Auditor General is head of the National Audit Office, and is the successor of the former Comptroller General of the Exchequer and the former Commissioners of Audit.

=== United States ===
The title of comptroller is held by various government officials.

- The Comptroller General is the director of the Government Accountability Office (GAO), an agency founded in 1921 (as General Accounting Office) to ensure the accountability of the federal government.
- Banks are supervised by the Office of the Comptroller of the Currency, an officer within the federal Department of The Treasury.
- Several states and local governments (cities, counties, etc.) have comptrollers, variously elected or appointed, with widely varying powers over budgetary and management matters. (See Connecticut Comptroller, Florida Comptroller, Illinois Comptroller, Comptroller of Maryland, State Comptroller of New Jersey, New York State Comptroller, Texas Comptroller of Public Accounts; New York City Comptroller.) In many US states, the equivalent office is titled state auditor.

=== Spain ===
In Spain, the word comptroller is translated as "Interventor".

- The Comptroller General is the head of the Office of the Comptroller General of the State Administration (IGAE), an agency founded in 1874 to ensure the accountability of the Spanish administration.
- All the government departments and agencies have a unit of the IGAE, with a comptroller as its head.
- The Armed Forces and the Social Security are supervised by the Comptroller General of the Defence and the Comptroller General of the Social Security, respectively.
- Since 2007, the Royal Household has an auditor known as the Comptroller of the Royal Household of His Majesty the King.
- All the regions and local administrations possesses comptrollers.

== See also ==
- Comptroller of the Household
- State Comptroller (disambiguation)
