= Flight officer =

Former military rank

The title flight officer was a military rank used by the United States Army Air Forces during World War II, and also an air force rank in several Commonwealth countries, where it was used for female officers and was equivalent to the rank of flight lieutenant. The term flight officer is sometimes used today to describe job title positions as aircrew members.

== Aircrew function ==
A flight officer is a member of the aircrew of an aircraft who is responsible for specific functions. The flight officer may function as the navigator, responsible for planning the journey, advising the pilot while en route, and ensuring that hazards or obstacles are avoided. The flight officer may also be responsible for operating aircraft mission/weapon systems, including mission planning, mission timing, threat reactions, aircraft communications, and hazard avoidance. In the United States Navy and Marine Corps and formerly United States Coast Guard, officer aircrew members responsible for operating airborne weapon and sensor systems are called naval flight officers. The title of flight officer is also used for police officers who serve as pilots in law enforcement aviation units.

== Military rank ==
=== United States ===
==== United States Army ====
U.S. Army Air Forces Flight officer rank insignia as used during World War II.

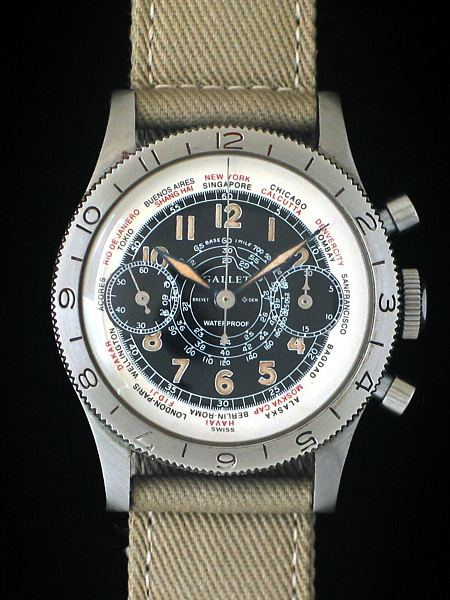
The Gallet Flight Officer Chronograph (1939), commissioned by Harry S Truman's senatorial staff for issue to flight officers and pilots of the US Army Air Forces during WWII.

Flight officer was a United States Army Air Forces rank used during World War II, from 1942 to 1945; the rank being created on 10 September 1942. On 5 November 1942 military glider pilots were commissioned as flight officers after the completion of their training. The new rank insignia was nicknamed "the blue pickle."

The rank is equivalent to Warrant Officer Junior Grade (WOJG) which is today's Warrant Officer (NATO grade: W-1). Enlisted and aviation cadet trainees who successfully passed air qualification training were appointed as Flight Officers and served as rated pilots, navigators, flight engineers, bombardiers and glider pilots. At the end of World War II, the Army Air Forces discontinued the use of the rank of flight officer. By then, all of the service's flight officers had either been promoted to commissioned officer ranks during the course of the war or discharged.

In the late 1940s, following the creation of the separate United States Air Force in 1947, the United States Army required more pilots. However, congressionally-imposed commissioned officer strength levels prevented pilot expansion. The Army requested authority to establish the flight officer/warrant officer program. This proposal was rejected because the Army already had three groups of personnel – enlisted, warrant officer, and commissioned officer. As a fallback position, the United States Department of the Army decided that the grade of flight officer was in reality a warrant officer grade with a restriction to the warrant officer junior grade rank (WOJG).

The Warrant Officer Flight Program began in 1949 and the first warrant officer Army Aviators graduated from it in 1951. The program was suspended in 1959 but reestablished in 1963, and as of January 2022 it has been in continuous operation ever since. Most of the warrant officers were initially trained to fly helicopters; the Army had begun a helicopter pilot training course for officers in 1948. Flight warrant officer candidates had to be between the ages of 18 and 28 when they began training, though they could begin training at age 17 if they were about to have their 18th birthday.

From 1947 until creation of the United States Army Aviation Branch in 1983, Army commissioned officers rated as "Army Aviators" remained commissioned in their Army "basic branch," which included "armor," "Corps of Engineers," "infantry," "field artillery," "Medical Service Corps," "Military Intelligence Corps," and "Transportation Corps," and continued to wear that branch's insignia while assigned to aviation units, generally alternating between aviation assignments and "basic branch" assignments in successive tours of duty. Army Aviation warrant officers rated as Army Aviators wore the generic "Army Warrant Officer Branch" insignia (except for certain warrant officers assigned to "air cavalry" units, who like commissioned officers assigned to "cavalry" units, were authorized to wear "cavalry" insignia, while assigned to cavalry units), but were administratively managed by the Army "Warrant Officer Aviation Branch" in the Army Personnel Center, and, as today, continued to serve in successive aviation assignment tours.

Army Aviators, both commissioned and warrant officers, piloted Army aircraft (both rotary-wing and fixed-wing) and performed missions including: artillery spotting, tactical observation, scouting, and reconnaissance, and casualty evacuation roles, as well as battlefield troop lift, cargo transport, armed/attack helicopter, electronic surveillance, and communications/electronic warfare missions. Under the provisions of the Key West Agreement of 1948, the Pace-Finletter MOU 1952, and the Johnson-McConnell agreement of 1966, the Army agreed with the Air Force that the Air Force would (1) provide all fixed-wing close air support for the Army, (2) permit the Army unlimited use of helicopters, (3) limit the Army's weight limit on fixed-wing aircraft, (4) provide most Army fixed-wing tactical airlift support, and (5) relinquish claims to most types of tactical helicopters.

==== Civil Air Patrol ====
The rank of flight officer was re-instituted by the United States Air Force's civilian auxiliary, the Civil Air Patrol (CAP), in the mid-1980s, replacing the former ranks of warrant officer and chief warrant officer, new entrants for which had been eliminated by the Air Force in 1959 and discontinued with the retirement of the last Air Force chief warrant officer in the United States Air Force Reserve in 1992. CAP officers between the ages of 18 and 20 are eligible for promotion to the ranks of flight officer, technical flight officer and senior flight officer. Requirements for promotion to each grade generally are the same as for promotion to CAP second lieutenant, first lieutenant, and captain, respectively, and those flight officers who choose to enter the commissioned ranks are promoted to these respective ranks when they reach the age of 21.

Civil Air Patrol rank insignia of a senior flight officer.

Civil Air Patrol rank insignia of a technical flight officer.

Civil Air Patrol rank insignia of a flight officer.

=== Commonwealth countries ===
Flight officer was established as a rank equivalent to flight lieutenant in the women's air services of several Commonwealth countries. The rank was used by the United Kingdom′s Women's Auxiliary Air Force (WAAF) and its successor, the Women's Royal Air Force (WRAF), until 1968, and by Princess Mary's Royal Air Force Nursing Service (PMRAFNS) until 1980. It was also used in the Women's Royal Australian Air Force before it was absorbed into the Royal Australian Air Force in 1977.

== See also ==
- Aircrew (Flight crew)
