= United States Army Aviation Branch =

Aviation branch of the U.S. army

Aviation Branch
- Branch plaque
- Active: 12 April 1983 – present
- Country: United States
- Branch: US Army
- Type: Army aviation
- Garrison/HQ: Fort Rucker, Alabama
- Nickname: Army Aviation
- Motto: Above the Best
- Colors: Ultramarine Blue, Golden orange
- Anniversaries: 12 April 1983

Commanders
- Commanding General: Major General Clair A. Gill
- Deputy Commanding General: Brigadier General Kenneth C. Cole
- Command Sergeant Major: Command Sergeant Major Kirk R. Coley

Insignia
- Branch insignia

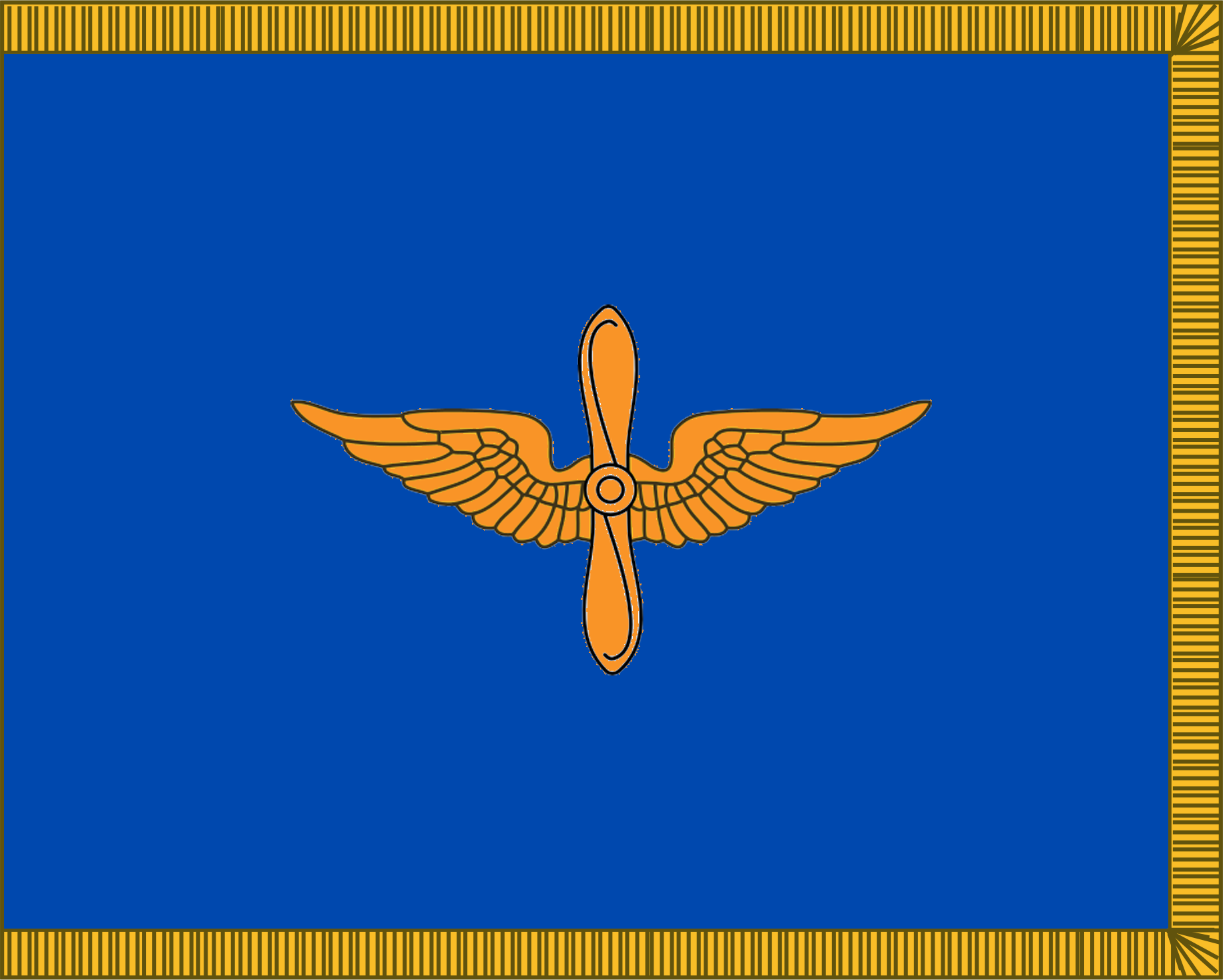
- US Army Aviation Branch Flag

Aircraft flown
- Attack helicopter: AH-64
- Cargo helicopter: CH-47
- Multirole helicopter: MH-6, MH-60
- Trainer helicopter: UH-72 TH-66
- Utility helicopter: UH-60, UH-72
- Reconnaissance: MQ-1C, RQ-5, RQ-7, RQ-11, TO-5
- Transport: C-12, C-20, C-26, UC-35, C-37

The United States Army Aviation Branch is the aviation branch of the United States Army and the administrative organization that is responsible for doctrine, manning and configuration for all army aviation units. This branch was formerly considered to be one of the combat arms branches, but is today included within the "Maneuver, Fires and Effects" (MFE) classification, in accordance with current U.S. Army organizational doctrine.

After the United States Army Air Corps grew into the Army Air Forces and split into the new service, the United States Air Force, the Army was left with its sole fixed-wing aviation units flying Taylorcraft L-2 Grasshopper observation planes for artillery units. The Army would develop a new concept of aviation using the helicopter that would show promise during the Korean War and would revolutionize warfare during the Vietnam War.

== History ==
=== Origins of Army Aviation ===
Army Aviation traces its origins back to the American Civil War. Both Union and Confederate forces used hydrogen-filled balloons to direct artillery fire, marking the beginning of U.S. military aeronautics and of aerial support of Army ground forces. The Army also used balloons during the Spanish–American War and World War I, but airplanes replaced balloons for most military purposes during the latter conflict.

While not part of the present Army Aviation Branch's heritage, United States military aviation began in 1907 with the Signal Corps Aeronautical Division and its acquisition of its first heavier-than-air aircraft, an airplane built to Army specifications by the Wright brothers. During World War I, the Air Service's aircraft strength grew from a few dozen to more than 11,000 planes, and the number of aviation personnel came to total more than 190,000. The Army Air Service was created with the disestablishment of the Signal Corps Aviation Section in May 1918. After World War I, General William Mitchell and other Air Service leaders spoke out forcefully in favor of an independent air force. Since they envisioned aviation as a separate striking force, capable of independent operations, they opposed its remaining a supporting arm of the ground forces. Although Congress, as well as most Army leaders, rejected Mitchell's argument, the Air Service did become a separate combat arm, equal in status to the infantry, cavalry, and artillery. In 1926, the name of the air arm was changed to Army Air Corps, and then, in June 1941, the Air Corps and other Army air elements were merged to form the Army Air Forces, co-equal with the Army Ground Forces and the Army Service Forces.

During the 1930s, many Army Air Corps leaders began to experiment with strategic air operations. Like Billy Mitchell before them, they advocated using air power independently of the Army ground forces to destroy enemy targets behind the lines of combat. This Air Corps emphasis on strategic operations disturbed some ground forces leaders, who believed their aerial support needs were being neglected. Aerial support was particularly vital for artillery fire adjustment. Partly because Air Corps fire support aircraft were not always available, the chief of field artillery and other artillery officers became interested in using light aircraft organic to the artillery units. The Army experimented with using small organic aircraft for artillery fire adjustment and other functions in maneuvers at Camp Beauregard, La., in August 1940. The tests were repeated on a larger scale in the Army maneuvers in Louisiana, Tennessee, Texas, and the Carolinas in 1941.

=== Birth of Army Aviation (1942) ===
Following a final series of experiments with organic Army spotter aircraft conducted in 1942, the Secretary of War ordered the establishment of organic air observation for field artillery—hence the birth of modern Army Aviation—on 6 June 1942. It was this new World War II-era phenomenon with its few small single-engine spotter planes, organic Army Aviation, that eventually evolved into today's Army Aviation Branch.

Organic Army Aviation first entered into combat in November 1942 on the coast of North Africa. During World War II, Piper L-4 Grasshoppers and a few larger Stinson L-5 Sentinels were used to adjust artillery fire, gather intelligence, support naval bombardment, direct bombing missions, and perform other functions. Most training of both pilots and mechanics was conducted by the Department of Air Training within the Field Artillery School at Post Field, Okla., although the Army Air Forces conducted some primary training of organic Army Aviation personnel.

After the creation of the Army Air Forces, the Army Ground Forces retained the use of light aircraft for artillery forward observation and reconnaissance in June 1942. First use of the helicopter in combat is credited to the USAAF 1st Air Commando Group in Burma in 1943. The 1ACG operated six Sikorsky R-4 helicopters primarily for air rescue and medical evacuation.

When the United States Air Force was established as a separate service in 1947, the Army developed its light planes and rotary wing aircraft to support its ground operations. The Korean War and Vietnam War proved the growing capabilities of these aviation assets to perform a variety of missions not covered by the Air Force.

The Korean War provided new challenges and opportunities for Army Aviation. Organic Army Aviation had acquired its first helicopters, thirteen Bell H-13 Sioux, in 1947, shortly before the U.S. Air Force became independent of the Army. In Korea, the Army employed the Cessna O-1 Bird Dog and other improved fixed wing planes, but also helicopters. The Army used its H-13s primarily for medical evacuation, command and control, and transport of lightweight and valuable cargo. Because of the rugged terrain of the Korean peninsula, the value of helicopters came to be recognized by all the services; the demand for both helicopters and trained aviators consistently exceeded the supply. In 1951 the Army began organizing five helicopter transport companies and training warrant officer pilots. There was, however, an ongoing rivalry between the Army and the Air Force concerning responsibility and resources for the aerial support of ground forces. Because of this rivalry, and also because of the shortage of helicopters, only two Army transport companies were supplied with Sikorsky H-19 Chickasaw helicopters in time to participate in the Korean War. Transport helicopters nevertheless proved themselves by moving cargo and personnel during the final months of the war and then by participating in prisoner exchanges and other functions after the cessation of hostilities. During the Korean War, the Department of Air Training at Post Field expanded, and in early 1953, it became the Army Aviation School. As a result of the expansion of both aviation and artillery training, Post Field became overcrowded, and the Army decided to move the Army Aviation School to a different post. When no satisfactory permanent Army post was found, a temporary post, Camp Rucker, Ala., was chosen.

The first armed helicopter company was activated in Okinawa in 1962. It was deployed to Thailand and then to Vietnam, where it flew escort for lift helicopters. The Department of Defense did not abolish mission restrictions on the Army's rotary-wing aircraft, thereby technically authorizing the Army to arm helicopters until 1966. The "Howze Board," or "Tactical Mobility Requirements Board," was established in 1962 to develop and test the concept of air mobility. After test exercises, war games, and concentrated study and analysis, the Howze Board recommended that the Army commit itself to organic air mobility – later known as air assault. The Howze Board recommended the extensive use of helicopters to transport infantry troops, artillery, and supplies, as well as to provide local aerial fire support. These recommendations were tested by the 11th Air Assault Division (Test) from 1963 to 1965. In 1965, the 1st Cavalry Division (Airmobile) was organized and sent to Vietnam, where it repeatedly demonstrated the validity of the airmobile concept in actual combat.

The creation, implementation, and consolidation of the Army Aviation Branch dominated the 1980s. Prominent aviators, as well as other Army leaders, had debated the establishment of Aviation as a separate branch since the time of the Korean War. The opposition to a separate aviation branch had resulted in part from Army attitudes regarding the Army Air Corps and the U.S. Air Force. In Army circles, both of these aviation organizations were believed to have been unreliable in performing their mission of supporting the ground forces—even after having been given resources to do so. Since Army Aviation had demonstrated its commitment to the support of the ground battle in Vietnam, however, opposition to a separate aviation branch began to wane. Also, Army Aviation had grown in size and technological sophistication. This growth caused increasingly complex problems in training, procurement, doctrine development, proponent responsibility, and personnel management. Many non-aviators as well as aviators became convinced that these problems could be solved more effectively by the creation of an aviation branch.

=== "America’s Helicopter War" began in Vietnam (1961) ===
Both Army Aviation and the helicopter came of age during the conflict in Southeast Asia. The most widely used helicopter, the Bell UH-1 Iroquois, or Huey, began to arrive in Vietnam in significant numbers in 1964. Before the end of the conflict, more than 5,000 of these versatile aircraft were introduced into Southeast Asia. They were used for medical evacuation, command and control, air assault; personnel and materiel transport; and gunships. The AH-1 Cobra arrived in 1967 to partially replace the Huey in its gun ship capacity. Other important helicopters in Vietnam included the Boeing CH-47 Chinook, the Hughes OH-6 Cayuse, the Bell OH-58 Kiowa, and the Sikorsky CH-54 Tarhe. Although the concept of air mobility had been developed with a mid-intensity European conflict in mind, Army Aviation and the helicopter had proven themselves during the low intensity conflict in Southeast Asia.

Under the Johnson-McConnell agreement of 1966, the Army agreed to limit its fixed-wing aviation role to administrative mission support (light unarmed aircraft of civilian design).

Afterwards, the Army turned its major attention back to the threat of a mid or high intensity conflict in Europe, and doubts reemerged about the value of helicopters in that sort of arena. Some military leaders believed that the helicopter could not survive and perform an essential role in a heavy combat environment. To gain general acceptance and ensure further success, Army Aviation continued to develop new doctrine, tactics, aircraft, equipment, and organizational structure. New or radically modified aircraft were adopted from the late 1970s into the mid-1980s. These included the Sikorsky UH-60 Black Hawk, Boeing AH-64 Apache, D-model of the CH-47 Chinook, and OH-58D version of the Kiowa.

=== Birth of Army Aviation Branch (April 1983) ===
Both Department of the Army and U.S. Army Training and Doctrine Command conducted extensive studies of the separate-branch question during the 1970s through 1982. In 1982, Jack V. Mackmull, the commander of the XVIII Airborne Corps, participated in the Army Aviation Review study project as chairman of the Tactical Employment Committee. The committee's report and recommendations included a future requirement for a helicopter that could engage in air-to-air combat and recommended establishment of the Army Aviation Branch. The Secretary of the Army approved that recommendation on 12 April 1983 - the date celebrated as the Branch's birthday. Aviation Officer Basic and Advanced Courses began at Fort Novosel - then Fort Rucker - in 1984, and a gradual consolidation of aviation-related activities followed. In 1986, the U.S. Army Air Traffic Control Activity became part of the branch. In the following year, a Noncommissioned Officers Academy was established at Fort Rucker. In 1988, the Army Aviation Logistics School, which had been dependent on the Transportation Center at Fort Eustis, was incorporated into the Aviation Branch.

Also in 1988, the Army Aviation Modernization Plan was given final approval and implemented. The modernization plan called for a gradual reduction in the number of Army aircraft as older models were replaced by modern ones. Aircraft that appeared during the late 1980s and early 1990s included the armed Bell OH-58 Kiowa Warrior and the new TH-67 Creek training helicopter, along with the Cessna Citation V and Beechcraft C-12 Huron fixed-wing aircraft.

Army Aviation's role of providing the indispensable vertical dimension to the modern battlefield has become universally recognized. For example, during operations in Grenada, Panama, and the Persian Gulf region, Army Aviation played major and decisive roles. One of the first blows of Operation Desert Storm was struck by Army Aviation. Apache helicopters destroyed key Iraqi early warning radar sites and thus opened the air corridors to Baghdad for the bombing campaign that preceded the ground war. Then during the 100 hours of ground combat, Army helicopters dominated nighttime operations.

The decreased military budgets following the end of the Cold War forced both the Army and Army Aviation to downsize. Army Aviation's response was to develop the "Aviation Restructure Initiative", a plan to decrease the size of the force while continuing to provide a capable, ready force. By the late 1990s, continuing deficiencies and unintended results of the ARI led to a series of aviation plans as key pieces of the Army-wide modernization and transformation. In 2003, the Aviation Branch assumed overall responsibility for unmanned aerial vehicles within the Army. Operations since Desert Storm showed the versatility and flexibility of Army Aviation. Examples were uses of AH-64 Apaches in peacekeeping operations in the Balkans as a deterrent to mobs threatening fellow citizens or paramilitary groups trying to remove weapons from agreed cantonments. The beginning of the Global War on Terrorism in 2001 drew Army Aviation again into ongoing combat. Events in Afghanistan and Iraq have reaffirmed the qualities that caused the creation of Organic Army Aviation in 1942.

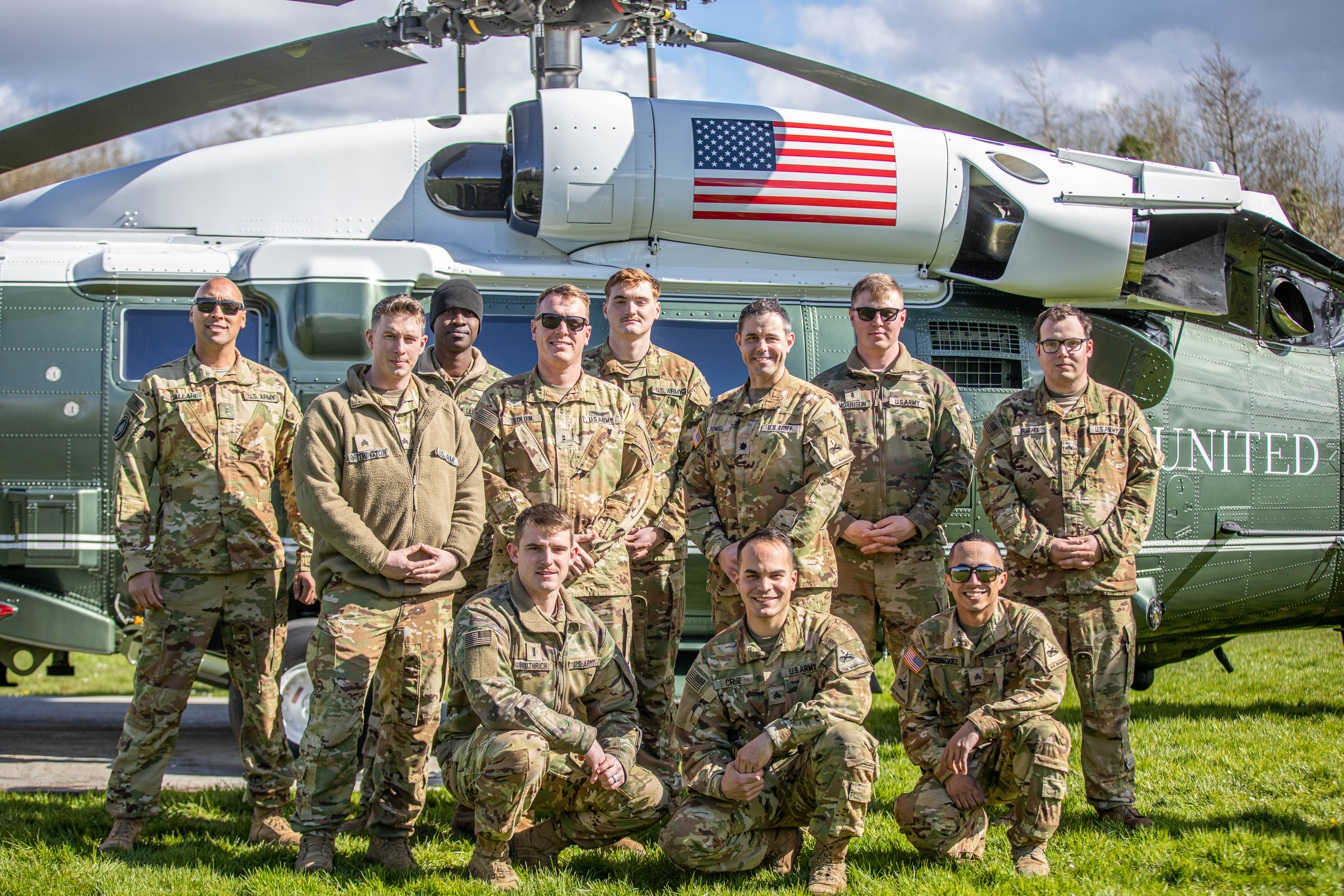
2-501 AR crew in front of Marine-1, April 2023

On 28 April 2023, Army Chief of Staff James C. McConville ordered all pilots, except those participating in critical missions, to undergo extra training after two deadly accidents involving Army helicopters, killing 12 soldiers.

== Mission ==
The mission of Army Aviation is to find, fix, and destroy the enemy through fire and maneuver; and to provide combat, combat support and combat service support in coordinated operations as an integral member of the combined arms team. On the modern battlefield, Army Aviation, unlike the other members of the combined arms team, has the organic flexibility, versatility, and assets to fulfill a variety of maneuver, CS, CSS, roles and functions. These cover the spectrum of combined arms operations. Aviation can accomplish each of these roles—within the limits of finite assets and capabilities—during offensive or defensive operations and also for joint, combined, contingency, or special operations.

== Organization ==
Originally aircraft and pilots were assigned directly to artillery or other units requiring light aircraft. In 1957 the Army decided to create individual company sized units in the numbered divisions. These companies were soon expanded to battalion size during the Vietnam war and further expanded in the late 1980s to regimental-sized support elements under a brigade headquarters. (Combat Aviation Brigade)

== Heraldry ==
- Branch Insignia:
  A silver propeller in a vertical position between two gold wings in a horizontal position, 1 1/8 inches in width. The wings are modified and differ from designs currently used on Army and Air Force aviator badges. The insignia draws upon the original insignia for historical and symbolic purposes, but was deliberately modified to signify a new chapter in Army aviation history.
- Branch Plaque:
  The plaque design has the branch insignia in proper colors (gold wings with silver propeller). The letters are golden orange and the rim is gold. The background is ultramarine blue.
- Regimental Insignia:
  Personnel assigned to the Aviation branch affiliate with a specific regiment and wear the insignia of the affiliated regiment.
- Regimental Coat of Arms:
  There is no standard aviation regimental flag to represent all of the aviation regiments. Each regiment of aviation has its own coat of arms which appears on the breast of a displayed eagle. The background of all the aviation regimental flags is ultramarine blue.
- Branch Colors:
  Ultramarine blue piped with Golden Orange.
  *Ultramarine Blue – 65010 cloth; 67118 yarn; Reflex blue PMS.
  *Golden Orange – 65003 cloth; 67109 yarn; PMS 1375.
- Birthday:
  12 April 1983.

== Aircraft ==
The U.S. Army operates some fixed-wing aircraft and many helicopters.

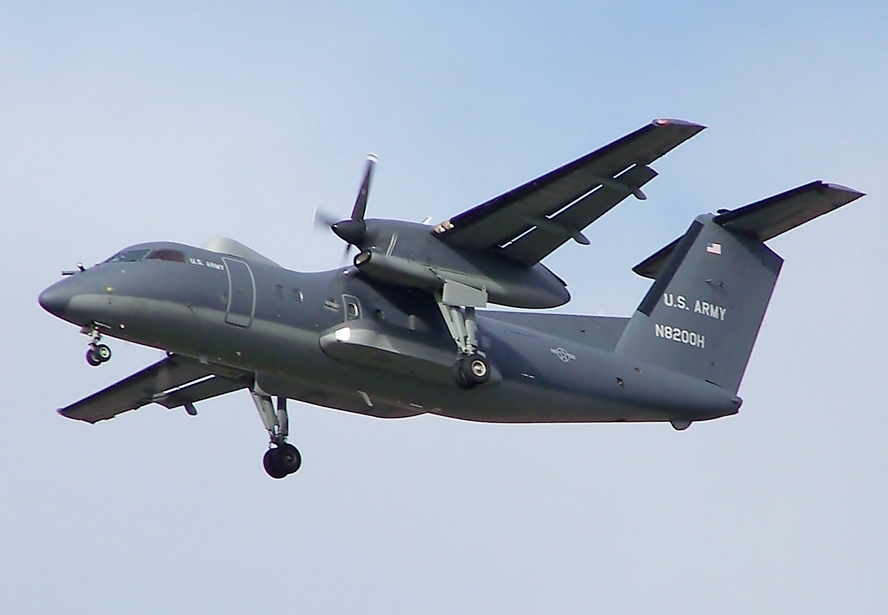
A signals intelligence DHC Dash 8 aircraft

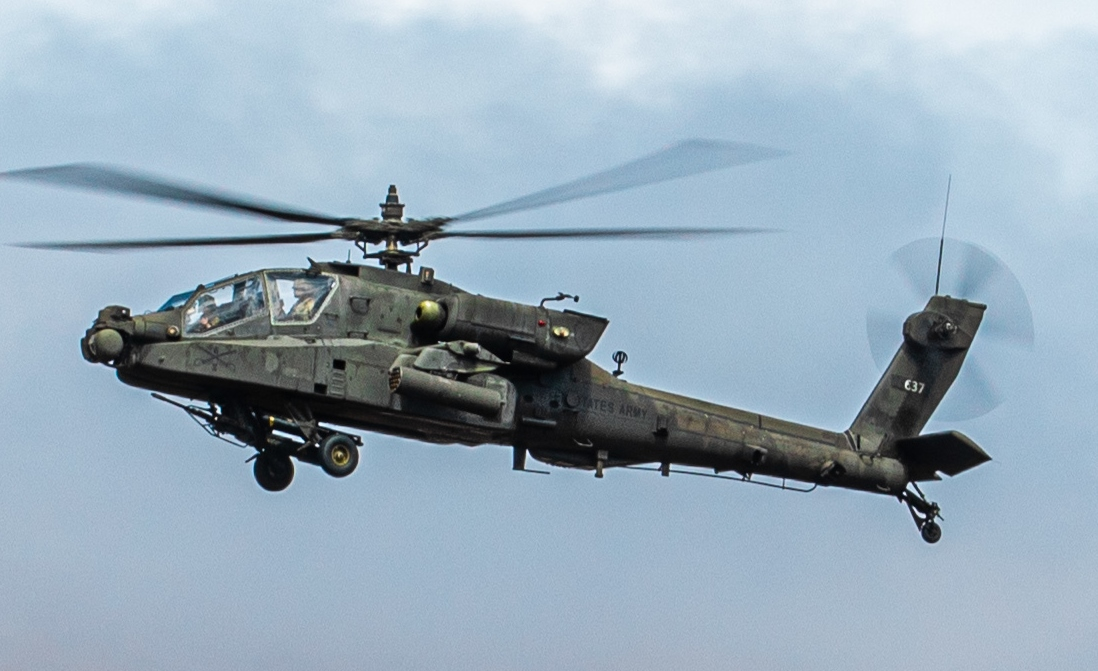
An AH-64 Apache

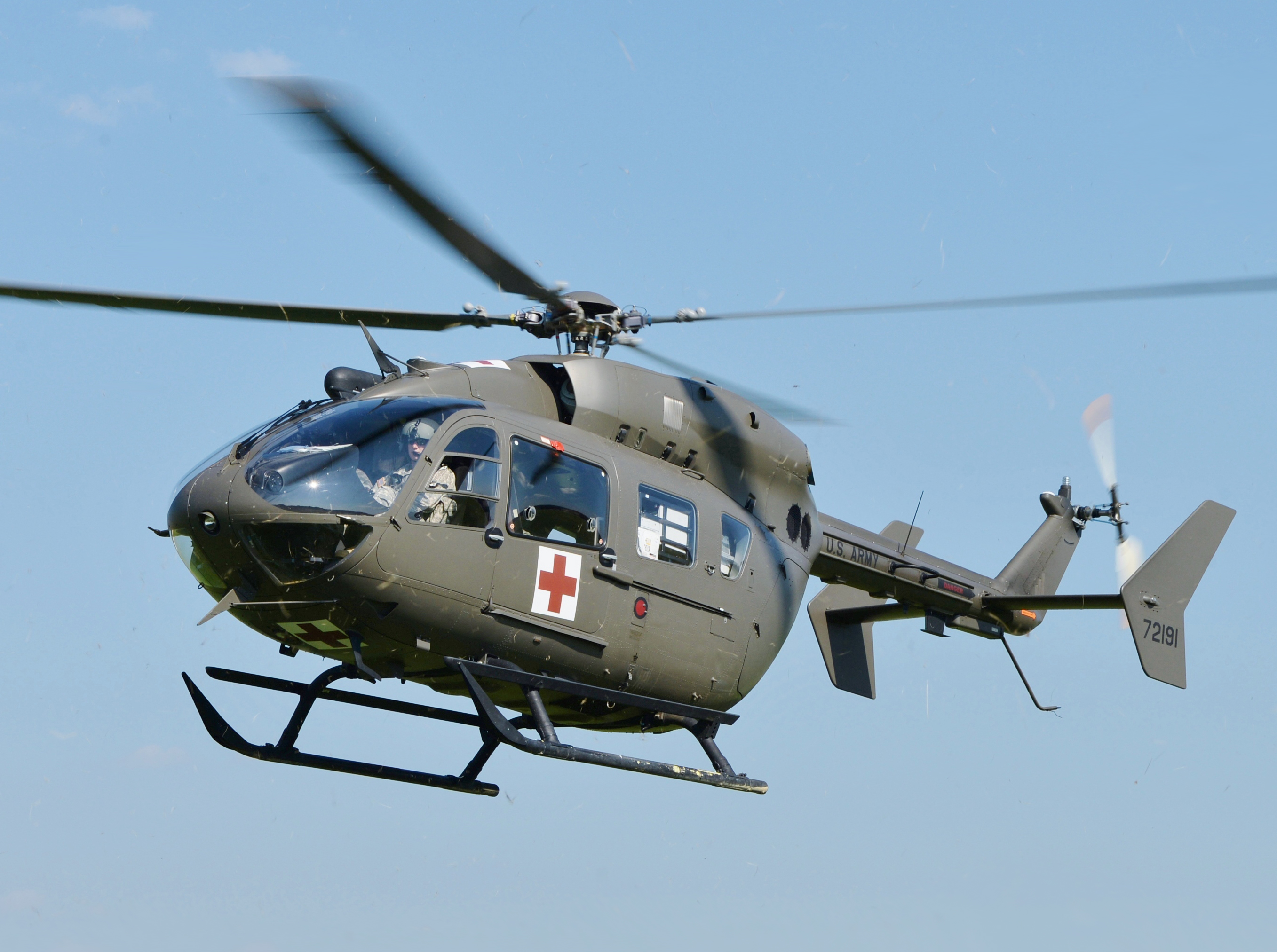
A UH-72 Lakota of the Army National Guard

Aircraft	Origin	Type	Variant	In service	Notes
Reconnaissance
DHC Dash 8	Canada	SIGINT / ELINT		9	
DHC Dash 7	Canada	SIGINT / ELINT	EO-5C	3	
RC-12 Guardrail	United States	SIGINT / surveillance		73	
Challenger CL-650	Canada	ISTAR		3	
Transport
Beechcraft C-12	United States	transport / utility		95	
Beechcraft 1900	United States	transport	C-12J	3	
Gulfstream IV	United States	VIP transport		1	
RC-26 Metro	United States	transport / utility		13	
Cessna Citation V	United States	VIP transport	UC-35B	28	
Alenia C-27J Spartan	Italy	transport / utility		7	
CASA C-212 Aviocar	Spain	transport / utility		5	
Helicopter
UH-72 Lakota	Germany	utility / SAR		391	30 on order - locally produced
MH-6 Little Bird	United States	multi-mission / attack		47	
AH-64 Apache	United States	attack	AH-64D/E	824	15 on order
UH-60 Black Hawk	United States	transport / utility	UH-60L/M	2,298	181 on order. 1 lost in 2025
CH-47 Chinook	United States	transport / heavy lift	CH-47D/F	510	61 MH-47G’s are used for Special Operations
Trainer Aircraft
Mil Mi-24	Russia	attack		1	used for OPFOR training
Mil Mi-17	Russia	utility		10	used for OPFOR training
T-6 Texan II	United States	advanced trainer	T-6D	4	
Grob G 120TP	Germany	basic trainer		6	contracted by CAE USA
Eurocopter AS350	France	light trainer		1	
Robinson R66	United States	light trainer	TH-66A Sage		

== See also ==
- List of active United States military aircraft (Army)
- Coats of arms of U.S. Army Aviation Regiments
- List of aviation companies of the United States Army
- List of United States Army aircraft battalions
- Fort Novosel
- United States Army Aviation School
- United States Army Aviation and Missile Command
- United States Army Aviation Museum
- Army aviation
- Pace-Finletter MOU 1952
