= Armed helicopter =

Military aircraft

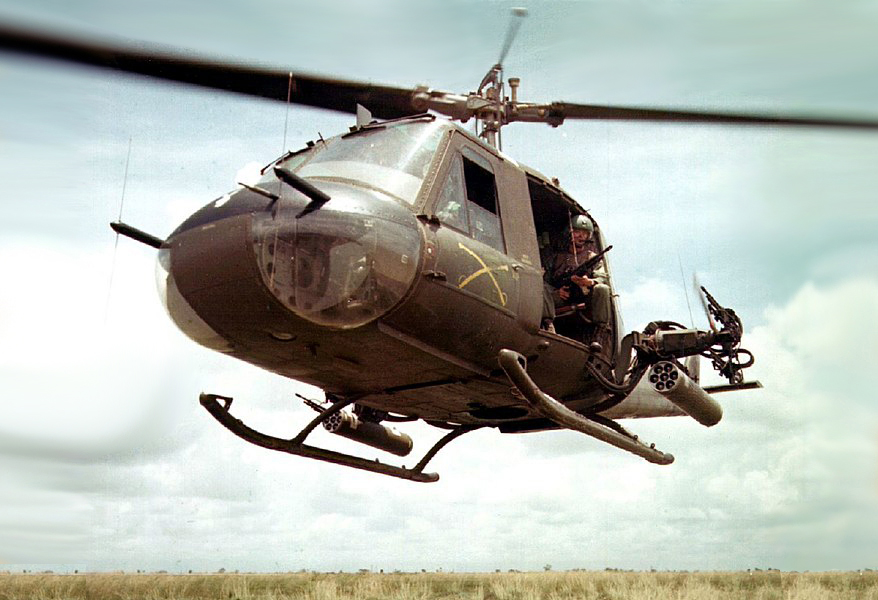
UH-1B in Vietnam, 1965

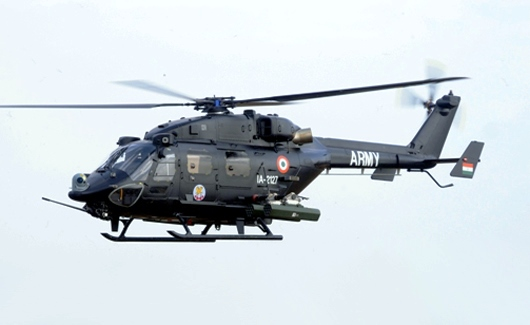
HAL Rudra, an armed variant of the unarmed HAL Dhruv transport helicopter

An armed helicopter is a military helicopter equipped with aircraft ordnance. Most commonly, it is used for attacking targets on the ground. Such a helicopter could be either purposely designed for a ground-attack mission—in which case it would be more specifically categorized as an attack helicopter—or may have been previously designed for other uses, such as utility, air cargo, aerial reconnaissance, etc., with the weapons mounts being modifications, rather than part of the design of the helicopter. The purpose of the modification to an armed helicopter configuration can be field expediency during combat, the lack of military funding to develop or purchase attack helicopters, or the need to maintain the helicopter for missions that do not require the weapons.

Specialized armed helicopters fly from ships at sea, and are equipped for anti-submarine warfare or strikes with anti-ship missiles.

== History ==
Direct fire support delivered by weapons mounted on helicopters began informally in the Korean War, with United States Marines firing their weapons from the open doors of the aircraft, into the treeline of the landing area below. The concept evolved with the French during the Algerian and the First Indochina wars, in the form of armed helicopters; where utility, cargo, and observation military helicopters were modified to carry various weapons.

=== Algerian War ===
The French Army was one of the first military forces to modify and use helicopters in combat in a ground attack role during the Algerian War of 1954–62. In 1955, French field commanders placed infantry machine gunners in the stretcher panniers of their Bell 47 (Sioux H-13) casualty evacuation helicopters. The ad hoc gunships were used to reach FLN guerrilla positions on otherwise inaccessible mountain ridges and peaks, but were far too underpowered.

In 1956, the French Air Force experimented with arming the Sikorsky S-55, then being superseded in service by the more capable Piasecki H-21 and Sikorsky CH-34 helicopters. The H-19 was originally fitted with two rocket launchers and an ex-Luftwaffe MG 151/20 20-mm cannon, both mounted axially on the outside of the aircraft. Later, an MG151/20 cannon, two .50 cal. (12.7-mm) Browning machine guns, and an FN Browning 7.5-mm light machine gun were mounted inside the fuselage at the cabin windows, but this load proved far too heavy, and even more lightly armed H-19 gunships proved underpowered. Some Piasecki H-21 helicopters were armed with fixed, forward-firing rockets and machine guns and a few even had racks for bombs, but the H-21 lacked the maneuverability and performance needed for offensive action. Most H-21s in service were eventually fitted with a single door-mounted 12.7 mm machine gun or an MG151/20 20-mm cannon as defensive armament.

The Sikorsky H-34 was also modified into a gunship by the French Navy: standard armament comprised an MG 151 20-mm cannon firing from the cabin door, two 12.7-mm machine guns firing from the cabin windows to port, plus racks for 37 mm or 68 mm rockets. While the CH-34 was effective in the ground attack role, official evaluations at the time indicated that the CH-21 was more likely to survive multiple hits by ground fire than was the CH-34; this was assumed to be a consequence of the location and construction of the CH-34's fuel tanks. Nevertheless, by the close of the Algerian War, attack helicopters such as the CH-34 were being used in synchronized operations with troop-carrying CH-21 helicopters in large-scale counterinsurgency operations.

=== Vietnam War ===
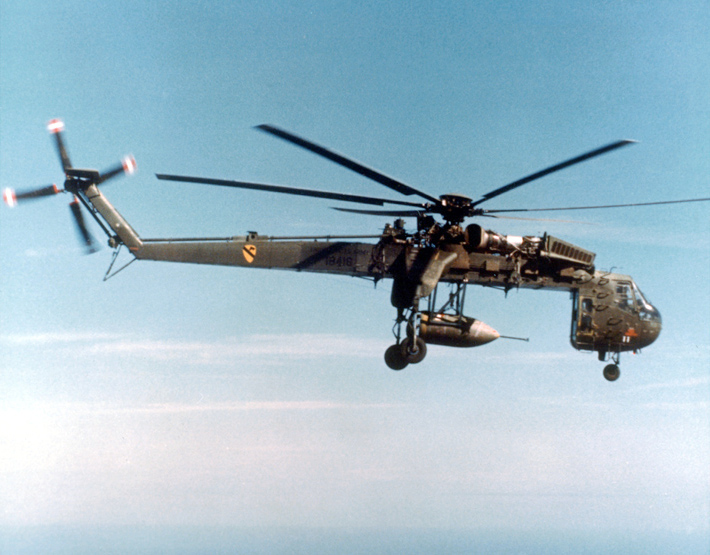
A Sikorsky CH-54 Tarhe of the U.S. Army 1st Cavalry Division carrying a BLU-82/B bomb

The United States Navy and the United Kingdom began modifying existing helicopters as anti-submarine weapons (ASW) platforms, carrying depth bombs and Magnetic Anomaly Detector gear. After learning of French Army experiments, there was a movement within the U.S. Army to arm helicopters. Under the leadership of Colonel Jay Vanderpool, the U.S. Army modified Sikorsky and other larger helicopters with fixed and flexible-mount machine guns, rockets, and cannon. While Col. Vanderpool was ridiculed by some in the Army, others saw his efforts as a great aid to ground troops. At the time, the Army leadership felt that the U.S. Air Force was not doing enough to support ground forces, and due to the Key West Agreement, the Army could not field its own ground attack fixed-wing aircraft.

With the increasing use of the helicopter for infantry transport, the U.S. Army saw a need for specialized helicopters to be used as aerial artillery to provide fire suppression and ground support close to the battle. The first United States use of the armed helicopter in large-scale combat operations was during the Vietnam War. First the U.S. Army modified UH-1B 'Huey' helicopters, mounting machine guns and Folding Fin Aerial Rockets (FFAR) on struts parallel with the fuselage. Eventually, the U.S. Army would upgrade the engine and rotor to the UH-1C model, and again to the UH-1M model, to overcome power issues as more and more armament was added to the helicopters. But this was not fully satisfactory, so the AH-1 helicopter was developed.

=== Warsaw Pact ===
During the 1960s, the Soviet Union saw the need for an armed helicopter and equipped Mil Mi-8 helicopters with rocket pods. This armed helicopter eventually developed into the Mil Mi-24, which saw extensive action in Afghanistan during the 80s. Mi-24s were also exported in large numbers to many Asian and African countries.

=== Special operations variants ===
In the last 20 years US Special Operations Command has been developing the special forces gunship, using the MH-60. These helicopters are to be used as an attack element with special operators to do the cleanup, or to deliver the operators and support them on the ground. They were used successfully during the Scud hunt.

Other Army Special Operations include the MH-6 and AH-6 "Little Birds". The MH-6 carries special operators on benches outside the helicopters, from which they can move quickly. The AH-6 is for close air support. The MH-47 Chinook helicopter has been used to carry special operators using long-wheelbase Land Rovers and other vehicles in and out of an area of operations.

For longer-range special operations, the Air Force had operated the MH-53 Pave Low helicopter with extensive avionics for navigation, flying at very low altitude, and electronic warfare. However the Pave Lows were retired at the end of September 2008, and the role is now being performed by Air Force CV-22 Ospreys.

== Helicopter bombing uses ==
The idea of the helicopter as a bomber has likely been around since helicopters first came into military service. The helicopter offers what might appear to be a highly stable bombing platform, making the idea all the more attractive. The idea is generally used by air forces conducting counterinsurgencies, and often by those lacking traditional fixed wing options.

=== Vietnam ===
Likely the first organized usage of a helicopter as a tactical bomber, the United States Army employed the UH-1 Iroquois, CH-47 Chinook, and CH-54 Tarhe helicopters. The US Army had already conducted tests using the OH-13 Sioux fitted with small napalm tanks.

The CH-47 was used most often to assist in the clearing of bunkers, using an improvised bomb made from 55-gallon drums of bulk CS powder, designated Bomb, Fuze, and Burster, CS in 55-gallon Drum, XM920. Thirty of these bombs, containing eighty pounds of CS powder, could be carried by a CH-47, and were used to "saturate base camps, way stations, or infiltration routes to deny their use."

The US Army used the UH-1 with a far wider array of systems. Using the M156 Universal Mount, conventional aircraft dispensers for cluster munitions and mines were fitted. Another system developed was the Mortar Aerial Delivery System or MADS. This system used standard 60mm or 81mm mortar rounds in dispensers mounted on the side of the aircraft, and was to be used against both preplanned targets and targets of opportunity. Pictures show this system in use as late as 1969. Even improvised bombs, made from things such as a "can of engine oil...[and] a thermite grenade" or "four or five concussion grenades...[with] belted M-60 ammunition around the grenades" were used.

The US Army also conducted a number of drops of large bombs using the CH-54 helicopter for the purposes of clearing landing zones. Operational drops were conducted using both modified M121 10,000 lb bombs and the BLU-82/B 15,000 lb bomb. Tests conducted prior to the deployment of weapons and equipment for Operation Combat Trap led to discontinued use of the CH-54 and a switch to the C-130E(I) aircraft (later MC-130E).

Both the US Army and US Marine Corps also investigated using the AH-1 Cobra attack helicopter as a bomber. The Army tested a dispenser system that could be used to drop smoke grenades, while the USMC went further and qualified the aircraft to carry the CBU-55/B Fuel Air Explosive. While the USMC continued to qualify their subsequent AH-1 variants for the CBU-55/B weapon, there are no reports of it actually being used in combat.

=== El Salvador ===
During their conflict with FMLN and other guerrillas between 1980 and 1992, the Salvadoran Army made use of the UH-1 Iroquois in the bombing role. UH-1Hs and UH-1Ms flew punitive strikes against villages linked to the FMLN dropping 250 and 500 pound bombs. The need for this greater flexibility was required by the nature of the conflict and the lack of resources available to the Salvadoran Air Force. Since the bombs utilized used the same type of mounting hardware as the standard rocket launchers, the FAS used M156 universal mounts and essentially unmodified aircraft.

=== Lebanon ===
Helicopter bombing was used by the Lebanese Army during the 2007 Siege of Nahr al-Bared when it converted UH-1H utility helicopters into bombers due to the urgent need to fight the Fatah al-Islam terrorist group. They mounted 30-year-old 500 lb (250 kg) Mark 82 bombs, originally carried by Hawker Hunter attack aircraft.

=== Syria ===
Helicopters have been used to drop both conventional bombs and improvised "Barrel Bombs" by the Syrian Air Force during the Syrian Civil War since at least August 2012. Mi-8s, Mi-17s, Mi-14s and Mi-24s have all been used to bomb rebel-held cities and military positions. Their seemingly indiscriminate use against civilian population centers has drawn international scorn. The United Nations Security Council adopted a resolution in February 2014 demanding an end to indiscriminate aerial bombing, to include the use of barrel bombs dropped by helicopters.

=== Iraq ===
Helicopters have been used by the Iraqi Air Force during the Anbar campaign (2013–14) and the subsequent Northern Iraq offensive (June 2014). According to Erin Evers of Human Rights Watch, "What's happening now in Iraq definitely started in Syria. If I were al-Maliki, and seeing Assad next door using the same tactics without a slap on the wrist and gaining ground as a result, it stands to reason he would say, 'Why the hell not?'".

=== Tests and evaluations ===
Other nations have also made moves toward helicopter bombing, but have not put it into practice. The Soviet Union qualified both the Mil Mi-8 and Mil Mi-24 to use members of the FAB general-purpose bomb family. It is possible these aircraft may have been put into service in this role by the armed forces of Sudan and Sri Lanka.

The Philippines also tested a single Sikorsky H-34 as an attack helicopter, armed with both rockets and bombs on locally fabricated racks. This aircraft appears to have been the extent of the testing, and the Philippines did not introduce any H-34s in this capacity.

== See also ==
- Air interdiction
- Army aviation
- Tactical bombing
- U.S. helicopter armament subsystems
