= Attack aircraft =

Tactical military aircraft

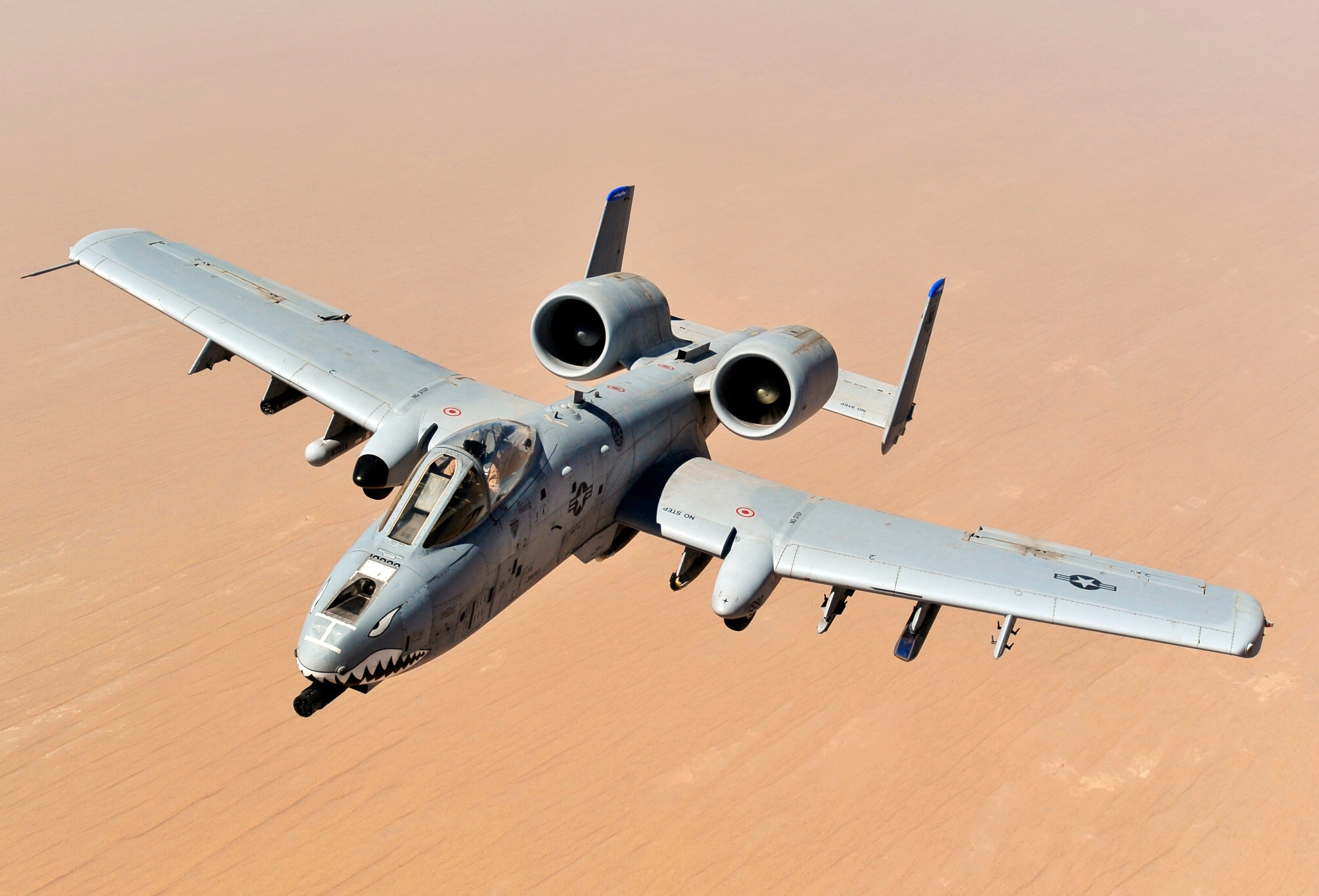
A USAF A-10 Thunderbolt II attack aircraft in flight

An attack aircraft, strike aircraft, or attack bomber is a tactical military aircraft that has a primary role of carrying out airstrikes with greater precision than bombers, and is prepared to encounter strong low-level air defenses while pressing the attack. This class of aircraft is designed mostly for close air support and naval air-to-surface missions, overlapping the tactical bomber mission. Designs dedicated to non-naval roles are often known as ground-attack aircraft.

Fighter aircraft often carry out the attack role, although they would not be considered attack aircraft per se; fighter-bomber conversions of those same aircraft would be considered part of the class. Strike fighters, which have effectively replaced the fighter-bomber and light bomber concepts, also differ little from the broad concept of an attack aircraft.

The dedicated attack aircraft as a separate class existed primarily during and after World War II. The precise implementation varied from country to country, and was handled by a wide variety of designs. In the United States and Britain, attack aircraft were generally light bombers or medium bombers, sometimes carrying heavier forward-firing weapons like the North American B-25G Mitchell and de Havilland Mosquito Tsetse. In Germany and the USSR, where they were known as Schlachtflugzeug ("battle aircraft") or sturmovik ("storm trooper") respectively, this role was carried out by purpose-designed and heavily armored aircraft such as the Henschel Hs 129 and Ilyushin Il-2. The Germans and Soviets also used light bombers in this role: cannon-armed versions of the Junkers Ju 87 Stuka greatly outnumbered the Hs 129, while the Petlyakov Pe-2 was used for this role in spite of not being specifically designed for it.

In the latter part of World War II, the fighter-bomber began to take over many attack roles, a transition that continued in the post-war era. Jet-powered examples existed, albeit rarely, such as the Blackburn Buccaneer. The U.S. Navy continued to introduce new aircraft in their A-series, but these were mostly similar to light and medium bombers. The need for a separate attack aircraft category was greatly diminished by the introduction of precision-guided munitions which allowed almost any aircraft to carry out this role while remaining safe at high altitude. Attack helicopters also have overtaken many remaining roles that could only be carried out at lower altitudes.

Since the 1960s, only two dedicated attack aircraft designs have been widely introduced, the American Fairchild Republic A-10 Thunderbolt II and the Soviet/Russian Sukhoi Su-25 Grach (rook) (NATO reporting name Frogfoot).

A variety of light attack aircraft has also been introduced in the post–World War II era, usually based on adapted trainers or other light fixed-wing aircraft. These have been used in counter-insurgency operations.

== Definition and designations ==
=== United States definition and designations ===
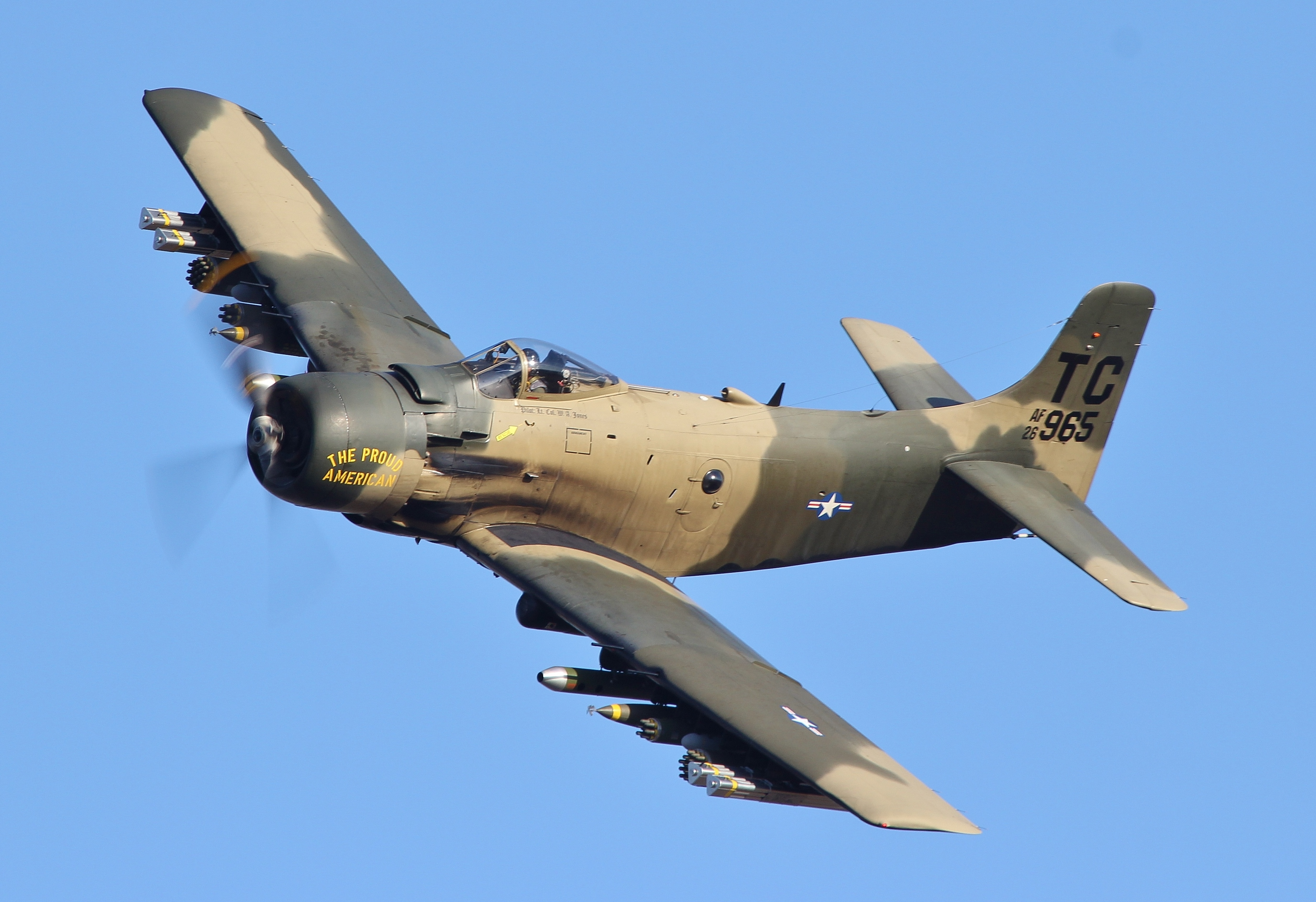
An A-1 Skyraider of the USAF

U.S. attack aircraft are currently identified by the prefix A-, as in "A-6 Intruder" and "A-10 Thunderbolt II". However, until the end of World War II the A- designation was shared between attack planes and light bombers for USAAF aircraft (as opposed to B- prefix for medium or heavy bombers). The US Navy used a separate designation system and at the time preferred to call similar aircraft scout bombers (SB) or torpedo bombers (TB or BT). For example, Douglas SBD Dauntless scout bomber was designated A-24 when used by the USAAF. It was not until 1946, when the US Navy and US Marine Corps started using the "attack" (A) designation, when it renamed BT2D Skyraider and BTM Mauler to, respectively, AD Skyraider and AM Mauler.

As with many aircraft classifications, the definition of attack aircraft is somewhat vague and has tended to change over time. Current U.S. military doctrine defines it as an aircraft which most likely performs an attack mission, more than any other kind of mission. Attack mission means, in turn, specifically tactical air-to-ground action—in other words, neither air-to-air action nor strategic bombing is considered an attack mission. In United States Navy vocabulary, the alternative designation for the same activity is a strike mission. Attack missions are principally divided into two categories: air interdiction and close air support. In the last several decades, the rise of the ubiquitous multi-role fighter has created some confusion about the difference between attack and fighter aircraft. According to the current U.S. designation system, an attack aircraft (A) is designed primarily for air-to-surface (Attack: Aircraft designed to find, attack, and destroy land or sea targets) missions (also known as "attack missions"), while a fighter category F incorporates not only aircraft designed primarily for air-to-air combat, but additionally multipurpose aircraft designed also for ground-attack missions.

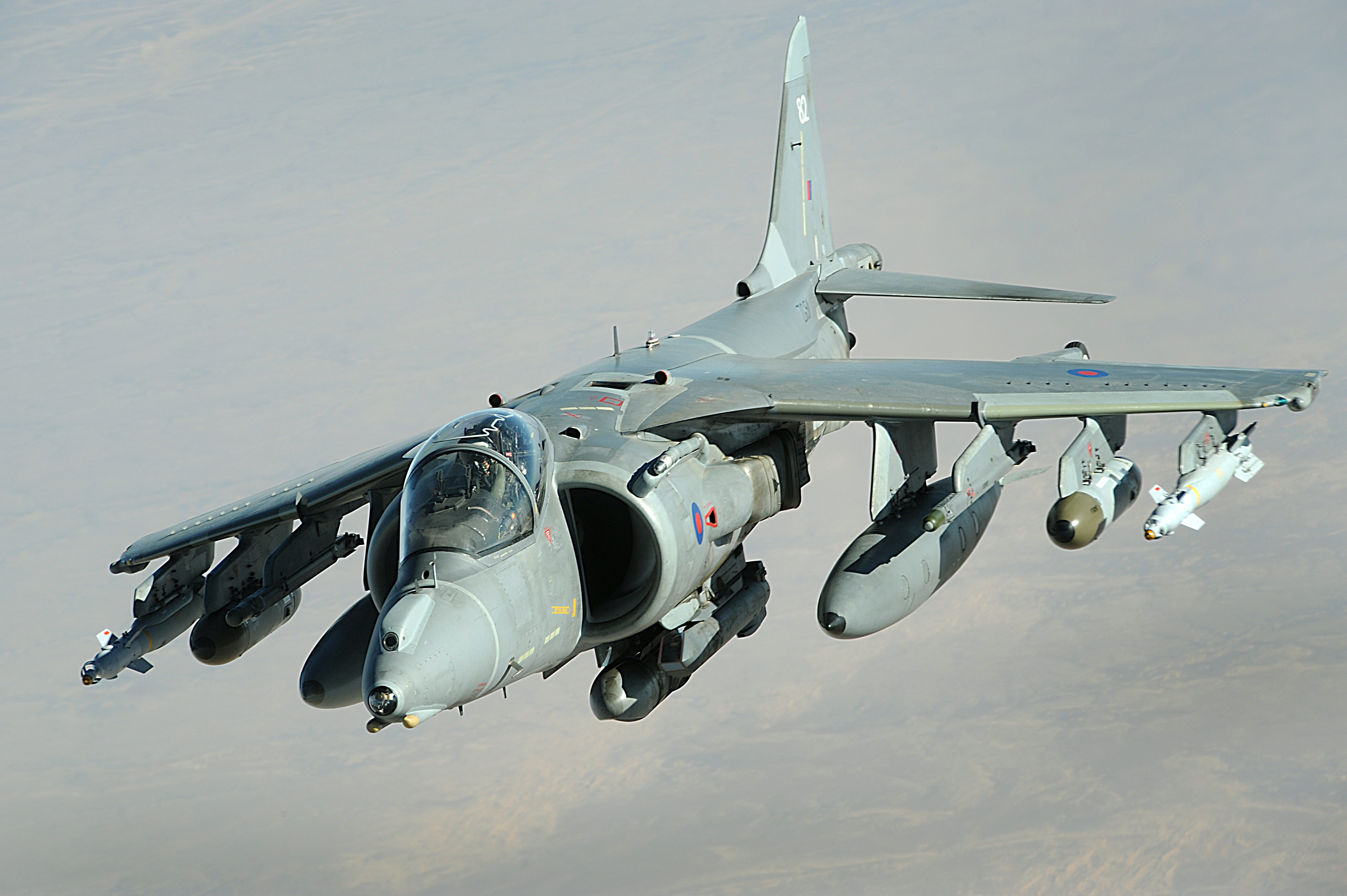
RAF Harrier GR9 in flight, 2008

"F" – Fighter Aircraft were designed to intercept and destroy other aircraft or missiles. This includes multipurpose aircraft also designed for ground support missions such as interdiction and close air support. Just to mention one example amongst many, the F-111 "Aardvark" was designated F despite having only minimal air-to-air capabilities. Only a single aircraft in the USAF's current inventory bears a simple, unmixed "A" designation: the A-10 Thunderbolt II.

=== Other designations ===
British designations have included FB for fighter-bomber and more recently "G" for "Ground-attack" as in Harrier GR1 (meaning "Ground-attack/Reconnaissance, Mark 1").

Imperial Japanese Navy designation use "B" to designate carrier attack bomber such as the Nakajima B5N Type-97 bomber although these aircraft are mostly used for torpedo attack and level bombing. They also use "D" to specifically designate carrier dive bomber like the Yokosuka D4Y Suisei. However by the end of the World War II, the IJN introduced the Aichi B7A Ryusei which could performed both torpedo bombing and dive bombing rendering the "D" designation redundant.

The NATO reporting names for Soviet/Russian ground-attack aircraft at first started with "B" categorizing them as bombers, as in case of Il-10 'Beast'. But later they were usually classified as fighters ("F")—possibly because (since Sukhoi Su-7) they were similar in size and visual appearance to Soviet fighters, or were simply derivatives of such.

In the PLAAF, ground-attack aircraft are given the designation "Q". So far this has only been given to the Nanchang Q-5.

== History ==
=== World War I ===
The attack aircraft as a role was defined by its use during World War I, in support of ground forces on battlefields. Battlefield support is generally divided into close air support and battlefield air interdiction, the first requiring strict and the latter only general cooperation with friendly surface forces. Such aircraft also attacked targets in rear areas. Such missions required flying where light anti-aircraft fire was expected and operating at low altitudes to precisely identify targets. Other roles, including those of light bombers, medium bombers, dive bombers, reconnaissance, fighters, fighter-bombers, could and did perform air strikes on battlefields. All these types could significantly damage ground targets from a low level flight, either by bombing, machine guns, or both.

Attack aircraft came to diverge from bombers and fighters. While bombers could be used on a battlefield, their slower speeds made them extremely vulnerable to ground fire, as did the lighter construction of fighters. The survivability of attack aircraft was improved by their speed/power, protection (i.e. armor panels) and strength of construction;

Germany was the first country to produce dedicated ground-attack aircraft (designated CL-class and J-class). They were put into use in autumn 1917, during World War I. Most notable was the Junkers J.I, which pioneered the idea of an armored "bathtub", that was both fuselage structure and protection for engine and crew. The British experimented with the Sopwith TF series (termed "trench fighters"), although these did not see combat.

The last battles of 1918 on the Western Front demonstrated that ground-attacking aircraft were a valuable component of all-arms tactics. Close support ground strafing (machine-gunning) and tactical bombing of infantry (especially when moving between trenches and along roads), machine gun posts, artillery, and supply formations was a part of the Allied armies' strength in holding German attacks and supporting Allied counter-attacks and offensives. Admittedly, the cost to the Allies was high, with the Royal Flying Corps sustaining a loss rate approaching 30% among ground-attack aircraft.

=== 1919–1939 ===
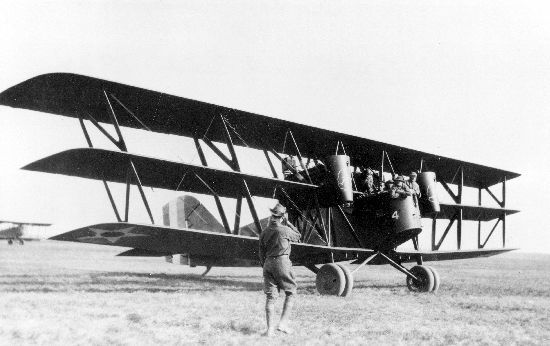
Boeing GA-1, ~1920

After World War I, it was widely believed that using aircraft against tactical targets was of little use other than in harassing and undermining enemy morale; attacking combatants was generally much more dangerous to aircrews than their targets, a problem that was continually becoming more acute with the ongoing refinement of anti-aircraft weapons. Within the range of types serving attack roles, dive bombers were increasingly being seen as more effective than aircraft designed for strafing with machine guns or cannons.

Nevertheless, during the 1920s, the US military, in particular, procured specialized "Attack" aircraft and formed dedicated units, that were trained primarily for that role. The US Army Engineering Division became involved in designing ground attack aircraft. The 1920 Boeing GA-1 was an armored twin-engine triplane for ground strafing with eight machine guns and about a ton of armor plate, and the 1922 Aeromarine PG-1 was a combined pursuit (fighter) and ground attack design with a 37mm gun. The United States Marine Corps Aviation applied close air support tactics in the Banana Wars. While they did not pioneer dive bombing tactics, Marine aviators were the first to include it in their doctrine during the United States occupation of Haiti and Nicaragua. The United States Army Air Corps was notable for its creation of a separate "A-" designation for attack types, distinct from and alongside "B-" for bomber types and "P-" for pursuit (later replaced by "F-" for fighter) aircraft. The first designated attack type to be operational with the USAAC was the Curtiss A-2 Falcon. Nevertheless, such aircraft, including the A-2's replacement, the Curtiss A-12 Shrike, were unarmored and highly vulnerable to AA fire.

The British Royal Air Force focused primarily on strategic bombing, rather than ground attack. However, like most air arms of the period it did operate attack aircraft, named Army Cooperation in RAF parlance, which included the Hawker Hector, Westland Lysander and others.

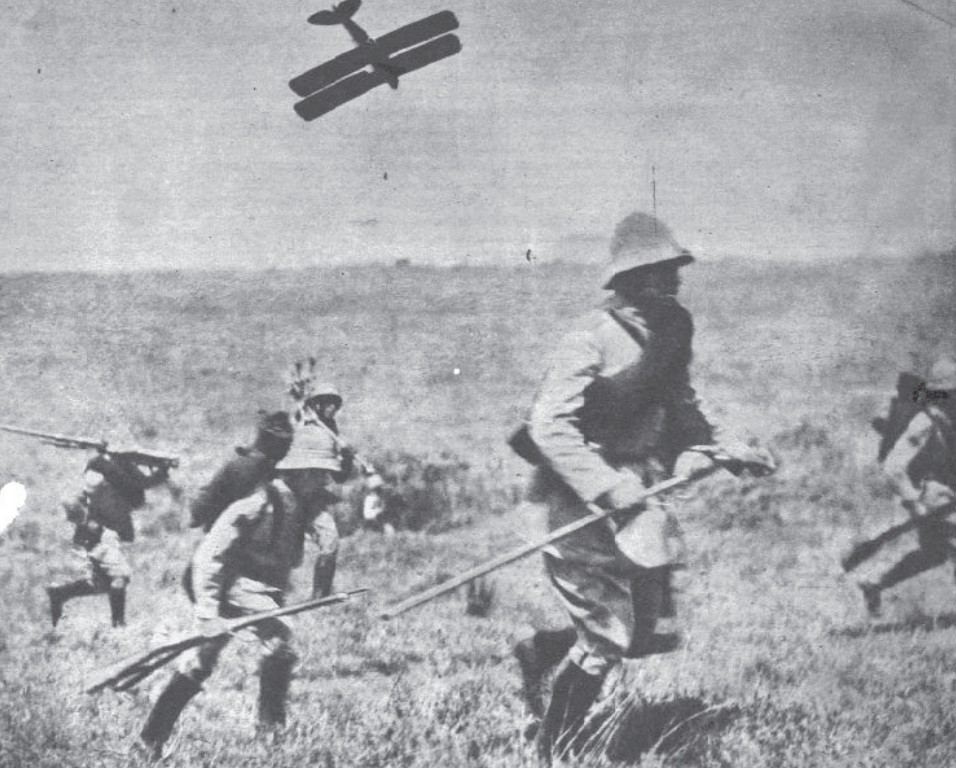
Rebel infantry advancing under air attack by a Waco CSO (or Potez 25) airplane of the Brazilian government during the Constitutionalist Revolution of 1932

Aviation played a role in the Brazilian Constitutionalist Revolution of 1932, although both sides had few aircraft. The federal government had approximately 58 aircraft divided between the Navy and the Army, as the Air Force at this time did not constitute an independent branch. In contrast, the rebels had only two Potez 25 planes and two Waco CSO, plus a small number of private aircraft.

During the 1930s, Nazi Germany had begun to field a class of Schlacht ("battle") aircraft, such as the Henschel Hs 123. Moreover, the experiences of German Condor Legion during the Spanish Civil War, against an enemy with few fighter aircraft, changed ideas about ground attack. Though equipped with generally unsuitable designs such as the Henschel Hs 123 and cannon-armed versions of the Heinkel He 112, their armament and pilots proved that aircraft were a very effective weapon, even without bombs. This led to some support within the Luftwaffe for the creation of an aircraft dedicated to this role, resulting in tenders for a new "attack aircraft". This led to the introduction (in 1942) of a unique single-seat, twin-engine attack aircraft, the slow-moving but heavily armored and formidably armed Henschel Hs 129 Panzerknacker ("Safecracker" /"Tank Cracker").

In Japan, the Imperial Japanese Navy had developed the Aichi D3A dive bomber (based on the Heinkel He 70) and the Mitsubishi B5M light attack bomber. Both, like their US counterparts, were lightly armored types, and were critically reliant on surprise attacks and the absence of significant fighter or AA opposition.

During the Winter War, the Soviet Air Forces used the Polikarpov R-5SSS, and Polikarpov R-ZSh, as attack aircraft.

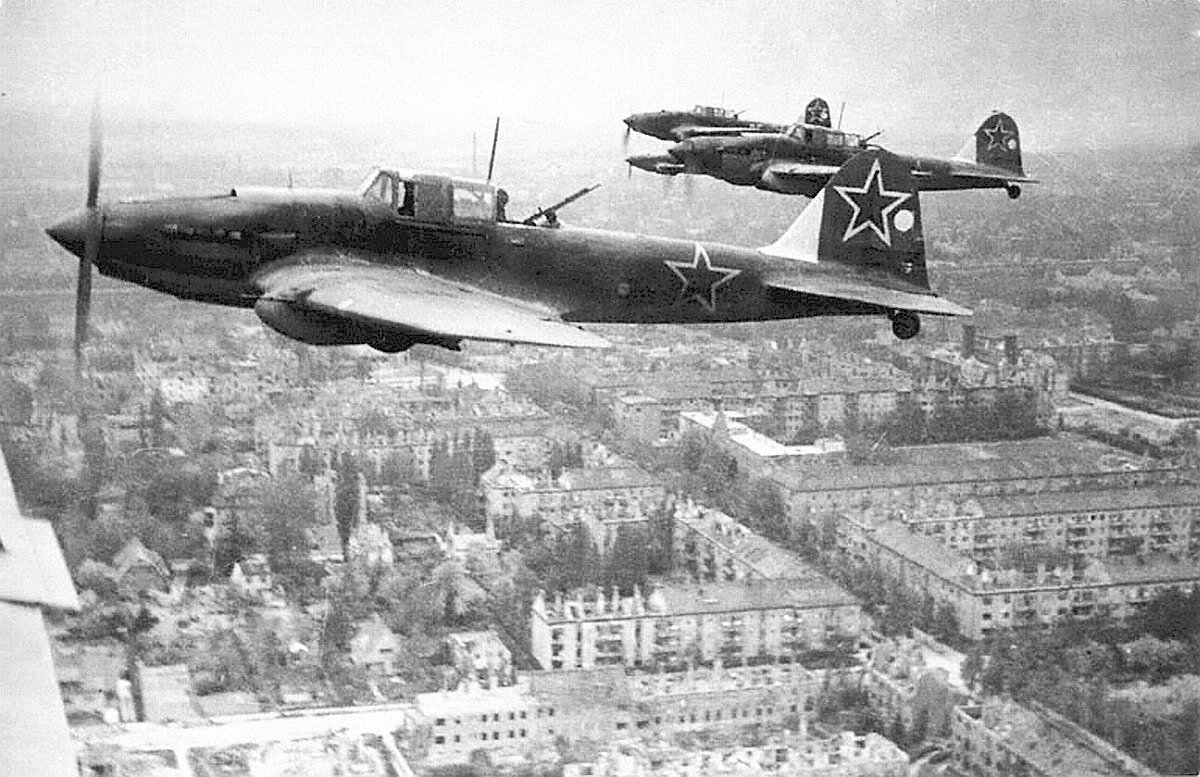
An Ilyushin Il-2 Sturmovik formation over Berlin, May 1945.

Perhaps the most notable attack type to emerge during the late 1930s was the Soviet Ilyushin Il-2 Sturmovik, which became the most-produced military aircraft type in history.

As World War II approached, the concept of an attack aircraft was not well defined, and various air services used many different names for widely differing types, all performing similar roles (sometimes in tandem with non-attack roles of bombers, fighters, reconnaissance and other roles.

Army co-operation

The British concept of a light aircraft mixing all the roles that required extensive communication with land forces: reconnaissance, liaison, artillery spotting, aerial supply, and, last but not least, occasional strikes on the battlefield. The concept was similar to front-line aircraft used in the World War I, which was called the CL class in the German Empire. Eventually the RAF's experience showed types such as Westland Lysander to be unacceptably vulnerable and it was replaced by faster fighter types for photo-reconnaissance, and light aircraft for artillery spotting.

Light bomber

During the inter-war period, the British flew the Fairey Battle, a light bomber which originated in a 1932 specification. Designs in 1938 for a replacement were adapted as a target tug. The last British specification issued for a light bomber was B.20/40 described as a "Close Army Support Bomber" capable of dive bombing and photo-reconnaissance. However, the specification was dropped before an aircraft went into production.

Dive bomber

In some air services, dive bombers did not equip ground-attack units, but were treated as a separate class. In Nazi Germany, the Luftwaffe distinguished between the Stuka (Sturzkampf-, "dive bombing") units, equipped with Junkers Ju 87 from Schlacht ("battle") units, using strafing/low-level bombing types such as the Henschel Hs 123).

Fighter-bomber

Although not a synonymous class with ground-attack aircraft, fighter-bombers were usually used for the role, and proved to excel at it, even when they were only lightly armored. The Royal Air Force and United States Army Air Forces relegated obsolescent fighters to this role, while cutting-edge fighters would serve as interceptors and establish air superiority.

The United States Navy, in distinction to the USAAF, preferred the older term "Scout-Bomber", under a "SB-" designation, such as the Curtiss SB2C Helldiver.

=== World War II ===
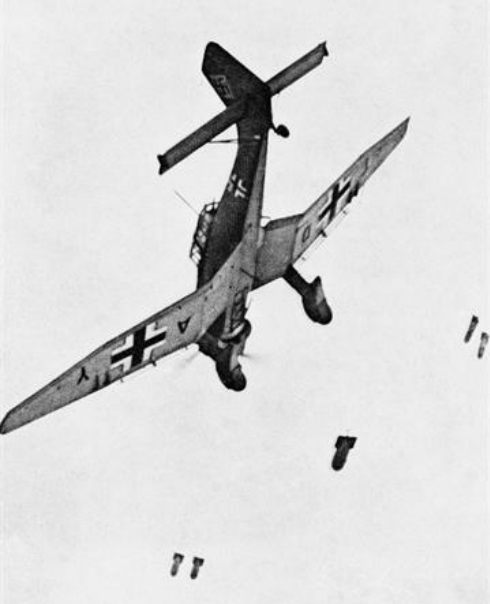
Junkers Ju 87B Stuka dropping bombs

The Junkers Ju 87s of the German Luftwaffe became virtually synonymous with close air support during the early months of World War II. The British Commonwealth's Desert Air Force, led by Arthur Tedder, became the first Allied tactical formation to emphasize the attack role, usually in the form of single-engine Hawker Hurricane and Curtiss P-40 fighter-bombers or specialized "tank-busters", such as the Hurricane Mk IID, armed with two 40 mm Vickers S guns (notably No. 6 Squadron RAF). At around the same time, a massive invasion by Axis forces had forced the Soviet air forces to quickly expand their army support capacity, such as the Ilyushin Il-2 Sturmovik. The women pilots known as the "Night Witches" utilised an obsolescent, wooden light trainer biplane type, the Polikarpov Po-2 and small anti-personnel bombs in "harassment bombing" attacks that proved difficult to counter.

Wartime experience showed that poorly armored and/or lightly built, pre-war types were unacceptably vulnerable, especially to fighters. Nevertheless, skilled crews could be highly successful in those types, such as the leading Stuka ace, Hans-Ulrich Rudel, who claimed 500 tanks, a battleship, a cruiser, and two destroyers in 2,300 combat missions.

The Bristol Beaufighter, based on an obsolescent RAF bomber, became a versatile twin-engine attack aircraft and served in almost every theatre of the war, in the maritime strike and ground attack roles as well as that of night fighter.

Conversely, some mid-war attack types emerged as adaptations of fighters, including several versions of the German Focke-Wulf Fw 190, the British Hawker Typhoon and the US Republic P-47 Thunderbolt. The Typhoon, which was disappointing as a fighter, due to poor high altitude performance, was very fast at low altitudes and thus became the RAF's premier ground attack fighter. It was armed with four 20mm cannon, augmented first with bombs, then rockets. Likewise the P-47 was designed and intended for use as a high altitude bomber escort, but gradually found that role filled by the North American P-51 Mustang (because of its much longer range and greater maneuverability). The P-47 was also heavier and more robust than the P-51 and regarded therefore, as an "energy fighter": ideal for high-speed dive-and-climb tactics, including strafing attacks. Its armament of eight 0.50 caliber machine guns was effective against Axis infantry and light vehicles in both Europe and the Pacific.

While machine guns and cannon were initially sufficient, the evolution of well-armored tanks required heavier weapons. To augment bombs, high explosive rockets were introduced, although these unguided projectiles were still "barely adequate" because of their inaccuracy. For the British RP3, one hit per sortie was considered acceptable. However, even a near miss with rockets could cause damage or injuries to "soft targets," and patrols by Allied rocket-armed aircraft over Normandy disrupted or even completely paralyzed German road traffic. They also affected morale, because even the prospect of a rocket attack was unnerving.

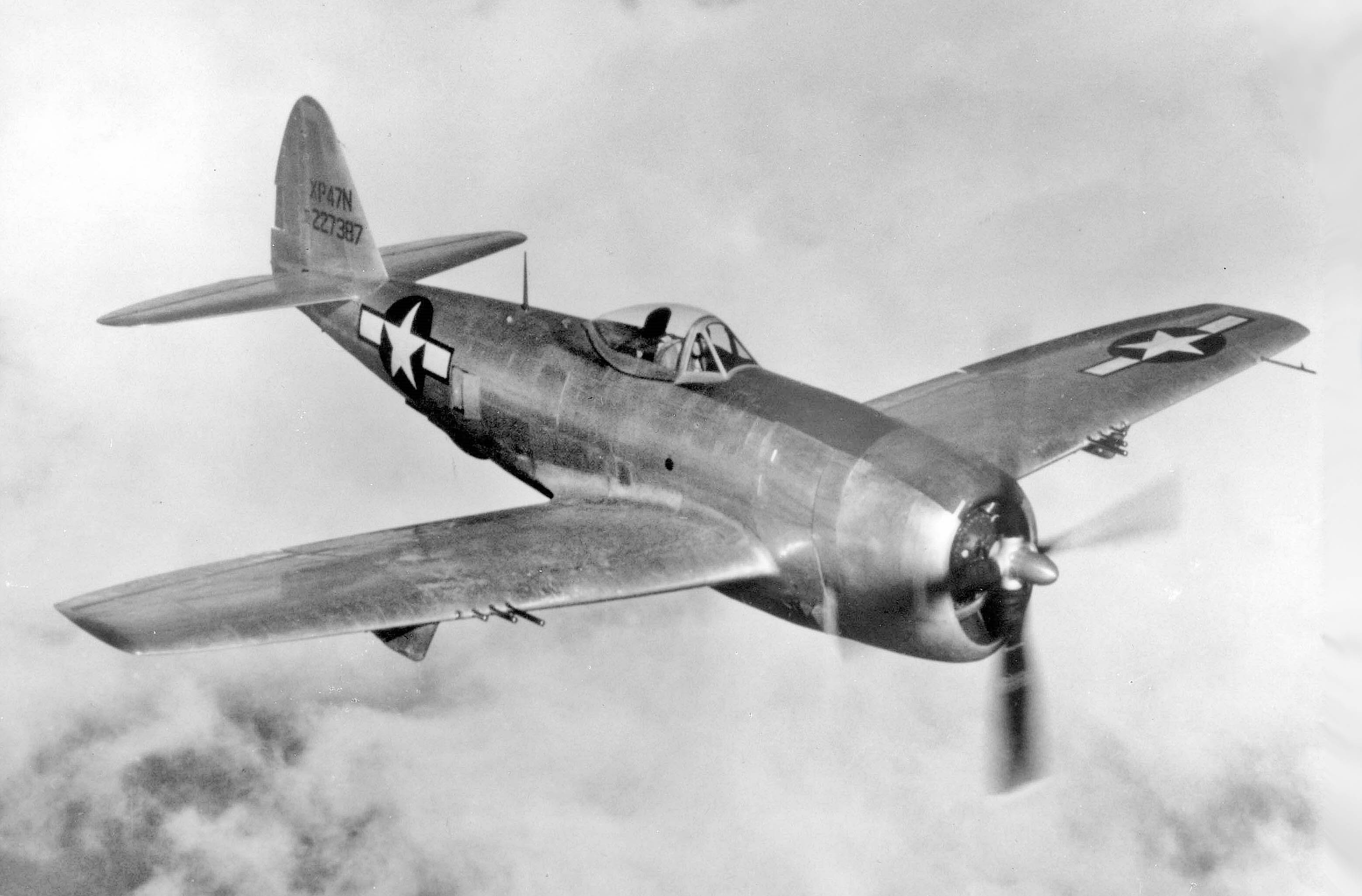
Republic P-47N Thunderbolt, flew combat missions during World War II

The ultimate development of the cannon-armed light attack aircraft was the small production run in 1944 of the Henschel Hs 129B-3, armed with a modified PAK 40 75 mm anti-tank gun. This weapon, the Bordkanone BK 7,5, was the most powerful forward-firing weapon fitted to a production military aircraft during World War II. The only other aircraft to be factory-equipped with similar guns were the 1,420 maritime strike variants of the North American B-25 MitchellG/H, which mounted either a M4 cannon, or light-weight T13E1 or M5 versions of the same gun. These weapons, however, were hand-loaded, had shorter barrels and/or a lower muzzle velocity than the BK 7,5 and, therefore, poorer armor penetration, accuracy and rate of fire. (Except for versions of the Piaggio P.108 armed with a 102mm anti-ship cannon, The BK 7,5 was unsurpassed as an aircraft-fitted gun until 1971, when the four-engine Lockheed AC-130E Spectre; equipped with a 105 mm M102 howitzer, entered service with the US Air Force.)

=== Post–World War II ===
In the immediate post war era the piston-engined ground-attack aircraft remained useful since all of the early jets lacked endurance due to the fuel consumption rates of the jet engines. The higher powered piston engine types that had been too late for World War II were still capable of holding their own against the jets as they were able to both out accelerate and out maneuver the jets. The Royal Navy Hawker Sea Fury fighters and the U.S. Vought F4U Corsair and Douglas A-1 Skyraider were operated during the Korean War while the latter continued to be used throughout the Vietnam War.

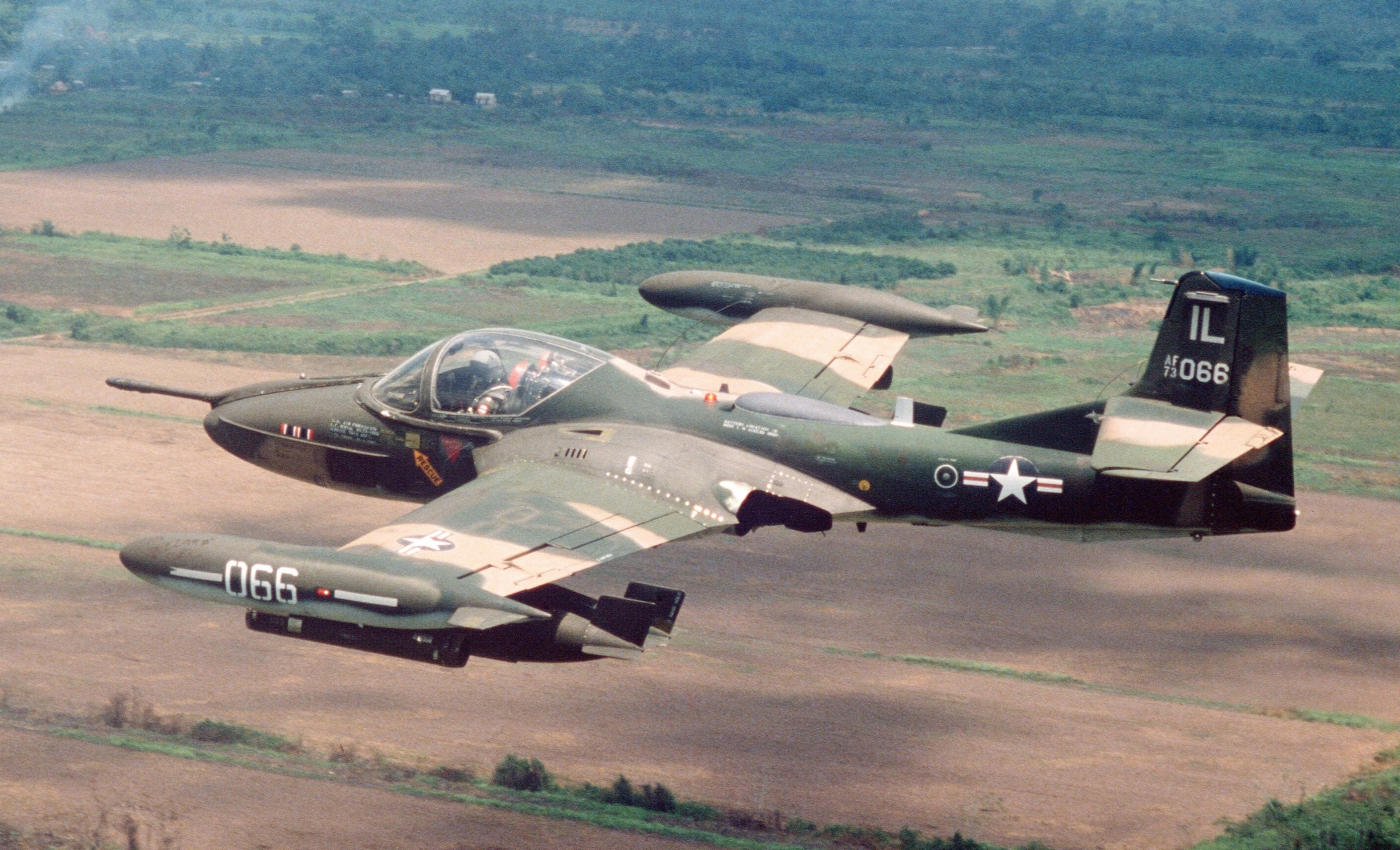
OA-37B Dragonfly of the 169th Airlift Squadron

Many post–World War II era air forces have been reluctant to adopt fixed-wing jet aircraft developed specifically for ground attack. Although close air support and interdiction remain crucial to the modern battlefield, attack aircraft are less glamorous than fighters, while air force pilots and military planners have a certain well-cultivated contempt for "mud-movers". More practically, the cost of operating a specialized ground-attack aircraft is harder to justify when compared with multirole combat aircraft. Jet attack aircraft were designed and employed during the Cold War era, such as the carrier-based nuclear strike Douglas A-3 Skywarrior and North American A-5 Vigilante, while the Grumman A-6 Intruder, F-105 Thunderchief, F-111, F-117 Nighthawk, LTV A-7 Corsair II, Sukhoi Su-25, A-10 Thunderbolt II, Panavia Tornado, AMX, Dassault Étendard, Super Étendard and others were designed specifically for ground-attack, strike, close support and anti-armor work, with little or no air-to-air capability.

Ground attack has increasingly become a task of converted trainers, like the BAE Systems Hawk or Aero L-39 Albatros, and many trainers are built with this task in mind, like the CASA C-101 or the Aermacchi MB-339. Such counter-insurgency aircraft are popular with air forces which cannot afford to purchase more expensive multirole aircraft, or do not wish to risk the few such aircraft they have on light ground attack missions. A proliferation of low intensity conflicts in the post–World War II era has also expanded need for these types of aircraft to conduct counter-insurgency and light ground attack operations.

A primary distinction of post–World War II aviation between the U.S. Army and the U.S. Air Force was that latter had generally been allocated all fixed-wing aircraft, while helicopters were under control of the former; this was governed by the 1948 Key West Agreement. The Army, wishing to have its own resources to support its troops in combat and faced with a lack of Air Force enthusiasm for the ground-attack role, developed the dedicated attack helicopter.

=== Recent history ===
On 17 January 1991, Task Force Normandy began its attack on two Iraqi anti-aircraft missile sites. TF Normandy, under the command of LTC Richard A. "Dick" Cody, consisted of nine AH-64 Apaches, one UH-60 Black Hawk and four Air Force MH-53J Pave Low helicopters. The purpose of this mission was to create a safe corridor through the Iraqi air defense system. The attack was a huge success and cleared the way for the beginning of the Allied bombing campaign of Operation Desert Storm.

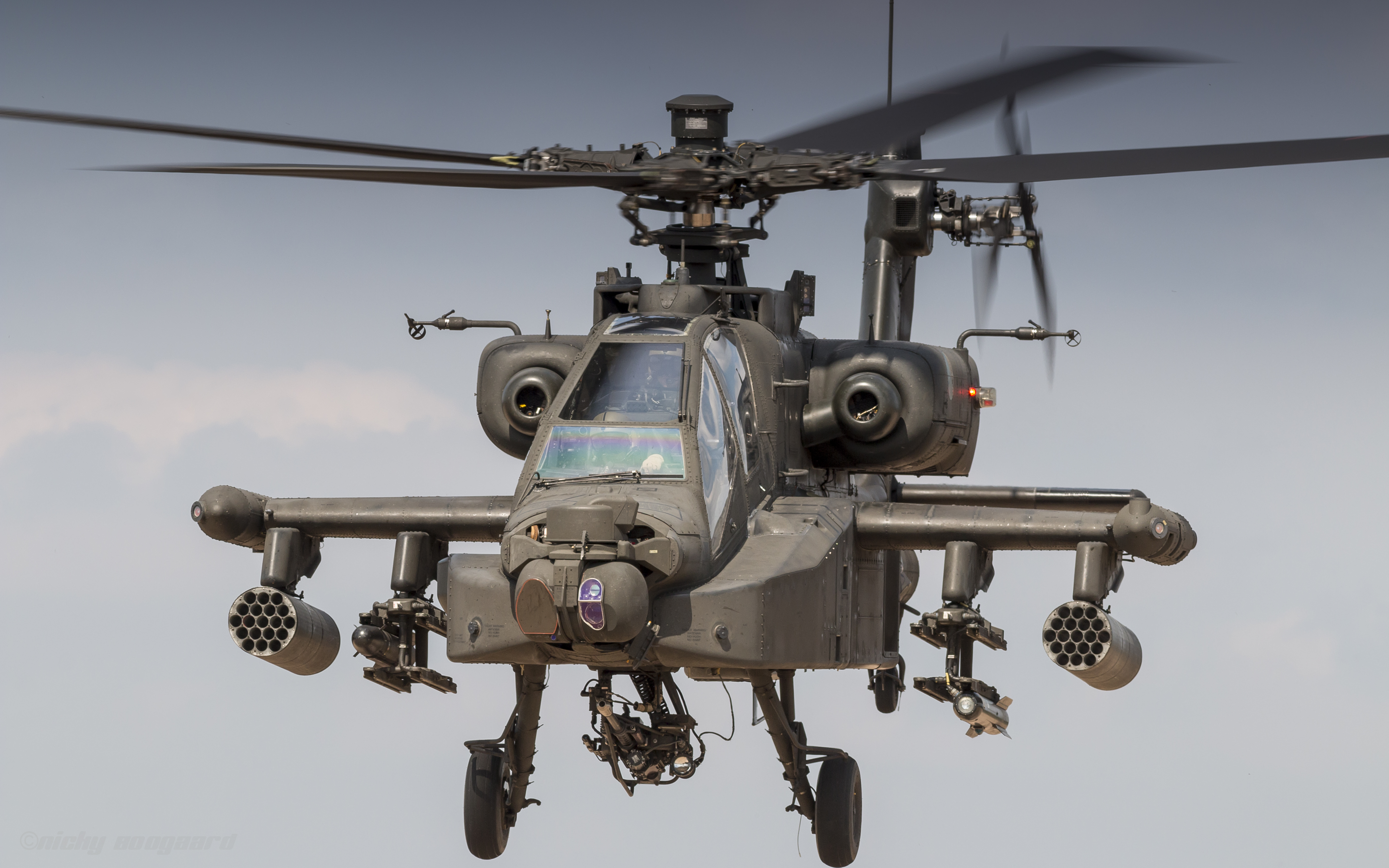
An AH-64D Apache of the Royal Netherlands Air Force

One concern involving the Apache arose when a unit of these helicopters was very slow to deploy during U.S. military involvement in Kosovo. According to the Army Times, the Army is shifting its doctrine to favor ground-attack aircraft over attack helicopters for deep strike attack missions because ground-attack helicopters have proved to be highly vulnerable to small-arms fire; the U.S. Marine Corps has noted similar problems.

In the late 1960s the United States Air Force requested a dedicated close air support (CAS) plane that became the Fairchild Republic A-10 Thunderbolt II. The A-10 was originally conceived as an anti-armor weapon (the A-X program requirements specifically called for an aircraft mounting a large rotary cannon to destroy massed Warsaw Pact armored forces) with limited secondary capability in the interdiction and tactical bombing roles. Today it remains the only dedicated fixed-wing ground-attack aircraft in any U.S. military service. Overall U.S. experience in the Gulf War, Kosovo War, Afghanistan War, and Iraq War has resulted in renewed interest in such aircraft. The U.S. Air Force is currently researching a replacement for the A-10 and started the OA-X program to procure a light attack aircraft. The Soviets' similar Sukhoi Su-25 (Frogfoot) found success in the "flying artillery" role with many air forces. The UK has completely retired the BAE Harrier II in 2011, and the Panavia Tornado dedicated attack-reconnaissance aircraft in 2019. It obtained the F-35 in 2018 and it retains its fleet of Eurofighter Typhoon multirole fighters.

== See also ==
- Air-to-ground weaponry
- Gunship
- Interdictor
- List of attack aircraft
- Pace-Finletter MOU 1952
