= Pace-Finletter MOU 1952 =

The Pace-Finletter MOU of 1952 was a memorandum of understanding (MOU) signed on 4 November 1952 between Secretary of the Air Force Thomas K. Finletter and Secretary of the Army Frank Pace that removed the weight restrictions on helicopters that the United States Army could use. It also widened the range of tasks the Army's helicopters could be used for. However, it also created an arbitrary 5,000 pound weight restriction limit on the Army's ability to fly fixed-wing aircraft. As a result, the U.S. Army today is dependent upon the United States Air Force to purchase and man fixed-wing ground-attack aircraft to fulfill close air support missions.

"...that established a fixed wing weight limit (for the Army) of five thousand pounds empty, but weight restrictions on helicopters were eliminated ..."

== Background ==
One of the consequences of President Harry S Truman creating the Department of Defense was the splitting off of the U.S. Army Air Forces (the U.S. Army Air Corps was disestablished in 1942) from the U.S. Army, and creating the U.S. Air Force. With the Air Force's natural inclination towards Air Superiority and Strategic (i.e. nuclear) priorities, the Army wanted air capabilities of its own. However, this would mean the duplication of some resources between the Army and Air Force. Eventually there was a meeting between Air Force Secretary Thomas K. Finletter and Army Secretary Frank Pace resulted in the Pace-Finletter MOU of 4 November 1952.

The previous Agreement of 2 October 1951 that was not able to resolve issues as the 4 November 1952 MOU did.

This MOU built upon the Key West Agreement.

== The agreement ==
The agreement read:

MEMORANDUM OF UNDERSTANDING RELATING TO ARMY ORGANIC AVIATION

1. The National Security Act of 1947 as amended in 1949 provides, "in general the Army shall include land combat/and service forces and such aviation and water transport as may be organic therein." It is the purpose of this memorandum to delineate in the foregoing quotation the phrase, "such aviation as may be organic therein," in order to ensure that the U.S. Army may employ aircraft necessary for its internal requirements in the conduct of operations on land, without infringement upon the missions assigned to the U.S. Air Force.
2. Army organic aviation will consist of aircraft primarily utilized by the Army within the Army combat zone as an integral part of its components for the purpose of expediting and improving ground combat and logistical procedures, subject, however, to the limitation that such aircraft will not duplicate the functions of the U.S. Air Force in providing the Army, by fixed-wing and rotary-wing type aircraft, close combat support, assault transport and other troop carrier airlift, aerial photography, tactical reconnaissance and interdiction of enemy land power and communications. Army organic aircraft are defined as fixed-wing utility or observation type aircraft with an empty weight of not to exceed 5000 pounds and rotary-wing type aircraft, the total lift and propulsion of which are achieved solely from rotors, designed and utilized for the performance of the following functions; and these functions shall be used by the Army exclusively as a basis for developing Army requirements for the procurement of Army aircraft:
  a. Aerial observation to amplify and supplement other Army methods of observation for the purpose of locating, verifying and evaluating targets, adjusting fire, terrain study, or obtaining information on enemy forces not otherwise obtained by air reconnaissance agencies of the other services; this includes limited aerial photography incident to these purposes.
  b. Control of Army forces.
  c. Command, liaison and courier missions pertinent to the combat zone and training therefore.
  d. Aerial wire laying within the combat zone.
  e. Transportation of Army supplies, equipment, and small units within the combat zone.
  f. Aeromedical evacuation within the combat zone, to include battlefield pickup of casualties, their air transport to initial point of treatment and any subsequent move to hospital facilities within the combat zone.
  g. Artillery and topographic survey.
3. Army organic aircraft will be used by the responsible Army commander as he considers necessary for the discharge of his military mission.
4. Army aircraft as defined in paragraph 2 above may be utilized in peacetime operations and in training for the functions outlined in paragraph 2 above, as required by Army units and activities.
5. The weight limitations on Army fixed-wing aircraft will be subject to review by the Secretary of Defense upon request by the Secretary of the Army or the Secretary of the Air Force as required to keep this limitation realistic in the light of technical developments and assigned missions.
6. Consistent with one of its primary functions, furnishing logistical air support to the Army, the Air Force will provide by fixed-wing or rotary wing aircraft the following airlift; and these functions shall be used by the Air Force exclusively as a basis for developing Air Force requirements for the procurement of Air Force aircraft:
  a. Airlift of Army supplies, equipment, personnel and units from exterior points to points within the combat zone.
  b. Airlift for the evacuation of personnel and materiel from the combat zone.
  c. Airlift for the air movement of troops, supplies and equipment in the assault and subsequent phases of airborne operations.
  d. Aeromedical evacuation for casualties from the initial point of treatment or point of subsequent hospitalization within the combat zone to points outside of the combat zone; and in airborne operations, the evacuation of all casualties from the objective area until such time as ground link-up is attained.
7. For the purpose of this memorandum, the term "combat zone" shall be defined as follows:
  The combat zone comprises that part of the theater of operations required for the conduct of war by the field forces. Its rear boundary is designated by the theater commander and is dependent upon the size of the forces assigned, the nature of the operations contemplated, the character of the lines of communications, the important terrain features, and the enemy capabilities. It may be divided for tactical control into Army group, field Army, Corps, and Division areas; each is controlled by the requirements, it is understood that the combat zone will normally be from 50 to 100 miles in depth.
8. The provisions of this agreement, the impact thereon on future developments, and any major problems incident to the interpretation thereof which may arise shall be made the subject of consultation between the Chiefs of Staff and the Secretaries of the two Services upon request.
9. The provisions of this memorandum are not intended to apply to convertiplane-type aircraft, nor will this agreement be interpreted to prohibit the continuing research, development and testing of such aircraft for the Army.
10. This agreement supersedes the Memorandum of Understanding Between the Secretary of the Army and the Secretary of the Air Force, dated 2 October 1951. All regulations and agreements in conflict with the foregoing will be revised in accordance with the provisions of this memorandum. Nothing contained herein is intended to or shall be construed as modifying, altering or rescinding any of the assigned functions of the Armed Forces (The Key West Agreement, dated 21 April 1948).

/s/ Frank Pace Jr.
Secretary of the Army

/s/ J. Lawton Collins
Chief of Staff, U.S.Army

/s/ Thomas K. Finletter
Secretary of the Air Force

/s/ N. F. Twining

Vice Chief of Staff, U.S. Air Force

== Consequences ==
Some people credit this agreement for freeing the Army to develop the helicopter-based United States Army Aviation Branch established in 1983. From 1947 until 1983, Army Aviation assets were controlled by "proponent branches" based on aircraft and unit type. Beginning in 1941, when the Army Air Corps was re-designated as the Army Air Forces, light, single-engine airplanes were retained by the Army Ground Forces, and designated as "liaison" aircraft assigned to artillery units. As helicopters were introduced into Army aviation, cargo helicopters became under the proponency of the Transportation Corps, and eventually there were units of assault helicopters (Infantry Branch), attack helicopters and observation/scout helicopters (Armor Branch), "aerial rocket artillery" attack helicopters (Field Artillery Branch), observation/reconnaissance airplanes (Military Intelligence Branch), aerial medical evacuation units (Medical Service Corps), and signals/electronic intelligence airplanes (Signal Corps).

Prior to 1983 potential Army Aviators were commissioned into a "basic branch" (i.e., Infantry Armor, Field Artillery, etc.), completed that branches' officer basic course, and subsequently requested orders to flight training (usually after at least one year of "branch qualifying" service in a unit of that basic branch). Upon designation as an Army Aviator, the new pilot was usually assigned to a unit under his "owning" branches' proponency, completed any required aircraft transition training, and began his service in Army Aviation. Warrant officer aviators were appointed into the Army "at large" (i.e., without specific branch designation). However, the career management was under the cognizance of the Army Warrant Officer Aviation Branch, which was a purely administrative branch with no distinctive branch insignia, aircraft or tactical units under its proponency. (until 2004 all Army warrant officers wore the Warrant Officer Branch insignia of a spread eagle and wreath design).

Other people blame this agreement for allowing the Air Force to ignore the needs of ground attack support, other than the Fairchild Republic A-10 Thunderbolt II.

The Air Force had tried to retire and/or transfer to the Reserves its entire A-10 fleet, replacing them with the General Dynamics F-16 Fighting Falcon, just before the First Gulf War. The First Gulf War proved the value of the A-10 in the close air support role, while also showing the limitations of the F-16 as a CAS aircraft.

== See also ==
- Attack aircraft
- Close air support
- Johnson-McConnell agreement of 1966
- Key West Agreement of 1948
