= Johnson-McConnell agreement of 1966 =

US Army and Air Force agreement on aircraft programs

The Johnson-McConnell agreement of 1966 was an agreement between United States Army Chief of Staff General Harold K. Johnson and United States Air Force Chief of Staff General John P. McConnell on 6 April 1966. The U.S. Army agreed to give up its fixed-wing tactical airlift aircraft, while the U.S. Air Force relinquished its claim to most forms of rotary wing aircraft. The most immediate effect was the transfer of Army DHC-4 Caribou aircraft to the Air Force.

== Background ==
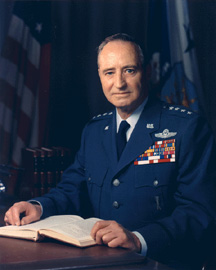
General John P. McConnell, USAF Chief of Staff

The value of tactical air transport had been demonstrated in World War II, proving especially valuable in mountainous and jungle regions of the China-Burma-India and Southwest Pacific theaters. In the 1950s, the U.S. Air Force recognized this, and emphasised centralized management and control of airlift resources. At the same time, Army theorists considered the possibility of employing aircraft in the traditional roles of cavalry. In the Army's concept, aircraft were responsible to and under the command of the ground commanders. From the Air Force perspective,

The Army is not capitalising on the inherent flexibility of air power. It still wants to use aircraft as artillery pieces having them on call at all levels of command.

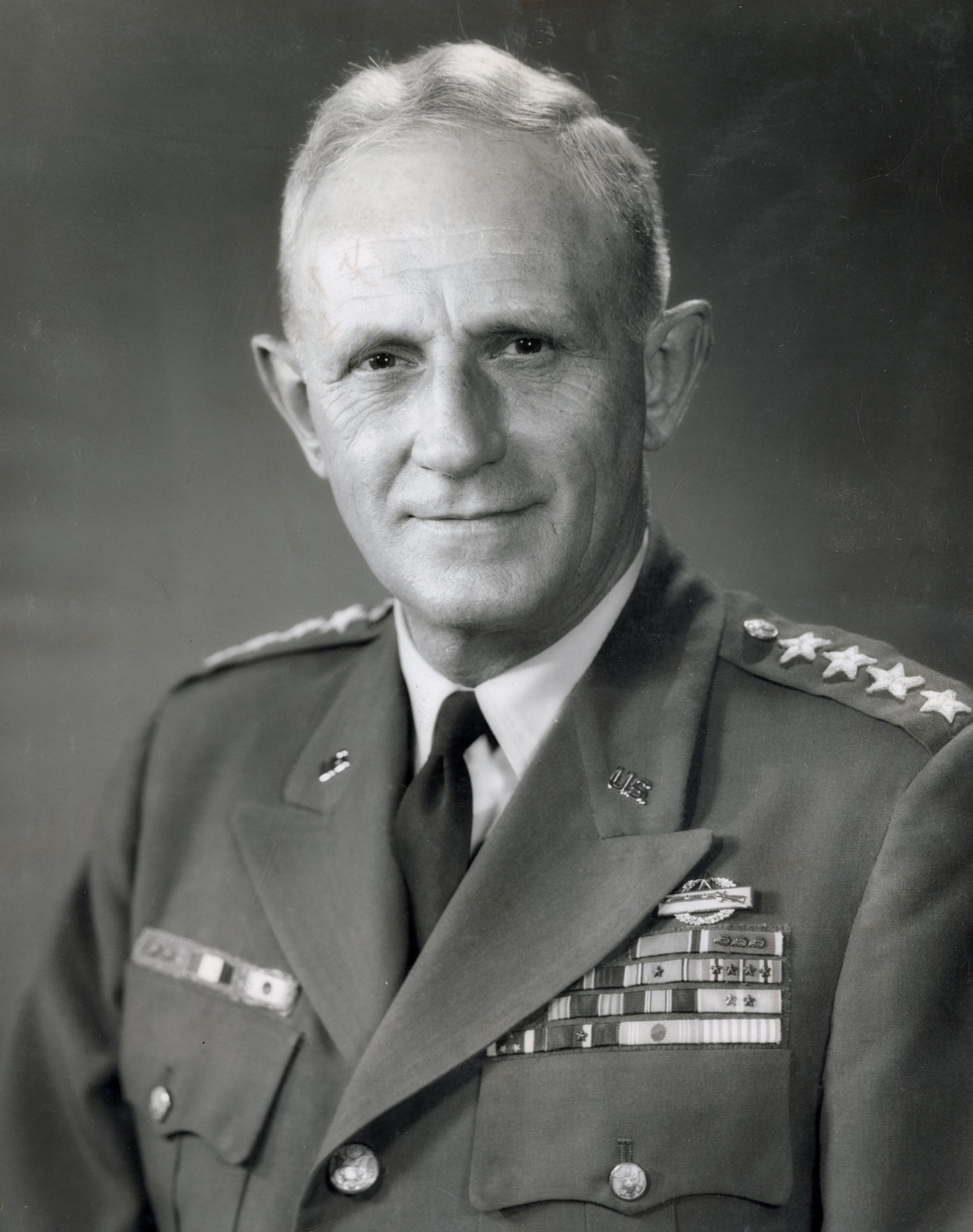
General Harold K. Johnson, U.S. Army Chief of Staff

By 1960, the U.S. Army had 5,500 aircraft, and planned to acquire over 250 CV-2 Caribou aircraft (de Havilland Canada DHC-4 Caribou). The Army's 1962 Howze Board strongly endorsed the airmobility concept, calling for the creation of air assault divisions equipped with organic aircraft, supported by air transport brigades equipped with heavy helicopters and Caribou transports. To the Air Force, this sounded suspiciously like the Army creating a tactical air force of its own.

The U.S. Air Force opposed the introduction of Caribou aircraft to Vietnam, arguing that the C-123 Provider could carry twice the payload over three times the distance. However, the difference between the two aircraft narrowed under operational conditions, since fuel had to be traded off against payload, and the C-123 required 1,750 feet (530 m) of runway for take-off, as opposed to the Caribou's 1,020 feet (310 m). Once in Vietnam, the Caribou's ability to operate into short, unimproved strips soon proved its worth. Starting in July 1962, Caribous began flying two or three sorties per day into Lao Bao, a remote camp that was inaccessible to C-123s. By the end of 1965, there were 88 Caribou aircraft in Vietnam, and the Army was considering a proposal to procure 120 CV-7 Buffalo aircraft – something the Air Force viewed as a costly duplication of the C-123.

In 1966, the U.S. Air Force began to deploy CH-3 helicopters to Vietnam, on the "informal understanding" that "the Air Force would not attempt to deliver supplies to the Army by helicopter" but "critical shortages of Chinooks temporarily ended doctrinal rigidity". Air Force helicopters found themselves employed on a variety of tasks requiring heavy helicopters beyond their intended role in special air warfare.

== Agreement ==
In late 1965, private negotiations began between Generals McConnell and Johnson over the transfer of Caribou and Buffalo aircraft to the Air Force. These were encouraged by the Chairman of the Joint Chiefs of Staff, General Earle Wheeler, who wished to avoid involving the Secretary of Defense, Robert McNamara, or the Joint Chiefs of Staff (where the other two services might exert their influence).

The text of the agreement, formally signed by McConnell and Johnson on 6 April 1966, read:

The Chief of Staff, U.S. Army, and the Chief of Staff, U.S. Air Force, have reached an understanding on the control and employment of certain types of fixed and rotary wing aircraft and are individually and jointly agreed as follows:

a. The Chief of Staff, U.S. Army, agrees to relinquish all claims for CV-2 and CV-7 aircraft and for future fixed-wing aircraft designed for tactical airlift. These assets now in the Army inventory will be transferred to the Air Force. (CSA and CSAF agree that this does not apply to the administrative mission support fixed wing aircraft.)

b. The Chief of Staff, U.S. Air Force, agrees:

1. To relinquish all claims for helicopters and follow-on rotary wing aircraft which are designed and operated for intratheater movement, fire support, supply and resupply of Army Forces and those Air Force control elements assigned to DASC and subordinate thereto. (CSA and CSAF agree that this does not include rotary wing aircraft employed by Air Force SAW [Special Air Warfare] and SAR [Search and Rescue] forces and rotary wing administrative mission aircraft.) (CSA and CSAF agree that the Army and Air Force will jointly continue to develop VTOL aircraft. Dependent on the evolution of this type aircraft, methods of employment and control will be matters for continuing joint consideration by the Army and Air Force.)
2. That in cases of operational need, the CV-2 and CV-7, and C-123 type aircraft performing supply, resupply or troop-lift functions in the field army area, may be attached to the subordinate tactical echelons of the field army (corps, division, or subordinate commander), as determined by the appropriate joint/unified commander.
3. To retain the CV-2 and CV-7 aircraft in the Air Force structure and to consult with the Chief of Staff, U.S. Army, prior to changing the force levels of, or replacing these aircraft.
4. To consult with the Chief of Staff, U.S. Army, in order to arrive at take-off, landing and load carrying characteristics of follow-on fixed wing aircraft to meet the needs of the Army for supply, resupply, and troop movement functions.

c. The Chief of Staff, U.S. Army, and the Chief of Staff, U.S. Air Force, jointly agree:

1. To revise all Service doctrinal statements, manuals, and other material in variance with the substance and spirit of this agreement.
2. That the necessary actions resulting from this agreement will be completed by 1 January 1967.

J. P. McConnell, USAF
Chief of Staff

Harold K. Johnson
Chief of Staff

General, USA

== Outcome ==
The agreement was not warmly received by either service. Many Army officers felt that the Army had traded a real and valuable capability (the Caribous) for "empty guarantees of the status quo in helicopters". For its part, the Air Force was now responsible for manning and funding an aircraft that it had long opposed in return for renouncing rotary winged aircraft. Should technological progress ever favor such aircraft, then the Air Force would be in serious trouble.

In the short term, the agreement ushered in an era of "lukewarm cooperation" between the two services, and relief for the Army's critical pilot shortage; but the implications stretched far into the future. Once the war in Vietnam ended, the Air Force soon transferred all the C-7s and C-123s to the Air National Guard and Air Force Reserve. The Advanced Medium STOL Transport project was eventually cancelled, the Air Force arguing that surface-to-air missiles made tactical airlift too dangerous.

== See also ==
- Key West Agreement of 1948
- Pace-Finletter MOU 1952
