= Key West Agreement =

US Department of Defense policy

The Key West Agreement is the colloquial name for the policy paper Functions of the Armed Forces and the Joint Chiefs of Staff drafted by James V. Forrestal, the first United States Secretary of Defense. Its most prominent feature is an outline for the division of air assets between the Army, Navy, and the newly created Air Force which, with modifications, continues to provide the basis for the division of these assets in the U.S. military today.

The basic outline for the document was agreed upon at a meeting of the United States service chiefs that took place from March 11 to March 14, 1948, in Key West, Florida, and was finalized after subsequent meetings in Washington, D.C. President Harry S. Truman approved the agreement on April 21, 1948, which was revised in 1954 by the Dwight D. Eisenhower administration.

== Background ==
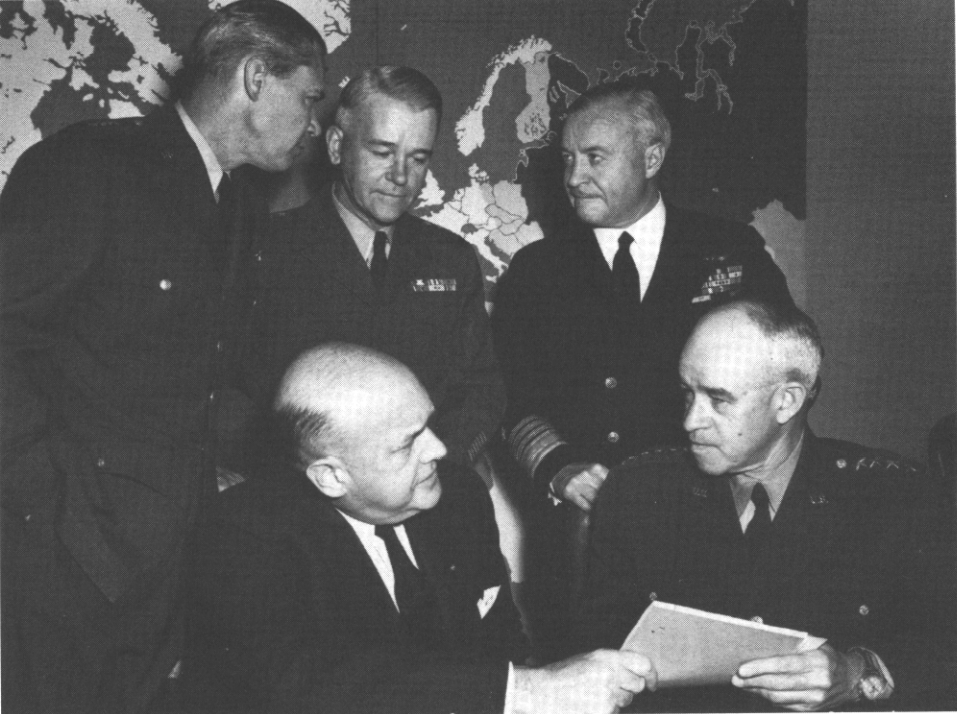
The Joint Chiefs of Staff meet the press. Secretary of Defense Louis Johnson (seated, left), confers with General Omar N. Bradley (seated, right), Chairman of the Joint Chiefs of Staff, at an informal press conference. Standing left to right are: General Hoyt S. Vandenberg, Chief of Staff, USAF; General J. Lawton Collins, Chief of Staff, USA; and Admiral Forrest P. Sherman, Chief of Naval Operations, USN.

The Key West Agreement is a revised version of a collection of documents approved by President Harry S. Truman, and the more popular version as well. Initially, Secretary James Forrestal told General Omar N. Bradley—shortly after Bradley became Chief of Staff of the Army in February 1948—that the large aircraft carrier had already been approved and would be built. Forrestal nevertheless concluded that the time had come to decide the basic roles and missions of aviation in each service and which branch would control which assets. On March 11, 1948, he assembled the Joint Chiefs of Staff at Key West to determine the roles and missions. As basic guidance, Forrestal demanded that the three services each recognize the need for mutual support of each other’s legal missions.

According to Forrestal, the Joint Chiefs of Staff reached basic agreement that the Navy (including the United States Marine Corps) would maintain a separate Naval Aviation force – to include the 65,000-ton "super-carrier" and nuclear bombs that could be transported on naval aircraft – provided that the Navy would not develop a separate strategic air force. The Air Force recognized the right and need for the Navy to participate in an all-out air campaign and to attack inland enemy targets, for example air fields from which hostile aircraft might be launched to attack a fleet. The formal agreements of the Joint Chiefs of Staff were subsequently approved by Truman on April 21 and issued under the title of Functions of the Armed Forces and the Joint Chiefs of Staff.

In turn, Truman revoked Executive Order 9877, in which he prescribed the primary functions and responsibilities of the Armed Forces, and Forrestal issued the “functions paper” in its stead on April 21. The paper, which became known as the Key West Agreement, reaffirmed primary service responsibilities and assigned secondary or “collateral” missions. A memorandum formally recording these understandings was sent to the Secretary of Defense by the Joint Chiefs of Staff on April 29. After amending one paragraph that dealt with research and development, the Secretary of Defense formally approved it on July 1.

== Functions ==
Less than a year after Truman’s executive order was issued, the Key West Agreement listed service functions in greater detail and distinguished between primary and collateral functions as illustrated by the following list of Air Force functions:

- Gain/maintain air superiority
- Air defense of the United States
- Strategic air warfare
- Interdiction of enemy land power and communications
- Close combat and logistical air support
- Intelligence (including tactical intelligence) and aerial photography
- Airlift, air transport and resupply, and support for airborne and amphibious operations
- Interdict enemy sea power
- Antisubmarine warfare and shipping protection
- Aerial mine-laying

== Consequences ==
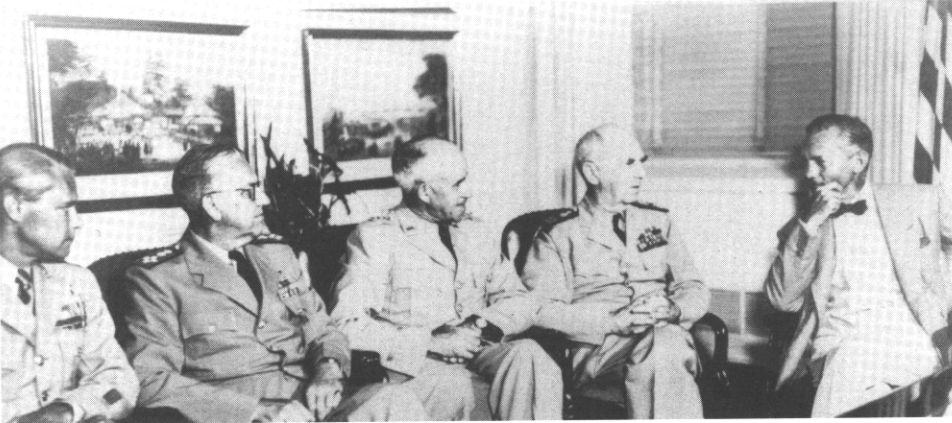
Secretary of Defense James V. Forrestal in conference with the Joint Chiefs, 1948. Left to right: General Hoyt S. Vandenberg, USAF; Admiral Louis E. Denfeld, USN, General Omar N. Bradley, USA; and Fleet Admiral William D. Leahy, USN.

From the Army’s perspective, close air support (CAS) is one of the primary support functions that the U.S. Air Force provides to Army combat operations. The Key West Agreement originally delineated this function. This agreement integrated the Armed Forces into an “efficient team of land, naval, and air forces,” and within that arrangement the Air Force was given a primary mission to furnish close combat and logistical air support to the Army, to include air lift, support, and resupply of airborne operations, aerial photography, tactical reconnaissance, and interdiction of enemy land power and communications. Historically, CAS has been a function assigned to Air Force fixed wing aircraft. Assignment of CAS responsibility to the Air Force grew out of the Key West Agreement. Since that time, however, the nature of combat and weaponry has evolved to a high level of technological sophistication. This was illustrated in combat experiences, as in Just Cause in Panama and the Persian Gulf War.

== Key points ==
- The Navy would be allowed to retain its own combat air arm "...to conduct air operations as necessary for the accomplishment of objectives in a naval campaign..."
- The Army would be allowed to retain aviation assets for reconnaissance and medical evacuation purposes.
- The Air Force would have control of all strategic air assets, and most tactical and logistic functions as well.

== Legacy ==
The Key West Agreement was therefore vital in keeping the roles and missions of naval aviation under the control of the Navy. The agreement gave the Navy written verification that it controlled all aspects of its aviation arm, from the roles and missions, research and development, and utilization in combat. Though historians often cite the passage of the National Security Act and the Revolt of the Admirals as the key points in saving naval aviation, the agreement was just as important in the keeping land- and carrier-based naval aviation from being incorporated into the Air Force. Without the Key West Agreement, naval aviation might have developed under Air Force control during the Cold War years. The terms of the Key West Agreement were considered a tremendous victory for the Navy. The Navy in the Key West Conference stopped the Air Force from controlling the roles and missions of naval aviation.

== See also ==
- United States Army Air Forces
- National Security Act of 1947
- Pace-Finletter MOU 1952. However, the 1952 MOU did build upon the Key West Agreement.
- Johnson-McConnell agreement of 1966

== Primary sources ==
- Wolf, Richard I. (1987). The United States Air Force: Basic Documents on Roles and Missions. Office of Air Force, United States Air Force, Washington D.C., p. 151.
