= Charles Thomas =

Charles, Charlie or Chuck Thomas may refer to:

== Military ==
- Charles Thomas, Prince of Vaudémont (1670–1704), fieldmarshal in the Austrian army
- Charles Thomas, Prince of Löwenstein-Wertheim-Rosenberg (1783–1849), Austrian officer during the Napoleonic Wars
- Charles Thomas (quartermaster) (1797–1878), acting quartermaster general during the American Civil War
- Charles W. Thomas (quartermaster, born 1833) (1833–1882), son of the acting quartermaster general
- Charles L. Thomas (Medal of Honor, 1865) (1843–1923), United States Army soldier awarded the Medal of Honor for heroism
- Charles L. Thomas (1920–1980), United States Army officer posthumously awarded the Medal of Honor
- Charles Mitchell Thomas (1846–1908), admiral in the United States Navy
- Charles W. Thomas (captain) (1903–1973), officer in the United States Coast Guard
- Charles Thomas (Canadian admiral) (1936–2022), Canadian admiral
- Charles W. Thomas (general) (born 1944), retired U.S. Army officer and defense industry executive

== Politics and government ==
- Charles Thomas (Delaware politician) (1790–1848), American lawyer and governor of Delaware
- Charles R. Thomas (1827–1891), American politician and representative from North Carolina
- Charles R. Thomas (1861–1931), American politician and representative from North Carolina
- Charles S. Thomas (Virginia politician) (died 1894), American politician, member of the Virginia House of Delegates
- Charles G. Thomas (1835–1916), American politician, Wisconsin state assemblyman
- Charles M. Thomas (judge) (c. 1844/1846–1895), justice of the Dakota Territorial Supreme Court
- Charles S. Thomas (1849–1934), American politician, U.S. senator and governor of Colorado
- Charles W. Thomas (politician) (1860–1907), American politician and state representative/senator from Pennsylvania
- Charles Wimbledon Thomas (1862–1948), Fijian businessman and politician
- Charles John Howell Thomas (1874–1943), English civil servant and diplomat
- Charles Thomas (Secretary of the Navy) (1897–1983), U.S. Secretary of the Navy
- Charlie Thomas (politician) (1915–1976), politician, New Brunswick member of Canadian Parliament
- Charles H. Thomas (diplomat) (1934–1998), United States ambassador to Hungary
- Charles Graham Thomas (1879–937), American politician and businessman, member of the Texas House of Representatives
- Charles C. Thomas (politician) (born c. 1970), American politician, member of the North Carolina General Assembly of 2007–08 and chief of staff to the Speaker of North Carolina House of Representatives

== Science and technology ==
- Charles Xavier Thomas (1785–1870), French inventor and entrepreneur
- Charles Thomas (mine agent) (1794–1868), Cornish mining innovator
- Charles Thomas Thomas (1820–1867), English-Canadian stone carver and builder
- Charles Allen Thomas (1900–1982), American chemist and businessman
- Charles W. Thomas (psychologist) (1926–1990), African American psychologist

== Sports ==
- Charles Thomas (umpire) (1840–1923), South African cricket umpire
- Charlie Thomas (rugby union) (1864–1948), Welsh international rugby player
- Charles Thomas (rugby union), English international rugby union player
- Charles Thomas (American football) (1871–1920), American football player and coach
- Charles Thomas (footballer) (1876–1935), Druids F.C. and Wales international footballer
- Charles H. Thomas (sports executive) (1876–1968), one-time president of the Chicago Cubs
- Charles Thomas (sprinter) (1931–2015), American sprinter
- Chuck Thomas (American football) (born 1960), professional American football player
- Charles Thomas (basketball, born 1969), American professional basketball player
- Charles Thomas (baseball) (born 1978), left fielder in Major League Baseball
- Charles Thomas (basketball, born 1986), American professional basketball player
- Charlie Thomas (running back) (born 1948), American football running back
- Charlie Thomas (linebacker) (born 2000), American football linebacker
- Charlie Thomas (Australian footballer) (born 2003), Australian rules footballer
- Charlie Thomas, former owner of the Houston Rockets
- Charley Thomas (baseball), Negro leagues baseball player

== Other uses ==
- Charles Thomas, Prince of Löwenstein-Wertheim-Rochefort (1714–1789)
- Charles John Thomas (1832–1919), director of the Mormon Tabernacle Choir
- Charles Armand Étienne Thomas (1857–1892), French painter
- Charles Drayton Thomas (1867–1953), British Methodist minister and spiritualist
- Charles Thomas (historian) (1928–2016), professor of Cornish Studies at Exeter University
- Charles Thomas (architect) (1928–2022), architect from Christchurch, New Zealand
- Charlie Thomas (musician) (1937–2023), American rhythm and blues singer, most notably in The Drifters
- Charlie Thomas (director) (born 1961), British documentary maker and sports presenter
- Charles C. Thomas (publisher), medical publisher and owner of the Dana–Thomas House

== See also ==
- Charley Thomas (born 1986), Canadian curler
