= Army Intelligence =

Army Intelligence may refer to:

- a military intelligence agency
- Army Intelligence Service, of Argentina
- Australian Army Intelligence Corps
- Indonesian Army Intelligence Centre
- Army Intelligence (Singapore)
- Military Intelligence Corps (United States Army)
  - G-2 (intelligence)
  - U.S. Army Intelligence Agency (1967–1977)
  - United States Army Intelligence Center
  - United States Army Intelligence Command (1965–1974)
  - United States Army Intelligence and Security Command

== Other uses ==
- Renaissance Man (film), 1994, released as Army Intelligence in Australia

== See also ==
- Military Intelligence (disambiguation)
- Directorate of Military Intelligence (India)
- Irish Military Intelligence Service
- New Zealand Intelligence Corps
- Intelligence Corps (United Kingdom)
