= General Thomas =

General Thomas may refer to:

== United Kingdom ==
- Sir Godfrey Thomas, 9th Baronet (1856–1919), British brigadier general
- Ivor Thomas (British Army officer) (1893–1972), British general
- Jerry Thomas (Royal Marines officer) (fl. 1970s–2010s), Royal Marines major general
- John Wellesley Thomas (1822–1908), British lieutenant general
- Lechmere Thomas (1897–1981), British major general
- Noel Thomas (1915–1983), British general
- Owen Thomas (politician) (1858–1923), British Army brigadier general
- Walter Babington Thomas (1919–2017), British major general

== United States ==
- Allen Thomas (1830–1907), Confederate States Army general
- Arthur S. Thomas (1935–2001), U.S. Air Force general
- Bryan M. Thomas (1836–1905), Confederate States Army general
- Charles Thomas (1797–1878), U.S. brevet major general in the American Civil War
- Charles W. Thomas (general), U.S. Army general
- Edward Lloyd Thomas (1825–1898), Confederate States Army general
- Edward W. Thomas (fl. 1990s–2020s), U.S. Air Force major general
- Gary L. Thomas (general) (born 1962), U.S. Marine Corps four-star general.
- George Henry Thomas (1816–1870), U.S. or Union Army general
- Gerald C. Thomas (1894–1984), U.S. Marine Corps general
- Henry Goddard Thomas (1837–1897), Union Army general
- James Thomas (Governor of Maryland) (1785–1845), U.S. brevet major general in the War of 1812
- Jett Thomas (1776–1817), Georgia State Militia major general
- John Thomas (American general) (1724–1776), American Revolutionary War general
- Jon T. Thomas (born 1967) U.S. Air Force lieutenant general
- Lawrence S. Thomas III (fl. 1970s–2000s), U.S. Air Force general
- Lorenzo Thomas (1804–1875), U.S. Army general
- Randal E. Thomas, retired U.S. Army general
- Raymond A. Thomas (born 1958), U.S. Army general
- Samuel Russell Thomas (1840–1903), Union Army general
- Stephen Thomas (Medal of Honor) (1809–1903), Union Army general

== Other ==
- Georg Thomas (1890–1946), German general
- Wilhelm Thomas (1892–1976), German general

== See also ==
- Thomas (surname)
- Attorney General Thomas (disambiguation)
