= Doris Allen =

Doris Allen may refer to:

- Doris "Lucki" Allen (1927–2024), specialist in the US Army
- Doris Twitchell Allen (1901–2002), American psychologist and founder of Children's International Summer Villages
- Doris Allen (politician) (1936–1999), California politician
- Doris Allen (singer), 1950s and 1960s American singer
