= Edmund R. Thompson =

United States Army general officer (1930–2019)

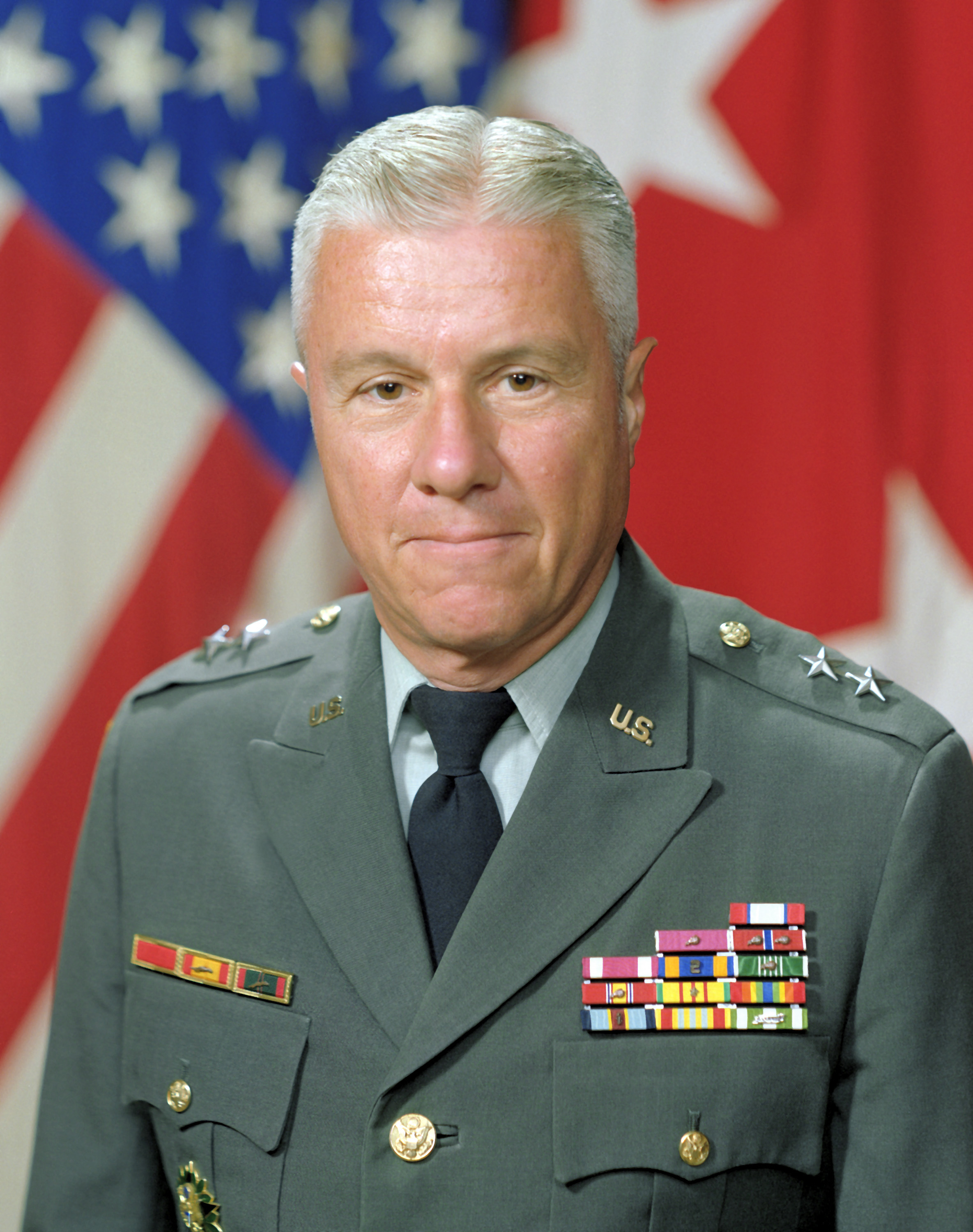
Major General Edmund R. Thompson

Edmund Randall Thompson (29 May 1930 – 14 July 2019) was a United States Army general officer.

== Military career ==
General Thompson was born on 29 May 1930 at New Rochelle, New York. Upon graduation from the United States Military Academy at West Point in 1952, his first assignment was duty with the 4th Field Artillery Battalion, Camp Carson, Colorado.

From April 1954 to February 1957 he served in command and staff assignments with the 77th Field Artillery Battalion and served one year as Aide-de-Camp to the Commanding General, 1st Cavalry Division. He attended Syracuse University in 1957 and 1958, receiving an M.A. degree in Geography. He was assigned as an instructor at the United States Military Academy from 1959 through 1962. While there, Thompson completed a dissertation entitled The Nature of Military Geography: A Preliminary Survey and was conferred a Ph.D. degree in Geography by Syracuse University in 1962. He performed advisory duties in both Cambodia and Vietnam during 1963 and 1964, and from August 1964 to June 1965, he attend the United States Army Command and General Staff College, Ft Leavenworth, Kansas.

In June 1965 he was assigned to the Office, Assistant Chief of Staff for Intelligence, Department of the Army, and subsequently served one year as Commander, US Army Field Detachment "O". In November 1968 he became G2, 25th Infantry Division in Vietnam, and served from September to November 1969 as Special Assistant to the Assistant Chief of Staff, G2, US Army Vietnam.

General Thompson was then assigned to the Office of the Assistant Secretary of Defense (International Security Affairs) until July 1970 and he attended the Industrial College of the Armed Forces from August 1970 to June 1971. He commanded the 116th Military Intelligence Group from June 1971 until October 1972, and served in the Office of the Deputy Chief of Staff for Personnel, Department of the Army, from then until June 1975.

He was promoted to Brigadier General on 6 June 1975 and assigned to the Office of the Assistant Chief of Staff, Intelligence, Department of the Army.

From 1 July 1975 to 29 August 1977, Thompson, then a Brigadier General, was commanding general in the U.S. Army Intelligence Agency. From 29 August 1977 to 1 November 1981, Thompson, then a Major General, served as the Assistant Chief of Staff for Intelligence at the Department of the Army headquarters. Between 1982 and 1984 he was the Deputy Director for Management and Operations of the Defense Intelligence Agency.

General Thompson is a member of the Military Intelligence Hall of Fame, and recipient of many military medals including the Distinguished Service Medal, Legion of Merit and Defense Distinguished Service Cross.

General Thompson died in Kennebunk, Maine on 14 July 2019 and was interred at Arlington National Cemetery on 10 December 2019.
