= United States Army Intelligence Command =

US Army Intelligence Command
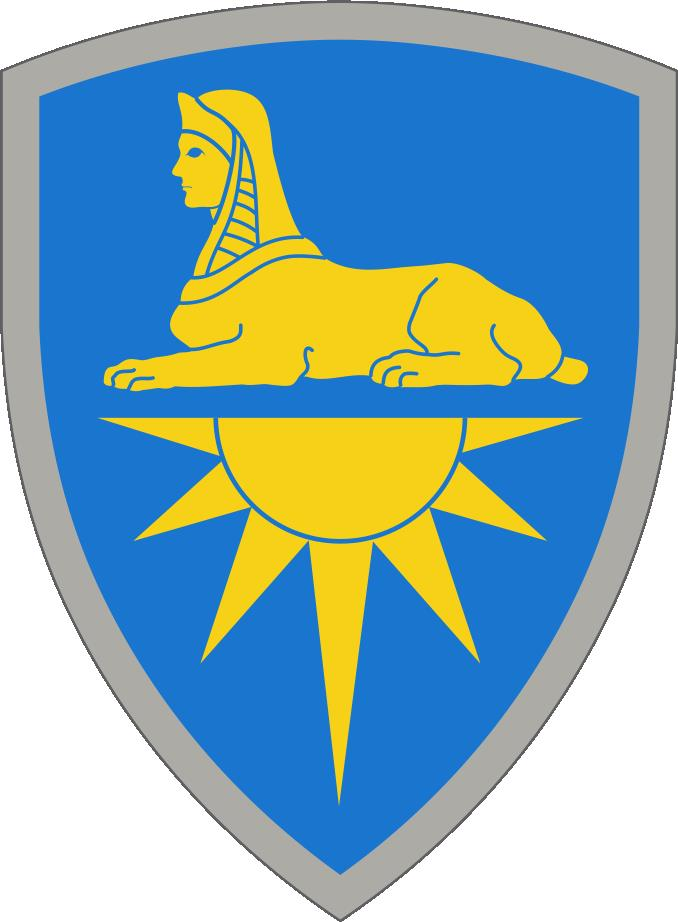
- Active: 1965–1974
- Garrison/HQ: Fort Holabird; Fort Meade, Maryland

The United States Army Intelligence Command (USAINTC) was a unit of the US Army formed in 1965 at Fort Holabird to have a centralized command over all Counter Intelligence units in the Continental United States (CONUS). A basic function of USAINTC was to conduct background checks for sensitive government positions. By creating the Defense Central Index of Investigations database they cut the time to accomplish a background check from 97 to 31 days. One of their missions was to gather information to support the use of Federal troops to restore order during civil disturbances, such as urban riots. The command started collecting information on the growing US anti-war movement. When the domestic spying became public in 1970, the backlash quickly ended the program. In 1973 in preparation for the end of USAINTC, it was moved to Fort Meade, Maryland. In 1974, the Army inactivated USAINTC and replaced it with the U.S. Army Intelligence Agency (USAINTA).

== Commanding Officers ==
MG Charles F. Leonard, Jr.— 01 Jan 65 to 21 Nov 65

MG Elias C. Townsend— 24 Nov 65 to 04 Jun 67

MG William H. Blakefield— 05 Jun 67 to 22 Feb 70

BG Jack C. Matthews— 28 Feb 70 to 31 Jan 71

BG Orlando C. Epp— 01 Feb 71 to 18 Jun 72

COL James R. Waldie— 19 Jun 72 to 30 Sep 74

COL N. Dean Schanche— 01 Oct 72 to 30 Jun 74
