= George J. Walker =

United States Army general

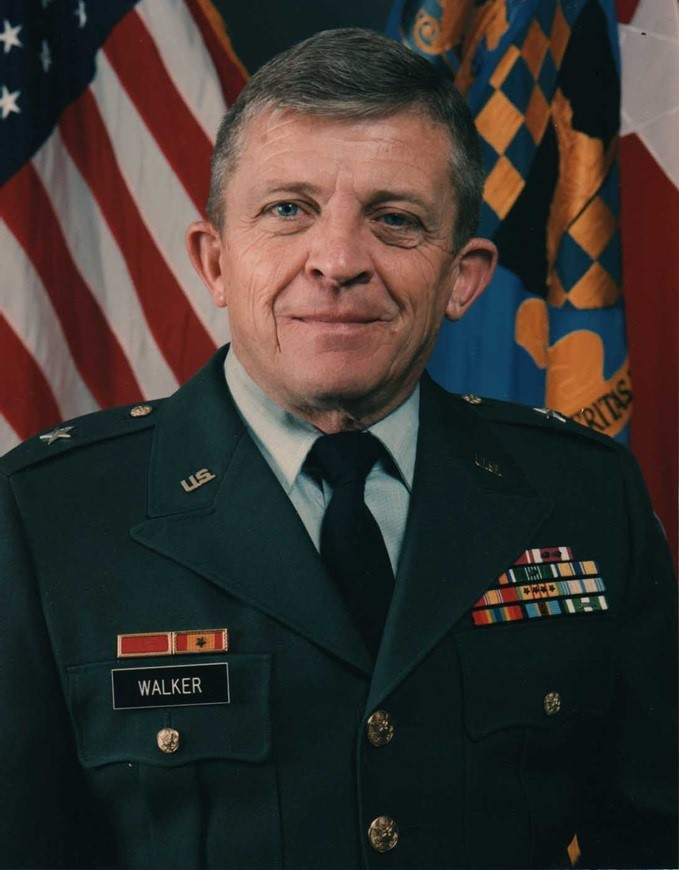
- Born: 16 January 1934; Rome, Georgia, US
- Died: 11 April 2005 (aged 71); Niceville, Florida, US
- Burial place: Arlington National Cemetery
- Military career
- Allegiance: United States of America
- Branch: US Army
- Service years: 1954–1989
- Rank: Brigadier General
- Conflicts: Vietnam War

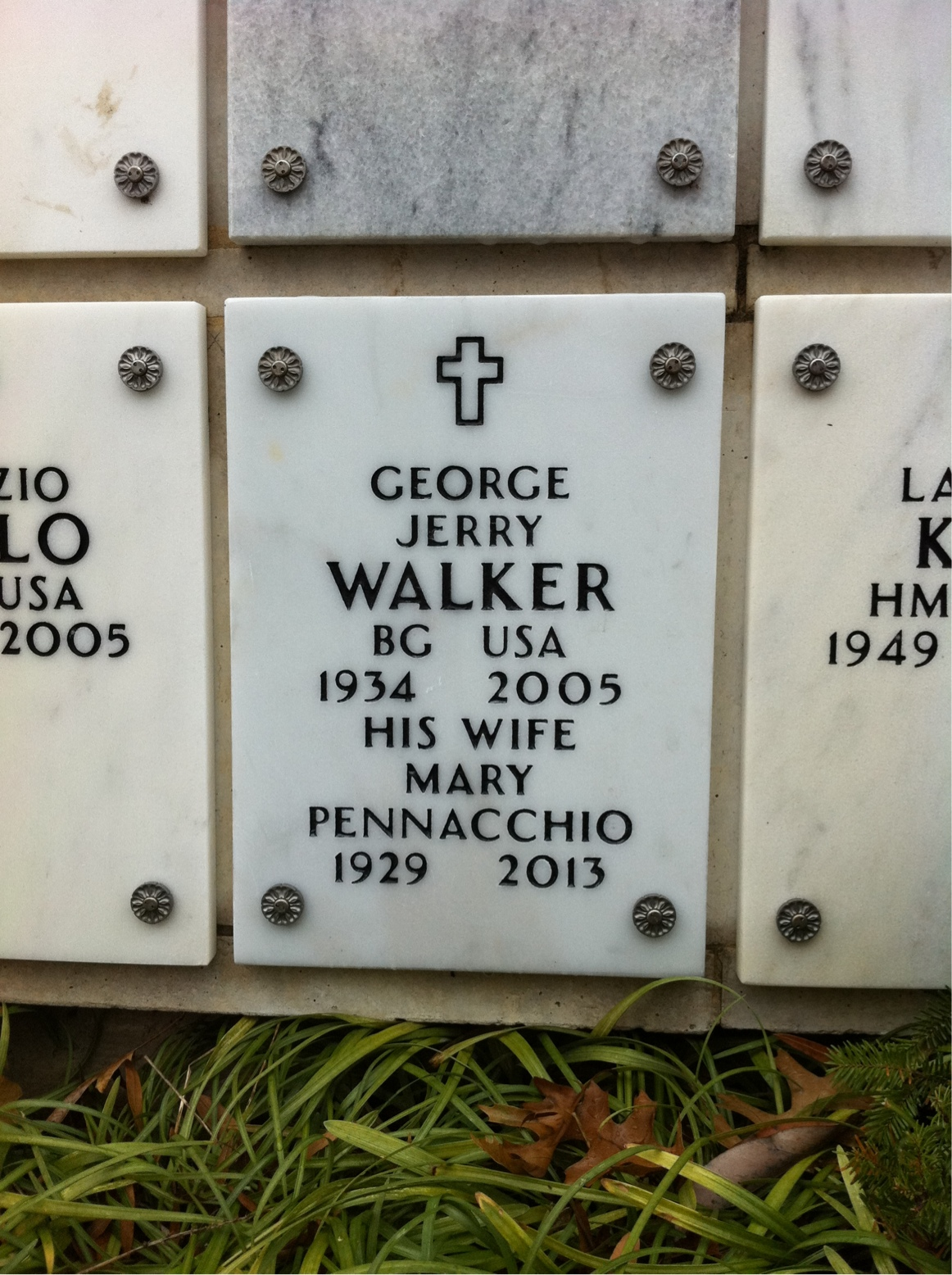
Grave at Arlington National Cemetery

George Jerry Walker (16 January 1934 – 11 April 2005) served as an officer in the U.S. Army, including a stint in 1985 as Deputy Commanding General of the United States Army Intelligence and Security Command (INSCOM).

== Early life and military career ==
Born in Rome, Georgia, Walker was a graduate of Mercer University in Macon, Georgia and received a master's degree in political science from Auburn University in Montgomery, Alabama. General Walker's military service began when he entered the US Army Reserves in 1954 and served in the Reserves as an enlisted soldier until his graduation from Mercer University at which time he was commissioned a second lieutenant and entered active duty in November 1956. General Walker served six years in the Quartermaster Corps of the Army and the remainder of his active service in Military Intelligence. He served tours in France, Germany, Korea and Vietnam as well as stateside assignments at Seneca Army Depot, Romulus, New York; Fort Holabird, Maryland; Fort Leavenworth, Kansas; Fort Huachuca, Arizona; Fort Hood, Texas; Washington, DC; and Fort McPherson, Georgia.

Walker was a graduate of the Army Command and General Staff College and the Air War College. He served as the Assistant Chief of Staff, G2 of the 3rd Armored Division in Germany and as the Assistant Chief of Staff, G2 of III Corps at Fort Hood, Texas. He served as Chief of Staff and later as Deputy Commandant of the U.S. Army Intelligence Center and School at Fort Huachuca, Arizona and as Chief of Staff and later Deputy Commanding General of the Army's Intelligence and Security Command in Washington, DC. His final assignment immediately prior to retirement from the Army in 1989 was as Director of Intelligence/J2 of Forces Command in Atlanta, Georgia.

== Retirement ==
After retirement from the Army, Ret. General Walker and his wife resided in Huntsville, Alabama where Ret. General Walker was employed by Science Applications International Corporation. Later he did consulting work in the United Arab Emirates. He was President of the Huntsville Chapter of the Military Officers Association of America and Chairman of the Military Retiree Advisory Council to the Commander, Redstone Arsenal in Huntsville. General Walker was a volunteer with the Huntsville Chapter of the American Red Cross.

In 1998, Walker and his wife moved to Niceville, Florida. Upon his death in 2005 he was interred at Arlington National Cemetery.

== Decorations and medals ==
In 1990, General Walker was inducted into the U.S. Army Military Intelligence Hall of Fame at Fort Huachuca, Arizona and served as the Honorary Colonel of The Army's Military Intelligence Corps from 1994 until 1998. General Walker was a lifetime member of the Military Officers Association of America, the Veterans of Foreign Wars, the National Association of Uniformed Services, and the Association of the United States Army. He was also a member of the American Legion and the Knights of Columbus.

Among General Walker's awards and decorations were the Army Distinguished Service Medal, Legion of Merit, Air Medal, Meritorious Service Medal with 2 oak leaf clusters, Army Commendation Medal with 1 oak leaf cluster, Air Force Commendation Medal, National Defense Service Medal; Vietnam Service Medal; Armed Forces Reserve Medal; Army Service Ribbon; 4 awards of the Army Overseas Service Ribbon; Republic of Vietnam Campaign Medal with 4 campaign stars; Republic of Vietnam Gallantry Cross Unit Citation with Palm; and the Vietnamese Cross of Gallantry with Gold Cross.
