= Harold Robert Aaron =

United States Army general (1921–1980)

- Born: June 21, 1921; Kokomo, Indiana, U.S.
- Died: April 30, 1980 (aged 58); Fort Belvoir, Virginia, U.S.
- Burial place: Arlington National Cemetery
- Military career
- Branch: United States Army
- Service years: 1943–1979
- Rank: Lieutenant General
- Conflicts: World War II; Cold War; Vietnam War
- Awards: Distinguished Service Medal; Legion of Merit (3); Bronze Star (3); Purple Heart; Air Medal (2)
- Other work: Senior Staff Scientist, TRW

Harold Robert Aaron (June 21, 1921 – April 30, 1980) was a lieutenant general in the United States Army.

== Biography ==
Born in Kokomo, Indiana, Aaron attended Morton High School in Richmond, Indiana, graduating in 1938. He then studied at Earlham College for two years before entering the United States Military Academy at West Point in 1940. Aaron graduated with a B.S. degree in June 1943 and served in Europe during World War II, earning two Bronze Stars and a Purple Heart. He later graduated from the Command and General Staff College in 1953, the Armed Forces Staff College in 1958 and the National War College in 1964. Aaron completed an M.A. degree in international relations at Georgetown University in January 1960. He went on to earn a Ph.D. in international relations at Georgetown in 1964. His doctoral thesis was entitled The seizure of political power in Cuba, 1956-1959.

As a colonel, Aaron served as Commander, 5th Special Forces Group (Airborne) in Vietnam from June 4, 1968, to May 29, 1969, earning a third Bronze Star and two Air Medals. From November 5, 1973, to August 28, 1977, he served as the Assistant Chief of Staff for Intelligence, Headquarters, Department of the Army as a major general. Aaron was later promoted to lieutenant general. He retired from active duty on January 31, 1979, after serving as deputy director of the Defense Intelligence Agency.

Aaron married Marianne H. O'Donoghue on January 16, 1944, at St. Patrick's Cathedral in New York City. They had three sons and four daughters. After his retirement from the Army, Aaron and his wife lived in Annandale, Virginia.

Aaron died in DeWitt Army Hospital at Fort Belvoir after suffering a heart attack. He was buried at Arlington National Cemetery in Arlington, Virginia.

== Honors, awards and badges ==
In 1987 LTG Aaron was inducted into the Military Intelligence Hall of Fame at the United States Army Intelligence Center, Fort Huachuca, AZ.

- Defense Distinguished Service Medal
- Army Distinguished Service Medal with bronze Oak Leaf Cluster
- Legion of Merit with two Oak leaf clusters
- Bronze Star with "V" device and two Oak leaf clusters
- Purple Heart
- Air Medal with numeral two
- Army Commendation Medal
- American Campaign Medal
- European–African–Middle Eastern Campaign Medal with three campaign stars
- World War II Victory Medal
- Army of Occupation Medal with "Germany" clasp
- National Defense Service Medal with campaign star
- Vietnam Service Medal with three campaign stars
- Republic of Vietnam Campaign Medal with 1960 clasp
- Gallantry Cross (South Vietnam) Individual Citation

US Army Airborne basic parachutist badge

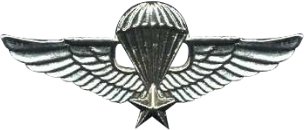
Republic of Vietnam (RVN) basic parachutist badge

- Army Presidential Unit Citation
- Army Meritorious Unit Commendation
- Vietnam Gallantry Cross with palm device unit citation
- Republic of Vietnam Civil Actions Medal Unit Citation

Office of the Secretary of Defense identification badage

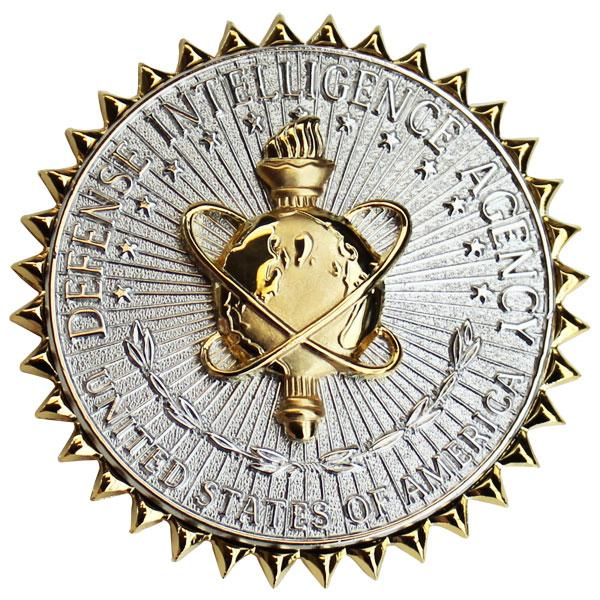
Defense Intelligence Agency identification badage

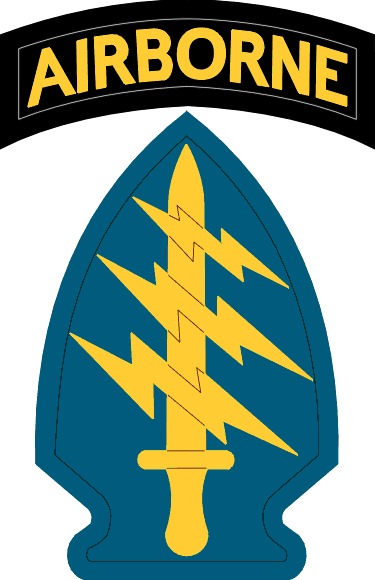
1st United States Army Special Forces SSI
