= Paul E. Menoher =

United States Army officer (1939–2020)

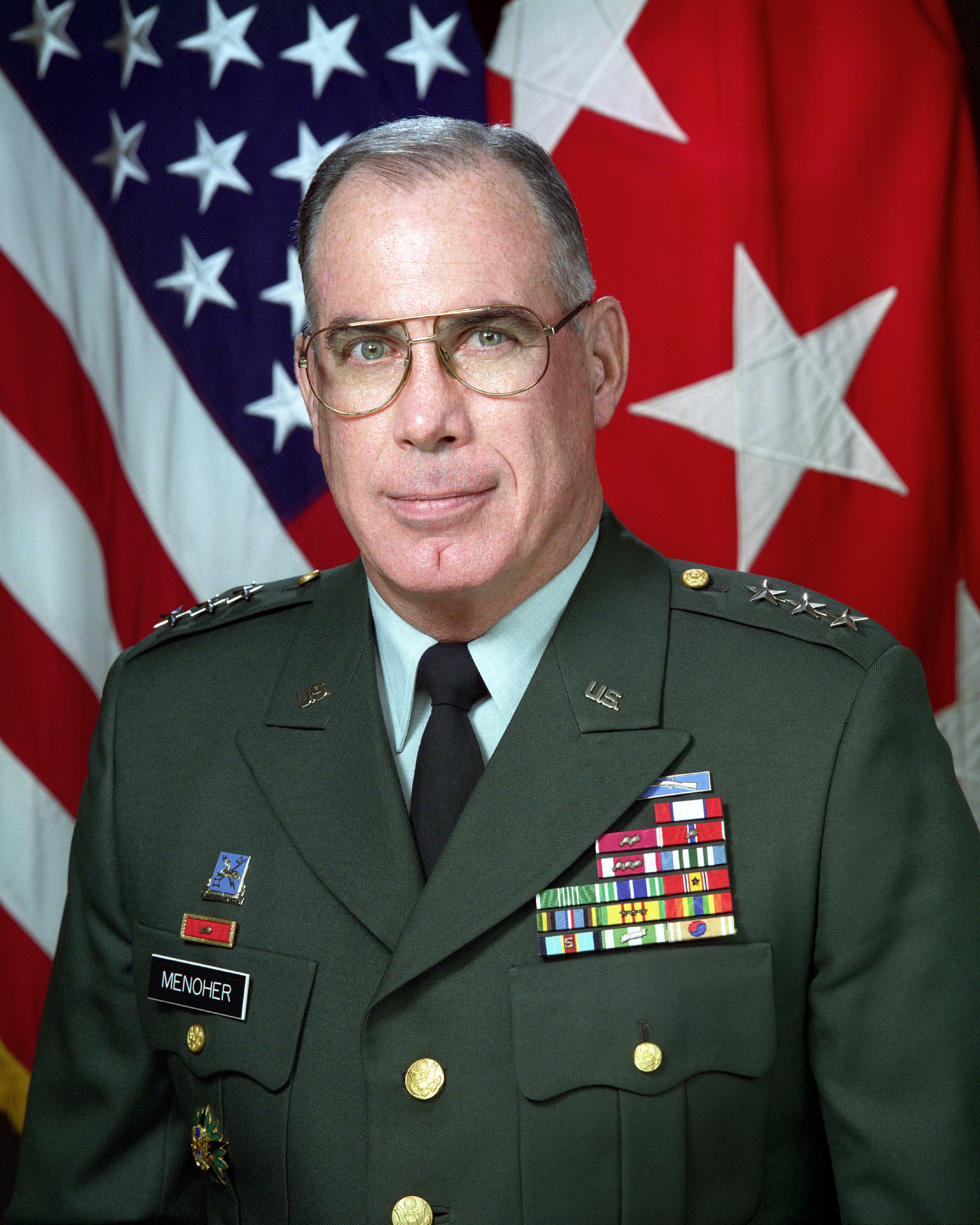
- Lieutenant General Paul E. Menoher Jr.
- Born: 20 July 1939; Florida, U.S.
- Died: 7 September 2020 (aged 81) Fredericksburg, Virginia
- Branch: United States Army
- Service years: 1961–1997
- Rank: Lieutenant General

Paul Edwin Menoher Jr. (20 July 1939 – 7 September 2020) was a U.S. Army officer.

Menoher earned a Bachelor of Arts degree in political science from the University of California, Berkeley in 1961 and later received a master's degree in international relations from George Washington University.

From 15 September 1989 to 27 July 1993, Menoher, served as Chief of the Military Intelligence Corps, commanding AIA and later the U.S. Army Intelligence Center in Fort Huachuca, AZ.

On 12 August 1993, as a major general, Menoher became the Commanding General, U.S. Army Intelligence and Security Command.

From February 1995 to February 1997, Lieutenant General Menoher served as Deputy Chief of Staff for Intelligence (DCSINT), Headquarters, Department of the Army.

Menoher was a member of the Military Intelligence Hall of Fame.

Menoher died on 7 September 2020 after a brief illness. He was interred at Arlington National Cemetery on 26 March 2021.

== Awards and decorations ==
Menoher's awards include:

- Military Intelligence Hall of Fame

Menoher's military decorations include:

- Distinguished Service Medal (2)
- Legion of Merit (3)
- Bronze Star (2)
- Meritorious Service Medal (4)
- Army Commendation Medal

== College Sports ==
Menoher played college baseball as a pitcher for the California Golden Bears of the University of California, Berkeley.
