= Mercedes O. Cubria =

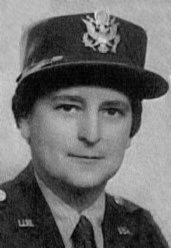
- Lt. Col. Mercedes O. Cubria; The first Cuban-born female officer in the U.S. Army
- Born: April 15, 1903; Guantanamo, Cuba
- Died: October 14, 1980 (aged 77); Miami, Florida
- Military career
- Allegiance: United States of America
- Branch: United States Army
- Service years: 1943-1973
- Rank: Lieutenant Colonel
- Nickname: "Tia"
- Conflicts: World War II; Korean War; Cold War
- Awards: Legion of Merit (2); Bronze Star Medal

Lieutenant Colonel Mercedes Olympia Cubria (April 15, 1903 - October 14, 1980), a.k.a. "La Tia" (The Aunt), was the first Cuban-born female officer in the U.S. Army. She served in the Women's Army Corps during World War II, in the U.S. Army during the Korean War, and was recalled into service during the Cuban Missile Crisis. In 1988, she was posthumously inducted into the Military Intelligence Hall of Fame.

== Early years ==
Cubria was born in Guantanamo, Cuba on April 15, 1903. When Cubria was 3 years old she lost her mother, she also had 2 sisters along with her. When she was 13 years old, her and her family moved to the United States. In 1924 she became a certified nurse and became a naturalized citizen. She worked as a nurse, an interpreter, and a rancher in the years leading up to World War II.

== Military service ==
On July 3, 1943, the WAC bill established the Women’s Army Corps as an integral part of United States Military. The bill was signed into law (Public Law 78-110), and became effective on September 1, 1943. Cubria enlisted in the Women's Army Corps after the U.S. entered World War II and, after her basic military training, she was sent to England for further training in cryptography. Cubria was commissioned with the rank of lieutenant, making her the first Cuban-born female officer in the United States Military. She was assigned to the 385th Signal Company. She was later reassigned to the 322nd Signal Company, where she worked on secret codes, and on gathering information on the Axis powers.

When the WAC bill established the Women’s Army Corps in 1943, Cubria and her female comrades-in-arms became members of the regular Army.

After World War II ended, Cubria was promoted to the rank of captain. She was assigned to the U.S. Army's Caribbean Theater, based at Quarry Heights in the Panama Canal Zone; she was the first woman to serve in active duty in that theater.

When the United States entered the Korean War, Cubria was promoted to major and deployed to Japan, where she continued to work in military intelligence. When the Korean War ended in 1953 Cubria was given a medical discharge, and was awarded the Bronze Star Medal for "meritorious achievement in ground operations against the enemy".

In 1962, Cubria was recalled to service by the U.S. Army as a result of the Cuban Missile Crisis. She worked primarily in the role of de-briefing Cuban refugees, as well as defectors who were fleeing the Cuban communist regime. She also helped the refugees find jobs and places to live. Cubria's work with the refugees proved to be a significant asset to the United States Army and the Central Intelligence Agency. Cubria was awarded the Legion of Merit and continued to serve for the next eleven years.

== Legacy ==
Cubria was promoted to lieutenant colonel and in 1973, at the age of 70, retired once more from the military. She was awarded a second Legion of Merit upon her retirement. Mercedes Cubria died on October 14, 1980, in her home in Miami, Florida.

In 1988, Cubria was posthumously inducted into the Military Intelligence Hall of Fame. The Military Intelligence Hall of Fame is a Hall of Fame established by the Military Intelligence Corps of the United States Army in 1988, to honor soldiers and civilians who have made exceptional contributions to Military Intelligence. The Hall is administered by the United States Army Intelligence Center at Fort Huachuca, Arizona.

== Awards and decorations ==
Among Lt. Col. Cubria's military decorations were the following:

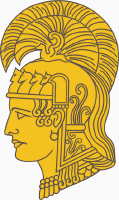

1st row	Legion of Merit w/ one oak leaf cluster		
2nd row	Bronze Star Medal	Army Good Conduct Medal	Women's Army Corps Service Medal
3rd row	American Campaign Medal	European-African-Middle Eastern Campaign Medal w/ 2 bronze service stars	World War II Victory Medal
4th row	National Defense Service Medal w/ 1 service star	Korean Service Medal	United Nations Service Medal
Insignia	Women's Army Corps Shoulder Sleeve Insignia		

== See also ==
- Hispanic Americans in World War II
