= Margaret, Alabama =

City in Alabama, United States

- City
- Location of Margaret in St. Clair County, Alabama.
- Coordinates: 33°39′24″N 86°29′10″W
- Country: United States
- State: Alabama
- County: St. Clair

Area
  - Total: 9.84 sq mi (25.48 km^{2})
  - Land: 9.82 sq mi (25.44 km^{2})
  - Water: 0.015 sq mi (0.04 km^{2})
- Elevation: 748 ft (228 m)

Population (2020)
  - Total: 5,106
  - Density: 519.9/sq mi (200.72/km^{2})
- Time zone: UTC-6 (Central (CST))
  - Summer (DST): UTC-5 (CDT)
- ZIP code: 35120
- Area codes: 205, 659
- FIPS code: 01-46696
- GNIS feature ID: 2406094
- Website: margaretal.gov

Margaret is a city in St. Clair County, Alabama, United States. At the 2020 census, the population was 5,106. As of the 2010 census, the population was 4,428, an increase of 278.8%. Margaret incorporated in 1960 and became a city in October 2011.

== History ==
The city was established in 1908 as a company town for the Alabama Fuel and Iron Company.

== Geography ==
According to the U.S. Census Bureau, the city has a total area of 9.3 square miles (24 km^{2}), of which 9.3 square miles (24 km^{2}) is land and 0.04 square miles (0.10 km^{2}) (0.21%) is water.

== Demographics ==
Historical population
Census	Pop.	Note	%±
1950	1,144		—
1960	715		−37.5%
1970	685		−4.2%
1980	757		10.5%
1990	616		−18.6%
2000	1,169		89.8%
2010	4,428		278.8%
2020	5,106		15.3%
2025 (est.)	7,149	▲	40.0%
U.S. Decennial Census; 2013 Estimate

=== 2000 census ===
At the 2000 census there were 1,169 people in 401 households, including 326 families, in the city. The population density was 125.8 inhabitants per square mile (48.6/km^{2}). There were 457 housing units at an average density of 49.2 per square mile (19.0/km^{2}). The racial makeup of the town was 65.18% White, 32.59% Black or African American, 0.34% Asian, 0.09% from other races, and 1.80% from two or more races. Of the 401 households 41.9% had children under the age of 18 living with them, 60.8% were married couples living together, 16.5% had a female householder with no husband present, and 18.7% were non-families. 16.7% of households were one person and 4.5% were one person aged 65 or older. The average household size was 2.92 and the average family size was 3.26.

The age distribution was 31.7% under the age of 18, 8.3% from 18 to 24, 30.9% from 25 to 44, 22.3% from 45 to 64, and 6.8% 65 or older. The median age was 31 years. For every 100 females, there were 92.6 males. For every 100 females age 18 and over, there were 90.0 males.

The median household income was $30,147 and the median family income was $32,019. Males had a median income of $28,798 versus $16,855 for females. The per capita income for the town was $13,764. About 14.0% of families and 15.9% of the population were below the poverty line, including 16.9% of those under age 18 and 13.1% of those age 65 or over.

=== 2010 census ===
At the 2010 census there were 4,428 people in 1,543 households, including 1,252 families, in the city. The population density was 476.1 inhabitants per square mile (183.8/km^{2}). There were 1,698 housing units at an average density of 182.6 per square mile (70.5/km^{2}). The racial makeup of the town was 77.3% White, 19.3% Black or African American, 0.8% Asian, 0.8% from other races, and 1.5% from two or more races. Of the 1,543 households 44.3% had children under the age of 18 living with them, 66.8% were married couples living together, 9.7% had a female householder with no husband present, and 18.9% were non-families. 15.6% of households were one person and 2.3% were one person aged 65 or older. The average household size was 2.87 and the average family size was 3.19.

The age distribution was 29.9% under the age of 18, 6.7% from 18 to 24, 38.5% from 25 to 44, 19.9% from 45 to 64, and 5.0% 65 or older. The median age was 31 years. For every 100 females, there were 99.8 males. For every 100 females age 18 and over, there were 98.3 males.

The median household income was $52,111 and the median family income was $52,463. Males had a median income of $41,941 versus $34,242 for females. The per capita income for the town was $19,984. About 3.3% of families and 6.2% of the population were below the poverty line, including 1.6% of those under age 18 and 14.0% of those age 65 or over.

=== 2020 census ===
Margaret racial composition
Race	Num.	Perc.
White (non-Hispanic)	3,645	71.39%
Black or African American (non-Hispanic)	1,021	20.0%
Native American	8	0.16%
Asian	37	0.72%
Pacific Islander	1	0.02%
Other/Mixed	259	5.07%
Hispanic or Latino	135	2.64%

As of the 2020 United States census, there were 5,106 people, 1,256 households, and 1,088 families residing in the city.

== Notable people ==
- Oliver W. Dillard, US Army Retired, became the Army's fifth Black general officer in 1972.
- Sammy Price, former running back for the Miami Dolphins
