= Attorney General Thomas =

Attorney General Thomas may refer to:

- David Thomas (Texas politician) (1795–1836), Attorney General of the Republic of Texas
- James Houston Thomas (1808–1876), Attorney General of Tennessee
- James Kay Thomas (1902–1989), Attorney General of West Virginia
- Jesse B. Thomas Jr. (1806–1850), Attorney General of Illinois
- Michael David Thomas (born 1933), Attorney General of Hong Kong
- Tommy Thomas (barrister) (born 1952), Attorney General of Malaysia

== See also ==
- General Thomas (disambiguation)
