= Boniface Campbell =

United States Army general

- Born: 27 September 1895; Kitsap County, Washington, U.S.
- Died: 25 March 1988 (aged 92)
- Education: Bowdoin College; United States Army Command and General Staff College; United States Army War College
- Military career
- Allegiance: United States
- Branch: U.S. Army
- Service years: 1918–1956
- Rank: Major General
- Commands: Commanding Officer Artillery, 98th Infantry Division; Commanding General Artillery, IX Corps
- Conflicts: World War I World War II
- Awards: Legions of Merit(2); National Defense Service Medal; WWI Victory Medal

Boniface Campbell (September 27, 1895 – March 25, 1988) was a United States Army Major General.

He was commander of V Corps in 1951. In 1953 he was commandant of Fort Holabird, in the Army Counterintelligence Corps.

In April 1957, he was awarded a Bronze Oak Leaf Cluster in lieu of a Second Award of the Legion of Merit for "exceptionally meritorious conduct in the performance of outstanding services to the Government of the United States from November 1945 to December 1956".

He was the eldest son of the film director Colin Campbell.

== Awards ==
Campbells' medals and decorations included:

Legion of Merit w/ bronze oak leaf cluster		National Defense Service Medal
World War I Victory Medal	American Defense Service Medal	American Campaign Medal
World War II Victory Medal	Asiatic-Pacific Campaign Medal w/ two bronze oak leaf clusters	Army of Occupation Medal w/ German clasp
Philippine Independence Medal	Philippine Liberation Medal w/ two bronze oak leaf clusters	Order of Military Merit Ulchi (Korea) w/ gold star
