= Garrison B. Coverdale =

United States Army general (1905–1988)

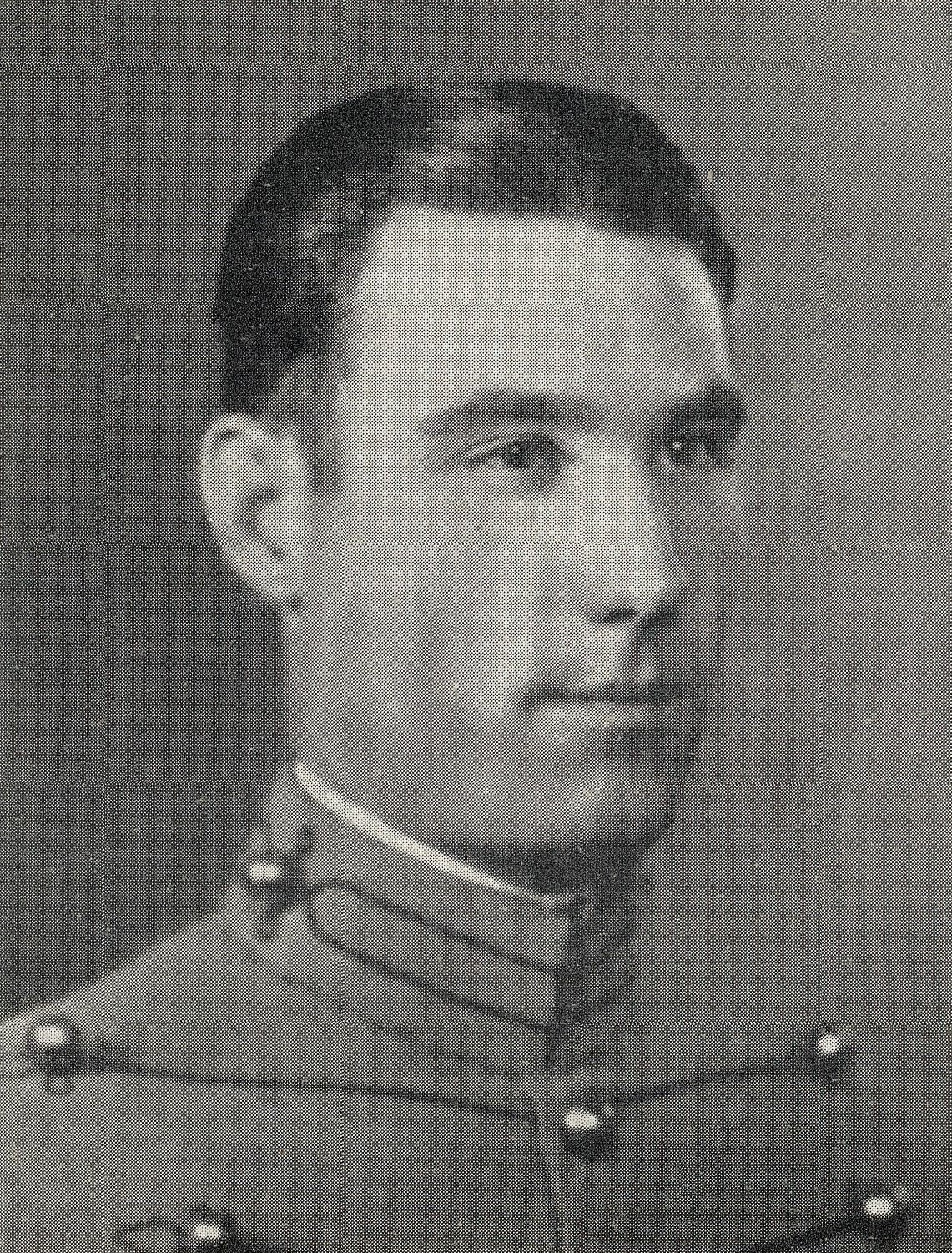
- At West Point in 1928
- Born: July 12, 1905; Phoenix, Arizona
- Died: June 8, 1988 (aged 82); Columbus, Georgia
- Burial place: Arlington National Cemetery
- Education: United States Military Academy; Army Command and General Staff School; Army Command and General Staff College; National War College
- Military career
- Allegiance: United States
- Branch: United States Army
- Service years: 1928–1963
- Rank: Major general
- Commands: 5003rd Field Artillery Group
- Conflicts: World War II

Garrison Barkley Coverdale (July 12, 1905, Phoenix, Arizona – June 8, 1988, Columbus, Georgia) was a United States Army Officer. General Coverdale is a member of the Military Intelligence Hall of Fame.

Coverdale earned a B.S. degree from the United States Military Academy in June 1928 and was commissioned as a second lieutenant of field artillery. He later graduated from the Army Command and General Staff School in September 1942, the Army Command and General Staff College in July 1947 and the National War College in 1951.

Before World War II, Coverdale served as an ROTC instructor at Cornell University from October 1939 to September 1940. He received a temporary promotion to major in January 1941 and then served as a field artillery training battalion commander at Fort Sill, Oklahoma from August 1941 to July 1942. Coverdale received a second temporary promotion to lieutenant colonel in February 1942.

During World War II, Coverdale served in China in Army Intelligence. He also commanded the 5003rd Field Artillery Group. Coverdale was captured by the Japanese in 1944, but escaped after three days and was able to return to Allied territory with the aid of Chinese partisans.

Coverdale was promoted to the rank of brigadier general on June 13, 1953. He served as commander of the IX Corps Artillery in Korea for four months in 1954. Brigadier General Coverdale served as commander of the Tokyo-Yokohama District of the IX Corps from 1954 to 1956 at Hardy Barracks, Tokyo. In 1956, he became deputy commanding general of the 1st Cavalry Division in Tokyo at Hardy Barracks with responsibility for the Tokyo-Yokohama District.

General Coverdale returned to the United States in 1957 and shortly thereafter was promoted to major general. He served as assistant director and chief of staff of the National Security Agency until 1959. From August 3, 1961, to June 30, 1963, Coverdale was commandant of the Army Intelligence School at Fort Holabird, Maryland, and chief, Intelligence Corps. He remained on active duty until July 31, 1963.

After his death at Fort Benning, Georgia, Coverdale was buried in Section 30 of Arlington National Cemetery on June 14, 1988. His wife Katharine Briggs Coverdale (1908–1990) was interred beside him two years later. Their son Craig Garrison Coverdale (1931–1985) is also buried in Section 30. He was a U.S. Army colonel who graduated from West Point in 1953 and served in Vietnam.
