= Military Intelligence Hall of Fame =

US military hall of fame

Coordinates: 31°33′35″N 110°20′40″W

The Military Intelligence Hall of Fame is a hall of fame established by the Military Intelligence Corps of the United States Army in 1988 to honor soldiers and civilians who have made exceptional contributions to military intelligence. The hall is administered by the United States Army Intelligence Center at Fort Huachuca, Arizona.

== Notable honorees ==
- Aaron, LTG Harold R. (1987)
- Aiso, COL John F. (1991)
- Akune, SPC Harry M. (1996)
- Alchesay, SGT William (2012)
- Alexander, GEN Keith B. (2016)
- Allen, CW3 Doris "Lucki" (2009)
- Allen, 1LT Gardiner P. (1988)
- Allenbaugh, COL Richard E. (2002)
- Alvarado, MSG Lorenzo (1988)
- Atchison, LTC Ellis C. (2018)
- Bagot, COL Alfred W. (1988)
- Baker, COL Daniel F. (2010)
- Beatson, SP5 Gerald R. (1989)
- Bennett, Ms. Jean M. (2007)
- Bissell, SGT Daniel Jr. (1988)
- Bharucha-Reid, COL Kurush (KB) (2014)
- Black, COL John H. (1996)
- Blair, COL Joseph M. III (2012)
- Blascak, COL Donald W. (1990)
- Boker, MAJ John R. Jr. (1990)
- Bonilla, SSG Antonio (2015)
- Bounds, CW3 Brian K. (2016)
- Bowser, Ms. Mary Elizabeth (1995)
- Bray, MAJ Ann M. (1989)
- Bross, COL John A. (1990)
- Bunn, MSG Travis C. (1992)
- Burgess, LTG Ronald L. (2015)
- Butler, CSM John C. (2004)
- Campbell, CW5 Michael E. (2025)
- Campbell, LTG William H. (2008)
- Carr, COL John M. (1988)
- Carter, LTG Marshall S. (1988)
- Castleton, CW5 Lon D. (2007)
- Chambers, LTC James A. (2006)
- Charron, CSM Clifford L. (1989)
- Chunn, CSM Scott (2010)
- Churchill, BG Marlborough (1988)
- Clinton, Dr. Rankin A. (1988)
- Concannon, COL John F., III (1999)
- Corderman, MG W. Preston (1988)
- Coverdale, MG Garrison B. (1989)
- Cubria, LTC Mercedes O. (1988)
- Dalton, COL Elvin J. (1988)
- Davidson, LTG Phillip B. Jr. (1988)
- Davis, SIES-5 James D. (1997)
- Davis, LTG John J. (1988)
- De Pasqua, SGT Peter (1988)
- Dean, COL Byron K. (1999)
- DeFreitas, MG John III (2015)
- Denholm, MG Charles J. (1988)
- Dillard, COL Douglas C. (1990)
- Dillard, MG Oliver W. (2012)
- Dillon, SIES-5 Thomas (2006)
- Donohue, MW4 Robert P. (1994)
- Donovan, MG William J. (1988)
- Dunn, PFC Parker F. (2012)
- Eckman, COL George R. (1989)
- Edgell, CW4 Douglas C. (2003)
- Edmunds, Ms. Sarah Emma (1988)
- Eichelberger, LTG Charles B. (1992)
- Eifler, COL Carl F. (1988)
- Elliott, COL Alfred H., III (2003)
- Ellis, BG Richard T. (2010)
- Epp, BG Orlando C. (1988)
- Evers, COL Richard E. (1988)
- Fast, MG Barbara G. (2010)
- Faust, COL James T. (Tommy) (2015)
- Fergusson, COL Thomas Galloway (2014)
- Fitch, LTG Alva R. (1988)
- Flynn, MG Thomas J. (1988)
- Foulois, MG Benjamin D. (1988)
- Freeze, MG James E. (1987)
- Fried, CW5 Michael L. (2001)
- Friedman, Mr. William F. (1988)
- Ford, COL Terrance M. (2016)
- Fukuhara, COL Harry K. (1988)
- Gardner, COL William H. (1992)
- Gatewood, 1LT Charles B. (1988)
- Goddard, BG George W. (1987)
- Godding, MG George A. (1987)
- Goodman, CSM Charles “Mike” (2025)
- Gordon, BG Dudley (2026)
- Graham, LTG Daniel O. (1988)
- Greene, MG Harold J. (2015)
- Gregorcyk, CSM John F. Jr. (2008)
- Gribble, COL G. Dickson Jr. (2011)
- Griffin, Mrs. Glenda K. (2017)
- Griffith, Countess Aline (1989)
- Hall, CSM Robert T. (2004)
- Hall, Miss Virginia (1988)
- Halverson, MG Robert L. (2006)
- Hamada, SSG Dick S. (2015)
- Hamby, COL James A. (2026)
- Hans, Mr. Theodor (2000)
- Harmon, MG William E. (2009)
- Harding, MG Robert A. (2009)
- Haubrich, CSM Lawrence J. (2017)
- Hecht, Senator "Chic" Jacob (1988)
- Herrington, COL Stuart (2025)
- Hitchcock, LTC Ethan A. (1988)
- Hitt, COL Parker (1988)
- Hodge, SFC Benjamin T. (1997)
- Holland, COL Leland J. (1988)
- Hollingsworth, CSM Randolph S. (2001)
- Hovey, Mr. Herbert S. Jr. (1991)
- Howell, CSM George W. Jr. (1987)
- Huff, LTC Gordon R. (1989)
- Huffman, SGT Charles M. (2020)
- Hughes, Mr. John T. (1989)
- Hughes, LTG Patrick M. (2001)
- Ice, CSM Clovis D. (1988)
- Isler, MG Roderick J. (2007)
- Iwai, LTC Gero (1995)
- Jennings, MAJ William I. (1988)
- Jilli, Mr. Edmund C. (1988)
- Johnson, CSM James (Art) A. (2005)
- Johnston, COL Fredrick W., III (1994)
- Johnston, MG Gary Johnston (2025)
- Jones, COL Jerry W. (2008)
- Jones, COL Jon M. (2006)
- Kanegai, MAJ Yoshio G. (2007)
- Kapp, PFC Stanley W. (1988)
- Kelly, Mr. Merrill T. (1988)
- Kelly, COL Robert J. (1996)
- Kelsey, COL James H.P. (1996)
- Kennedy, LTG Claudia J. (2004)
- Kerrick, LTG Donald L. (2002)
- Kim, MAJ Peter (2026)
- Kimmons, LTG John F. (2017)
- King, LTG James C. (2006)
- Klecka, Mrs. Lillian (1988)
- Klehn, CSM David P. (1994)
- Knowlton, LTC Thomas (1996)
- Koch, BG Oscar W. (1993)
- Koeber, Mr. Kenneth T. (1994)
- Komori, CWO Arthur S. (1988)
- Kullback, COL Solomon T. (1988)
- Lackey III, COL John G. (Tony) (2012)
- Lansdale, COL John Jr. (2010)
- Leide, MG John (Jack) A. (2005)
- Leigh, Mr. Robert A. (1991)
- Lindley, CW4 Alan L. (2008)
- Lowe, Mr. Thaddeus S.C. (1988)
- Lowry, CSM Raymon V. (2001)
- Lundgren, COL Duwayne C. (1991)
- Luongo, Mr. Joseph P. (1994)
- Lutjens, COL Paul R. (1988)
- Mack, CWO Theodore H. (1988)
- Marks, BG James A. (Spider) (2012)
- Maroney, CW5 Michael J. (2002)
- Mashbir, COL Sidney F. (1988)
- Masuda, Mr. Hisashi J. (1988)
- Matlack, Mrs. Dorothe K. (1987)
- Matsumoto, MSG Roy H. (1997)
- Mauborgne, MG Joseph O. (1988)
- McChristian, MG Joseph A. (1988)
- McCord, COL Thomas F. (2005)
- McCormick, CSM Sterling T. (2000)
- McDonough, CW3 Ann M. (1988)
- McFadden, COL John J. (1988)
- McFarland, COL Maxie L. (2014)
- McKee, MAJ Charles D. (2000)
- McKnight, COL David A. (2003)
- McKnight, CSM Raymond (1998)
- Menoher, LTG Paul E. Jr. (1998)
- Mertz, 1SG Robert G. Jr. (2002)
- Minnock, SP5 Edward W. (1990)
- Moore, Bill "Rod" (2017)
- Moore, 1LT Edward R. (1988)
- Muller, BG Henry J. Jr. (2017)
- Myles, CW5 Alfred J. (2011)
- Nicholson, LTC Arthur D. Jr. (1991)
- Nolan, MG Dennis E. (1988)
- Noonan, LTG Robert W. Jr. (2004)
- Nottingham, COL Seth F. Jr. (1998)
- O'Connell, COL Thomas W. (2008)
- O'Connor, CSM John P. (2003)
- Odom, LTG William E. (1989)
- Oliver, CW5 Robert P. (1995)
- O' Meara CW5 Paul L. (2018)
- Owens, LTG Ira C. (2002)
- Parker, COL Joe R. (2017)
- Parker, MG Julius Jr. (1990)
- Parkinson, Mr. William L. (1999)
- Pash, COL Boris T. (1988)
- Pattison, COL John A. (1991)
- Peets, CW4 Ben E. (2003)
- Petito, COL Peter A. (1988)
- Pfister, MG Cloyd H. (1994)
- Pineda, CW5 John A. (2015)
- Pinkerton, Mr. Allan (1988)
- Potts, LTG William E. (1987)
- Powe, COL Marc B. (2021)
- Prewitt, CW5 James "Jerry" (2017)
- Price, CW5 Wallace S. (2009)
- Ragatz, CW4 William T. (1990)
- Rasmussen, COL Kai E. (1988)
- Rea, LTC Billy C. (1992)
- Reagan, CW3 Sherman C. (2000)
- Renken, CW4 Dennis E. (2005)
- Reuss, COL Robert (2018)
- Richard, CWO Joseph E. (1993)
- Roberts, CSM Michael W. (2014)
- Robinson, MAJ Kenneth L. (2004)
- Rolya, LTG William I. (1987)
- Rosenow, Mr. Kurt (1988)
- Ross, COL Franz (1988)
- Roth, COL Robert C. (1988)
- Rothenstein, CSM Louis H. (1990)
- Rowan, COL Andrew S. (1988)
- Rowe, COL James N. (1989)
- Rowlett, COL Frank B. (1988)
- Rybak, Mr. Edward (1992)
- Rydell, CSM Dennis M. (2018)
- Sakakida, LTC Richard M. (1988)
- Sarac, CW5 Ivan (2007)
- Saunders, CSM Franklin A. (2013)
- Scanlon, MG Charles F. (1995)
- Schneider, COL Lawrence (2007)
- Sharpe, BG George H. (2013)
- Shaw, COL Harold R. (1988)
- Sheldon, COL Douglas M. (2015)
- Sherr, COL Joe R. (1988)
- Shoemaker, Mr. Paul R. (1991)
- Simerly, COL Charles S. (1994)
- Sinkov, COL Abraham (1987)
- Sisler, 1LT George K. (1988)
- Slavin, COL James V. (2012)
- Smith, CSM Debra E. (2004)
- Soyster, LTG Harry E. (1995)
- Spracher, Dr. William (2025)
- Stein, CPL Irving A. (1988)
- Stewart, MG John F. Jr. (1997)
- Strom, BG Roy “Bud” M. (2009)
- Stuart, COL Archibald W. (1988)
- Stubblebine, MG Albert N., III (1990)
- Swarens, CW5 Richard L (2012)
- Tagami, MAJ Kan (1996)
- Tait, COL William "Jerry" (2013)
- Tallmadge, MAJ Benjamin (1988)
- Taylor, CPT Daniel M. (1988)
- Taylor, Mr. Herbert W. (1993)
- Taylor, LTC Robert V. (1999)
- Thomas, MG Charles W. (2001)
- Thomas, MG John D. Jr. (2003)
- Thompson, MG Edmund R. (1987)
- Torpey, COL William T. (2011)
- Trudeau, LTG Arthur G. (1988)
- Tubman, Harriet (2021)
- Unrath, MAJ Walter J. (2002)
- Van Deman, MG Ralph H. (1988)
- Van Lew, Ms. Elizabeth (1993)
- Vernau, COL William F. (1988)
- Versace, CPT Humbert R. (2003)
- Vieler, COL Eric H. (1988)
- Vorhies, COL Harold W. (1999)
- Walker, BG George J. (1990)
- Walsh, COL Walter V. Jr. (2008)
- Walters, LTG Vernon A. (1987)
- Walters, COL William P. (1993)
- Warnock, Mr. Michael T. (2018)
- Watlington, Mr. Junius A. (1992)
- Weinstein, LTG Sidney T. (1990)
- Wells, COL Norman S. (1987)
- Wetherill, COL Jerry G. (1990)
- Williams, LTG James A. (1987)
- Williams, CSM Odell (2009)
- Williams, CW5 Rex A. (2005)
- Willoughby, MG Charles A. (1988)
- Wilson, MSG John R. (1990)
- Wilson, LTG Samuel V. (1987)
- Winchester, Mr. Robert J. (2013)
- Wise, CSM Sammy (2026)
- Wright, CSM Ronald D. (2009)
- Wykoff, CSM Jerry F. (2016)
- Yarborough, LTG William P. (1988)
- Yardley, MAJ Herbert O. (1988)
- Young, COL Charles D. (1999)
- Zahner, LTG Richard P. (2016)

== Honorary inductees ==
- Captain Sir William Stephenson, CC, MC, DFC, Canadian Forces

== See also ==
- CIA Memorial Wall – Memorial to CIA employees
- NSA Hall of Honor – Memorial at the National Security Agency headquarters
- Awards and decorations of the United States government#United States Intelligence Community
