= Fort Holabird =

US Army post in Baltimore, Maryland

Coordinates: 39.2689°N 76.5357°W

Fort Holabird was a United States Army post in the city of Baltimore, Maryland, active from 1918 to 1973.

== History ==
Fort Holabird was located in the southeast corner of Baltimore and northwest of the suburban developments of Dundalk, Maryland, in surrounding Baltimore County, fronting on Holabird Avenue between Broening Highway and Dundalk Avenue. From 1941 until the end of World War II, the military installation grew to include approximately 350 acres and 286 buildings. After the Second World War, activities at Fort Holabird were curtailed and portions of the property were transferred from the Army. The largest land transfers occurred in the timeframe over three decades later following the Vietnam War, between 1977 and 1979, when 223 acres were transferred to the city of Baltimore. The city later developed the land in succeeding years into the Fort Holabird Industrial Park.

== Timeline ==
- 1918: Established as Camp Holabird on 96 acres of marsh near Colgate Creek. Established as the U.S. Army's first motor transport training center and depot in southeastern Baltimore. It was named for Army Quartermaster General and West Point graduate Samuel B. Holabird (1826-1907).
- 1918: During World War I, Holabird supplied the American Expeditionary Forces in France with Detroit-made vehicles. Thousands of military personnel were trained there to drive and repair automobiles and trucks.
- 1918 or after: Became home to the Holabird Quartermaster Depot.
- 2 July 1919: U.S. Navy blimp C-8 explodes while landing at Camp Holabird, injuring about 80 adults and children who were watching. Windows in homes a mile away are broken by the blast.
- 1920: by 1920 a center for the research and development of military vehicles was established at Holabird. Here the now-famous Jeep was tested and refined.
- 1940: Listed as Holabird Quartermaster Depot on the 1940 U.S. Census.
- 1942: Renamed as Holabird Ordnance Depot.
- 1943: Renamed as Holabird Signal Depot.
- 1947: Renamed as Camp Holabird.
- 1950: Renamed as Fort Holabird. The U.S. Army Intelligence School and Counter Intelligence Records Facility based here until transferred to Fort Huachuca, Arizona in 1972. It was also used as an Armed Forces Examining & Entrance Station (induction facility).
- Early 1970s: Due to its proximity to Washington, D.C., Ft. Holabird was used to guard witnesses in major federal cases, such as the Watergate hearings. E. Howard Hunt, Charles Colson and John Dean were among the Watergate witnesses held there.
- 1973: Closed, area has been redeveloped into an industrial park.
- 2001: Fire destroys remnants of former spy school.

== Notable people trained or stationed at Ft. Holabird ==
- Zine El Abidine Ben Ali, former President of Tunisia
- Donald L. Barlett, author and investigative journalist
- Stephen Barnett, law profession and legal scholar
- Stephen Breyer, associate justice of the Supreme Court of United States
- C. D. B. Bryan, author and journalist
- Boniface Campbell, U.S. Army major general
- Roger Christie, ordained minister in the Religion of Jesus Church
- Garrison B. Coverdale, U.S. Army major general
- Thomas J. Dodd Jr., U.S. Ambassador to Uruguay and Costa Rica
- Oliver W. Dillard, U.S. Army major general
- Mike Gravel, U.S. senator from Alaska, 1969-81
- W. E. B. Griffin, novelist
- Chic Hecht, U.S. senator from Nevada 1983-89
- Dennis F. Hightower, former Deputy Secretary, U.S. Department of Commerce
- Clint Hill, Secret Service agent
- Patrick M. Hughes, former director of the Defense Intelligence Agency
- Thomas Charles Huston, author of the Huston Plan
- Eli Jacobs, financier and attorney, owner of the Baltimore Orioles from 1989 to 1993
- Morton Kondracke, political commentator and journalist
- Ann M. McDonough, first woman member of the U.S. Army Counter Intelligence Corps
- George J. Mitchell, U.S. senator from Maine, 1980-95
- Ben Moses, filmmaker and documentarian
- Robert H. Pepper, U.S. Marines Corps lieutenant general
- McCandlish Phillips, journalist and author
- J. D. Salinger, author
- Douglas L. Turner, former Washington Bureau Chief of The Buffalo News
- Humbert Roque Versace, U.S. Army officer who received the Medal of Honor
- George J. Walker, U.S. Army brigadier general and former Deputy Commanding General of INSCOM

== Gallery ==
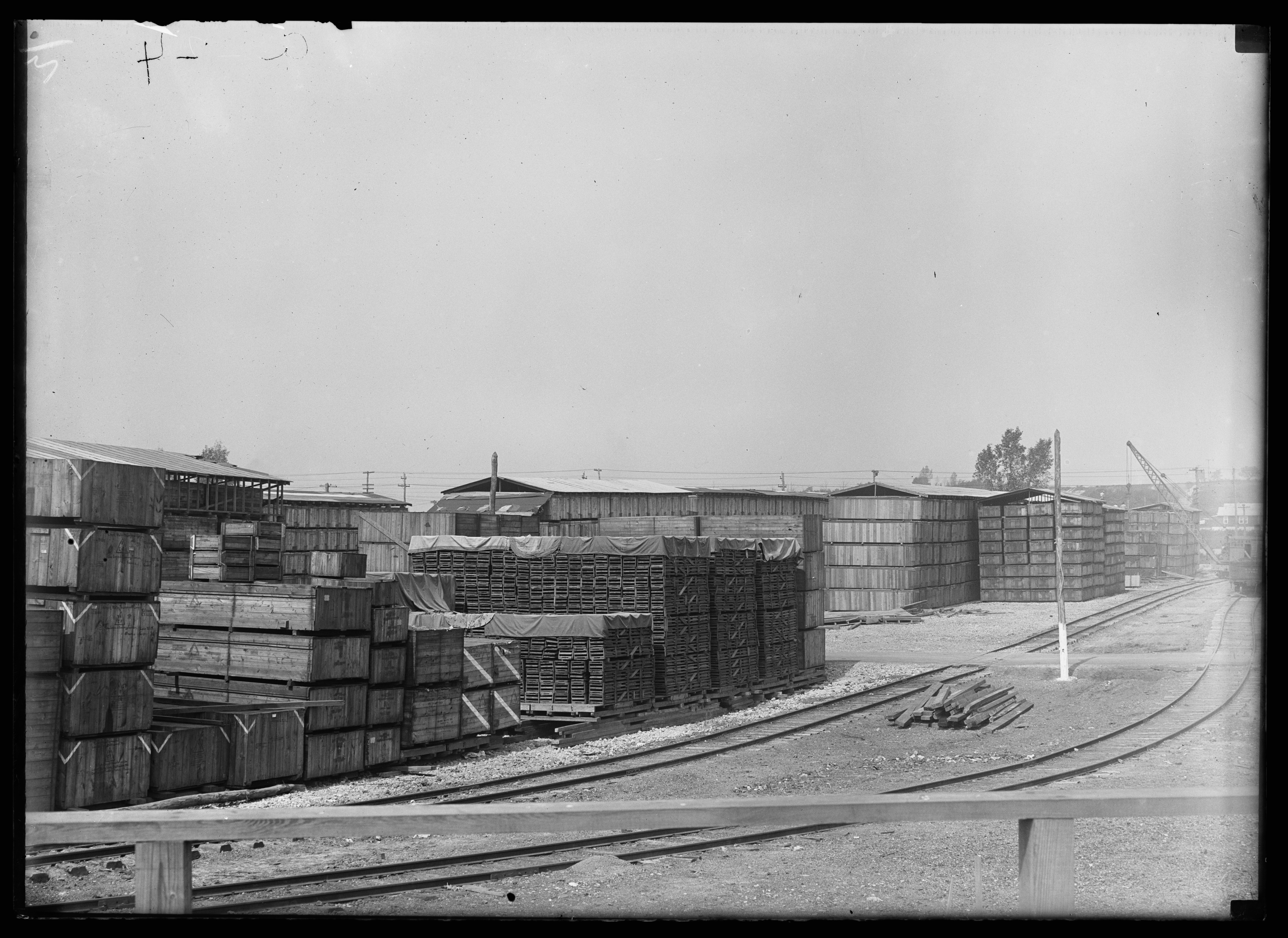
Camp Holabird, Baltimore, Maryland, sometime between 1918 and 1923.

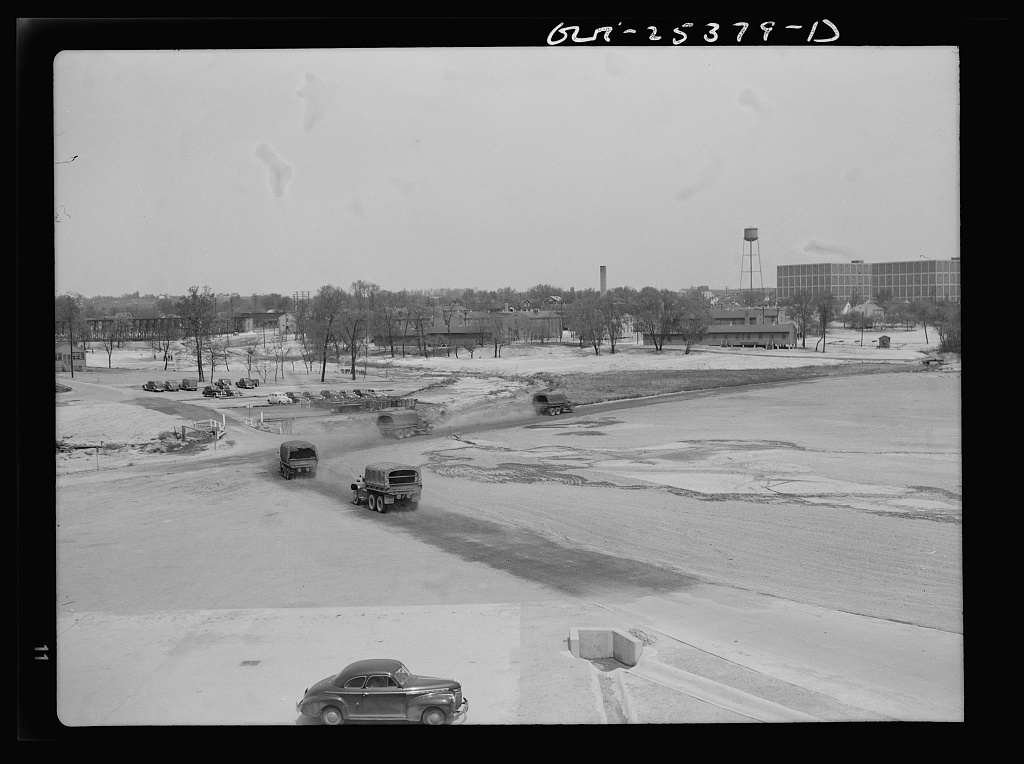
Holabird Ordnance Depot, Baltimore, Maryland, circa May 1943.

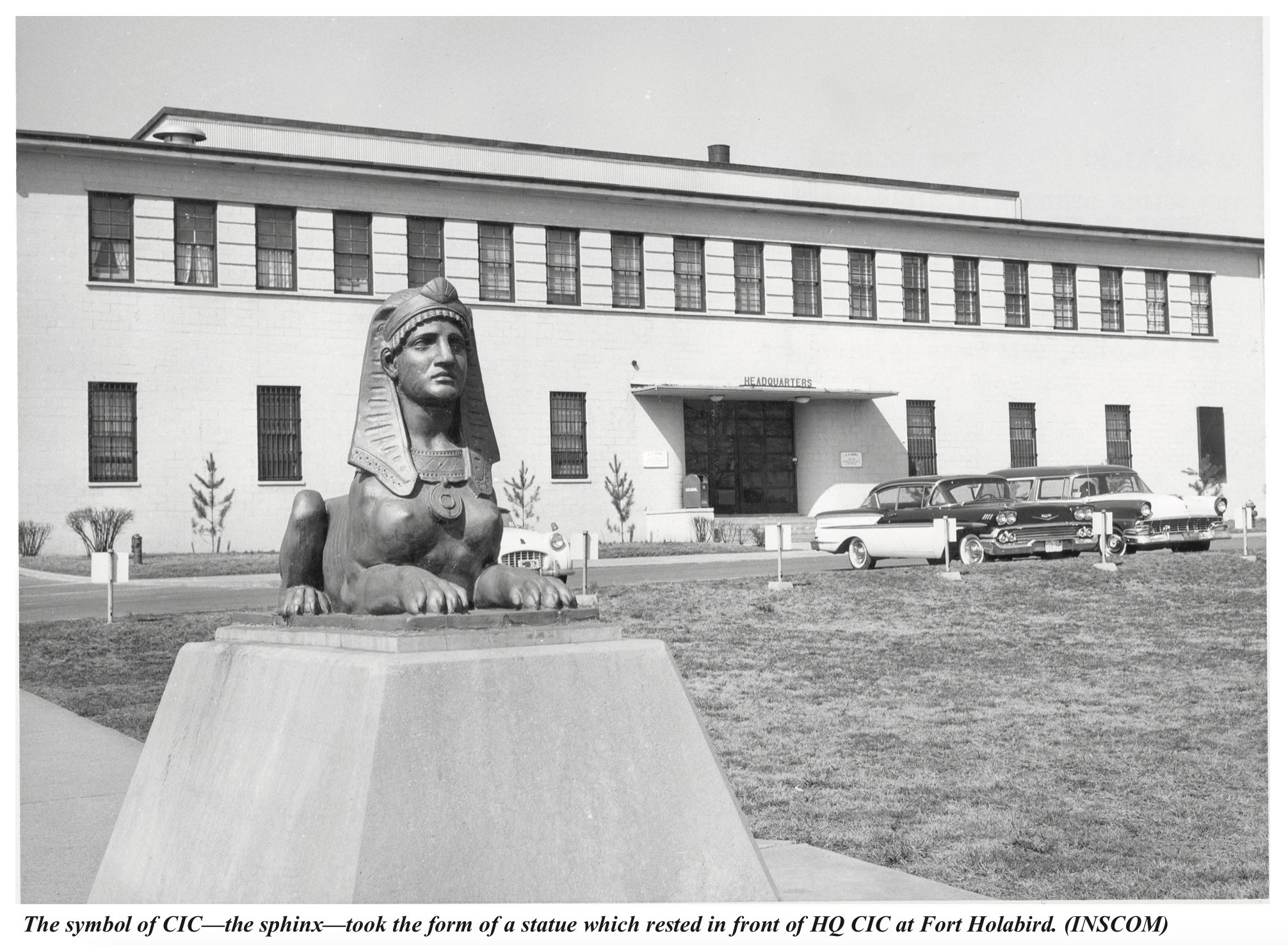
A sphinx guarded the entrance of HQ CIC at Fort Holabird in the 1950s.

== See also ==
- Counterintelligence Corps
- Fort Howard, Maryland, interrogation training
- P. O. Box 1142, WWII military intelligence facility
- Karl Probst, designer of the first jeep prototypes
- United States Army Counterintelligence
- United States Army Intelligence Center
