= Ann M. McDonough =

- Born: 1915
- Died: 1995 (aged 79–80)
- Branch: Women's Army Corps; United States Army
- Service years: 1949–1974
- Rank: Chief warrant officer three
- Conflicts: Vietnam War
- Awards: Bronze Star Medal; Army Commendation Medal; Army Good Conduct Medal; Army of Occupation Medal; National Defense Service Medal; Armed Forces Expeditionary Medal; Vietnam Service Medal; Vietnam Campaign Medal; Vietnam Cross of Gallantry; Meritorious Unit Commendation

Ann M. McDonough (1915–1995) was a United States Army Chief Warrant Officer 3 in Military Intelligence including counterintelligence roles. In 1988, she was admitted as a member of the Military Intelligence Hall of Fame where she served as a Distinguished Member of the Corps until her death in April 1995.

== Enlisted years ==
McNaughton began her career in the civil service in 1942. She resigned from the civil service in 1949 to join the Women's Army Corps (WAC). She obtained intelligence analyst training and became the first woman posted to the Counter Intelligence Corps (CIC) in 1952.

McNaughton was eventually transferred to internal affairs at Fort Holabird, Maryland's Intelligence Center, where she earned a spot in the Counter Intelligence Corps Basic Agents' Course as the first female student to be enlisted. She later graduated with honors from the course.

Between 1952 and 1955, McNaughton worked as a special agent for the 902nd Counter Intelligence Corps Group in Washington, DC. After graduating from the Army Language School for French in 1956, she made history as the first female special agent assigned to the 66th MI Group. She undertook various covert tasks in East and West Germany over the next five years, in addition to attending the German Language School as a Programmer.

== Warrant officer years ==
CW3 McNaughton was promoted to warrant officer upon her return to the United States in 1963. After her desire to attend the Polygraph School was approved, she opened up new opportunities for women in the counterintelligence sector. She was the first woman to enroll in this program. From 1966 to 1968, she added Vietnamese to her linguistics qualifications and worked in Vietnam with the Military Assistance Command, Vietnam. She was awarded a Bronze Star for her exemplary service as a polygrapher who worked all across the country. Her illustrious career was cut short in 1974 when she was forced to quit owing to a medical problem. She died in 1995.

== Legacy ==
Chief Warrant Officer Three Ann M. McNaughton Hall, the new headquarters and Army Counterintelligence Center complex for the 902nd Military Intelligence Group (United States), was dedicated on April 19, 2012. The group command team decided to name the new building after CW3 McNaughton in honor of her contributions to the Counter Intelligence Corps and her distinguished career after a process that included input from the entire group, the US Army Intelligence and Security Command historian, and the US Army Intelligence Center of Excellence historian.

== Awards ==
- Bronze Star Medal
- Army Commendation Medal
- Army Good Conduct Medal
- Army of Occupation Medal
- National Defense Service Medal
- Armed Forces Expeditionary Medal
- Vietnam Service Medal
- Vietnam Campaign Medal
- Vietnam Cross of Gallantry
- Meritorious Unit Commendation
