= Ira C. Owens =

United States Army general (1936–2026)

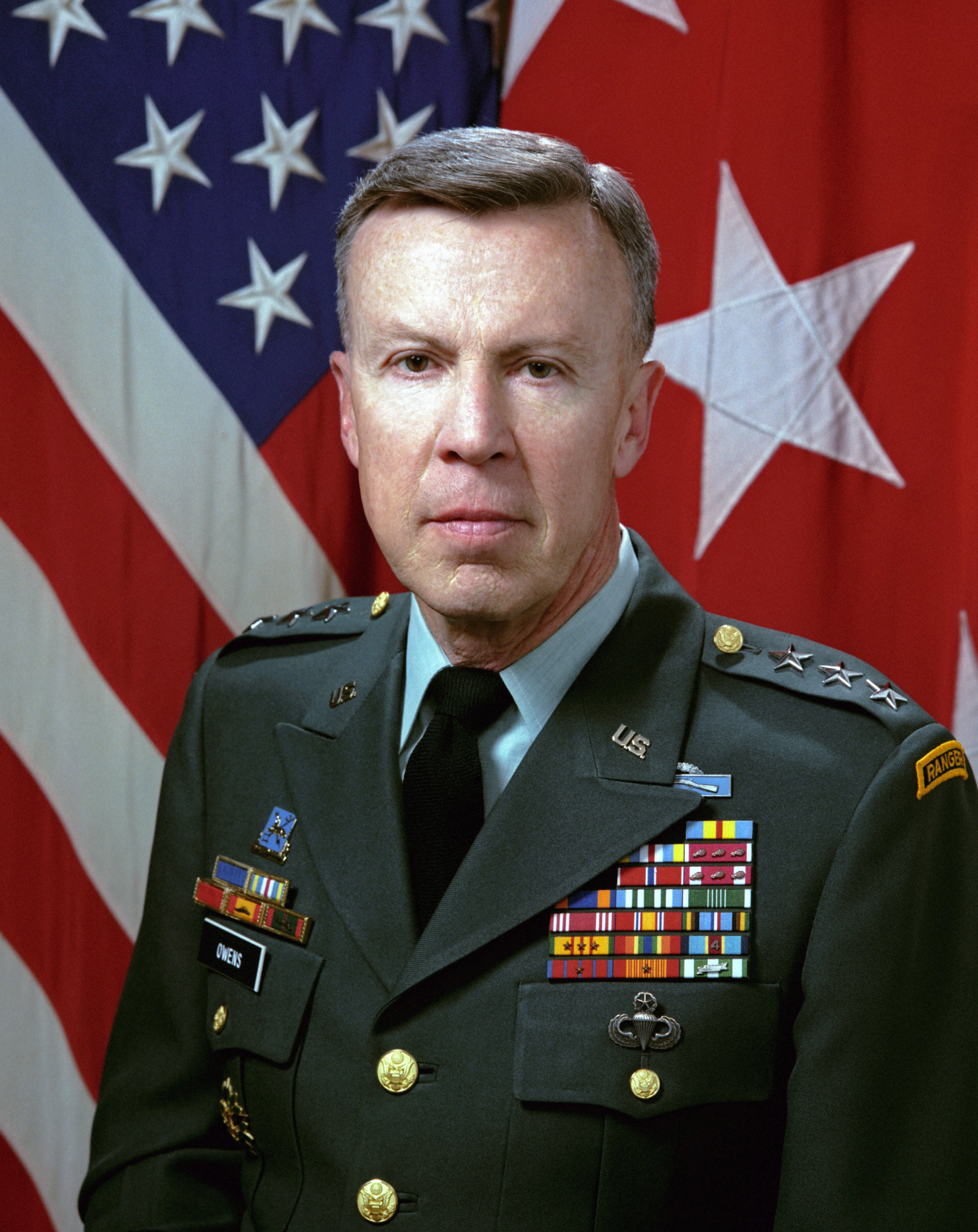
- LTG Ira C. Owens
- Born: July 31, 1936; Cortez, Colorado, U.S.
- Died: June 25, 2026 (aged 89)
- Military career
- Allegiance: United States of America
- Branch: United States Army
- Service years: 1956–1995
- Rank: Lieutenant General
- Conflicts: Cold War; Vietnam War
- Awards: Defense Distinguished Service Medal; Army Distinguished Service Medal; Defense Superior Service Medal; Legion of Merit (4); Bronze Star Medal; Order of Military Merit; Meritorious Service Medal (4); Air Medal

Ira Charles Owens (July 31, 1936 – June 25, 2026) was an American officer in the United States Army. From October 1991 to February 1995, Owens, then a Lieutenant General, served as the Deputy Chief of Staff for Intelligence, Headquarters, Department of the Army.

Owens was born in Cortez, Colorado. He was a 1954 graduate of Montrose High School in Montrose, Colorado, where he was known by his middle name Charles. Owens enlisted in the Army in 1956 and graduated from Artillery Officer Candidate School in 1960. He held a B.A. degree in international relations from Whittier College and an M.S. degree in public affairs from Shippensburg State College.

Owens died on June 25, 2026, at the age of 89. He is a member of the Military Intelligence Hall of Fame.

== Awards and decorations ==
Owens' military awards included:

Order of Military Merit (Commander, 1992; Brazil)
