= Charles Thomas (umpire) =

South African cricket umpire (1840–1923)

Personal information
- Full name: Charles Neumann Thomas
- Born: 18 March 1840
- Died: 29 November 1923 (aged 83)

Umpiring information
- Tests umpired: 1 (1892)
- Source: Cricinfo, 7 June 2019

Charles Thomas (18 March 1840 – 29 November 1923) was a South African cricket umpire. He stood in one Test match, South Africa vs. England, in 1892.

== See also ==
- List of Test cricket umpires
