= Doris Ilda Allen =

American military intelligence specialist (1927–2024)

- Arrival in Vietnam in 1967 (center)
- Born: May 9, 1927; El Paso, Texas, U.S.
- Died: June 11, 2024 (aged 97); Oakland, California, U.S.
- Military career
- Allegiance: United States
- Branch: Women's Army Corps
- Service years: 1950–1980
- Rank: chief warrant officer 3
- Nickname: "Lucki"
- Unit: 519th Military Intelligence Battalion
- Conflicts: Korean War; Vietnam War; Cold War
- Awards: Bronze Star Medal (3)

Doris "Lucki" Ilda Allen (1927–2024) was an American physical education teacher who joined the US Army in its Women's Army Corps (WAC) in 1950. She became a military intelligence specialist and did three tours of duty in Vietnam. For predicting the Tet Offensive and her other achievements, she was inducted into the Military Intelligence Hall of Fame in 2009.

== Early life and education ==
She was the youngest of five children of Richard and Stella Allen who worked as a barber and cook, respectively. She studied physical education at the Tuskegee Institute and, after graduating, taught at a high school in Greenwood, Mississippi for a year before enlisting.

== Woman's Army Corps ==
She auditioned for the WAC band, playing the trumpet but was not accepted. Instead, she played in a show that toured army bases. These included the Presidio of San Francisco where she played with André Previn. She also served in other specialities including information and journalism.

Her nickname of "Lucki" came from association with her older sister who was known as "Jinx" for having bad luck, especially with her car. Her sister, Jewel, was also a WAC and commanded her when she was a broadcast specialist at Camp Stoneman.

== Vietnam War ==
Allen then learnt French, interrogation and other intelligence skills and did three tours of duty in the Vietnam War, starting in 1967. She gathered intelligence and wrote a report which correctly predicted the Tet Offensive ahead of its start in 1968 but this warning was ignored. Her later warnings included an ambush, chemical weapons and rockets and these were more effective. On her third tour, she led a team of forty Vietnamese translators in Saigon that analysed enemy documents. Her name started to appear in the documents as a target for the Viet Cong and she then decided that it was time to return home.

== Post war and retirement ==
Allen was awarded three Bronze Stars for her service in Vietnam. Back in the US, she became the first full-time female instructor of prisoner interrogation at the Army Intelligence Center and then became a counterintelligence specialist. She retired from the military in 1980 and was inducted into the Military Intelligence Hall of Fame in 2009. She was the second black woman to get this recognition, following Mary Bowser.

After military service, she studied psychology, gaining a doctorate in clinical psychology at the Wright Institute in 1986. In 2014, she wrote her memoir, Three Days Past Yesterday: A Black Woman’s Journey Through Incredibility.

Allen and her sister bought a house in the hills of Oakland when they were stationed there in 1968. They both lived there together after retiring from the army; her sister died in 2009. Allen lived in the home until the COVID-19 pandemic, when she moved to an assisted living apartment. She died in an Oakland hospital on June 11, 2024, at the age of 97.
