= Charlie Thomas (running back) =

American football player (born 1948)

No. 49
- Positions: Running back, return specialist

Personal information
- Born: November 27, 1948 (age 77); Houston, Texas, U.S.
- Listed height: 5 ft 9 in (1.75 m)
- Listed weight: 180 lb (82 kg)

Career information
- High school: Phillis Wheatley (Houston)
- College: Tennessee State (1968–1972)
- NFL draft: 1973: undrafted

Career history
- Miami Dolphins (1974)*; Kansas City Chiefs (1975); New Orleans Saints (1976)*; Detroit Lions (1977)*
- * Offseason or practice squad member only
- Stats at Pro Football Reference

Charles Ray Thomas (born November 27, 1948) is an American former professional football running back and return specialist who played for the Kansas City Chiefs of the National Football League (NFL). He played college football for the Tennessee State Tigers. He led the Chiefs in return yards during the 1975 season.

== Early life ==
Charles Ray Thomas was born on November 27, 1948, in Houston, Texas. He attended Phillis Wheatley High School in Houston.

== College career ==
Thomas was a member of the Tennessee State Tigers football team from 1968 to 1972. As a senior in 1972, he was mostly used as a punt/kick returner but became the starting running back midway through the year. While at Tennessee State, Thomas attracted attention for the large amount of family members that attended his games. They drove a school bus from Houston to wherever the games were. He was one of 18 children. Thomas missed the final game of his senior year due to a knee injury. Tennessee State head coach John Merritt said that Thomas "may be the best running back of his size we've ever had".

== Professional career ==
Thomas went undrafted in the 1973 NFL draft. He was signed by the Miami Dolphins in 1974 as "filler" for the 1974 NFL strike. He was listed at 5'9" and 180 pounds but The Miami News said those numbers were exaggerated. During training camp, he acquired the nickname "Little Bit" among teammates. On August 10, 1974, he scored two punt return touchdowns (one 66-yarder and one 90-yarder) in a 45–20 victory over the New Orleans Saints. He also rushed nine times for 30 yards. Thomas was released before the start of the regular season.

Thomas signed with the Kansas City Chiefs in 1975. He had an impressive preseason. On August 23 against the Detroit Lions, he returned six punts for 88 yards and a touchdown while also returning three kicks for 82 yards. Chiefs head coach Paul Wiggin decided to keep Thomas on the 43-man roster as a return specialist. Thomas played in the first two games of the regular season before missing the month of October with a hamstring injury. He then played in five games in November. After injuries in the team's secondary, Wiggin decided that the Chiefs no longer had room on the 43-man roster for a return specialist. Thomas was then released on December 3, 1975, with his spot on the roster being filled by defensive back Hise Austin. Despite only playing in seven games, Thomas led the team in both kick return yards and punt return yards that season, returning 22 kicks for 516 yards and 12 punts for 112 yards. He also fumbled twice, recovering one of them. The one he did not recover was a kickoff that bounced off his facemask as Thomas could not see the ball very well due to bright lights in the stadium.

Thomas was signed by the Saints on March 27, 1976. He was released on August 4, 1976, after the first preseason game.

Thomas signed with the Lions in 1977 but was released.

== Personal life ==
Thomas was a substitute teacher in Houston during the NFL offseason.
