= Indonesian Army Intelligence Centre =

Indonesian Army Intelligence Center
- Pusat Intelijen TNI Angkatan Darat (Pusintelad)
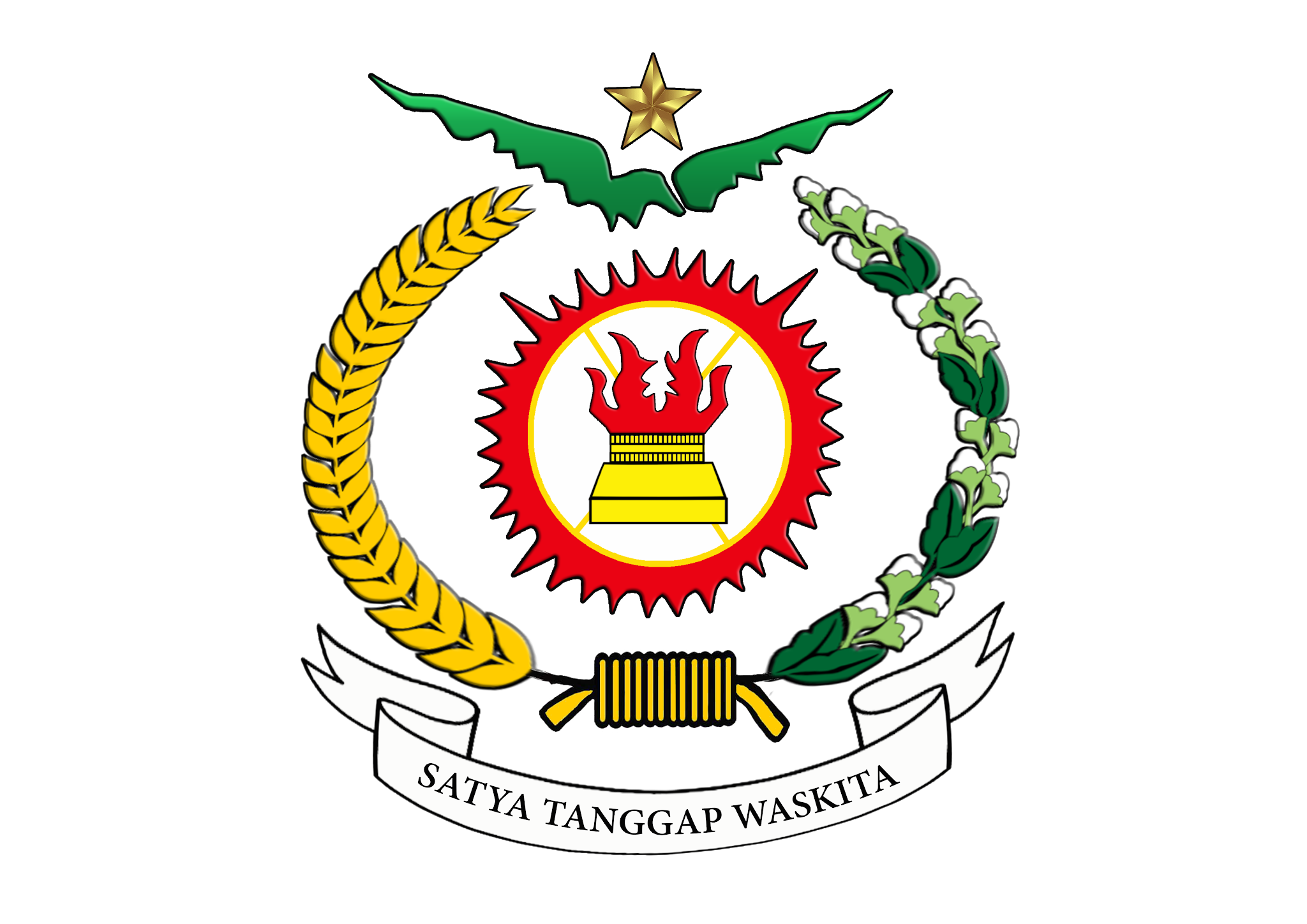
- Indonesian Army Intelligence Center Logo
- Founded: 9 January 1978
- Country: Indonesia
- Branch: Indonesian Army
- Role: Intelligence gathering for the Indonesian Army
- Part of: Indonesian National Armed Forces (TNI)
- Motto(s): Satya Tanggap Waskita ("Loyal, Perceptive, Clairvoyant")
- Website: tniad.mil.id/website/pusat-intelijen

The Indonesian Army Intelligence Center (Indonesian: Pusat Intelijen TNI Angkatan Darat abbreviated "Pusintelad") is one of the Central Executive Agencies under the Indonesian Army HQ which reports to the Chief of Staff of the Army. Pusintelad is in charge of conducting Army intelligence activities to support the Army's main operational duties. It is led by an army brigadier general.

== History ==
During the Indonesian War of Independence, intelligence activities were conducted by the Intelligence Staff Bureau within the Indonesian National Armed Forces HQ to provide information for both government and military. Around the 1950s and along with the development of the Army's organization, an intelligence function was introduced within the Army's HQ with the name of the "Army's General Staff I", which consisted of three bureaus (Bureau-1 Operational Intelligence and Security, Bureau-2 Administration, and Bureau-3 Training and Organization). In 1964, the Army's General Staff I officially become the Army's Intelligence Agency and there were name changes from 1964 until 1997 for this unit. Finally after a long process, in 1997 the official name Pusat Intelijen Angkatan Darat (meaning "Army Intelligence Center") was legally used till now.

== See also ==
- BAIS TNI, Indonesian National Armed Forces Strategic Intelligence Agency
- BIN, Indonesian State Intelligence Agency
