= Charles Armand Étienne Thomas =

French painter

Charles Armand Etienne Thomas (1857–1892) was a French painter. He painted still lifes and landscapes of the sea.
