= Lawrence S. Thomas III =

United States Air Force general

Lawrence S. Thomas III is a retired American brigadier general, most recently assigned as the chief of staff and commander of the New Jersey Air National Guard at Fort Dix, New Jersey.

He graduated from Ohio University in 1977, and he received his commission as an Ensign in the United States Navy that August. After becoming a Naval Aviator, Thomas qualified in the F-14 Tomcat aircraft and was assigned to the USS Nimitz. He attended and graduated from the United States Navy Fighter Weapons School (TOPGUN) in 1981, and was one of the Navy's initial cadre for the F/A-18 Hornet.

Thomas joined the New Jersey Air National Guard in 1986 as a member of the 177th Fighter Wing in Atlantic City, after spending almost a decade aboard the USS Nimitz, NAS Lemoore, California and NAS Oceana, Virginia. He has participated in many missions, including deployment to Canada, Key West, and Saudi Arabia to enforce the southern no-fly zone in Iraq, F-16 contingency missions over New York City, Washington D. C., and Camp David following the September 11, 2001 attacks. He has served as the operations officer for the 119th Fighter Squadron and both the Vice Commander and then Commander of the 177th Fighter Wing.

In 2003, he served as the commander of the 108th Air Refueling Wing during the wing's mobilization for Operation Iraqi Freedom. He continues to command the 108th and 177th Wings as the commander of the New Jersey Air National Guard. During his tenure as commander, Thomas has engaged at the national level, including in the Base Realignment and Closure (BRAC) process.

Thomas has received several decorations, including the Meritorious Service Medal with bronze oak leaf cluster; the Aerial Achievement Medal; the Air Force Commendation Medal with three oak leaf clusters; the Air Force Organizational Excellence Award; a Navy Unit Commendation; a Navy "E" Ribbon; the Navy Expeditionary Medal; the National Defense Service Medal with one bronze star; the Armed Forces Expeditionary Medal; the Global War on Terrorism Service Medal; the Sea Service Ribbon with two bronze stars; the Air Force Longevity Service Award with four oak leaf clusters; an Air Force Training Ribbon; and several awards and decorations from the New Jersey National Guard.
