= Charles W. Thomas (psychologist) =

African American psychologist

Charles William Thomas II (April 24, 1926 – September 29, 1990) was an African American psychologist and one of the founders of the Association of Black Psychologists. He was regarded as the "father of Black psychology" and worked towards social advancements and psychological theories for people who are Black.

== Early life and education ==
Charles William Thomas II was born on April 24, 1926, in Davidsonville, Maryland. He was the first of seven children, having five sisters and one brother. His parents were Estelle Thomas and Charles Thomas. After serving in the U.S. Army during World War II, Thomas attended Morgan State University, in his home state. He earned a Bachelor's degree in Psychology in 1954. After earning his bachelor's degree, Thomas earned his Master of Arts at John Carroll University in 1955. While he was a graduate student at John Carroll University, Thomas also worked as an intern in Clinical Psychology for the Cleveland Receiving Hospital. After he obtained his Master's degree, Thomas worked for a rehabilitation and vocational guidance center in Cleveland, Ohio. During this time, he completed his Ph.D. in Developmental Psychology at Case Western Reserve.

== Academic career ==
Once he finished his academic training, Thomas taught at John Carroll University for two years. He was then an Assistant Professor at the University of Oregon for three years. During his professorship at the University of Oregon, Thomas was one of the first African American professors at that university. While at the University of Oregon, he created more diversity initiatives on campus. For his diversity initiatives, Thomas invited African American musicians, singers, and comedians to perform on campus.

Thomas was not having the impact he wanted to have at the University of Oregon, and as such, he accepted a role as an Associate Professor of Community Medicine at the University of Southern California. Over the next three years, Thomas directed the Center for the Study of Racial and Social Issues. He stayed at the University of Southern California for two years before becoming a professor of Urban and Rural Studies at the University of California, San Diego, where he worked until his murder in 1990.

While at UC-San Diego, Thomas focused on connecting with the local community. He aimed to bring together the community and the new urban planning studies undergraduate program. Thomas's efforts allowed for an awareness inside the community and university that would impact social change. He also helped the university partner with Valencia Park Elementary School to create a program of reform to assist students. As his wife, Shirley Wade, was also a psychologist and professor at UC-San Diego, they worked together to mentor students and help them reach their goals. They encouraged their students to "plan your work, and work your plan," and many students described the Thomas' having a significant impact on the trajectory of their lives.

== Community Involvement and Civil Rights ==
To aid his mission in connecting the local community, Thomas became an active member of the community and intentionally worked towards societal betterment. He served on the advisory boards of the Los Angeles County Head Start Program and the Southern Regional Education Association, the Curriculum Development Committee and the Board of Overseers of the California School of Professional Psychology, and was appointed to the California State Board of Education Commission on Curriculum Materials and Instructional Development, and the Education and Training Board of the American Psychological Association. He was one of the earliest Black Psychology Examination Commissioners on the California Board of Medical Quality Assurance, Psychology Examination Committee.

He performed leadership roles in the National Association for the Advancement of Colored People, the Urban League, PUSH, and the Black Federation of San Diego. He was also a member of the Citizens' Advisory Committee of the San Diego County Model Cities Program, the Steering Committee of the Citizens Advisory Desegregation/Integration Committee of the San Diego Unified School District, and the Mexican American Foundation.

Thomas was a strong advocate for Black people and a proponent of the Civil Rights Movement. He often quoted Fredrick Douglass and encouraged Black people to live their lives without shame or fear of judgment.

== Association of Black Psychologists (ABPsi) ==
Thomas was one of the founders of the Association of Black Psychologists (ABPsi). This professional activity helped Thomas become known as the "Father of Black Psychology." ABPsi was created in 1968 in a direct response to the American Psychological Association (APA) as they believed that the APA gave "inadequate positive measures condoned white racist character of the American Society, and failed to recognize the new Black movement as the most promising model for solving problems stemming from the oppressive effect of American racism." ABPsi also identifies three core problems that they hope their organization can resolve. These problems are: "The extremely limited number of Black psychologists, Black graduate students, and Black students in the undergraduate program; the failure of the American Psychological Association to direct its scientific and professional energies toward the solution of prominent social concerns, particularly the issues of poverty and racism and; the fact that the general organizational structure of the American Psychological Association reflects a serious lack of adequate representation of Black Psychologists."

Many of Thomas' beliefs and works were likely instrumental in informing the mission of ABPsi. He believed that white psychologists would not work to create a new system that included Black psychologists as long as the system benefits them. He believed that white psychologists would find logical ways to justify the status quo through traditional instruments that are not inclusive, pathologizing other cultures, and integrationism.

ABPsi continues to be an important organization in psychology today. They have over 1400 members, have become a central hub for Black psychologists, fund projects for Black psychologists, and work with other organizations to help further their mission. ABPsi has now been around for over 56 years and continues to grow. This organization would not be possible without the work and dedication of Thomas and the other founders.

== Scholarship ==
As one of the founders of the ABP, Thomas shaped the early history of Black psychology within American universities. Thomas wanted more respect and engagement from those who were a part of the "radical" schools. Thomas wanted Black people to feel that they belonged in U.S. society and that they had purpose regardless of their racial identity. Thomas fought for the idea that Black people should have an equal place in the United States.

== Publications and Presentations ==
=== "Boys No More" ===
In October 1968, Thomas published a paper titled "Boys No More: Some Social Psychological Aspects of the New Black Ethic." Thomas started this article by noting that people oftentimes will use others to help themselves. These people would classify others as inferior and, in doing so, they would be able to remain in a position of power and influence. Thomas recorded that society managed to keep racial groups within a subordinate role for a long time, including in such institutions as formal education.

In this article, Thomas penned that Black people should be able to do things they want without shame. This included wearing a natural hairstyle or wearing clothes that are recognized as traditionally African American. Most importantly, Thomas wanted people to be confident in being able to achieve their goals.

Thomas stated that Black mobilization was the best chance to have more freedom and justice for the Black community. Black mobilization involved having people willing to say that they are proud of being Black. Black mobilization also meant unifying the Black community. Thomas ended his article by relaying that now is a time for being proactive rather than sitting back and hoping change happens.

=== "Blackness as a Personality Construct" ===
On April 15, 1973, Thomas presented to the XIVth International Congress of Psychology. In this presentation, he proposed that social climates and oppression can influence the development of personality. Therefore, people who are Black are bound to have different coping skills and social behaviors. He believed that political choices and freedoms can allow psychological freedom. Thomas purported that people's social roles and activities will influence their self-expression, social adaptation, and therefore their personality. He believed that assumptions on behavior would make more sense and be more predictable if one takes into account the political climate and society the person is involved in.

=== "Challenges of Change" ===
On November 8, 1968, Thomas wrote in "Challenges of Change" that every person faces societal challenges. Some of these challenges include factors such as age, sex, and racial identity. Thomas claimed that socially disengaged or minority groups are the victims of not having adequate freedom. Thomas acknowledged that change can be a scary thing that people shy away from because change is intimidating.

Thomas noted that society should not blame Black people for the United States' problems. He wrote that Black people ought to be able to function within society without being looked at as "mentally ill" or "inferior." This included housing and job employment that were adequate as neither were adequate or sanitary for a healthy life. Thomas ended his remarks by conveying the challenges within society that were becoming more intense. In addition, he contended that more effort needed to be put towards finding a solution rather than ignoring the problem of racism in the U.S.

== Personal life ==
Thomas was married to Shirley Wade, an educational sociologist, and they had two children, Charles III and Shawn Leilane. Together with his wife, they invited students into their home and offered them support and mentoring. As a team, the two would conduct field studies in the United States and abroad on Black ethnicity as a psychological model for developing social competence. However, his wife died one year prior to his murder.

== Death ==
On September 29, 1990, an unknown assailant stabbed and murdered Thomas with a knife. He was stabbed multiple times and found slumped over the steering wheel of his car, begging for help. Thomas was rushed to a nearby California hospital, where he underwent emergency surgery. Thomas died from his wounds. Authorities were never able to identify the assailant or determine their motive for murdering Thomas.
