= Charles John Thomas =

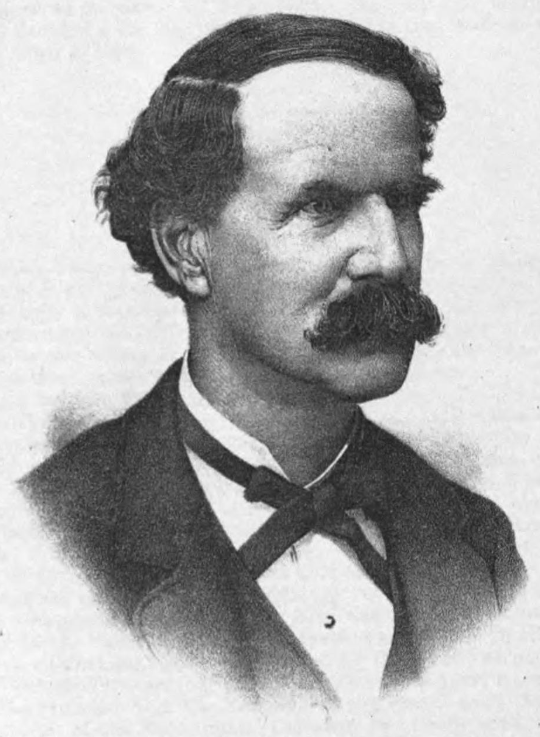

Background information
- Born: November 30, 1832; Burnley, Lancashire, England
- Died: March 31, 1919 (aged 86); Salt Lake City, Utah, United States
- Occupation: Conductor

Signature
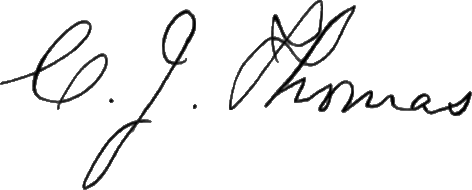

Charles John Thomas (November 20, 1832 – March 31, 1919) was the director of the Mormon Tabernacle Choir, now the Tabernacle Choir at Temple Square, for part of the 1860s, and was involved in several other musical endeavors in early Utah.

== Biography ==
Thomas was born in Burnley, Lancashire, England. His parents were Joseph K. Thomas and Margaret Spotswood. Charles J. Thomas was a member of an orchestra with his father by the age of nine, playing at the Theatre Royal. He had been trained up to this point in music by his father, who made his living in orchestras. In 1851 he joined the Church of Jesus Christ of Latter-day Saints (LDS Church). The rest of his family joined the LDS Church shortly afterward, following his being healed after being administered to by elders of the church.

During the 1850s, Thomas traveled with an Italian opera company and some of his compositions were played at London theatres.

In 1861, Thomas emigrated to Utah Territory. Among the first things Thomas did on arriving in Utah was taking over the band of the late Ballo. He not only lead the Tabernacle Choir for a time but was also the first orchestral director at the Salt Lake Theatre. From 1862 until 1865 Thomas was director of the Tabernacle Choir. He was the first director to lead the choir in the current Salt Lake Tabernacle building. From 1865 until 1871, Thomas lived first in the St. George area and then in Beaver, Utah. In both locations he was involved in organizing choirs and teaching music.

Thomas was asked by Brigham Young to return to Salt Lake City in 1871 and again take the lead of the Salt Lake Theatre Orchestra. In the following years in Salt Lake City Thomas formed the first male glee club in Salt Lake City in 1876. He also taught music lessons in Salt Lake City, where he had among other students Heber J. Grant.

In 1887, Thomas served as a Mormon missionary in Great Britain. After his return to Salt Lake City, he was head of music for the Salt Lake Temple. He also was appointed by Evan Stephens to direct a choir made up of those members of the Tabernacle Choir that did not go to the World's Fair in Chicago in 1893 and thus provide music at the Tabernacle while most of the Tabernacle Choir was absent.

Thomas married Charlotte Gibbs. Charlotte died in 1875 and in 1878 Thomas married Amy H. Adams. Between his two wives Thomas had a total of 13 children, however only six of his children were alive in 1904, the rest having died primarily at very early ages.

However, there was at least one other "wife" with whom he had children. The death certificate of his daughter, Anna Thomas Piercey (b. 14 Sep 1866), reflects her mother to be Annie Chunn. Anna, was a member of the Utah State House of Representatives in 1919 and 1920 and again in 1929 and 1930 as well as a Democratic delegate to the 1935 presidential nominating convention in 1936 that nominated President Franklin D. Roosevelt. She was a suffragist invited by the speaker of the Utah House to take the speaker's chair during the roll call in connection with Utah's ratification of the 19th Amendment (appropriately in 1919) to the United States Constitution granting women the right to vote. Her son Joseph Knowles (J.K.) Piercey (Charles Thomas's grandson) was chief of the Salt Lake City fire department from 1943 to 1959 and later served as Salt Lake City public safety commissioner until his death in April 1961. Anna had another son, Charles J., and a daughter "Mrs. L.P. O'Brien." A newspaper article on the death of Anna Thomas noted that she was survived by two brothers and a sister and nine grandchildren. Charles, Annie, Anna, and J.K. have many more descendents, but as of this writing, what happened to Annie is a mystery.

Thomas's sister Margaret married George Romney (1831–1920), who was a brother of Miles Park Romney, the grandfather of George W. Romney, and the great-grandfather of Mitt Romney.

Among the works written by Thomas was the music to "Sons of Michael, He Approaches", a hymn that was in previous Latter-day Saint hymnals, but is not contained in the latest English-language hymnal of the LDS Church. He also wrote pieces titled "Harken and Lo a Voice" and "Harken, O Gentiles" in the 1850s.

He died at his home in Salt Lake City on March 31, 1919.
