= Oliver W. Dillard =

United States Army general (1926–2015)

Oliver W. Dillard Sr.
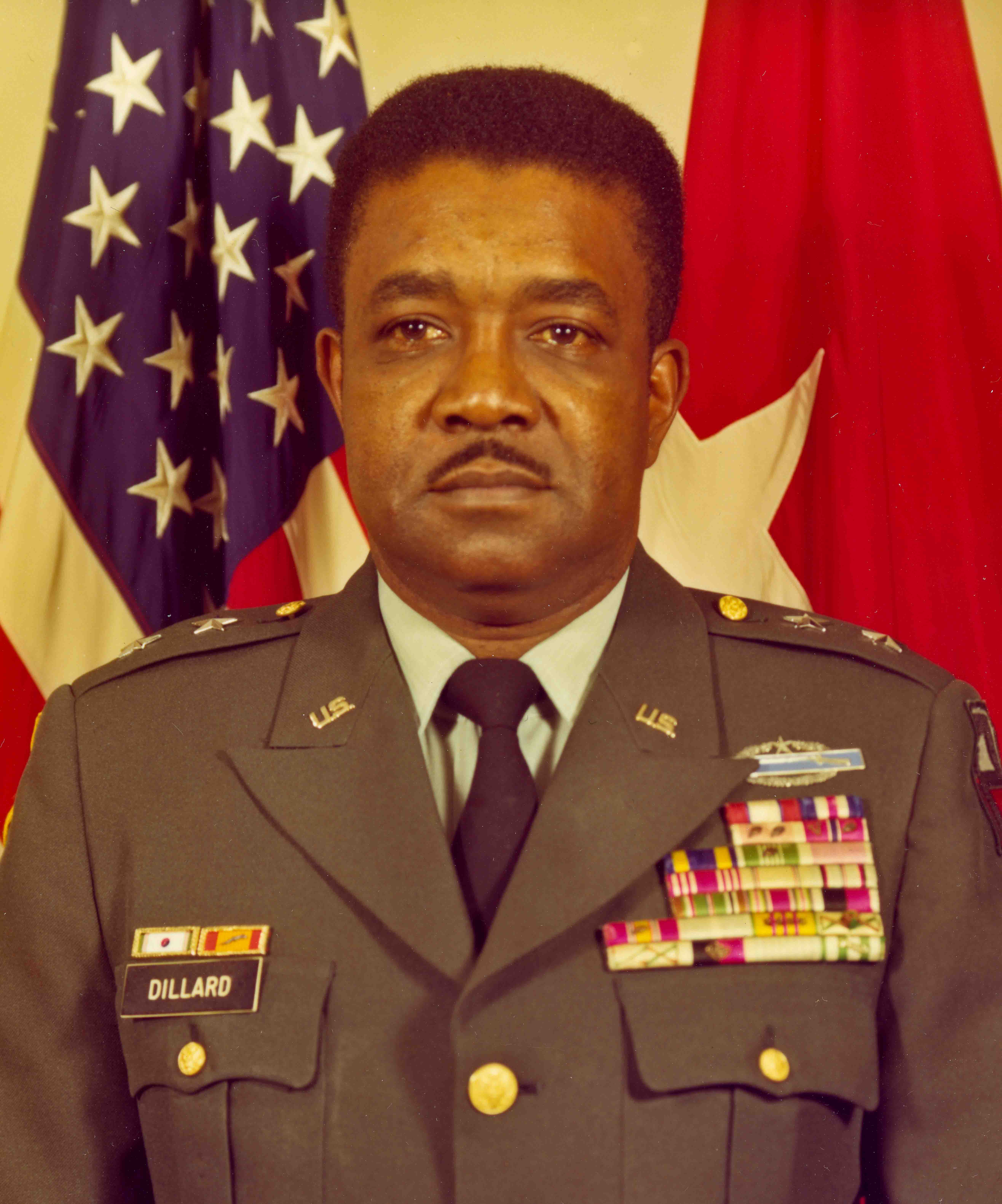
- Born: September 28, 1926; Margaret, Alabama, U.S.
- Died: June 16, 2015 (aged 88); Canton, Michigan, U.S.
- Military career
- Allegiance: United States
- Branch: United States Army
- Service years: 1945–1980
- Rank: Major General
- Nickname: "Ollie"
- Conflicts: World War II; Korean War; Vietnam War
- Awards: Distinguished Service Medal (2); Silver Star; Legion of Merit (3); Bronze Star (2) with "V" Device; Purple Heart; Air Medal; Army Commendation Medal (2); Combat Infantry Badge 2nd Award

Oliver Williams Dillard Sr. (September 28, 1926 – June 16, 2015) was a United States Army major general, the fifth black officer in the U.S. Army to attain flag rank. He was a member of the Military Intelligence Hall of Fame and Officer Candidate School Hall of Fame, at Fort Huachuca, Arizona and Fort Benning, Georgia respectively.

General Dillard became the first black graduate of the National War College in 1965. He also served as the first black general officer in the Office of the Assistant Chief of Staff for Intelligence, the last J2 (senior Intelligence officer) for the U.S. Military Assistance Command – Vietnam, the first U.S. Army Forces Command Deputy Chief of Staff, Intelligence, and the first black Deputy Chief of Staff, Intelligence for the U.S. Army Europe. Dillard retired from the U.S. Army in 1980, after a career spanning 34 years.

== Early life ==
Born in Margaret, Alabama, Dillard was the son of Josiephine Dillard (née Williams) and Stonewall Jackson Dillard. His father was a graduate of Tuskegee Institute and a school teacher. In 1942, Oliver graduated Valedictorian from Fairfield Industrial High School in Fairfield, Alabama, and received a scholarship to Tuskegee Institute. One of Tuskegee's top students, he was elected to the Alpha Kappa Mu National Honor Society. He was a Tuskegee Institute Army Reserve Officers' Training Corps (ROTC) student for two years and student instructor for one year. Dillard received the Outstanding ROTC Student Award for 1943 and 1944. He was also their American Legion Honor Medal award winner.

== Education ==
Dillard postponed his academic studies after being drafted in 1945. Following attendance at the United States Army Command and General Staff College (class of 1957/1958), he completed his Bachelor of Science degree at the University of Omaha, now the University of Nebraska at Omaha. He also attended George Washington University, where he received a Master of Science in International Affairs in 1965. Dillard completed the National War College at Fort Lesley J. McNair, District of Columbia that year.

== Military career ==
Dillard began Basic Training at Fort McClellan, Alabama near the end of World War II, in June 1945. US Army troop transports afterwards delivered Dillard and his group of Black replacements to Bremerhaven en route to Weißenburg in Bayern, Germany, and an assignment to 349th Field Artillery Group. Dillard was selected to serve as company clerk upon his arrival on January 1, 1946. He worked his way through the ranks and was rewarded, attaining Technical Sergeant.

Commissioned officer

Dillard successfully completed the OCS selection process and was approved for attendance at the Infantry OCS at Fort Benning in January 1947. He received a commission as a Second Lieutenant of Infantry after graduating from Infantry OCS in July 1947. Second Lieutenant Dillard was the Honor Graduate of his Infantry Officers Basic Course. Subsequently, he was assigned to the 365th Infantry Regiment at Fort Dix, New Jersey, where he held numerous assignments as a lieutenant ending as a Battalion S3. In June 1950, he joined the 3rd Battalion, 24th Infantry, 25th Infantry Division stationed at Camp Gifu, Gifu, Japan.

=== Korean War ===
Lieutenant Dillard deployed with the 24th Infantry Regiment to the Republic of Korea as part of the response to North Korean aggression. Upon landing at Pusan, Dillard and the 25th Infantry Division were initially positioned some one hundred miles north of Pusan and given the mission of blocking and delaying advancing North Korean forces moving down the Naktong River valley from the northwest.

On July 21, 1950, Dillard's platoon was the lead element as the 3rd Battalion, 24th Infantry — supported by other elements of the 24th Regimental Combat Team — conducted the first major offensive mission by the 25th Infantry Division with its recapture of the vital road junction town of Yecheon driving out the North Korean defenders, and repulsing a North Korean attempts to retake the town. It was considered by the Congress and the United States Department of Defense as the first sizable American ground victory of the war. A thorough accounting of Dillard's exploits are described in Lieutenant Colonel (Retired) Bradley Biggs' October 2003 Military Review article, "The 'Deuce-Four' in Korea." A veteran of the 555th Parachute Infantry Battalion (United States), Colonel Biggs described General Dillard as "a superb officer" and commended him for his use of surprise and speed during the battle of Yecheon. Following recovery in Japan from wounds received on August 6, 1950, Dillard received his first Military Intelligence assignment as a Battalion S2.

While Dillard was assigned as the Battalion S2 for 3rd Battalion, 24th Infantry Regiment (United States), he was awarded the Silver Star for his actions near Masan, Republic of Korea from September 14–15, 1950. While setting the defense of the battalion with his Battalion Commander, Lieutenant Colonel Melvin Blair, Dillard responded to enemy action occurring in Company L's area. He and a small group reinforced the company defense location and fought with heroic effectiveness. His assistant division commander, Brigadier General Joseph S. Bradley — a distinguished war hero from World War II and Korea — awarded the Silver Star to Captain Dillard.

Following his year in combat and participation in five campaigns, Captain Dillard returned to the United States and attended the Infantry Officers Advanced Course where he graduated 6th in his class. In 1952 to 1954, he served as assistant professor of military science at North Carolina Agricultural and Technical State University in Greensboro, North Carolina. Dillard imparted his recent Korea experience and his experiences as an ROTC cadet at Tuskegee Institute to his North Carolina A&T cadets, including Charles Bussey, who became a major general and served as chief of Army public affairs from 1984 to 1987.

=== Post Korean War ===
In 1954, Captain Dillard was assigned to 4th Infantry Division (United States) in Gelnhausen, Federal Republic of Germany, where he commanded Company C, 1st Battalion, 12th Infantry Regiment (United States). After observing then Captain Dillard for several months, the Regimental Commander — Colonel (later Major General) Kenneth W. Collins — moved him to the position of Regimental Communications Officer, a position of importance to a Cold War infantry unit. When the 4th Infantry Division was inactivated, General Dillard became the Chief, Map Reading Committee at the Seventh Army Noncommissioned Officers Academy in Munich, Germany.

Following his Germany assignment, Major Dillard graduated from the Army Command and General Staff College (CGSC), where he was one of only three Black officers in his class, in 1958. He graduated in the top third of his class. After CGSC, he completed his bachelor's degree at the University of Omaha under the Army's Bootstrap Program, which leveraged his earlier studies at Tuskegee Institute.

Major Dillard was subsequently assigned to the G3 Section, Headquarters First United States Army at Fort Jay, New York, and served as Operations and Plans Officer and subsequently as Exercise G3 for Exercises IROQUOIS HATCHET and MOHAWK ARROW. He departed First United States Army in December 1960 and was assigned to the U.S. Military Mission to Liberia, Monrovia, Liberia, initially as deputy Chief of Mission and later as the Operations Officer. He received unprecedented access to the Armed Forces of Liberia operations and intelligence planning process. Dillard became a valued coach and mentor to Liberian officers and assisted them in integrating advanced staff techniques and processes into their planning. He also helped prepare a Liberian company, designated the Reinforced Security Company, for assistance to the United Nations Operation in the Congo.

=== Vietnam War ===
==== Military Intelligence ====
After a number of years since his first Intelligence assignment in Korea, Lieutenant Colonel Dillard was assigned to Office of the Assistant Chief of Staff for Intelligence (ACSI), Department of the Army in 1963. He used his recent experiences in Korea, Germany and Africa to adeptly lead the Foreign Intelligence Assistance Section, Special Warfare and Foreign Assistance Branch, with an additional duty as Chief of Europe, Africa, and Middle East Section. In 1965, Dillard graduated from the National War College; the first Black officer to do so. Subsequently, he was assigned to the Special Studies Directorate, US Army Combat Developments Command's Institute of Special Studies at Fort Belvoir, Virginia, where he served as Operations and Training Staff Officer, Special Studies Division, and later as Chief of Analysis/ Coordination Branch, Study Division 3. In 1967, Colonel Dillard was assigned to command a battalion of the 5th Combat Support Training Brigade at Fort Dix, and later he commanded the Brigade for a year.

==== Advisor ====
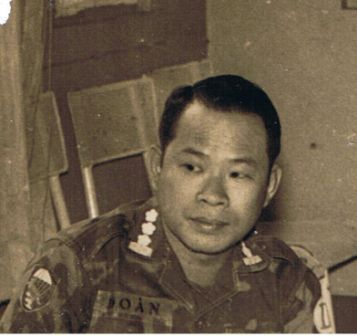
South Vietnam Province Chief, Nguyen Hop Doan, wearing the rank of Colonel.

Following attendance at the Foreign Service Institute's Vietnam Training Center in 1969, Colonel Dillard reported for duty at US Military Assistance Command, Vietnam (MAC-V) as a Province Senior Advisor (PSA) for Kon Tum Province. While assigned as the PSA for Advisory Team 41, Military Region II, his success was documented in the Washington Post as the example of how to build a close relationship with the Province Chief, Nguyen Hop Doan, and his civilian deputy, Ken Lyvers, a United States Agency for International Development employee. Colonel Dillard also worked with Joseph Hyim, who assisted him in interpreting a lot of documentation from Vietnamese to English. Together, they grew the Provincial and Popular Forces to defend the Province and organized the villages and hamlets — Vietnamese and Montagnard — to feed and protect themselves.

In 1971, after two years of exemplary service in the PSA Program, General Dillard returned to the Office of ACSI, the Army Staff, where he served as the Deputy Assistant Chief of Staff for Intelligence—the first Black officer in this position. From this position, he pushed hard to: (1) move the Army Intelligence Center to Fort Huachuca, Arizona; his testimony before Congress was compelling; (2) further develop the MI branch; (3) get tactical MI Battalions in the Divisions; and (4) field the Guardrail aerial platform. Secretary of the Army Robert F. Froehlke pinned on Dillard's star—promoting him to Brigadier General, and making him the fifth Black general in Army history and arguably its first Black Intelligence general officer—at a Pentagon ceremony, which was covered by The Afro-American newspaper.

==== Vietnam Senior Staff Officer ====
At the behest of General Frederick C. Weyand, General Dillard returned to MAC-V headquarters in Saigon for duty as Deputy Assistant Chief of Staff, Civil Operations and Rural Development Support (CORDS). In this position, he worked with General Weyand and Ambassador William Colby on CORDS plans and operations throughout Vietnam. Following the signing of the Paris Peace Accords and as American and third country forces began withdrawing from Vietnam, General Dillard was assigned as MAC-V's last Director of Intelligence, and departed on March 29, 1973, when MAC-V disbanded.

=== Post Vietnam War ===
==== Senior Intelligence Officer ====
As part of Operation STEADFAST, General Dillard served as first Deputy Chief of Staff, Intelligence (DCSINT) for the new United States Army Forces Command (FORSCOM) at Fort McPherson, Georgia. He and his staff addressed four major problems with intelligence organizations: (1) inadequate analytical capability; (2) lack of collection assets at the lower levels; (3) inadequacy of secure communications support; and (4) the "unwanted guests" mentality since the intelligence units were attached, not organic.

In 1974, Major General Robert Leahy Fair selected General Dillard to be his Assistant Division Commander for Maneuver, 2nd Armored Division at Fort Hood, Texas. Having had recent Intelligence assignments, General Dillard worked diligently for operations-intelligence integration as the 2nd Armored Division prepared for its return of forces to Germany (Exercise Reforger) mission, and their annual Reforger exercise supporting the Army's operational plans.

From 1975 to 1978, Major General Dillard served as the DCSINT, United States Army Europe (USAREUR) and Seventh Army in Heidelberg, Germany, where Army Intelligence played a significant role in the defense of Europe. His use of United States Army Security Agency (ASA), and its successor United States Army Intelligence and Security Command (INSCOM), assets ensured a multi-disciplinary approach to understanding and countering Soviet forces at the height of the Cold War.

As his final assignment, Major General Dillard served as the Commanding General, United States Army Readiness Region II at Fort Dix, New Jersey until 1980 when he retired. He used his knowledge of combat arms and the Intelligence battlefield operating system to assess and train Reserve Component units assigned to First United States Army.

== Awards and decorations ==
General Dillard's military awards include the Distinguished Service Medal with one oak leaf cluster, Silver Star, Legion of Merit with two oak leaf clusters, Bronze Star with one oak leaf cluster and "V" device, Purple Heart, Air Medal, Combat Infantryman's Badge with star (two awards), Army Staff Identification Badge, and Vietnam Distinguished Service Order (1st and 2nd Class). Dillard also received two civilian awards from the Republic of Vietnam: the Vietnam Rural Revolutionary Development Medal and the Vietnam Ethnic Development Service Medal (1st Class).

Military awards
Combat Infantryman Badge with Star (2nd award)
Army Staff Identification Badge

Distinguished Service Medal (with oak leaf cluster)
Silver Star
Legion of Merit (with two oak leaf clusters)
Bronze Star (with oak leaf cluster and "V" device)
Purple Heart
Air Medal
Army Commendation Medal (with oak leaf cluster)
Army Good Conduct Medal
American Defense Service Medal
American Campaign Medal
European-African-Middle Eastern Campaign Medal
World War II Victory Medal
Army of Occupation Medal with Germany Campaign Clasp
National Defense Service Medal (with Star)
Korean Service Medal (with 5 Campaign Stars)
Vietnam Service Medal (with 5 Campaign Stars)
Vietnam Distinguished Service Order, 1st Class
Vietnam Distinguished Service Order, 2nd Class
United Nations Service Medal
Vietnam Campaign Medal
Korean War Service Medal
Presidential Unit Citation
Meritorious Unit Commendation
Republic of Korea Presidential Unit Citation
Vietnam Gallantry Cross Unit Citation with Palm

== Dates of rank ==
Second Lieutenant	First Lieutenant	Captain
O-1	O-2	O-3
July 9, 1947	January 24, 1949	October 10, 1950

Major	Lieutenant Colonel	Colonel
O-4	O-5	O-6
May 9, 1957	August 3, 1962	September 26, 1969

Brigadier General	Major General
O-7	O-8
February 1, 1972	August 1, 1975

== Retirement ==
General Dillard's contributions to the Army did not end on February 1, 1980, when he retired. As a result of his friendship with Lieutenant General Julius W. Becton Jr.—the VII Corps Commander at the time—and General Dillard's recent retirement, General Becton had General Dillard travel to various installations in Germany and speak as a part of Black History month activities. In March 1980, General Dillard participated in a Study conference, "Black Officer Accession and Retention," at the US Army War College that clarified information concerning the O-5 promotion articles that appeared in the Army Times; his inputs highlighted required actions for the Army to increase the number of Black officer and their quality.

Military Intelligence Corps Distinctive Insignia. MI Corps established July 1, 1987.

General Dillard was a 1974 charter member of The Rocks, Inc.—the largest professional military officers' organization with a majority African-American membership—and was committed to assisting with professional development and social events to improve the officer corps. He, and the 24th Infantry Regiment Association, led an effort to vindicate the actions of the 24th Infantry Regiment in Korea in 1950 and counter the history written by Roy Appleman in his book South to Naktong, North to the Yalu. He traveled to the Republic of Korea two times, and was interviewed numerous times for the Center for Military History's book Black Soldier/White Army. His efforts were also described in a November 1989 Los Angeles Times article by John Broder "COLUMN ONE: War and Black GIs' Memories." During one of General Dillard's visits to Korea, he spoke to a group of Black officers assembled from installations throughout the Korean Peninsula on his Korean War experiences and the importance of their service.

The Documentary "Battlefield Diaries – Episode 5: Last of the Buffalo Soldiers," which was released on December 1, 2006, attempted to tell the story of the last segregated regiment—the 24th Infantry Regiment—in U.S. military history. General Dillard's narrative in the documentary highlighted his experiences with the regiment from 1950 to 1951, and addressed the criticism levied on the "Deuce Four" for running or backing off. A few of the veterans appeared on camera to say that they never saw anyone run, but it spoke volumes when one of them summarized what the unit generated: "Two Congressional Medal of Honor winners, 15 Distinguished Service Crosses, 185 silver stars, over 2000 bronze stars and 2000 Purple Hearts ... now, are you a coward?"

General Dillard signed the controversial Generals And Admirals Who Have Signed A Statement Calling For Repeal Of "Don't Ask, Don't Tell" on November 18, 2008.

On June 1, 2011, Dillard was awarded the Military Intelligence Corps Association's LTC Thomas Knowlton Award for Excellence in Intelligence, commemorating his significant role in Army Military Intelligence history, beginning in 1950.

General Dillard was inducted into the Officer Candidate School Hall of Fame on May 4, 2012. On September 14, 2012, he was inducted into the Army Military Intelligence Hall of Fame, becoming the 226th recipient of this honor.

On October 25, 2013, General Dillard was inducted into the Alabama Military Hall of Honor at Marion, Alabama. The Hall was established in 1975 by then-Governor George Wallace and has inducted more than 50 military heroes.

The U.S. Army Forces Command (FORSCOM) established the "Major General Oliver W. Dillard Award" with the publication of FORSCOM Regulation 672–2 on May 21, 2014. The regulation pays tribute to the contributions of General Dillard as the first FORSCOM G2, and his impact on the Army and its Military Intelligence Corps. It recognizes the most outstanding military intelligence company-size unit assigned to a Brigade Combat Team in FORSCOM each year.

The Department of Veterans Affairs (VA) honored General Dillard by dedicating the Major General Oliver W. Dillard VA Clinic in Canton, Michigan, in his honor on May 5, 2023. At the dedication ceremony, Congresswoman Deborah A. Dingell (D-MI), representing the sixth district, highlighted the importance of the clinic and the commitment of the VA and her office to getting veterans the health care they need and deserve.

== Personal life ==
General Dillard was married to the former Helen Stephens of Margaret, Alabama. They had four children. General Dillard passed of natural causes on June 16, 2015, at the age of 88. He is buried in Arlington National Cemetery.
