= Charles S. Thomas (Virginia politician) =

American politician

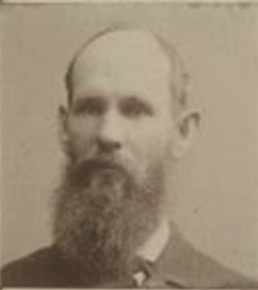

Member of the Virginia House of Delegates from Fluvanna County
- In office December 2, 1891 – December 6, 1893

Personal details
- Born: Charles Smith Thomas
- Died: April 5, 1894 Richmond, Virginia, U.S.
- Party: Democratic

Charles Smith Thomas (died April 5, 1894) was an American politician who served in the Virginia House of Delegates.
