= Charles Thomas (quartermaster) =

United States Army quartermaster (1797–1878)

- Born: April 13, 1797; Philadelphia, Pennsylvania, US
- Died: February 1, 1878 (aged 80); Washington, D.C., US
- Burial place: Congressional Cemetery, Washington, D.C.
- Military career
- Allegiance: United States; Union
- Branch: United States Army; Union Army
- Service years: 1819–1866
- Rank: Colonel; Brevet Major General
- Commands: Quartermaster, Center Division; Acting Quartermaster General of the U.S. Army
- Conflicts: Mexican-American War; American Civil War

Charles Thomas (April 13, 1797 – February 1, 1878) was a United States Army officer. The quartermaster served in the army for some 47 years, notably as Acting Quartermaster General of the U.S. Army during the American Civil War.

== Biography ==
Charles Thomas was born in Philadelphia on April 13, 1797. In 1819 he was commissioned as a third lieutenant in the United States Army Ordnance Department. He switched branches several times, briefly serving in the artillery before joining the 7th U.S. Infantry Regiment in 1822. In 1826 he became the unit's assistant quartermaster. He continued to serve in the regiment until 1838 when he was promoted to major in the Quartermaster Department. He participated in the Mexican-American War as quartermaster of the Center Division under command of Brigadier General John E. Wool. For his services in the war he was brevetted lieutenant colonel. The substantial promotion followed in 1850, and he was finally promoted to colonel and assistant quartermaster-general in 1856.

When the American Civil War began, Thomas headed the department's Inventory & Accounts Office from 1861 to 1863. Beside his administrative post, he also commanded the Philadelphia Quartermaster Depot, went to England as a purchasing agent from October 1861 to May 1862 and served as assistant quartermaster-general with the Middle Department for a year. When Quartermaster-General Montgomery C. Meigs began his inspection tours in the field in August 1863, while officially retaining his position, Thomas was chosen to serve as acting quartermaster-general in his stead. He served as such back in Washington D.C. until January 1864. A year later President Abraham Lincoln nominated him to be brevetted brigadier general for his services in the current war, which was approved backdated to July 5, 1864. Another year later he received the brevet to major general, dated March 13, 1865. In the meantime, Thomas continued in his quartermaster duties until he retired in July 1866.

Thomas stayed in Washington, D.C., where he died at his residence on February 1, 1878. His funeral was four days later, his pallbearers being Generals Meigs, Samuel P. Heintzelman, David Hunter, Edward D. Townsend, George C. Thomas, Pelouze, MacFeely and Colonel Montgomery. He was buried on the Congressional Cemetery.

His son Charles William Thomas (1833–1882) was a quartermaster in the U.S. Army as well, graduating from the United States Military Academy in 1855. During the civil war he served as chief quartermaster of various corps and departments. He reached the rank of lieutenant colonel and eventually resigned in 1872, afterwards becoming a clerk in the Department of the Interior.

== See also ==
- List of American Civil War brevet generals (Union)
- List of American Civil War generals (Union)
