= Charles W. Thomas (general) =

Retired officer of the United States Army

Charles William Thomas
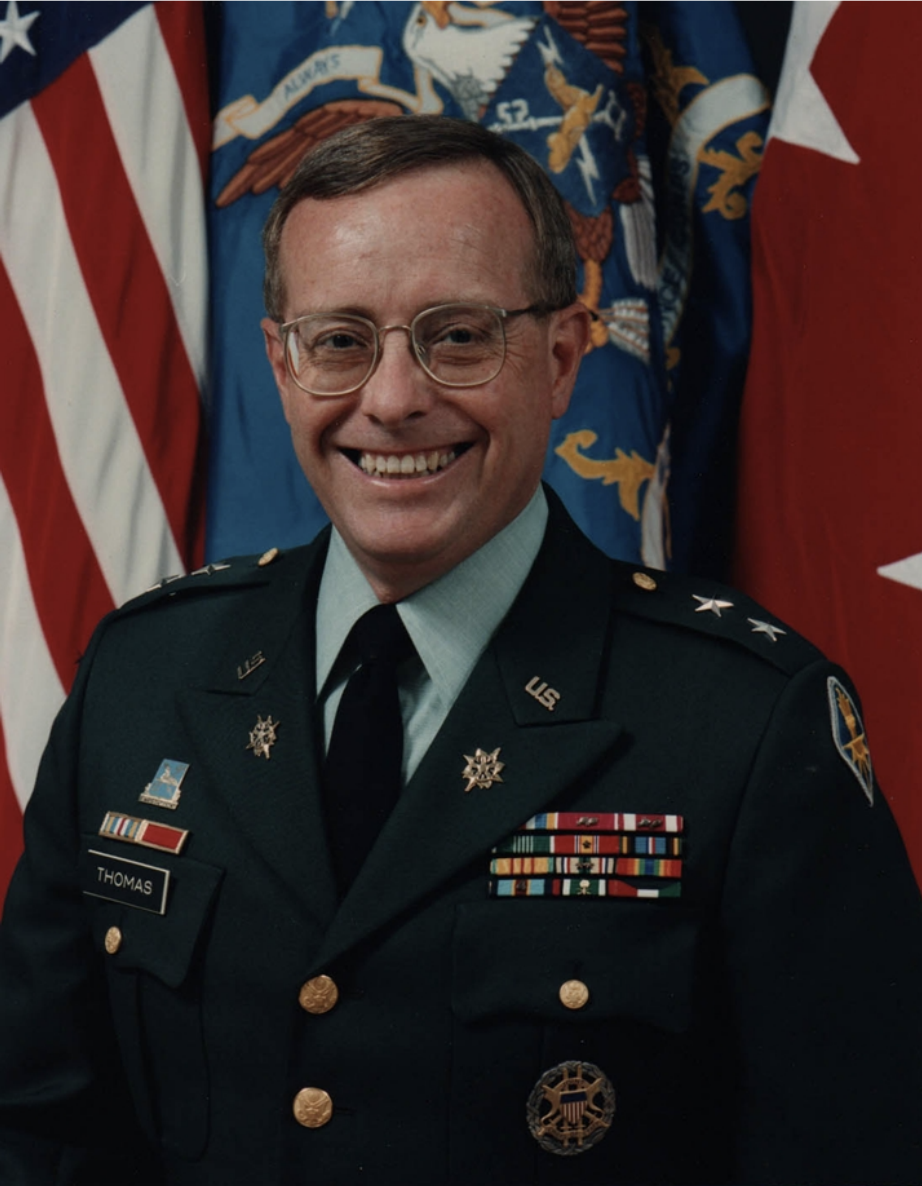
- Major General Charles W. Thomas
- Born: May 18, 1944 (age 82); Norfolk, Virginia
- Education: Northwestern State University
- Military career
- Allegiance: United States
- Branch: United States Army
- Service years: 1969–2000
- Rank: Major General
- Nickname: Chuck
- Units: 25th Infantry Division (1969–1974); 124th Military Intelligence Battalion (1974–1982); 24th Infantry Division (Mechanized) (1974–1982, 1983–1984)
- Commands: 302nd Military Intelligence Battalion (1985–1987); Military Intelligence Corps (1987); U.S. Army Field Station, Sinop, Turkey (1989); United States Central Command Joint Intelligence Center (1991); Current Operations Division, Special Technical Operations Division (1991); United States Army Europe and Seventh Army (1993–1994); United States Army Intelligence Center, Ft. Huachuca (1993–1994); U.S. Army Training and Doctrine Command, Fort Monroe (1998–2000)
- Wars: Gulf War: Operation Desert Storm
- Awards: Distinguished Service Medal; Defense Superior Service Medal; Legion of Merit; Meritorious Service Medal; Commendation Medal
- Memorials: Military Intelligence Hall of Fame (2001)
- Other work: Coleman Research (2000-2002); MEVATEC (2002-2011); Academi (2011-2013); Leonie Group (2013-2016

Major General (Ret) Charles William "Chuck" Thomas (born May 18, 1944) is a retired officer of the United States Army and defense industry executive.

== Early military service ==
Thomas was born in Norfolk, Virginia and raised in Natchitoches, Louisiana. A graduate of Northwestern State University, receiving a bachelor's degree and master's degree in zoology, Thomas entered the army in October 1968. Commissioned from Engineer Officer Candidate School on August 23, 1969, as a second lieutenant in the Military Intelligence Branch, he served consecutive junior officer and command and staff tours with the 25th Infantry Division and the U.S. Army Security Agency in Southeast Asia and Hawaii. After completing the Military Intelligence Officer advanced course in 1974, then Captain Thomas served as aide-de-camp to the commanding general of the U.S. Army Security Agency in Arlington, Virginia, followed by duty in the Army's Military Personnel Center as a military intelligence officer career manager.

== Military career ==
Upon promotion in 1979, Major Thomas served consecutively, as an infantry brigade intelligence officer (S-2), 124th Military Intelligence Battalion operations officer and executive officer in the 24th Infantry Division (Mechanized), Ft. Stewart, Georgia; subsequently attending the Army's Command and General Staff College at Ft. Leavenworth, Kansas, in 1982–1983. Returning to Ft. Stewart and the 24th Infantry Division in 1983, he served as the division intelligence officer (G-2) for 16 months. Selected for battalion command, then Lieutenant Colonel Thomas assumed command of the 302nd Military Intelligence Battalion in Frankfurt, Germany, in January 1985. In March 1987, he assumed duties at the Army's Personnel Center in Alexandria, Virginia, as chief of the Military Intelligence Branch. In 1988–1989 he attended the National War College in Washington D.C., and upon graduation, went immediately to Military Intelligence Brigade Command in Turkey, where he commanded the U.S. Army Field Station, Sinop, Turkey. After his command tour, Colonel Thomas was assigned to the Joint Staff in the Pentagon, where he began duty in the Joint Staff Operations (J-3) as the deputy for intelligence in the Special Technical Operations Division of the Current Operations Division (J-33). Prior to the Gulf War, Thomas was ordered to Riyadh, Saudi Arabia, and was appointed director of the Central Command Joint Intelligence Center, where he served for the duration of Operation Desert Storm. In April 1991, he returned to his duties on the Joint Staff in the Pentagon.

In October 1991, Thomas was selected for brigadier general and assigned as vice director for current intelligence, Joint Staff and Command Support, J-2/Defense Intelligence Agency. In June 1993, he was reassigned as deputy chief of staff of intelligence, Headquarters, United States Army Europe and Seventh Army in Heidelberg, Germany. On November 10, 1994, he assumed command of the United States Army Intelligence Center and Ft. Huachuca and was selected for major general in July 1995. Thomas's final assignment was as the chief of staff of the U.S. Army Training and Doctrine Command, Fort Monroe, Virginia from June 23, 1998 until his retirement, September 30, 2000.

== Retirement ==
Upon retirement from active duty, Thomas served as the Vice President of Defense and Intelligence Programs at Coleman Research in Washington, D.C. Thomas joined MEVATEC Corporation in January 2002 as their Vice President of Washington Operations. After MEVATEC’s acquisition by BAE Systems in April 2003, he transferred to Huntsville as the BAE Systems Analytical Solutions Vice President for Huntsville Operations. In July 2004 he assumed duties as Vice President and General Manager of BAE Systems Analytical & Ordnance Solutions in Rockville, MD. A subsequent reorganization in the BAE Systems Customer Solutions Operating Group combined several lines of business into Systems Engineering Solutions, and Thomas’ responsibilities expanded in scope for Army & Joint Operations.

Thomas joined Academi on September 6, 2011 as the Chief Operating Officer (COO) and was based at the company's new headquarters office in Arlington, VA. In April, 2013 he moved to Leonie Group as President/CEO and retired in June 2016. Subsequently he has maintained positions in an advisory capacity and on the corporate board of two defense industry companies.

MG Thomas’ active duty awards and decorations include the Distinguished Service Medal with oak leaf cluster, Defense Superior Service Medal, the Legion of Merit with oak leaf cluster, the Meritorious Service Medal with four oak leaf clusters, and the Army Commendation Medal. MG Thomas was inducted into the Military Intelligence Hall of Fame in 2001.
