= U.S. Army Intelligence Agency =

The United States Army Intelligence Agency was a military intelligence unit with the U.S. Department of the Army created in 1967. In 1977, it was replaced by the United States Army Intelligence and Security Command.
