= Japanese-American service in World War II =

Nisei serving in the United States military

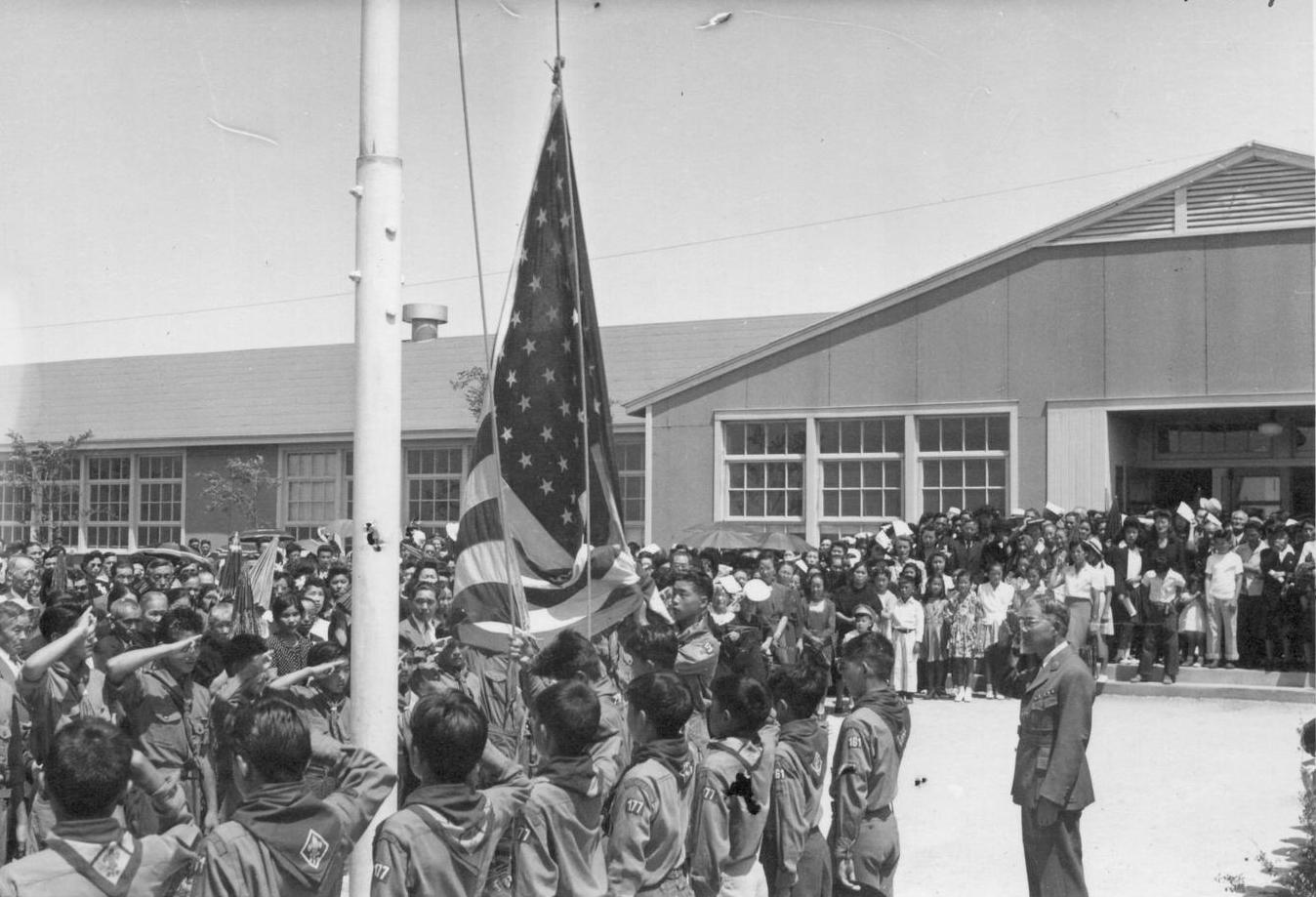
Boy Scouts at the Granada War Relocation Center raise the flag to half-staff during a Memorial Service for the first six Nisei soldiers from this Center who were killed in action in Italy. The service was attended by 1,500 Amache internees on August 5, 1944.

U.S. government-produced film defending the massive internment of Japanese Americans in detention camps during World War II. (Media from the Prelinger Archives)

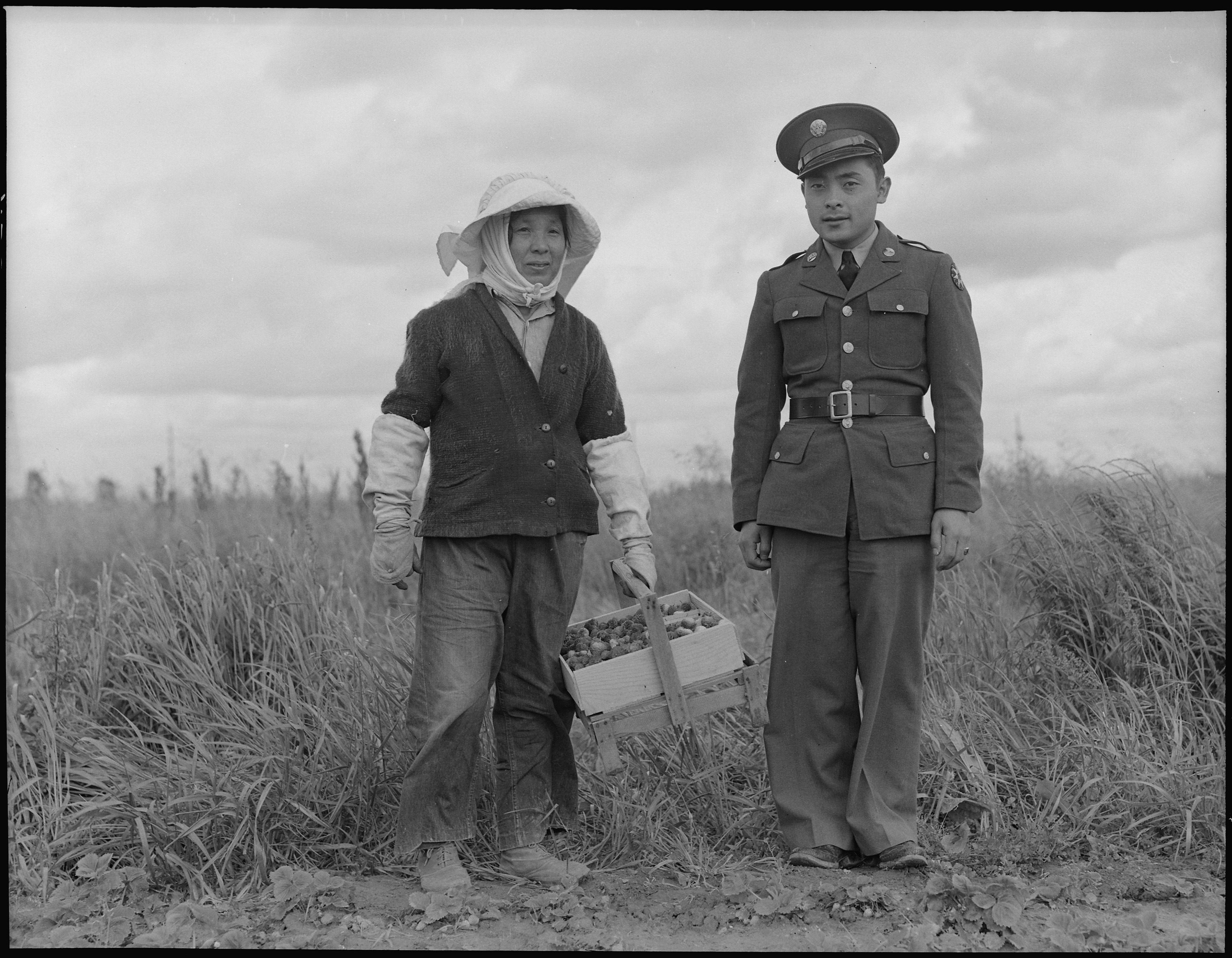
A U.S. soldier and his mother in Florin, Sacramento County, California

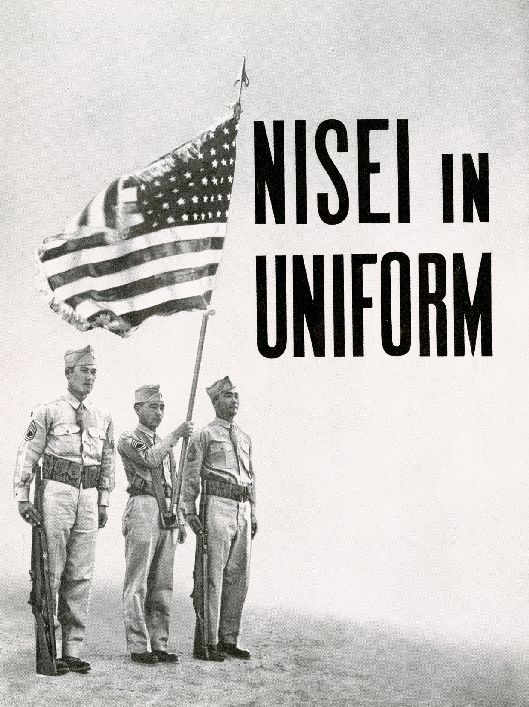
U.S. Army promotional pamphlet

During the early years of World War II, Japanese Americans were forcibly relocated from their homes on the West Coast because military leaders and public opinion combined to fan unproven fears of sabotage. As the war progressed, many of the young Nisei, Japanese immigrants' children who were born with American citizenship, volunteered or were drafted to serve in the United States military. Japanese Americans served in all the branches of the United States Armed Forces, including the United States Merchant Marine. An estimated 33,000 Japanese Americans served in the U.S. military during World War II, of which 20,000 joined the Army. Approximately 800 were killed in action.

The 100th Battalion and the 442nd Infantry Regiment became the most decorated unit in U.S. military history. The related 522nd Field Artillery Battalion liberated one or more subcamps of the infamous Dachau concentration camp. Other Japanese-American units also included the 100th Infantry Battalion, the 1399th Engineer Construction Battalion, and the Military Intelligence Service.

== Servicemen in the U.S. Army ==
The majority of Japanese Americans serving in the American Armed Forces during World War II enlisted in the army.

=== 100th Infantry Battalion ===
The 100th Infantry Battalion was engaged in heavy action during the war taking part in multiple campaigns. The 100th was made up of Nisei who were originally members of the Hawaii National Guard. Sent to the mainland as the Hawaii Provisional Infantry Battalion on June 5, 1942, the 1,432 original members of the 100th were stationed first at Camp McCoy and later at Camp Shelby for combat training. Their exemplary military record, and the patriotic activities of the Varsity Victory Volunteers, paved the way for the creation of the 442nd Regimental Combat Team in January 1943. The Battalion shipped out in August 1943, landing in North Africa before fighting in Italy, eventually participating in the liberation of Rome.

=== 442nd Regimental Combat Team ===
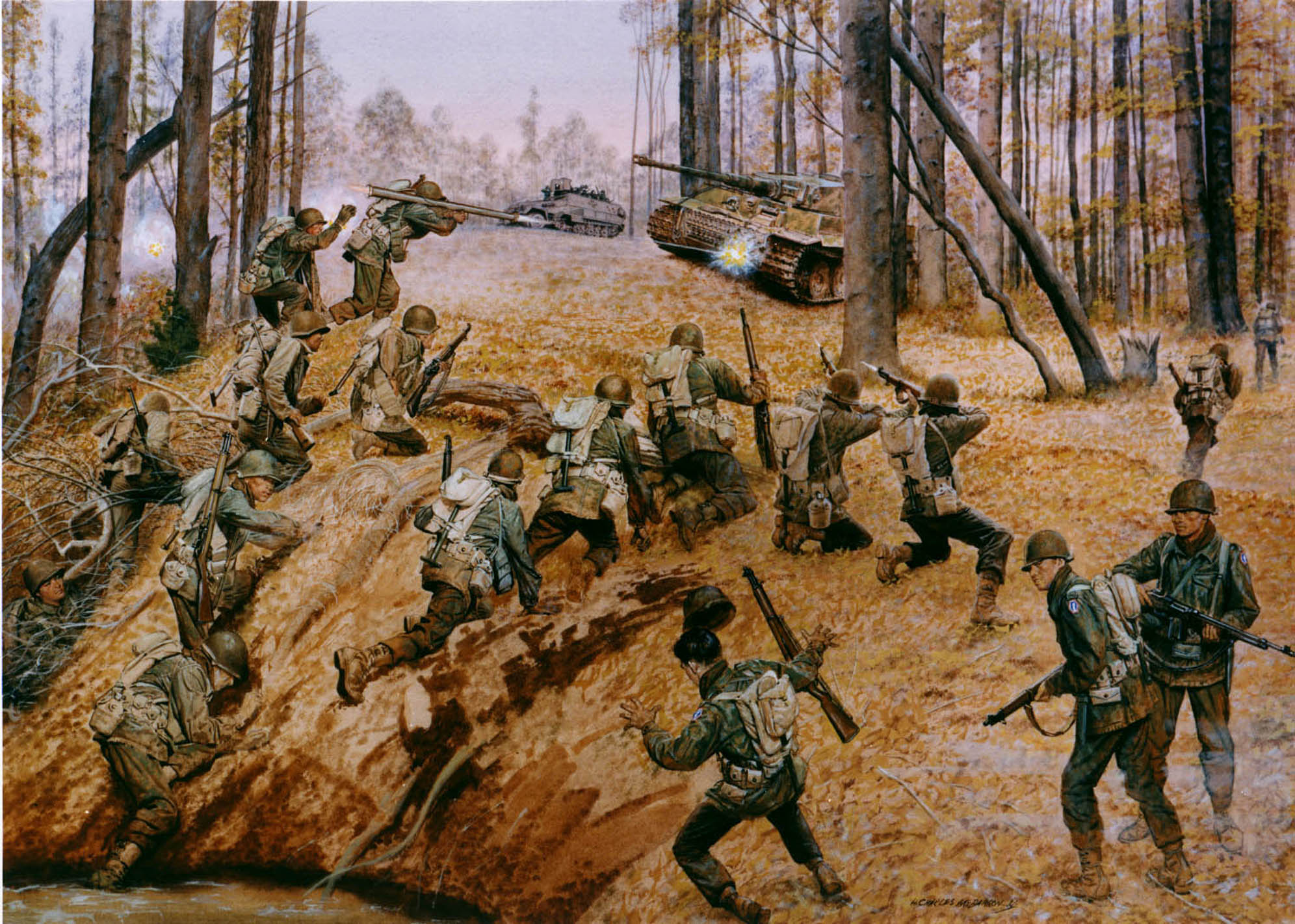
Painting depicting soldiers of the 442nd Regimental Combat Team fighting in the Vosges

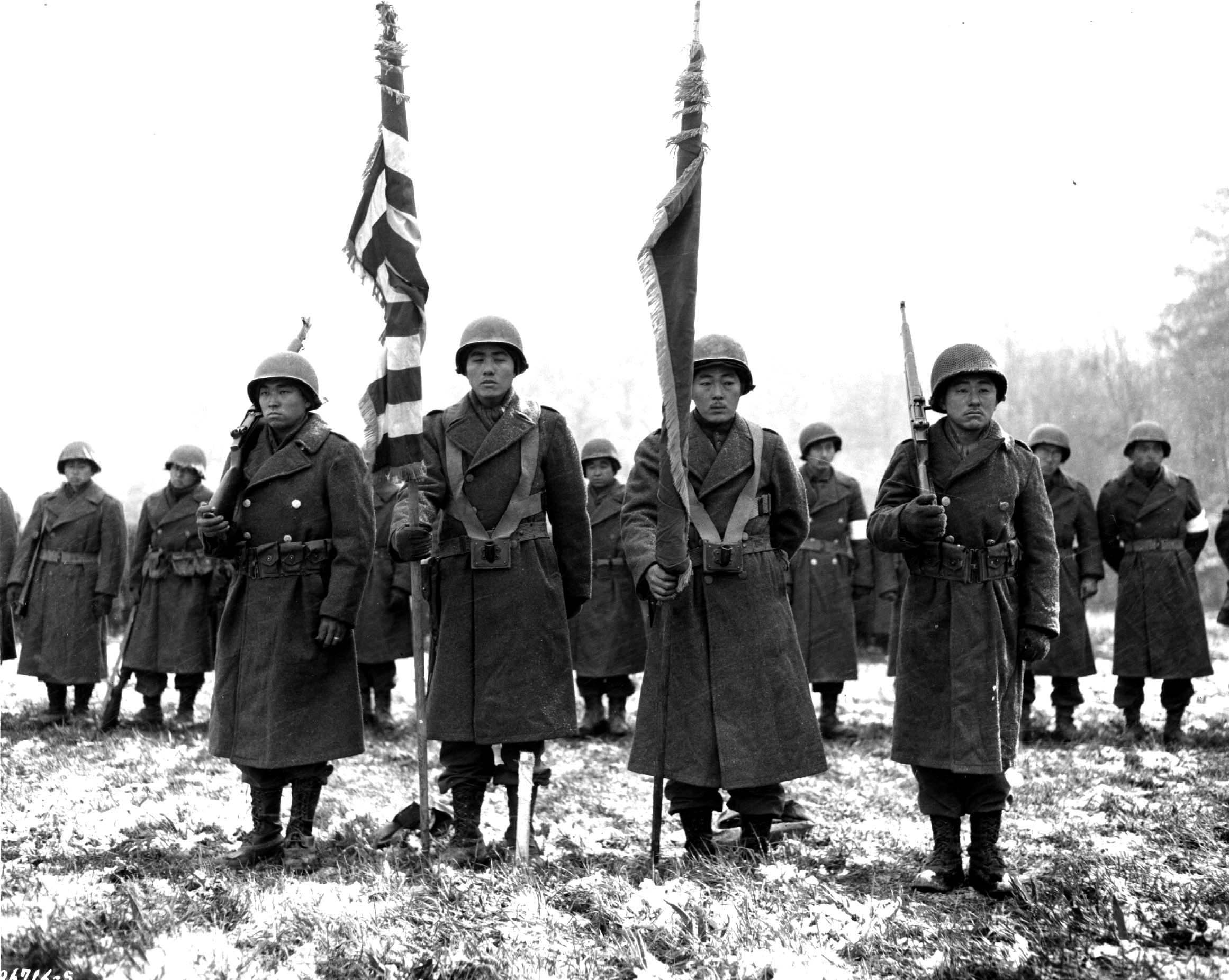
Two color guards and color bearers of the Japanese-American 442nd Combat Team stand at attention while their citations are read. They are standing on ground of Bruyeres, France, where many of their comrades fell.

Meanwhile, an earlier decision to demote Nisei soldiers to 4-C class (enemy aliens ineligible for military service because of nationality) was reversed, and the Army in January 1943 issued a call for Japanese-American volunteers. Most of the initial recruits came from Hawaii, as those on the mainland were reluctant to volunteer while they and their families remained in camp. The 2,686 accepted Hawaiians (out of 10,000 volunteers) and about 1,000 mainlanders were sent to Camp Shelby. The U.S. Army regiment served in Europe during World War II. Japanese Americans already in training at the start of the war had been removed from active duty shortly after Pearl Harbor, and the Army stopped accepting new Nisei recruits in early 1942. However, community leaders in Hawaii as well as Japanese-American leaders like Mike Masaoka along with War Department officials like John J. McCloy soon began to push the Roosevelt administration to allow Nisei to serve in combat. A military board was convened in June 1942 to address the issue, but their final report opposed forming a Nisei unit, citing "the universal distrust in which they [Japanese Americans] are held." Despite resistance from military and War Relocation Authority leaders, the President eventually sided with the War Department, and on February 1, 1943, Roosevelt announced the creation of a segregated unit composed of Nisei soldiers and commanded by white officers. The 100th Infantry Battalion composed of men from Hawaii entered combat in Italy in September 1943 and suffered horrific casualties and became known as the Purple Heart Battalion. As a result, the 1st Battalion of the 442nd began sending replacement troops to join the 100th in early 1944. The 2nd and 3rd Battalions shipped out on May 1, 1944, joining the 100th in Italy in June 1944. These men arrived in Europe after the 100th Infantry Battalion had already established its reputation as a fighting unit, and in time, the 100th/442nd became, for its size and length of service, the most decorated unit in U.S. military history.

=== 522nd Field Artillery Battalion ===
The Nisei 522nd Field Artillery Battalion was organized as part of the 442nd Regimental Combat Team; but towards the end of the war, the 522nd became a roving battalion, shifting to whatever command most needed the unit. The 522nd had the distinction of liberating survivors of the Dachau concentration camp system from the Nazis on April 29, 1945. Nisei scouts west of Munich near the small Bavarian town of Lager Lechfeld encountered some barracks encircled by barbed wire. Technician Fourth Grade Ichiro Imamura described it in his diary:

"I watched as one of the scouts used his carbine to shoot off the chain that held the prison gates shut .... They weren’t dead, as he had first thought. When the gates swung open, we got our first good look at the prisoners. Many of them were Jews. They were wearing striped prison suits and round caps. It was cold and the snow was two feet deep in some places. There were no German guards. The prisoners struggled to their feet .... They shuffled weakly out of the compound. They were like skeletons – all skin and bones ...."

Holocaust historians have clarified the Nisei 522nd liberated about 3,000 prisoners at Kaufering IV in Hurlach. Hurlach was one of 169 subordinate slave labor camps of Dachau. Dachau, like Auschwitz, Buchenwald, Mauthausen and Ravensbrück, was surrounded by hundreds of sub-camps. Only three days later, the survivors of a death march southwards from Dachau towards the Austrian border were found by troops of the 522nd just west of the village of Waakirchen, and cared for them until dedicated medical personnel took over.

Pierre Moulin in his recent book 'Dachau, Holocaust and US Samurais' writes that the first Nisei arrived at Dachau's gate not on April 29, the date of the liberation of the camp, but on April 28, 1945. Two jeeps of forward observers with 522nd Field Artillery Battalion Captain Charles Feibleman, Kelly Nakamura (Driver), George Oide, Kenzo Okubo, Mike Hara, arrived first at the gates of Dachau but were told to wait for back up since the SS were still in the towers.

=== Military Intelligence Service ===
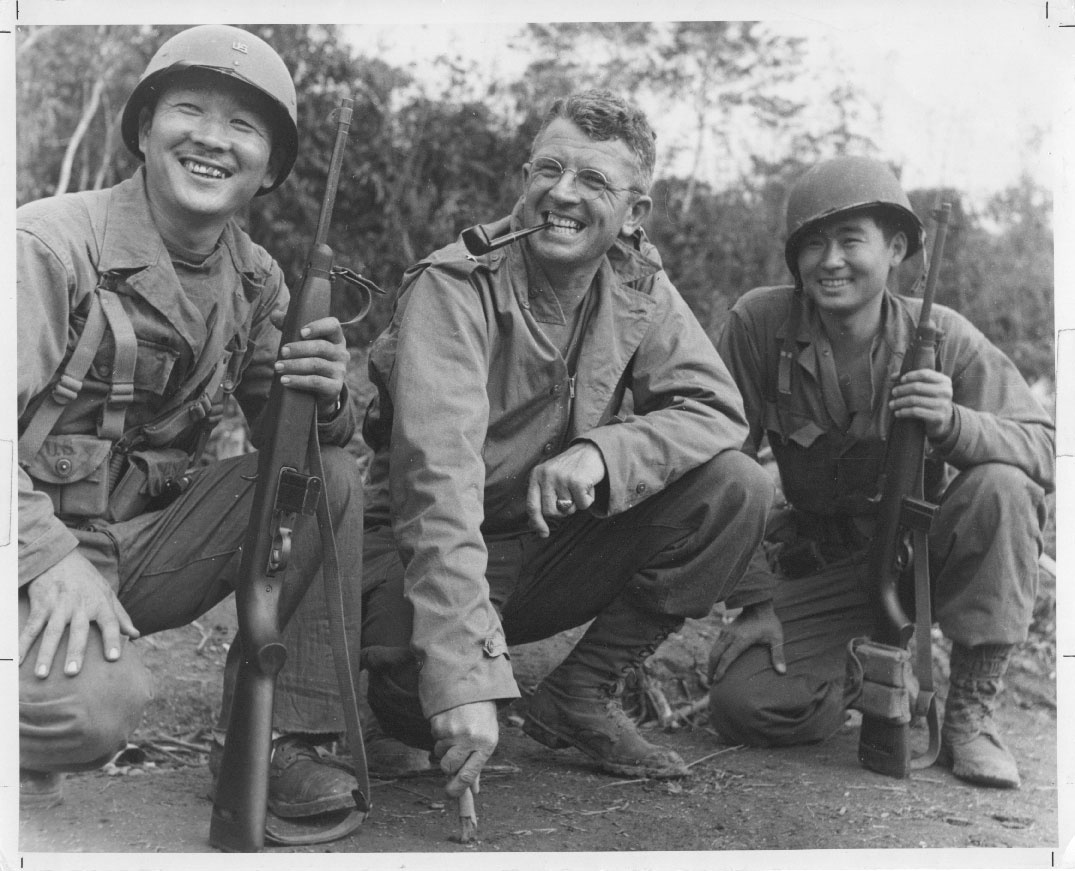
Brig. Gen. Frank Merrill, Commander of "Merrill's Marauders," poses between T/Sgt. Herbert Miyasaki and T/Sgt. Akiji Yoshimura. Burma. May 1, 1944.

Approximately 6,000 Japanese Americans served in the Military Intelligence Service (MIS). The first class received their training at the Presidio in San Francisco, but in June 1942 the MIS Language School was moved to Camp Savage, Minnesota, which offered larger facilities, removed the complications of training Japanese-American students in an area they were technically prohibited from entering, and had less anti-Japanese prejudice. In August 1944, the language school was moved again to Fort Snelling.

Most of the MIS Language School graduates were attached to the Allied Translator and Interpreter Section (ATIS) as linguists and in other non-combatant roles, interpreting captured enemy documents and interrogating prisoners of war. Graduates from the MISLS included Japanese-American women translators as well. (At the end of the war, MIS linguists had translated 18,000 enemy documents, created 16,000 propaganda leaflets and interrogated over 10,000 Japanese POWs.) However, MIS servicemen were present at every major battle against Japanese forces, and those who served in combat faced extremely dangerous and difficult conditions, sometimes coming under friendly fire from U.S. soldiers unable to distinguish them from the Japanese and often encountering former friends on the battlefield.

Japanese-American MIS linguists translated Japanese documents known as the "Z Plan", which contained Japan's counterattack strategy in the Central Pacific. This information led to Allied victories at the Battle of the Philippine Sea, in which the Japanese lost most of their aircraft carrier planes, and the Battle of Leyte Gulf. An MIS radio operator intercepted a message describing Admiral Isoroku Yamamoto's flight plans, which led to P-38 Lightning fighter planes shooting down his plane over the Solomon Islands.

When Merrill's Marauders were organized to conduct long range penetration special operations jungle warfare deep behind Japanese lines in the China-Burma-India Theater in January 1944, fourteen MIS linguists were assigned to the unit, including Army Rangers and Military Intelligence Hall of Fame inductee Roy Matsumoto.

The Nisei under Merrill's command proved themselves particularly intrepid and helpful, venturing into the enemy lines and translating audible commands to counterattacks, and shouting conflicting commands to the Japanese, throwing them into confusion. They soon became the best known Nisei in the war against Japan. The War Relocation Authority used their story to impress other Americans with Nisei valor and loyalty, even placing stories in local newspapers as the war waned in 1945 and the WRA prepared to release the Japanese-Americans back into their communities.

Over 5,000 Japanese Americans served in the occupation of Japan. Dozens of MIS graduates served as translators, interpreters, and investigators in the International Military Tribunal for the Far East. Thomas Sakamoto served as press escort during the occupation of Japan. He escorted American correspondents to Hiroshima, and the USS Missouri in Tokyo Bay. Sakamoto was one of three Japanese Americans to be on board the USS Missouri when the Japanese formally surrendered. Arthur S. Komori served as personal interpreter for Brig. Gen. Elliot R. Thorpe. Kay Kitagawa served as personal interpreter of Fleet Admiral William Halsey Jr. Kan Tagami served as personal interpreter-aide for General Douglas MacArthur. Journalist Don Caswell was accompanied by a Nisei interpreter to Fuchū Prison, where the Japanese government imprisoned communists Tokuda Kyuichi, Yoshio Shiga, and Shiro Mitamura.

== Servicemen in the Army Air Forces ==
Japanese Americans were generally forbidden to fight a combat role in the Pacific theatre; although no such limitations were placed on Americans of German or Italian ancestry who fought against the Axis powers. Up to this point, the United States government has only been able to find records of five Japanese Americans who were members of the Army Air Forces during World War II, one of them being Kenje Ogata. There was at least one Nisei, U.S. Army Air Forces Technical Sergeant Ben Kuroki, who participated initially in 35 missions as a dorsal turret gunner over Europe, followed by 28 bombing missions over mainland Japan and other locations in the Pacific Theater.

Nisei Herbert Seijin Ginoza flew combat missions over Europe as a waist-tail gunner in the 483rd Bomb Group. He spent 3 months as a German prisoner-of-war after his B17 was shot down on a bombing mission near Vienna, Austria.

== Women's Army Corps ==
Like their male counterparts, Nisei women were at first prohibited from serving in the U.S. military; this changed in November 1943, and 142 young women volunteered to join the WAC. Because their number was relatively small, the Nisei WACs were not restricted to a segregated corps, but instead were spread out and served alongside other ethnic groups. The idea of female auxiliary service was still new at this time (the Women's Army Corps was only nine months old when it opened its ranks to Nisei volunteers), and these women were most often assigned to clerical duties or other "women's work." Additionally, WACs were often portrayed in media and propaganda as highly sexualized and were encouraged by male supervisors to play into this role. The Nisei WACs faced another difficulty in that they were expected to translate Japanese military documents; even those who were fluent in Japanese struggled to understand the military language, and eventually some were sent to the Military Intelligence Language School for training.

== After the war ==
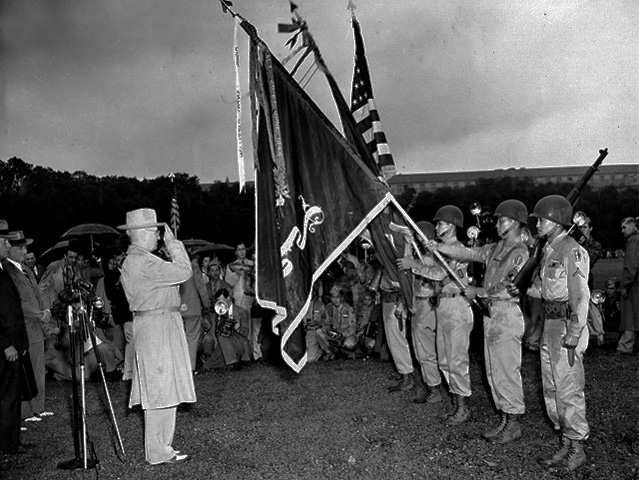
President Truman salutes the colors of the 442nd during the presentation of their seventh Presidential Unit Citation.

The 442nd marched down Constitution Avenue to the Ellipse south of the White House on July 15, 1946, where President Truman honored the regiment with a Presidential Unit Citation saying, "You fought not only the enemy, but you fought prejudice--and you have won." However, the unit's service and decorations still did not change the attitudes of the general population in much of the U.S. towards people of Japanese ancestry. Veterans came home to signs that read "No Japs Allowed" and "No Japs Wanted", the denial of service in shops and restaurants, and the vandalism of their homes and property.

Initially, many veterans' organizations such as the VFW and the American Legion refused to allow Nisei veterans into existing posts and some even removed Japanese-American soldiers from their honor rolls. White officers from the 442nd including Col Virgil R. Miller advocated on the behalf of the Nisei in Chicago to be allowed to form their own American Legion post 1183 in 1946, while Alva Fleming, a Navy veteran in Sacramento district leadership approved the charter for Nisei VFW Post 8985 in 1947. Fleming would go on to become the VFW State Commander for California and was instrumental in founding a total of 14 segregated Nisei VFW posts in the state. Veterans in the Pacific Northwest were unable to find any post willing to accept them, and eventually formed their own independent "Nisei Veterans Committee". Although VFW National leadership condemned the actions of local posts, their bylaws promoted autonomy in individual posts and were powerless to prevent the discrimination. Smaller organizations such as American Veterans Committee and Military Order of the Purple Heart invited Nisei into their ranks, however they did not offer the same facilities and benefits as the larger organizations.

== Recognition ==
Some of the first memorials to the Nisei were created by 442nd and MIS veterans themselves, in the creation of the many Nisei American Legion, VFW, and independent memorial posts around the country, dedicated to their fallen brothers in arms.

The nation's highest award for combat valor, the Medal of Honor, was conferred upon one Nisei during the war, Sadao Munemori, after he sacrificed his life to save his fellow soldiers. Nineteen members of the 100th Infantry Battalion and the 442nd Regimental Combat Team received Distinguished Service Crosses during or immediately after their World War II service, but in the 1990s, after a study revealed that racial discrimination had caused them to be overlooked, their awards were upgraded to Medals of Honor. In addition, one soldier who had received the Silver Star had his award upgraded to the Medal of Honor.

On October 5, 2010, Congress approved the granting of the Congressional Gold Medal to the 442nd Regimental Combat Team and the 100th Infantry Battalion, as well as the 6,000 Japanese Americans who served in the Military Intelligence Service during the war. The Nisei Soldiers of World War II Congressional Gold Medal was collectively presented on November 2, 2011.

The Japanese American Memorial to Patriotism During World War II in Washington, D.C. is a National Park Service site to commemorate the experience of American citizens of Japanese ancestry and their parents who patriotically supported the United States despite unjust treatment during World War II.

The Go for Broke Monument in Little Tokyo, Los Angeles, California, commemorates the Japanese Americans who served in the United States Army during World War II.

The National Japanese American Veterans Memorial Court in Los Angeles lists the names of all the Japanese Americans killed in service to the country in World War II as well as in Korea, Vietnam, Iraq, and Afghanistan.

California has given four state highway segments honorary designations for Japanese American soldiers:

- State Route 23 between U.S. Route 101 and State Route 118 is named the Military Intelligence Memorial Freeway.
- State Route 99 between Fresno and Madera is named the 100th Infantry Battalion Memorial Highway;
- State Route 99 between Salida and Manteca is named the 442nd Regimental Combat Team Memorial Highway;
- The interchange between the I-105 and I-405 freeways in Los Angeles is labeled the Sadao S. Munemori Memorial Interchange.
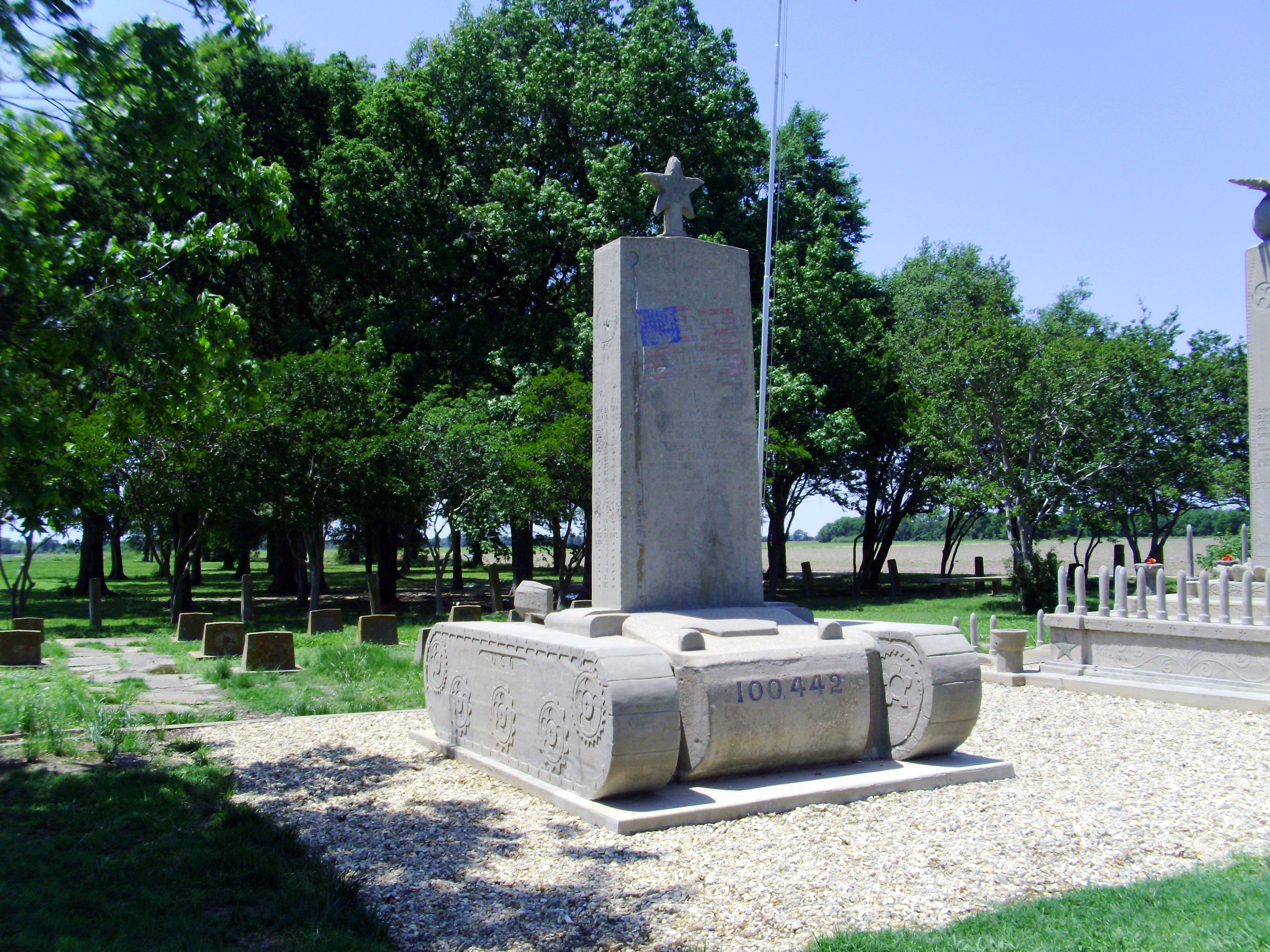
Monument to the men of the 100th Battalion, 442nd Regimental Combat Team, Rohwer Memorial Cemetery

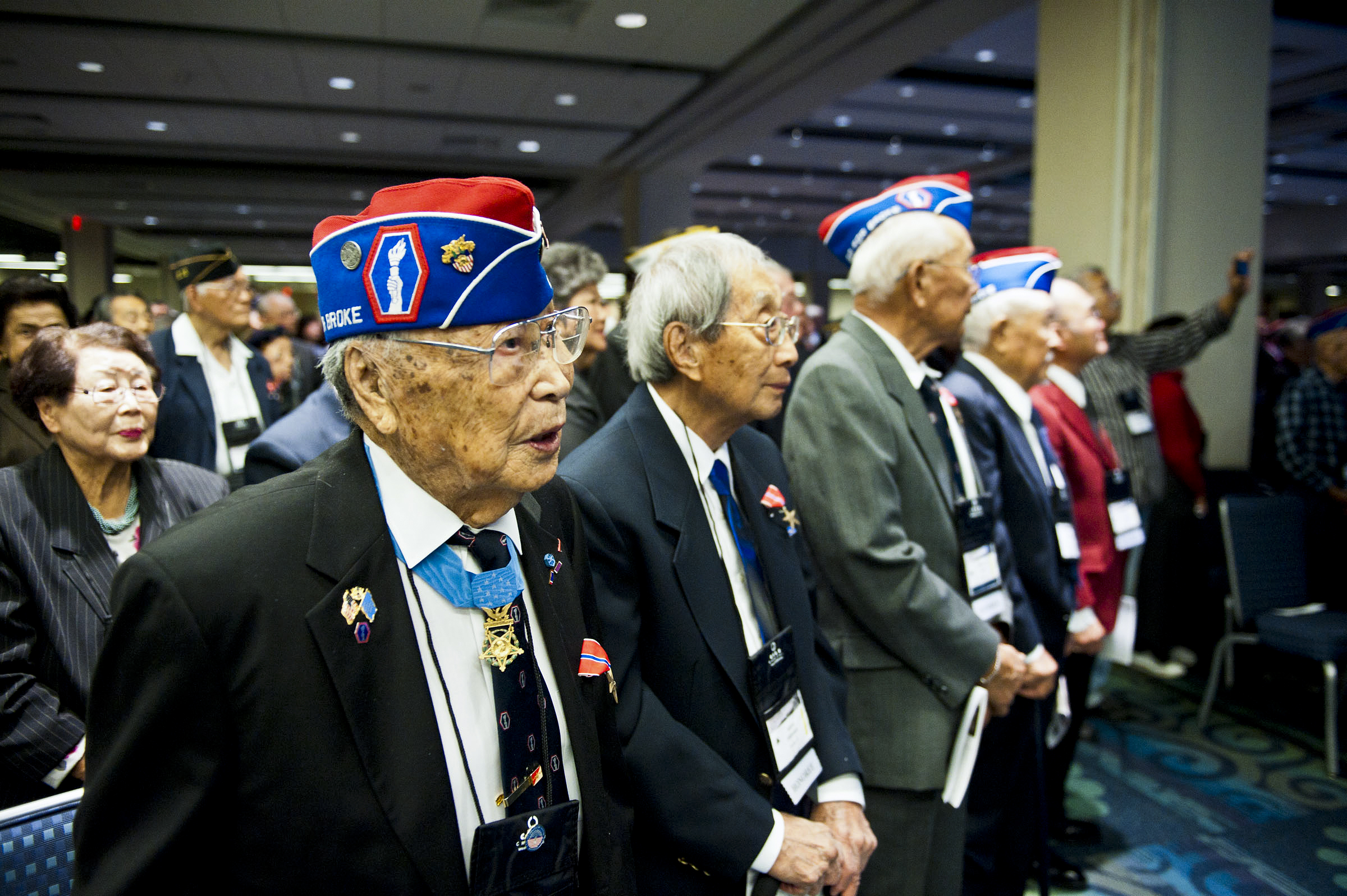
Veterans from the 442nd Regimental Combat Team attend the World War II Nisei Veterans Program National Veterans Network tribute.

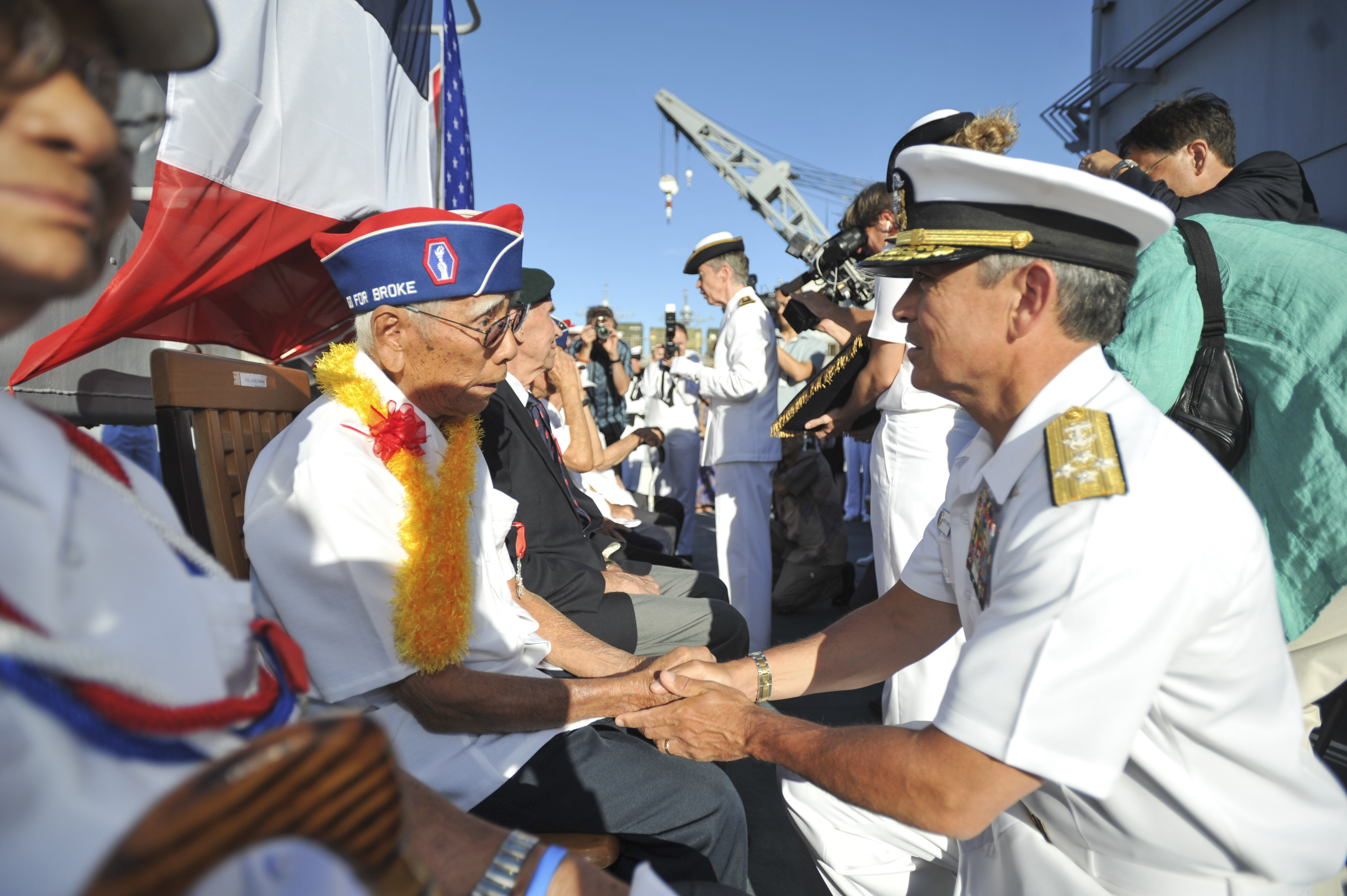
Pearl Harbor (2 July 2014). Adm. Harry Harris Jr., COMPACFLT, thanks Ralph Tomei, a 442nd veteran. Tomei represented his friend Shiro Aoki as French RADM Anne Cullere presents him with the Legion of Honor.

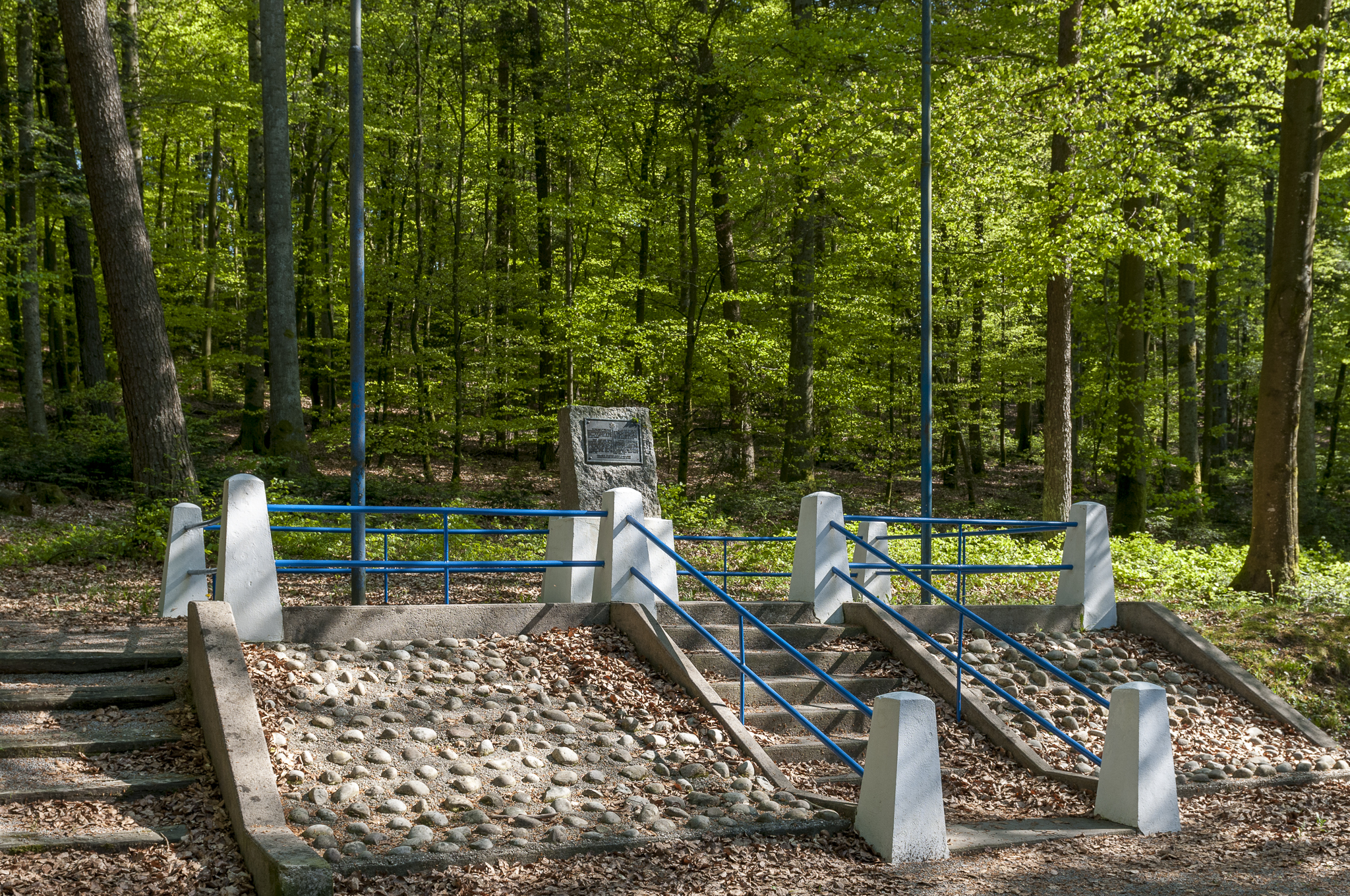
The American monument in Bruyères honoring the Japanese Americans serving in the 442nd

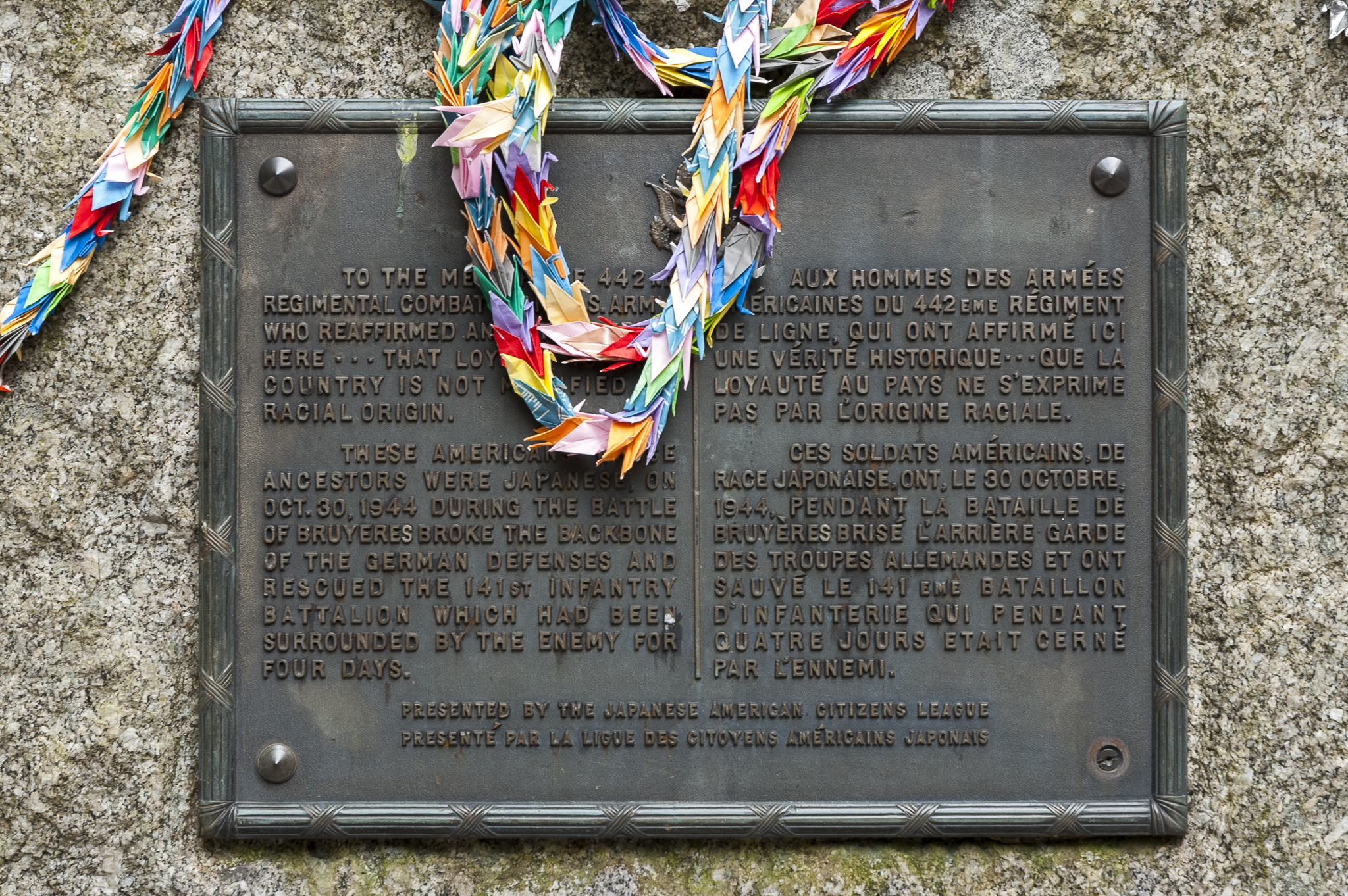
The American plaque commemorating the 442nd in both English and French in Bruyères, France

== See also ==
- List of Japanese American servicemen and servicewomen in World War II
- Lost Battalion (World War II)
- Go for Broke Monument
- Japanese American Memorial to Patriotism During World War II
- Day of Remembrance (Japanese Americans)
- Military history of Asian Americans
- Japanese-American life before World War II
- Japanese-American life after World War II
- Nisei women translators in World War II
