= Nisei women translators in World War II =

During World War II, some second generation Japanese-American women, who were known as Nisei women, joined the United States military as translators and linguists. The U.S. military recruited these women from both the public and from Japanese internment camps across the United States, especially from Hawaii. Given the prejudice against Japanese Americans at the start of the war, some government officials and American citizens were not ready for American Nisei women to contribute to the field due to traditional gender barriers and suspicion of espionage. Through their service as translators, they proved their loyalty to the United States and contributed to their efforts to win the war.

Nisei women translators were sometimes graduates of the Military Intelligence Service Language School (MISLS) and went on to translate and interpret documents in their assigned stations. Other times, Nisei women were recruited by the Women's Army Corps (WAC) or its predecessor, Women's Auxiliary Army Corps (WAAC), and trained to translate in units at the Pacific Military Intelligence Research Center (PACMIRS) or the Allied Translator and Interpreter Section (ATIS). They were then distributed to different stations, such as Fort Snelling and Camp Ritchie, to apply what they learned in real occupations. By the end of WWII, Nisei translators and linguists, both men and women, translated roughly 20.5 million pages of documents. Notable Nisei women translators include Haruko Sugi Hurt, Sue Suzuko Kato, and Miyako Yanamoto.

== Recruitment process ==
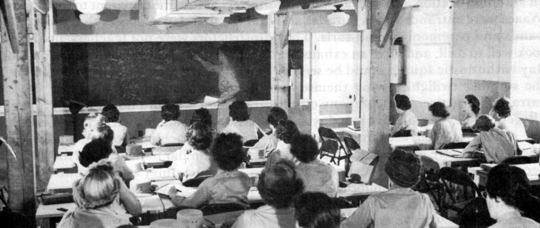
First Officer Candidate Class, WAAC Officer Training School in Fort Des Moines, Iowa teaching a class.

The recruitment of Nisei women as translators began in early 1943. One month prior, President Roosevelt approved the War Department's proposal to create a regiment of loyal American citizens of Japanese descent. These American-born Nisei men volunteered, and the government later drafted them to serve to protect the United States on the field as the 442nd Regimental Combat Team. After informing Secretary of War Stimson of this approval, Roosevelt drafted a memorandum to WAAC Director Oveta C. Hobby to recruit and train Nisei women in the process. Sergeant Kenneth Uni supported the induction of Nisei women, stating that some Nisei men would not join the military unless Nisei women were allowed in the field as stenographers, typists, teachers, trained nurses, social workers, and more. Even though others discouraged the idea of women joining the military, the War Department approved recruiting women linguists for the WAAC in January 1943, although there were still restrictions so that women officers could not command men.

In late January, the War Department created recruitment teams to find Nisei women who could work in cryptography and communications as linguists. Although these Japanese American women could work as translators and linguists, they were of noncombatant status, which meant they were not allowed to occupy positions as interrogators or interpreters in the combat zones on the field. Such teams comprised one member from the War Relocation Center, one military officer, two sergeants of the loyalty investigative branch of the combined service commands, and one American male soldier of Japanese ancestry. The WAC Director Hobby administered loyalty questionnaires and interviews. The purpose was to investigate and determine loyalty amongst these Japanese American women. Nevertheless, during the recruitment process, recruiters reported that many of the Nisei women had graduated college, worked as teachers or in business positions, and tested higher in their language skills exams, more qualified than many of their male counterparts. If allowed to train to be a translator for the U.S. government, there was also a question of whether or not they would want to enlist.

The motivation to join the WACs as translators, linguists, or clerical workers was multifaceted. Some Nisei women desired to serve in the military to help bring their brothers or husbands home as soon as possible. Serving their country meant a push to restore life as it was before the war. Others wanted to join to experience military life, thought to be an adventurous and promising experience. Through experiences in war, they also gain education and practical skills that they could apply after their service.

Before enlisting in war efforts, Nisei families often confronted their daughters or wives about joining the military. Some families disapproved of their enlistment, even as translators, because it challenged both Japanese and American traditional gender norms. Additionally, some women were required to serve abroad, which meant they had to leave their families behind in incarceration camps. Since the U.S. had already drafted many husbands and sons of Issei to serve in the military, many Nisei women were reluctant to leave their families alone in relocation centers or camps. According to the report of Second Officer Manice M. Hill, Nisei women at the Rohwer Relocation Center expressed extreme interest in serving in the Women's Army Auxiliary Corps. Still, regardless of their strong desire to serve, they held feelings of responsibility toward their parents. They closely tied their desire for recruitment into organizations such as the WACs, WAACs, and MISLS to their familial relationships.

== Service during World War II ==
=== Military Intelligence Service Language School (MISLS) ===
The Army first established the Military Intelligence Service Language School in San Francisco in 1941. Nisei women were recruited into the MISLS either directly or through the WACs. This language school taught them to serve as interpreters and translators. In 1943, the language school moved to Camp Savage, Minnesota, but moved again in August 1944 to Fort Snelling, Minnesota. In November 1944, the military assigned forty-eight Nisei women (eighteen Nisei from Hawaii and twenty-nine Nisei from the continental United States), three Caucasian women, and one Chinese-American woman to Fort Snelling's school.

While the Army assumed that the Nisei women could naturally speak and read Japanese, this was not always the case. Some had previous experience speaking Japanese with a language instructor or their parents, but their backgrounds and aptitudes differed. The Nisei women during the early years of the war were distributed amongst three levels of instruction and started training to become military translators. During their training, the first group of Nisei women linguists were sent to MISLS at Fort Snelling in November 1944. During the six-month course of study in document translation, they learned about Japan's history, geography, military structure, and political and cultural background. Many had classes from 9 AM to 4 PM and continued to study after hours. In their time off, these women could sightsee, attend concerts, visit museums, go fishing in the St. Paul-Minneapolis area, eat Japanese food, and travel freely in the East to visit family living in internment camps.

The women trained separately from the men and were vastly outnumbered by a ratio of more than fifty to one. While, the women's classes followed the same curriculum as the male students, the Japanese American women focused more on written translation than spoken language translation. On November 17, 1945, forty-one students graduated, and the director of personnel procurement, Major Paul Rusch, stated that the top ten graduates were "on par or a shade above par, in comparison with the Nisei male linguists." Three graduates remained as MISLS instructors.

The public did not know about Japanese American contributions to intelligence work until the early 1970s because the government sought to keep it secretive. Many Nisei translators' and linguists' efforts went unrecognized. In 2000, President George W. Bush gave the first recognition to MIS veterans, both Nisei men and women, in the Presidential Unit Citation award ceremony. Later, in 2010, MIS veterans received the Congressional Gold Medal alongside veterans of the 442nd Regimental Combat Team and the 100th Infantry Battalion.

=== Pacific Military Intelligence Research Section (PACMIRS) ===
In Camp Ritchie, Maryland, the top twenty-one Japanese American women translator graduates from the MISLS translated captured Japanese documents in the Pacific Military Intelligence Research Section. Their contributions to the translation of military, political, and economic documents assisted the United States in understanding Japan's war capabilities.

=== Allied Translator and Interpreter Section (ATIS) - Southwest Pacific Area ===
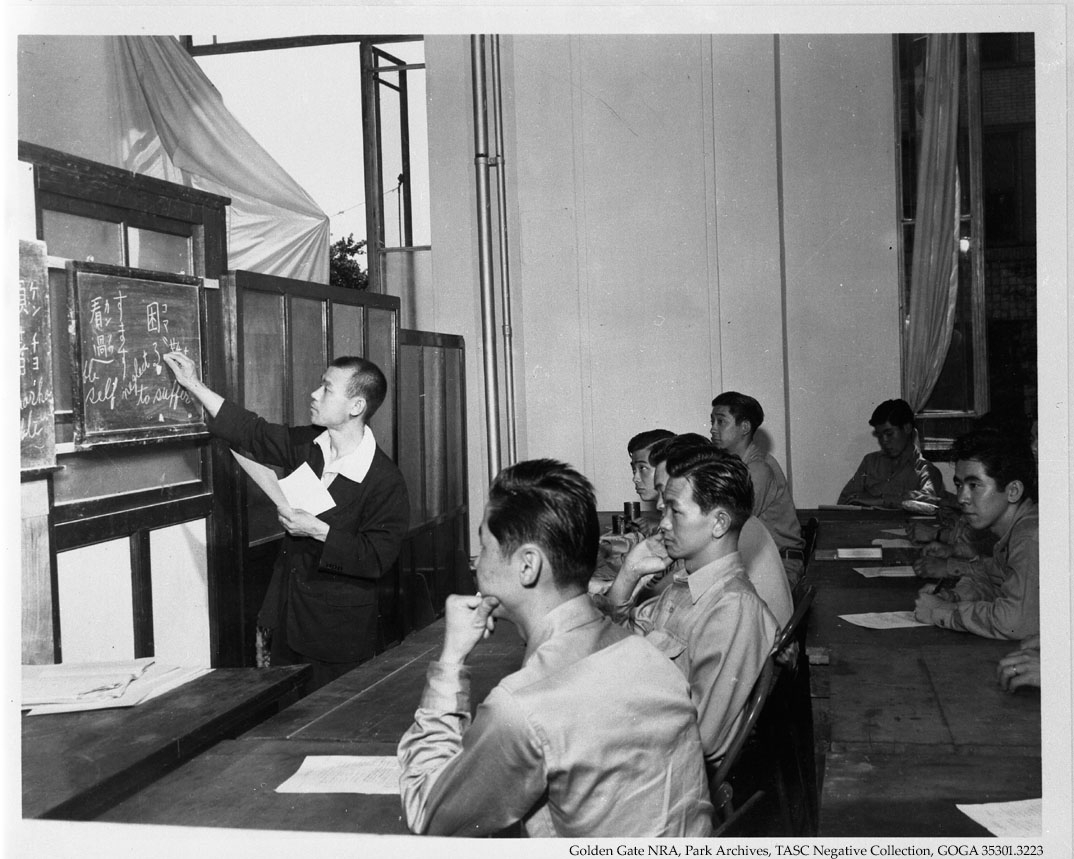
ATIS Nisei soldier interpreters in Tokyo, Japan

The military relocated some Nisei women who went on to serve as translators in the war effort to the Allied Translator and Interpreter Section (ATIS) in the Southwest Pacific Area. Col. Sidney F. Mashbir built it at the Indooroopilly Racetrack on the outskirts of Brisbane, located on Australia's northeast coast. He firmly believed that Japanese Americans were significant in the war effort in response to “war hysteria” against Nisei. He constantly reminded them, "you are volunteers, [and] that you are doing a brave, courageous, and patriotic thing in volunteering for this service.”

By the war's end, ATIS translated and published roughly 20.5 million pages of Japanese intelligence documents. Although the Japanese were meticulous in keeping their records secure, they were only confident because they believed the language barrier afforded them the most security. ATIS used this to their advantage by collecting war diaries, organizational rosters, intelligence reports, pay books, postal-savings books, correspondence, and personal possessions for their translators to translate. They gathered increasing Japanese intelligence and put their Nisei women translators to work.

For months, the military repeated the pattern of training and integrating new groups of women linguists from MISLS into the structure of ATIS. In 1943, out of all the MISLS graduates who were sent abroad, forty percent were sent to the Southwest Pacific.

American and Australian divisions pushed forth on the New Guinea coast against Imperial Japanese forces. Some teams of Nisei linguists accompanied these forces. The military held back the majority of Nisei women translators to process the captured documents from prisoners of war.

In June 1944, ATIS underwent a change when the first 90 American servicewomen from the WAC relocated to ATIS. Prior, Australian Nisei servicewomen worked in clerical occupations for ATIS. Colonel Mashbir reported that American women's arrival hurt men's morale, as such groups of typists and stenographers held ranks of First Sergeant, Master Sergeant, and T-3s, outranking most of the male combat soldiers.

Preparing for WWII's Operation Olympics during the summer of 1945 required the strategic utilization of Japanese linguists. According to the War Department, this American invasion of the southern island of Kyushu needed forces from ATIS to translate the flood of captured Japanese documents from Pacific battlefields. As early as December 28, 1944, officials held the Washington Document Conference to give ATIS full authority over all MISLS Nisei linguists training in language classes. In preparation for Operation Olympics, ATIS moved some Nisei women translators from Brisbane to Manila.

=== Army Intensive Japanese Language School (AIJLS) ===
The Army Intensive Japanese Language School recruited other Nisei women linguists between 1942 and 1944. Although these linguists did not translate documents, they contributed to the U.S. war effort by training and teaching Japanese language classes to American soldiers.

In 1942, the Military Intelligence Division created a policy to enlist MIS Nisei under Caucasian language officers. Nevertheless, the supply of Japanese-speaking Caucasians was limited, and the few who were language attachés were already serving as team leaders. Yet, prejudice against Japanese Americans continued to transpire, and the War Department did not commission Nisei linguists as officers. Eventually, Professor Joseph K. Yamagiwa was appointed to be an educational director with a non-commissioned officer rank. As a Japanese-language instructor at the University of Michigan, in 1943, he hired both Issei and women to be AIJLS instructors.

Nisei women linguists who taught and assisted language classes lived together with their families near the campus where they taught. However, women still lived in fear because of prejudice against them. Yamagiwa wrote, “At first, some did not dare even to go to a church, let alone a movie theatre.”

== Post-war service ==
=== Civil censorship duties in Occupied Japan ===
Between the years of September 1945 to February 1946, after Japan's surrender and American troop's occupation in Japan, American occupiers worked to restore Japan's economy and society. The Civil Censorship Detachment required Nisei to perform tasks such as censorship to rebuild and restore day-to-day functions in Japan during the U.S. occupation. The military recruited fourteen Nisei women from Hawaii and arrived in Japan on November 1, 1945. Nisei women translators contributed to the civil censorship of newspapers, magazines, books, letters, and telegrams. Japanese nationals also performed such tasks under the supervision of American Nisei. In the post-war years, Nisei women translators and linguists helped bridge the language barrier between America and Japan.

=== Tokyo reassignment ===
Thirteen WAC graduates from the MISLS (eleven Nisei, one Chinese American, and one Caucasian) were assigned to travel to Tokyo, Japan to serve under the command of General Douglas MacArthur. They were accepted to translate captured documents and help rebuild relations with the Japanese. These women were continually removed from their flights because higher-ranking male officials claimed to have more significant assignments than the women's document translation tasks. Their travel, beginning on January 23, 1946, was extended to six weeks across the South Pacific and Hawaii. Miwako Yanamoto recounts this travel and her time as a “mannequin of democracy,” a name given to Nisei women who acted as unofficial ambassadors. Although their tasks were to translate Japanese military records, they were also expected to serve as role models, embodying Japanese women who were able to attain American womanhood. When the translators arrived in Tokyo, General MacArthur disapproved of the enlisted women serving overseas and thereafter returned them to the U.S. to serve as WACs.

== Notable Nisei women translators ==
=== Haruko Sugi Hurt ===
Haruko Sugi Hurt served on the WAC branch as a Nisei women translator. Before World War II, she worked as a saleswoman and dressmaker in Los Angeles. When war broke out, she and her family were evacuated and sent to a relocation center in Arkansas in 1942. Even during the war, she had a strong identification with the United States, demonstrated by her immediate reaction to the bombing of Pearl Harbor. Hurt claimed, "It was something that was just foreign to me. Something that country, over there, Japan, did." She then volunteered to be enlisted in 1944. Hurt was one of the WACs who served at the Pacific Military Intelligence Research Section in Washington D.C. alongside American, Canadian, British, and Australian servicemen and women who also trained in the Japanese language. She spoke Japanese and had the responsibility of translating captured documents from Japanese into English. Hurt also received the American Theater Ribbon, Victory Medal, and Good Conduct Medal for her contributions and dedication.

=== Sue Suzuko “Susie” (Ogata) Kato ===
Sue Suzuko (Ogata) Kato was one of the six original Nisei who entered the Women's Army Corps as a volunteer on December 13, 1943. In a biographical account of Kato, she claimed, “I joined the WACS to prove my Americanism.” She was 22 years old at the time from Denver, Colorado. She graduated from the MISLS in Fort Snelling in May 1945 and was stationed as a WAC at Ft. Devens, Massachusetts. She worked as a military intelligence translator in schooling and intelligence services during the war. One of her two brothers joined the 442nd Regiment. She went on to receive the Good Conduct medal. She claimed, “It was enriching, and I formed a lot of friendships - friends for life. . . . It was a learning experience for me. . . . I knew they needed WACs to take desk jobs so the fellows could go to the front. We did it for all Japanese Americans. I was proud to be an American.”

=== Miwako Yanamoto ===
Miwako Yanamoto was amongst the group of Japanese American women who were assigned to Tokyo after Japan's surrender. She remained in Japan during the U.S. occupation as a civil servant, translating documents that were used in the war crimes trials. She recounts living in “war-ravaged Japan” where she observed orphans trying to survive in any way they could, people living in subway stations, and others searching for food in garbage cans. “It was tough times for the Japanese,” she said.

== See also ==
- Asian American women in World War II
- Women's Army Corps
- Japanese-American service in World War II
- Allied Translator and Interpreter Section
- Military Intelligence Service (United States)
