= USS Crevalle =

Submarine of the United States

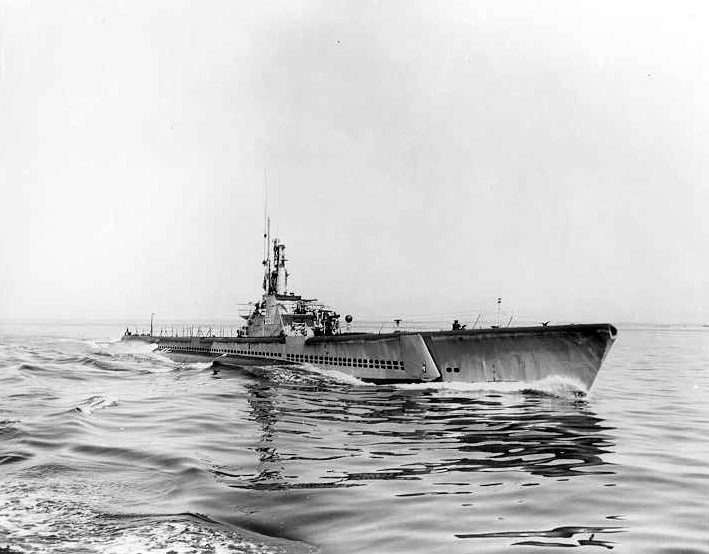
- Crevalle (SS-291), under way, c. 1944.

History

United States
- Builder: Portsmouth Naval Shipyard, Kittery, Maine
- Laid down: 14 November 1942
- Launched: 22 February 1943
- Commissioned: 24 June 1943
- Decommissioned: 29 July 1946
- Recommissioned: 6 September 1951
- Decommissioned: 19 August 1955
- Recommissioned: 11 April 1957
- Decommissioned: 9 March 1962
- Stricken: 15 April 1968
- Fate: Sold for scrap, 17 March 1971

General characteristics
- Class & type: Balao class diesel-electric submarine
- Displacement: 1,526 tons (1,550 t) surfaced; 2,414 tons (2,453 t) submerged
- Length: 311 ft 9 in (95.02 m)
- Beam: 27 ft 3 in (8.31 m)
- Draft: 16 ft 10 in (5.13 m) maximum
- Propulsion: 4 × General Motors Model 16-248 V16 Diesel engines driving electric generators; 2 × 126-cell Sargo batteries; 4 × high-speed General Electric electric motors with reduction gears; two propellers; 5,400 shp (4.0 MW) surfaced; 2,740 shp (2.0 MW) submerged
- Speed: 20.25 knots (38 km/h) surfaced; 8.75 knots (16 km/h) submerged
- Range: 11,000 nautical miles (20,000 km) surfaced at 10 knots (19 km/h)
- Endurance: 48 hours at 2 knots (3.7 km/h) submerged; 75 days on patrol
- Test depth: 400 ft (120 m)
- Complement: 10 officers, 70–71 enlisted
- Armament: 10 × 21-inch (533 mm) torpedo tubes; 6 forward, 4 aft; 24 torpedoes; 1 × 5-inch (127 mm) / 25 caliber deck gun; Bofors 40 mm and Oerlikon 20 mm cannon

USS Crevalle (SS/AGSS-291), a Balao-class submarine, was a ship of the United States Navy named for the crevalle, the yellow mackerel, a food fish, found on both coasts of tropical America, and in the Atlantic as far north as Cape Cod.

== Construction and commissioning ==
Crevalle was launched 22 February 1943 by the Portsmouth Navy Yard in Kittery, Maine, sponsored by Mrs. C. W. Fisher; and commissioned 24 June 1943.

== First and second war patrols, October 1943 – February 1944 ==
Crevalle arrived at Brisbane, Australia, from New London 11 October 1943, and after replenishing there and at Darwin, put to sea 27 October on her first war patrol, in the Sulu and South China Seas. On 15 November she sank the passenger-cargo ship Kyokko Maru, almost 7,000 tons. On Thursday 18 November 1943, off the entrance to Manila Bay, Crevalle torpedoed the Japanese aircraft carrier Akitsu Maru, incorrectly reporting Akitsu Maru as sunk. Crevalle made two more attacks on merchant ships before returning to Fremantle, Australia, for refit 7 December.

Her second war patrol, in the South China Sea from 30 December 1943 to 15 February 1944, found her attacking a submerged Japanese submarine on 7 January, only to know the frustration of premature torpedo explosion. On 9 January she sunk a sampan with gunfire In a hazardous special mission, she laid mines off Saigon on 14 and 15 January, and on 26 January sent a Japanese freighter "Busho Maru" to the bottom. A surface action with a small patrol boat on 11 February sank the enemy craft, and on 15 February, Crevalle fired at several targets in a large convoy, prudently clearing the area before the results of her firing could be verified.

== Third and fourth war patrols, April – August 1944 ==
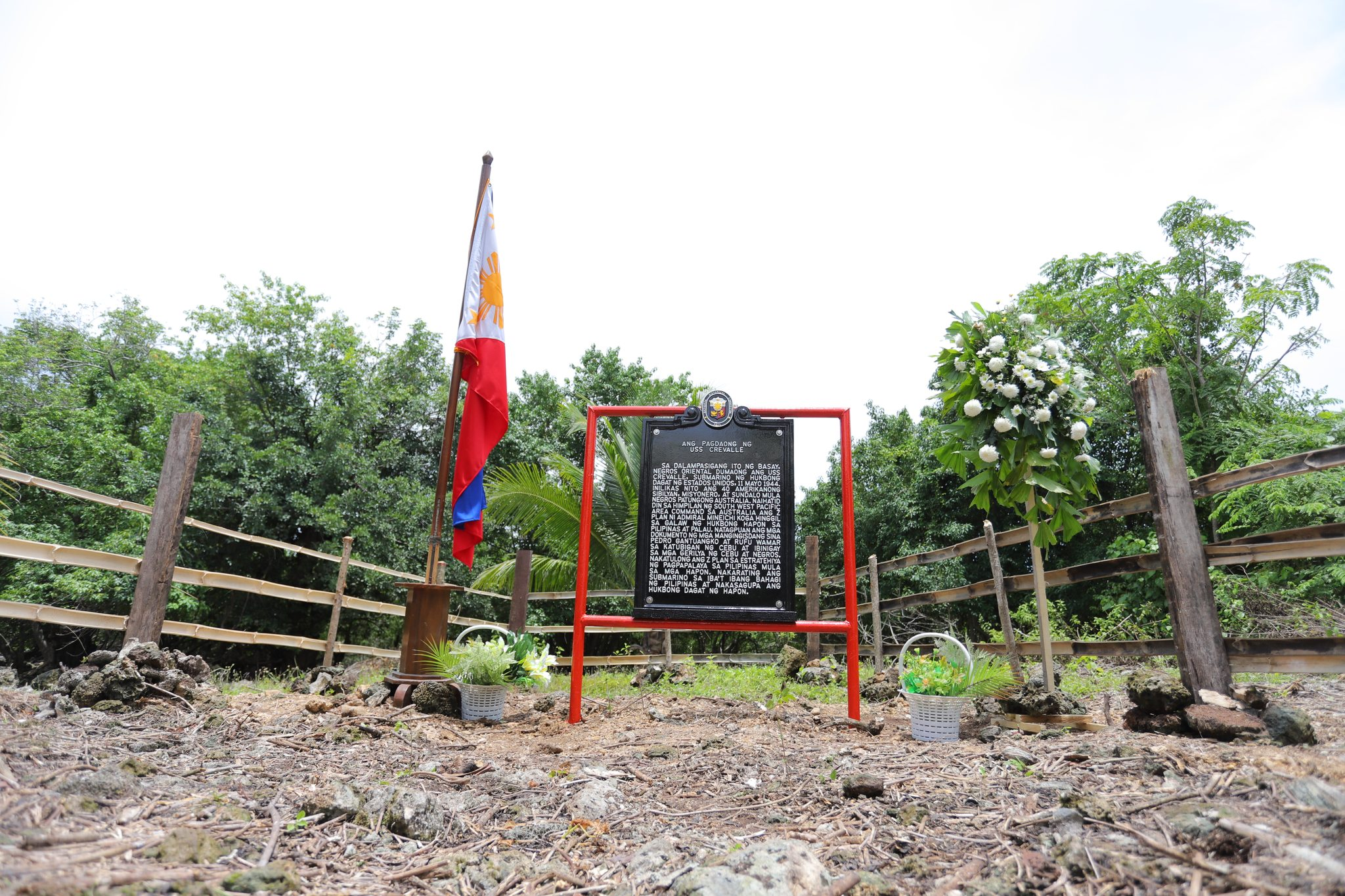
Historical marker installed by the National Historical Commission of the Philippines in 2022 to mark the site where the USS Crevalle approached Negros on May 11, 1944

On 16 March 1944 while refitting at Fremantle, Commander F. D. Walker assumed command, and on 4 April, Crevalle sailed for the South China Sea. She sank a freighter Kashiwa Maru on 25 April, and the oiler, Nisshin Maru (16,801 tons) 6 May, and on 11 May surfaced off Negros Island in the Philippines on another daring special mission. That special mission was to transport what appeared to be very important intelligence material regarding Japanese plans that had come into the hands of guerillas. The first idea of scheduling a submarine to deploy for that task developed into an urgent need both due to the realized importance of the documents and the Japanese hunt for them. Crevalle, on patrol off northern Borneo, was the nearest deployed submarine and was sent orders to pick up the documents with evacuation of American refugees as a cover.

She rescued 40 refugees here, including 28 women and children, and 4 men who had survived the Bataan Death March and made their escape. She also took off the family of an American missionary, who having seen his family to safety, returned ashore at the last minute to continue his ministry among the guerrillas. Along with her passengers, Crevalle recovered the important documents (the Japanese "Z plan"), and transferred all she could spare in the way of supplies to the guerrillas. In May 1944, while returning with her passengers to Darwin, Crevalle was spotted by a Japanese convoy on the third day of the journey. With four working torpedoes Capt. Walker maneuvered to attack, but was severely depth-charged by a Japanese bomber, a special ordeal for the passengers. The periscopes and radar were knocked out. They were landed safely at Darwin 19 May, 8 days after leaving the Philippines. Crevalle sailed on to refit at Fremantle.

For her fourth war patrol, Crevalle returned to the South China Sea, as well as cruising off the northern Philippines, between 21 June and 9 August 1944. In company with three other submarines for most of this patrol, Crevalle joined in a 30-hour pursuit and attack on a convoy on 25 July and 26 July, damaging one freighter Tosan Maru, and sinking the freighter "Aki Maru" already crippled by one of her groups. Two days later, Crevalle sank another freighter "Hakubasan Maru".

== Fifth war patrol, September 1944 ==
Refitted once more at Fremantle, Crevalle put to sea on her fifth war patrol 1 September 1944. Ten days later, she surfaced after a routine trim dive. A lookout, Bill Fritchen, was first through the hatch followed closely by the Officer of the Deck, Lt. Howard James Blind. Fifteen seconds later, the boat took a sharp down angle, and submerged with the upper and lower conning tower hatches open, washing the lookout overboard. The flow of water through the upper hatch, which was latched opened, prevented anyone in the conning tower from closing it. The lower hatch to the control was blocked by a piece of floor matting.

At 150 feet (50 m) the hatch was seen to close and lock. The ship continued diving to 190 feet (60 m) at an angle that reached 42 degrees down. With communications out, an alert machinist's mate, Robert L. Yeager, saved the submarine by backing full without orders. The pump room, control room and conning tower flooded completely, and all electrical equipment was inoperative. Yeager received the Silver Star for his action.

Bringing the submarine under control, her men surfaced and were able to recover the lookout, but not Lt. Blind. It was later determined that the stern planes had jammed in the full dive position causing the sudden dive. With Fritchen having been washed off the bridge when the submarine dived, it was concluded that Blind had hung on the ship, and sacrificed his life in unlatching the upper conning tower hatch, saving the submarine. Blind posthumously received the Navy Cross for his action. Blind, a graduate of Rensselaer Polytechnic Institute, had married a woman in Australia only two weeks before his death. Crevalle made her way back to Fremantle 22 September.

== October 1944–February 1945 ==
Crevalle departed Fremantle to head for California. During her voyage, the United States Navy Armed Guard detachment aboard an American Liberty ship mistook her for a Japanese submarine and opened fire on her with a 5-inch (127 mm) gun when Crevalle was in the Bass Strait south of Melbourne, Australia. Crevalle suffered no damage or casualties.. In California, she underwent an overhaul Mare Island Naval Shipyard, followed by training at Pearl Harbor. In the Pacific Ocean on 15 February 1945, the American Liberty ship SS Charles F. Amidon — which reported her position as 36°55′N 126°05′W — mistook Crevalle for a Japanese submarine and opened gunfire on her at a range of 2,800 yards (2,560 m), firing eight rounds and claiming two hits. All rounds actually missed, and Crevalle — which reported her own position as 36°54′N 126°02′W — suffered no damage or casualties.

== Sixth and seventh war patrols, March – July 1945 ==
The submarine put to sea on her sixth war patrol from Pearl Harbor 13 March 1945 under the command of Captain Everett Hartwell Steinmetz. Cruising in the East China Sea, she took up a lifeguard station during air strikes preparing for the Okinawa invasion, then on 23 – 25 April, made a hazardous search for a minefield believed to be located near the southern entrance to the Tsushima Straits.

She returned to Guam to refit from 3 to 27 May, then sailed for her seventh war patrol in the northeast section of the Sea of Japan under the command of Captain Everett Hartwell Steinmetz. She sank a freighter a day on 9 June (Hokuto Maru), 10 June (Daiki Maru), and 11 June (Hakuzan Maru No. 5); 13 June (two small sailing vessels by gunfire) and on 22 June inflicted heavy damage on the escort ship Kasado. Returning to Pearl Harbor 5 July, she got underway once more on 11 August, but received word of the end of hostilities before entering her assigned patrol area. She called at Guam and Saipan before returning to Pearl Harbor 10 September, then on 13 September, cleared for New York City, arriving 5 October.

The captain of these patrols, Everett Hartwell Steinmetz, received a Navy Cross for each patrol.

== Post-war service ==
After a repair period, Crevalle reported at New London, her assigned home port, 27 March 1946. She cruised to the Canal Zone and the Virgin Islands before being placed out of commission in reserve at New London 20 July 1946.

Recommissioned 6 September 1951, Crevalle took part in training, exercises, and fleet operations along the East Coast and in the Caribbean until 19 August 1955, when she was again placed out of commission in reserve at New London. Again recommissioned 11 April 1957, she resumed her East Coast and Caribbean operations through 1960.

Crevalle was reclassified an Auxiliary Research Submarine AGSS-291 in 1960. She was decommissioned, 9 March 1962. Crevalle was struck from the Naval Register, 15 April 1968, and sold for scrap, 17 March 1971.

All of Crevalle's war patrols, save the interrupted fifth, were designated as "successful", and the first four won her the Navy Unit Commendation for distinguished performance of duty as well as four battle stars. Her last two war patrols were recognized with one battle star awarded for the Okinawa operation. She is credited with having sunk a total of 51,814 tons of shipping, and shared in the credit for an additional 8,666 tons.
