= SS Charles F. Amidon =

Liberty ship of World War II

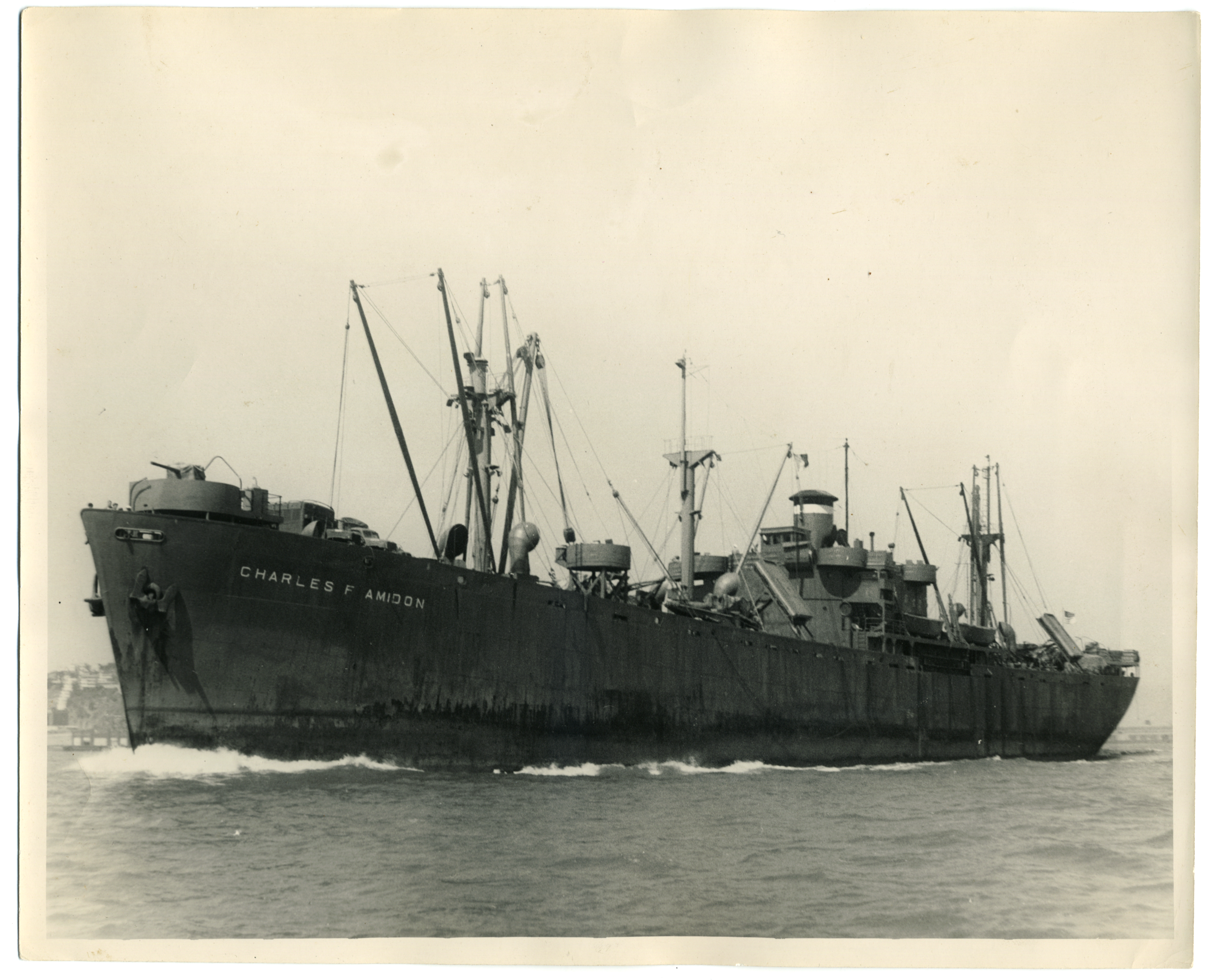
- Charles F. Amidon on 27 December 1943

History

United States
- Name: Charles F. Amidon
- Namesake: Charles F. Amidon
- Builder: Oregon Shipbuilding Corporation
- Yard number: 781
- Laid down: 24 September 1943
- Launched: 11 October 1943
- Completed: 19 October 1943
- Out of service: March 1961
- Homeport: Portland
- Identification: Callsign: KUBH
- Fate: Scrapped, 1961

General characteristics
- Class & type: Liberty ship; type EC2-S-C1, standard
- Tonnage: 10,865 LT DWT; 7,176 GRT
- Displacement: 3,380 long tons (3,434 t) (light); 14,245 long tons (14,474 t) (max)
- Length: 441 feet 6 inches (135 m) oa; 416 feet (127 m) pp; 427 feet (130 m) lwl
- Beam: 57 feet (17 m)
- Draft: 27 ft 9.25 in (8.4646 m)
- Installed power: 2 × Oil fired 450 °F (232 °C) boilers, operating at 220 psi (1,500 kPa); 2,500 hp (1,900 kW)
- Propulsion: 1 × triple-expansion steam engine, (manufactured by General Machinery Corp., Hamilton, Ohio); 1 × screw propeller
- Speed: 11.5 knots (21.3 km/h; 13.2 mph)
- Capacity: 562,608 cubic feet (15,931 m^{3}) (grain); 499,573 cubic feet (14,146 m^{3}) (bale)
- Complement: 38–62 USMM; 21–40 USNAG
- Armament: Varied by ship; Bow-mounted 3-inch (76 mm)/50-caliber gun; Stern-mounted 4-inch (102 mm)/50-caliber gun; 2–8 × single 20-millimeter (0.79 in) Oerlikon anti-aircraft (AA) cannons and/or, 2–8 × 37-millimeter (1.46 in) M1 AA guns

SS Charles F. Amidon was an American Liberty ship built in 1943 for service in World War II. Her namesake was Charles F. Amidon, an American Judge from 1896 to 1928.

== Description ==
The ship was 442 ft 8 in (134.92 m) long overall (417 ft 9 in (127.33 m) between perpendiculars, 427 ft 0 in (130.15 m) waterline), with a beam of 57 ft 0 in (17.37 m). She had a depth of 34 ft 8 in (10.57 m) and a draught of 27 ft 9 in (8.46 m). She was assessed at 7,210 GRT, 4,880 NRT, 10,856 DWT.

She was powered by a triple expansion steam engine, which had cylinders of 24.5 inches (62 cm), 37 inches (94 cm) and 70 inches (180 cm) diameter by 70 inches (180 cm) stroke. The engine was built by the Worthington Pump & Machinery Corporation, Harrison, New Jersey. It drove a single screw propeller, which could propel the ship at 11 knots (20 km/h).

== Construction and career ==
This ship was built by Oregon Shipbuilding Corporation in Portland. She was laid down on 24 September 1943 and launched on 11 October 1943, later completed on 19 October 1943. She was operated by the Grace Lines

She departed Colombo together with Convoy JC 54B on 4 July 1944 for Calcutta while carrying army stores, she arrived six days later. The ship returned to Colombo with Convoy CJ 37 on 2 August. Carlos Carrillo together with Convoy GUS 50 departed from Port Said, on 23 August, for Hampton Roads. She again departed from Hampton Roads for Port Said with Convoy UGS 57 from 12 October until 18 September. The ship then left with Convoy GUS 57, for Cristóbal, from 15 November until 2 December.

Throughout 1945, Charles F. Amidon made independent trips to Eniwetok, Port Townsend, Hagushi, Kossol Roads, Tacloban, Pearl Harbor, San Francisco, Ulithi, Okinawa, Takuu and Balboa. On 15 February 1945, she was in the Pacific Ocean at position 36°55′N 126°05′W when she mistook the U.S. Navy submarine USS Crevalle (SS-291) for a Japanese submarine and opened gunfire on her at a range of 2,800 yards (2,560 m), firing eight rounds and claiming two hits. All rounds actually missed, and Crevalle — which reported her own position as 36°54′N 126°02′W — suffered no damage or casualties.

In 1946, Charles F. Amidon was transferred to the United States Department of Commerce in Portland, Oregon. In March 1961, she was then sold to Zidell Explorations Inc., Tacoma for opphogging.

Charles F. Amidon was scrapped in 1961 after being sold to Ankom on 16 March 1961.
