= Sidney Mashbir =

US Army military intelligence officer (1891–1973)

Sidney Forrester Mashbir
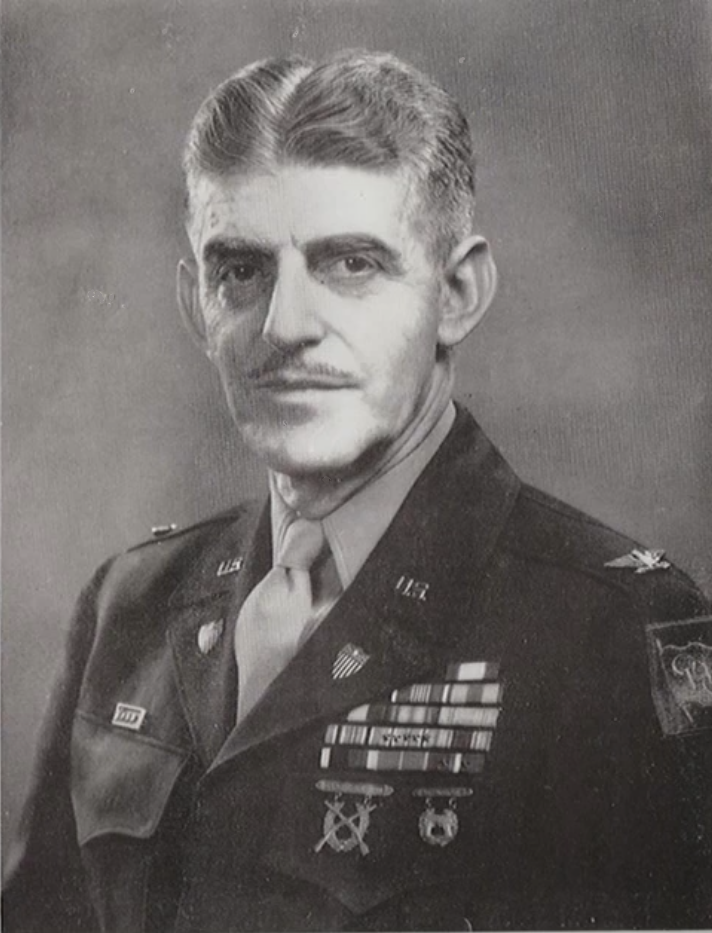
- Colonel Sidney F. Mashbir, 1951
- Born: 12 September 1891; Manhattan, New York
- Died: 13 June 1973 (aged 81)
- Burial place: Fort Rosecrans National Cemetery, Point Loma, California
- Military career
- Allegiance: United States of America
- Branch: United States Army
- Service years: 1904–1939; 1942–1951
- Rank: Colonel
- Nickname: Sid
- Service number: O-191029
- Units: Allied Translator and Interpreter Section (ATIS), Military Intelligence Service
- Conflicts: Border War; World War II
- Awards: Army Distinguished Service Medal; Army Commendation Medal (6)
- Other work: Executive officer for the Army Adjutant General's Office in Washington

Sidney Forrester Mashbir (12 September 1891 – 13 June 1973) was a senior officer in the United States Army who was primarily involved in military intelligence. Born in New York, he served in the Arizona Army National Guard during the Mexican-American Border War. Mashbir then held several posts in intelligence positions, taking credit for catching the first German spy in the United States, before departing for on a four-year assignment as a language officer to Japan in 1920. He resigned from the army in 1923 in an attempt to execute his own master plan devised to extract intelligence from Japan in event of a war. His plan failed as a result of the Great Kantō earthquake in September 1923 and he was left bankrupt; he consequently returned to the US as an engineering businessman.

In 1937, Mashbir returned to Japan in a second attempt to activate his plan on behalf of the Office of Naval Intelligence; it again failed, and Mashbir was dis-enrolled from the reserves in 1939. However, following the attack on Pearl Harbor, Mashbir was re-enrolled in January 1942 to lead the Allied Translator and Interpreter Section of Southwest Pacific Area, where he quickly rose to the rank of colonel. He later served as the executive officer for the Army Adjutant General's Office before retiring in 1951.

== Early life ==
Sidney Mashbir was born in Manhattan, New York, on 12 September 1891, but moved to Safford, Arizona, in 1899. Sidney's father was Professor Eliazar S. Mashbir, a Russian immigrant who was well-educated and became the first Russian-speaking attorney to practice law in New York City. Sidney's mother, Frieda Freudenthal was also well-educated, and in 1906 became the postmistress of Safford, which included the area of Solomonville.

Mashbir attended public schools in Safford and Tucson, later studying engineering at the University of Arizona for six months each year until 1911, whilst simultaneously maintaining a career as an engineering draughtsman, primarily for the engineering department of Tucson, and railroad companies. He married his first wife Blanche Beckwith on 12 September 1913, with whom he had his first son, Forrester Mashbir; the couple separated during the mid/late-1920s.

== Military career ==
=== Early service ===
Mashbir joined the Arizona National Guard at a young age, and served as the bugler of Company B in 1904. He later became the first lieutenant and adjutant of the University Battalion whilst studying at the University of Arizona. In 1912, he served as a lieutenant in Company K of the National Guard encampment, which based at Fort Huachuca. The senior instructor at the time was Captain Louis Joseph Van Schaick.

In early 1916, Mashbir received his first official intelligence assignment, when he was assigned as the assistant intelligence officer of the Ajo-Yuma district of Arizona as a part of the first Arizona Infantry under General Frederick Funston. The unit was at the time was involved in the Mexican-American Border War. Mashbir's duties included mapping roads, trails and waterholes in northern Sonora. Additionally he would scout Mexican towns with Papago Indian scouts, reporting on the strength and equipment of Mexican garrisons and installing primitive wiretaps on Mexican communication lines. Mashbir was also responsible for investigating Japan's physical presence in Mexico at the time.

In late 1916, Mashbir applied for a commission in the Regular Army and was accepted with General Funston's support despite the army's policy that married men not be accepted. After attending the Army Service Schools at Fort Leavenworth, he joined the 22nd Infantry Regiment, which was stationed at Governors Island, New York, but was soon detailed for counterespionage duty and was recommended to join a new counterintelligence service that was being formed.

On 10 September 1917 Mashbir was detailed as assistant to the department intelligence officer at Governors Island. He enrolled in the Military Intelligence Division G-2 Reserves, where he was promoted to temporary lieutenant colonel. During this time he wrote the Provisional Rules for Counter Espionage, Eastern Department, which would become a model for future counterintelligence manuals until World War II, as well as a 52-page book titled Ten Lessons in Bayonet Fighting published by George Banta Publishing Company at the end of 1917. Mashbir is also credited with investigations as a coast defense intelligence officer at Fort Hamilton, which uncovered the first German spy to be apprehended in the United States, Paul Otto Kuhn.

=== Between the wars ===
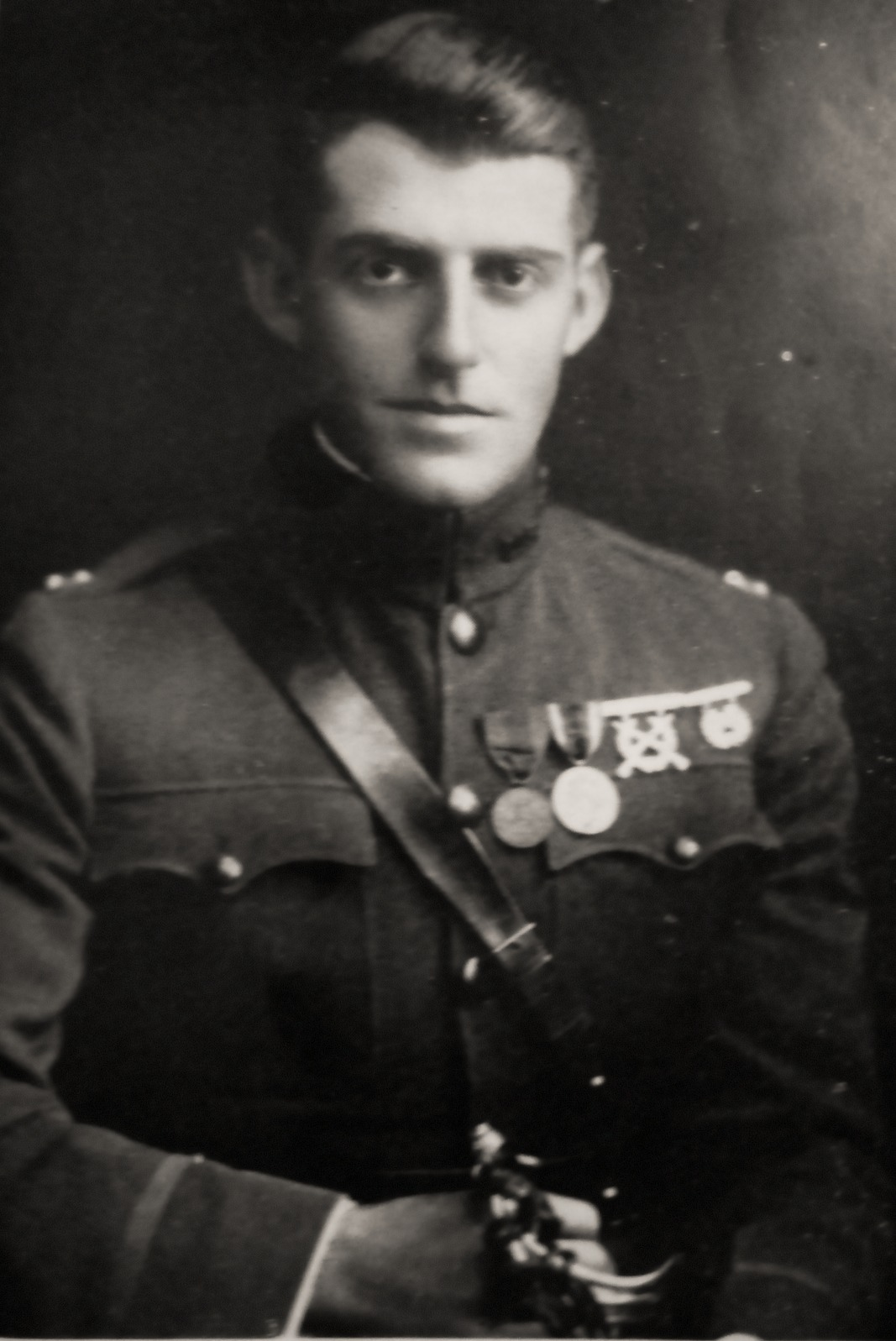
Sidney Mashbir as a Language Officer in Tokyo (January 1923); taken prior to resigning from the Regular Army and his ill-fated attempt to execute his M-Plan in Japan

Following World War I, Mashbir held a position teaching military science and tactics at Syracuse University, where he first considered studying the Japanese language and culture. In August 1919, he asked the War Department if he could embark on this course of study, stating that it was his intention to apply for a posting to Japan for the purpose of learning the language if the War Department saw fit. Ranked captain, Mashbir was assigned as one of four US Army Language Officers in Japan on 7 July 1920. He relocated to Tokyo the following month to begin his four-year tour. When he arrived he reported for duty to Lieutenant Colonel Charles Burnett, the military attaché. Having few Army colleagues, while in Tokyo Mashbir sought the company of other intelligence professionals in the navy, one of whom was an assistant naval attaché, Lieutenant-Commander Ellis M. Zacharias, with whom Mashbir began a lifelong friendship and collaboration. In July 1922, at Zacharias' request, Mashbir secretly worked day and night to produce a secret plan to gather intelligence that could either be used to maintain peace between the U.S. and Japan, or get information out of Japan in case of war. This plan became known as M-Plan, named after Mashbir. His undisclosed activities working for the naval attaché did not sit well with his superiors, however.

During 1921-1923 while stationed in Japan as a Japanese language student, Mashbir developed a close friendship and alliance with influential Japanese leaders such as Prince Iyesato Tokugawa and Baron Eiichi Shibusawa. During the 1920s and 1930s worked together to maintain peace between their two nations. In 1923, Mashbir headed an emergency relief effort to assist the Japanese during the Great Kanto Earthquake.

In order to establish a network of foreign businessmen in Japan who could be turned into an intelligence network in time of war, it was suggested by his commander, Colonel Burnett, that Mashbir resign his commission and become a businessman in Tokyo himself, in order to put the M-Plan in effect. Consequently, Mashbir resigned in 1923 to pursue business interests and undercover secret intelligence operations, under the impression that he could be reinstated in the Army when his work was done. However the Great Kantō earthquake of September 1923 bankrupted him and, when he sought reinstatement in the military, discovered that it was not possible, because the reinstatement clause of the law under which he had resigned was no longer valid. Neither Mashbir nor Colonel Burnett, who had urged Mashbir to resign, was aware of this, and it become a sticking point for Mashbir in later life, noting that even in 1926 the law was still being reprinted without the correct clause. Consequently, the M-Plan to establish an intelligence network in Japan was scrapped. Mashbir returned to the United States in 1926 under the impression that his military career was over, and sought employment selling refrigerators. He managed to rejoin the Military Intelligence Division G-2 Reserves, but only spent one year in active duty beginning in the summer of 1927 during which time he updated the Order of Battle documentation on Japan (War Plan Orange). For the next ten years he returned to his original profession of engineering, including some government work on technical standards.

In 1937, Mashbir returned to Japan after an 11-year absence in a second attempt to launch the M-Plan on behalf of the Office of Naval Intelligence and his friend, naval attaché Zacharias. At that time, there was still hope that war between Japan and America might still be prevented. This mission aroused suspicions among ill-informed military attachés in Tokyo and an investigation was started into Mashbir. In a misunderstanding that would come close to damaging his career irreparably once more, Mashbir was investigated in Hawaii and, influenced by the military attaché suspicions, a prejudicial report based upon erroneous assumptions was delivered on 24 June 1937. Colonel Mashbir was advised on 25 February 1939 that he was disenrolled from the Military Intelligence Division G2 Reserves for failure to report on the specified day for physical examination. However, it appeared that the actual cause of the disenrollment was due to suspicions aroused by failure to communicate to uninformed individuals the nature and the extent of the work on which he was actually engaged. Mashbir's dismissal and the failure to implement an intelligence network such as that suggested in Mashbir's M-Plan has been described as a key factor in the United States' failure to have more information on Japan before the attack on Pearl Harbor on 7 December 1941.

=== World War II and after ===
Despite Mashbir's dismissal, the outbreak of hostilities in World War II between Japan and the US, led to him being immediately sought after by the Signal Corps due to his military experience, wide technical skill and knowledge of the Japanese language. He was sworn in for active duty on 24 January 1942 and sent to Brisbane, Australia, and later Manila, Philippines to co-ordinate the inter-service joint Australian/American Allied Translator and Interpreter Section (ATIS), within the Southwest Pacific Area (SWPA). It was at this time that the suspicions which lingered about Mashbir's 1937 mission to Japan on behalf of Naval Intelligence were cleared up with the assistance of Admiral Zacharias, now assistant director of Naval Intelligence, interceding with the Assistant Chief of Staff of G2. Colonel Mashbir and Commander Ellis M. Zacharias worked together for four months at the direction of Fleet Admiral Joseph Ernest King, and prepared the first draft and implementing directives for the creation of what would become the Central Intelligence Agency.

The prompt accomplishments of the Allied Translator and Interpreter Section and Mashbir's executive ability resulted in Mashbir being promoted to full colonel by General Douglas MacArthur after only one month. Mashbir then joined the forefront of MacArthur's intelligence activities and Japanese surrender negotiations, remaining the commandant of ATIS until December 1945. He was made famous at the time in the motion picture and still photograph of the preliminary surrender negotiations at Manila, as the man who pushed the ink-well, indicating that General Richard K. Sutherland should correct the Japanese Instrument of Surrender; and also as the man who thumbed the Japanese Lieutenant General Torashirō Kawabe along as he attempted to shake hands. The second incident provoked some mixed feelings, including sentiment that it could have damaged surrender talks. Mashbir also played a critical role retrieving and translating the Z Plan and in organizing the final surrender of Japan. In his autobiography, Mashbir explained that he was not permitted to shake hands, and that it would have been rude to point, which ultimately led to the awkward thumbing motion that was photographed.

Colonel Mashbir left Japan on 8 December 1945 to serve on the management staff of the adjutant general's office in Washington, later becoming the executive officer. He retired in October 1951, having reached the statutory age of 60. As a result of his military service, Mashbir received several medals including the Army Distinguished Service Medal, Army Commendation Medal (Silver Oak Leaf Cluster), Army of Occupation Medal, World War II Victory Medal, American Defense Service Medal and American Campaign Medal. He was also recommended to become an Officer of the Order of the British Empire (Honorary) in 1946 by the Australian governor-general, as was presented OBE insignia in 1948.

== Later life ==
Two years after retiring, Mashbir published a 374-page memoir describing his military and intelligence career titled: I Was an American Spy (Vantage Press. New York, 1953). In Chapter 13, "The Nisei" (whom Mashbir used as translators in ATIS) he pays tribute to Military Intelligence Service (MIS) soldiers in these words: "The United States of America owes a debt to these men and to their families which it can never fully repay."

Because of the highly classified top-secret nature of ATIS missions, the work of many MIS soldiers and knowledge of Mashbir and his colleagues was unknown to the public during WWII, and even decades afterwards. The role and activities of the MIS was kept in secrecy for more than 30 years; the few records about its activities were finally made available to the public in 1972 under the Freedom of Information Act, however much still remains unknown today. Consequently, many MIS soldiers did not receive recognition or decorations for their efforts. They became "unsung heroes", unacknowledged for their contributions in wartime as well as postwar activities. An exception to this was the Military Intelligence Hall of Fame, of which Mashbir was inducted in 1988.

In 2017 in appreciation of Colonel Mashbir's contributions to America's military preparedness the University of Arizona and Syracuse University both nominated Colonel Mashbir as their choice for the National ROTC Hall of Fame. Candidates are chosen by ROTC programs from across the nation. Mashbir attended the University of Arizona and headed their student ROTC program. At Syracuse University, Colonel Mashbir served as an instructor teaching military science and launched that university's first Federally Accredited ROTC Program.

Sidney Mashbir died on 13 June 1973 and was buried at Fort Rosecrans National Cemetery, Point Loma, California. His second wife, Mary Irene (Donahue) Mashbir (born 10 April 1896), with whom he had his second son, Don, and with whom he was buried, died earlier on 3 May 1964. He was survived by his third wife, Alice Moore Mashbir (1928–2003), and his two sons, Forrester Mashbir (1921–2003) and Don Stuart Mashbir (1931–2008).

== See also ==
- Charles A. Willoughby
- Military Intelligence Division
- Military Intelligence Corps

== Sources ==
- Mashbir, Sidney (1953). I Was An American Spy. New York: Vantage Press. OCLC 1243892.
- Mashbir, Colonel Sidney Forrester; Katz, Stan S. (2018). I Was an American Spy: 65th Anniversary Edition. Horizon Productions. ISBN 978-0-9903349-9-6.
- Katz, Stan S. (2017). The Emperor and the Spy: The Secret Alliance to Prevent World War II. California: Horizon Productions. ISBN 978-0-9903349-4-1. at Internet Archive
- Zacharias, Ellis (1946). Secret Missions: The Story of an Intelligence Officer. New York: G. P. Putnam’s Sons. OCLC 2101120. at Internet Archive
