= Haruko Sugi Hurt =

Haruko Sugi Hurt (January 3, 1915-January 19, 2012) was a Japanese-American language translator who was on the Women’s Army Corps (WAC) service branch during World War II. She served at the Pacific Military Intelligence Research Section (PACMIRS) after graduating from the Military Intelligence Service Language School (MISLS) from 1945-1946. After her time with PACMIRS in Camp Ritchie, Maryland, she served at the Washington Document Center in Washington D.C., translating captured documents from Japanese into English.

== Early life and prewar ==
Haruko Sugi Hurt was born in Parlier, California, U.S.A. on January 3, 1915. Her father was a farmer in San Joaquin Valley, an agricultural region in Central California. When Haruko was young, her family moved to Gardena, seeking better economic opportunities after hearing that Japanese immigrant families owned truck gardens in Southern California. At this time, the Sugi family was in great financial debt, and she could not afford to have some of the luxuries her friends and classmates from school had. Many of her friends were also from farming communities, and they were children of truck gardeners. She was mostly surrounded by Caucasian people, and no other Japanese families resided in this area except for one. Haruko Sugi Hurt recounts that although the Caucasian children in her classes were friendly, she did not come into social contact with any non-Japanese families and their children outside of school. She states that in her area that was predominantly a Caucasian community, Japanese immigrants and their children suffered discrimination.

At the time, Japanese people were not allowed to buy agricultural land because Alien Land Laws restricted leases to three years. Since 1926, they leased then eventually bought their Gardena house.

Her father was elderly and found it challenging to find jobs because of his age and condition. He mainly worked for others, never establishing a truck garden of his own. Her mother learned how to massage, worked as a temporary housekeeper, and brought in most of the income. Her parents taught Haruko to be honest, disciplined and value education. Her parents enrolled her in a Japanese language school in her local area, which required tuition, but they were willing to set aside money for her to attend this school.

After graduating high school, her family could not afford college, so they sent her to sewing school. There, she was employed at the Kurata Department Store sewing cotton dresses. She later quit because her boss, Mr. Higashi, would not raise her salary.

== During WWII ==
During World War II, following the enforcement of Executive Order 9066 in 1942, she and her family were confined to the Santa Anita Assembly Center. They were housed in tar-paper barracks for six months until the internment camps were completed. She was then incarcerated at the Rohwer camp in Arkansas for six months, from the end of October to April. She had never experienced such a cold climate. In the camp, she received a job as a hospital worker.

When the camp notified people they could leave to join the military, her parents were very supportive and understanding. She was the first to leave out of her four siblings, and she was the oldest. In the later months of 1944, her involvement in the military began. Haruko previously knew about the Japanese language school run by the army in Snelling.

Just before she enlisted into the WACs, she worked for the war department to process V-mail at the Chicago station. This was a federal job under the army, and male supervisors ran the operations.

After the war began, her family was evacuated to the Jerome Relocation Center in southeastern Arkansas behind barbed wire in 1942. This internment camp was one of two temporary Arkansas sites for over 8,000 Japanese American internees during World War II.

In 1945, Haruko Sugi Hurt joined the Women’s Army Corps (WACs) and moved to Fort Snelling, Minnesota. She was a typist in the headquarters office. When she volunteered to join the WACs, she trained for six weeks to become a soldier in Des Moines as the only Japanese American and one of the few Asian women in her class. She was treated kindly, even with lingering prejudice.

After joining the WACs, she hoped to be assigned to a position where she could apply her linguistic ability to the job since she was one of several Nisei in the group who were fluent in Japanese.

She attended the MISLS in January 1945 and was still training when the war ended. She studied Japanese language, military terminology, and Japanese geography. When she graduated, part of her graduating class was sent to Japan as a part of the army of occupation. In contrast, the military sent her and others to Maryland, where the Pacific Military Intelligence Research Section (PACMIRS) resided, and then Washington, D.C. to work in the Washington Document Center. She translated documents there.

When she moved to Washington D.C., she worked in a WAC facility on C Street. When working as a translator, she was assigned to one of several teams that consisted of five or six enlisted members, an officer, and a team leader, but everyone worked on their separate assignments. Her time living in a communal space was not new as she had familiarized herself with it during her one year living in the Jerome Japanese American relocation center in Arkansas, an internment camp for Issei, Nisei, and Sansei, before her service. In D.C., she lived in a sizeable dorm-like room with army cots lined in double rows and a foot locker at the end. She ate in the mess hall, visited the United Service Organization (USO) during her free time, and traveled to New York and Baltimore on days off and furloughs.

During her service, she worked alongside American, Canadian, British, and Australian servicemen who shared the same knowledge and training in the Japanese language. She enjoyed meeting soldiers assigned to the same area as her and considered it a “broadening” experience. Some women, especially British soldiers, were less friendly to her and other Nisei individuals but Hurt considered this a minor matter.

In 1946, she was discharged from the army and returned home to Gardena, California, where her parents resided.

== Postwar ==
As a result of the G.I. Bill, Hurt was able to attend college at the University of Southern California (USC) after she was discharged in 1946 and went on to receive her Masters Degree in Social Work. She married an ex-navy man in college in 1951 whom she outranked as a former G.I. veteran. In 1951, she and her husband bought a home in Westwood and adopted two children. In 1984, she and her husband gained a divorce. Thereafter, raising her children alone, she also taught English as a Second Language (ESL), parent education, and child observation classes. She finally retired when she was seventy years old.

After Haruko’s service, she received the American Theatre Ribbon, Victory Medal, and Good Conduct Medal.

She was active in the Southern California Japanese American Historical Society after selling her home in Westwood and moving to Gardena. She died on January 19, 2012.
