= Pierre Moulin =

French historian (1948–2016)

Pierre Moulin

Pierre Moulin (November 1, 1948 – April 11, 2016) was a French historian author, specializing in World War II, Nisei Japanese Americans, the Holocaust as well as Hawaiian history.

Several of his published books are available in Pearl Harbor Historic Sites gift shops. In the final years of his life he helped promote his books at the Pearl Harbor Visitor Center, autographing them as he got to meet with visitors from all over the world. He died on April 11, 2016, in Honolulu, O`ahu, Hawai`i.

== Biography ==
Moulin was born in Bruyeres-in-Vosges on November 1, 1948. At 20 he discovered America on a three-month trip on Greyhound buses. He then travelled all over the World and wrote several books in French.

Hawaii was one of his first objectives in 1969. His active participation during the festivities of the 25th anniversary of the liberation as interpreter and vice-president of the sistercityship involved himself deeply in these unique relationships. Seven years later he brought, for the first time, a group of Bruyerans to Honolulu for an unforgettable “Visit to Paradise” and created the Bruyeres-Hawaii Friendship Committee which established a new bond between the two sister cities: Bruyeres and Honolulu. When writing « Visit to Paradise », which was the title of his first book in 1976, he never pictured himself becoming the well-known historian who he is now. Since his young years, Pierre was fascinated by history. Historian of the City of Bruyeres, Pierre was directly involved in World War II through the story of his father, leader of the FFI and OSS agent who never talked. He discovered an incredible page of glory written by the US Samurais and resolved to publish it and to show to the entire world the legend of his heroes. He published successively: « U.S. Samurais in Lorraine », « Chronicle of Bruyeres-in-Vosges », « 50th anniversary of the Liberation of Vosges », « The Guide of the Peace and Freedom trail », « US Samurais in Bruyeres » in English, and « Bruyeres-in-Vosges, 2000 years of History through his streets ».

Working toward an accomplishment of his vision of the future, he created in 1989 the Peace and Freedom Trail on the path of the 100/442nd RCT with a view to forever imprint the mark of the US Samurais onto Bruyeres soil. He helped American of Japanese ancestry get recognition for their wartime contributions, which was finally made into a Civil Liberties Act by President Ronald Reagan in 1988. In 1994, he was named by the Prefect of the State of Vosges to organize the ceremonies of the Liberation of the Vosges.

He recently discovered the participation of the US Samurais in the liberation of Dachau, the first Nazi concentration camp and wrote Dachau, Holocaust and US Samurais. For his contribution as member of Visas for life, Organization who search the diplomats who saved the Jews in WWII, he received for the State of Israel, the commemorative medals of Raoul Wallenberg, Sempo Sugihara and Carl Lutz. He was chosen in April 2009 as guest speaker for the Day of Remembrance of the Holocaust by the US Army in Hawaii. he is now upgrading the Go for Broke exhibit in the US Army Museum of Hawaii and was asked to build the Korean, Vietnam and the War on terror exhibits.

In Hawaii, his second home, he volunteered at the U.S. Army Museum of Hawaii, and wrote the history of Hawaii in a new series. Fort DeRussy, U.S. Army Museum of Hawaii was published in May 2008 and Punchbowl, Arlington of the Pacific was printed in March 2010. A new masterpiece with the 100th/442nd RCT entire history from Pearl Harbor to the victory in Italy in the first part and the history of the Military Intelligence Service in the Pacific. He also discovered proof that the Hawaiian Islands were discovered by an Italian pilot working for the Portuguese before James Cook.

Pierre was made an Honorary Citizen of many cities in the United States, as Fresno (California), San Antonio (Texas) and Honolulu (Hawaii). Honorary member of the Go For Broke Association, the National Japanese American Historical Society, as well as the Military Intelligence Service, he is also proud to be an Honorary Member of K company 100/442nd RCT (a decorated unit in American history) as well as of the Texas 141st Regiment of the US 36th Division (the famous Fort Alamo Regiment).

=== Bibliography ===
Note: Some of these books are reprints or translations of books already listed. Also, one or more ISBNs appear to be reused from book to book, at least according to worldcat.org.

- 1976 – Visite au Paradis in French (self published)
- 1988 – U.S. Samourais en Lorraine in French (Editions Gerard Louis) ISBN 2-907016-03-2
- 1988 – Chronique de Bruyeres-en-Vosges in French (Editions Gerard Louis)
- 1993 – U.S. Samurais in Bruyeres in English (Editions CPL) ISBN 2-9599984-05
- 1994 – 50eme Anniversaire de la Liberation des Vosges Bilingue (Editions CPL)
- 1994 – Guide du Chemin de la Paix et de la Liberte in French (Editions CPL)
- 2000 – Bruyeres-en-Vosges 2000 ans d'Histoire in French (Editions CPL)
- 2007 – Dachau, Holocaust and U.S. Samurais – Nisei soldiers first in Dachau
- 2007 – A history of Fort DeRussy : U.S. Army Museum of Hawaiʻi (Mutual Publishing Editions) ISBN 9781566478502
- 2010 – A History of ... Punchbowl – Arlington of the Pacific (Mutual Publishing Editions)
- American Samurais (AuthorHouse publishing)

=== Awards ===
- Honorary Citizen of Honolulu (Hawaii) (1976)
- Honorary Citizen of San Antonio (Texas) (1993)
- Honorary Citizen of Fresno (California) 1988
- Honorary Member of the 442nd RCT company K (Most decorated Unit in U.S. Military History)
- Honorary Member of the 36th Infantry Division – 141st Regiment (Regiment du Fort Alamo)
- Honorary and Life member of the Go for Broke Inc (1986)
- Honorary and Life member of the National Japanese American Historical Society (1986)
- Honorary and Life member of the Military Intelligence Service (North California) (1993)
- Honorary and Life member of the 141st Infantry regiment Association
- Honorary and Life member of the 442nd Veterans Club Hawaii
- Member of the Office of Strategic Service Society
- Recipient of the Israeli Commemorative Medals of Wallenberg, Sugihara and Lutz
- Recipient of the Kansha Medal (Japanese American) (1993)
- Recipient of the Honor Paddle from the U.S. Army Pacific (2009)
- Recipient of the Gold Medal of the Peace and Freedom Trail (1989)

=== Family history ===
- Grandson of Charles Etienne (FFI) Deputy Mayor of Bruyeres who erected the first Memorial to the 100th/442nd in Bruyeres in 1947.
- Son of Renee Etienne (FFI) and Max-Henri Moulin (FFI) and member of the Office of Strategic Service. Legion of Merit (1949) awarded by William Joseph Donovan, Two Croix de Guerre with Bronze Star (1940–1944), Volunteer Fighter of the French Resistance Medal, French Recognition for War acts, etc.
