= Asian American women in World War II =

Asian American women during World War II served many crucial functions that tend to be overlooked, or erased entirely, from modern history books. Women’s roles are under-appreciated or unmentioned in the context of war; these women, however, were tasked with various duties that greatly aided American forces going into combat. Japanese American women, known as “Nisei”, contributed to war efforts by providing medical care as nurses and doctors, as well as serving as military intelligence officials and linguists. These women were also on the front lines of combat in many instances, with Filipino American women fighting as an underground coalition resistance in the Philippines. Asian American women initially began their involvement with the formation of the Army Nurse Corps (ANC) and Women's Army Corps (WAC), serving as linguists and translators at Fort Snelling, Minnesota. Their roles became increasingly more prominent and involved, however, with the bombing at Pearl Harbor and the United States' entry into the war against Japan.

== Prominent roles of Asian American women ==
The Women’s Army Corps initially began accepting women to serve in various roles in February and November 1943. Up until then, Asian American women’s participation in the war was rather nonexistent. The war proved to be a drastic turning point when it came to women’s involvement—as opposed to conforming to traditional roles as housekeepers and maids, Japanese women engaged in more proactive roles. Nisei women generally worked alongside women of other races due to the limited number of Japanese American women, compared to men who were largely segregated and placed in various Japanese American units, such as the 442nd Regimental Combat Team.

Women's roles consisted of interpreting and translating retrieved documents, with some women even serving in the Army Air Force as photo interpreters, weather forecasters, and air traffic controllers. Filipino women were tasked with the arduous role of assisting American forces during the 3-year period of Japanese occupation. These women worked furtively in helping American prisoners of war through smuggling in food and medicine, as well as retrieving information on Japanese military operations.

== Experiences of Nisei women ==
Many Nisei and other Asian American women that served during the war did so to express devotion and loyalty to the United States but, more likely, because they wanted the war to end. For many of the women, who had loved ones that were enlisted or families that were already placed in Japanese American internment camps, serving could signal the end of the grim war. Serving also meant being able to travel for these women, as well as gaining education and job training that would be provided by the military. While the military expected around 500 Nisei women to volunteer during the war, actual numbers ranged between 100-200—far fewer than the anticipated amount. This meant that many women were tasked with multiple responsibilities to accommodate for the lack of numbers. The portrayal of Nisei women volunteering during the war was also frequently sexualized; wartime has commonly been male-dominated, so having young women fulfill various duties was uncommon and promoted a sense of promiscuity within the military. These women were also, traditionally, expected to embrace their femininity and adhere to conventional roles, such as doing clerical work. Because of this, many pictures portray Nisei women as brandishing red lipstick and wearing short skirts as part of their military attire—they were expected to act professionally, yet conform to an image that was highly sexualized. Nonetheless, these women transcended cultural and societal expectations and undertook roles as translators, clerics, linguists, and a plethora of others during the war.

== Experiences of Chinese American women ==
Before World War II, Chinese American women were faced with significant racial and gender barriers that limited their job opportunities within the ethnic enclaves like Chinatown. Most women worked in low paying jobs such as garment factories, laundromats, or family-owned businesses, often under exploitative conditions. These jobs allowed women to contribute to household income while managing family duties. Immigration restrictions, such as the Chinese Exclusion Act of 1882, created a gender imbalance within Chinese American communities, which further isolated women socially and economically. Despite these obstacles, their roles in small businesses and domestic work were essential for sustaining their communities and laid the foundation for their eventual contribution during World War II as societal attitudes began to shift.

World War II opened up many new opportunities for Chinese American women. Instead of being confined to jobs within Chinatown, women gained employment in industries outside of their community, such as in the defense industry. By 1943, about 500-600 Chinese American women were working in defense including shipyards and factories, which were traditionally male-dominated spaces. This participation reflected a broader social change, as women began to challenge the pre-war stereotypes about race and gender. Additionally, many women joined war bond drives, volunteered with the Red Cross and participated in patriotic fundraising campaigns, to show their patriotic support for both the United States and China in the war.

Despite their contribution, Chinese American women still faced workplace discrimination. Their involvement, however, extended beyond labor. Organizations like the Chinese Women’s New Life Association lead initiative to support both the Chinese in the Second Sino-Japanese War and the American war effort. These efforts included language training, first-aid classes, and public fundraisers, with the proceeds often sent to China to help the soldiers and civilians. Through these activities, Chinese American women not only contributed to the war effort but also fostered greater integration into American society.

== Efforts during the war ==
Women who expressed interest in joining the WAC during the war were often shunned by family members, who viewed doing so as contradicting traditional societal roles. Japanese women were expected to put their families first and adhere to contemporary roles—joining the military was far too often seen as disgraceful, and only for women who had committed questionable acts. The women who dared to challenge traditional societal roles, however, prevailed against the overwhelming sexism that existed in facets of everyday life and made enduring contributions during the war. After entering the WAC, Nisei women went through five weeks of basic training at various training centers—most of them went to Fort Des Moines, Iowa, or Fort Oglethorpe, Georgia. They abided by stringent schedules alongside their classes, such as kitchen patrol or trash collection and mandatory cleanliness of barracks.

The women also had to get accustomed to other aspects of American life, such as waiting in lines for meals which were often served in large portions and high in carbohydrates. Despite these, though, Nisei women joined the Military Intelligence Service (MIS) as translators and interrogators and attended a rigorous six-month study course designed to educate women on the Japanese military language. While the women were naturally expected to know the language, this proved to be otherwise—they were placed in one of three proficiency levels and, throughout the six-month course, tested on their aptitude and ability to transcribe military documents before graduating. Upon graduation, most of the women were assigned to the Pacific Military Intelligence Research Section at Camp Ritchie, Maryland, and worked with Japanese documents to uncover military plans. Following the war, 11 Japanese American WAC’s were relocated to Tokyo under General Douglas MacArthur’s command and worked to rebuild strained relations with war-torn Japan. Other women, however, simply returned to Japan and held positions as civil servants often doing clerical work or serving as typists and translators. Nevertheless, Nisei women left an indelible mark on the war through their different roles—some even went on to become high-ranking lieutenants overseas. While often undepicted in the context of war, these women performed various tasks bravely; if not for them, traditional attitudes and roles of Japanese American women may not have been altered as drastically.

== Notable Asian American women in the military ==
Nieves Fernandez was a Filipino schoolteacher and guerrilla fighter. Fernandez lead a group of guerrilla fighters against the Japanese during the occupation of the Philippines.

Susan Ahn Cuddy was the first Asian American woman to enlist in the U.S. Navy in 1942 as a member of WAVES (Women Accepted for Volunteer Emergency Service). She soon became the Navy’s first female gunnery officer. Cuddy also worked in the Navy’s codebreaking office and as a combat air tactics instructor, training naval personnel before they deployed.

Hazel Ying Lee was a Chinese American pilot during World War II. As only one of two Chinese American pilots in the Women Airforce Service Pilots, Lee survived long working hours, racial stereotyping, and a fall from an aircraft.

Margaret Gee was a third-generation Chinese American was part of the 8% of applicants accepted into WASP and the second of two Chinese American WASPs in World War II. She co-piloted B-17 bombers and trained male pilots, but was denied the opportunity to become a full fledged pilot because she was female. After the war, Maggie returned to University of California at Berkeley to finish her degree in physics. She then worked at the Lawrence Livermore Laboratory helping to design nuclear warheads and the Poseidon missile. She earned military status for her World War II service in 1977.
