= Operation Z (1944) =

Japanese World War II plan for the defense of the Marianas Islands

Operation Z (Note: Some sources call this operation "Operation A", or "Z Plan".) was a defensive plan put into place by the Japanese during World War II to defend the Mariana Islands, and in particular, Saipan.

== Background ==
Early in 1944, the United States military set their eyes on the Marshall Islands after landing on Kwajalein Atoll. To help with the attack, on February 17, 1944, they bombarded Truk, Caroline Islands, due to its proximity to the Marshall Islands. During this bombardment, the Japanese lost 300 aircraft and some 200,000 tons of merchant shipping.

== Defense of Marianas ==
With the impending invasion of the Marianas Islands, Admiral Mineichi Koga, on March 8, sponsored Operation Z as a defense against the American attack. This plan was approved by the Imperial Japanese Navy General Staff with the formal title Combined Fleet Secret Operations Order No. 73. The operation called for the utilization of the approximately 1,055 land-based aircraft remaining in the Marianas, the Caroline Islands, and in western New Guinea. The plan also called on a naval force of around 9 aircraft carriers and their 450 or so aircraft assisting in the defense. The plan was intended to create the Kantai Kessen, one decisive battle that would devastate the American forces and force them to sue for peace.

== Cessation of operation ==
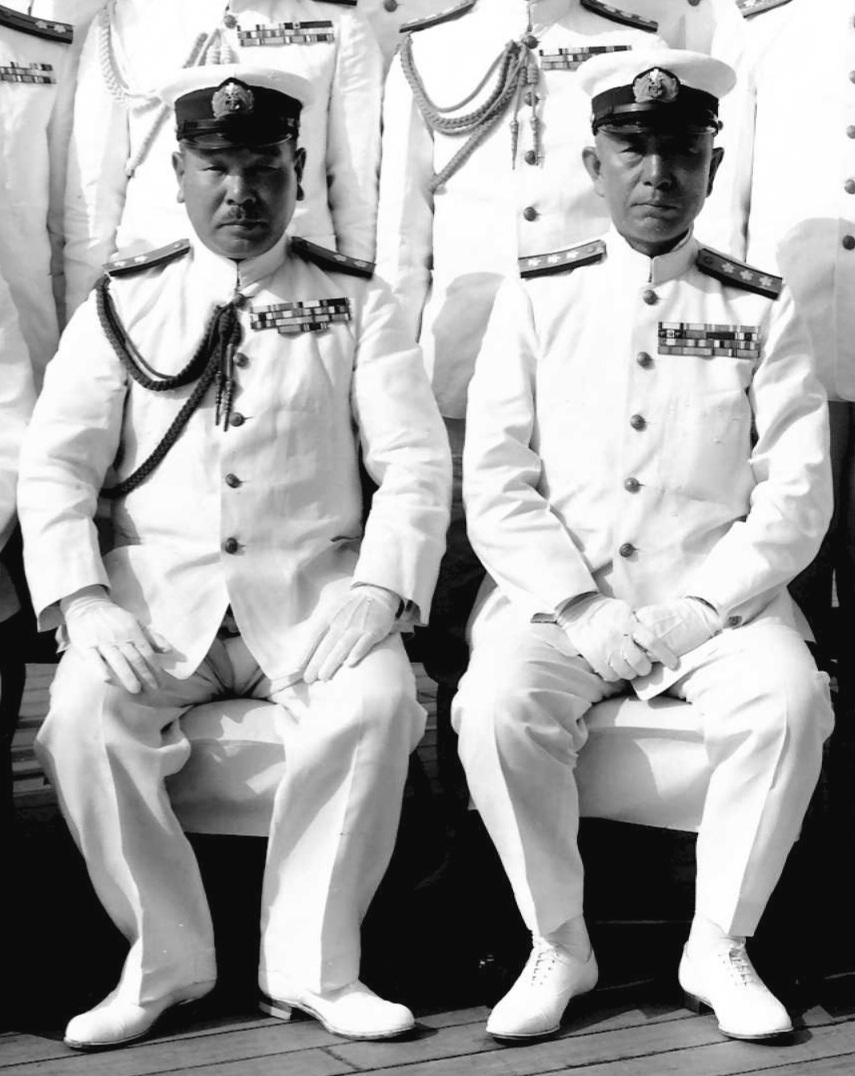
Fukudome and Koga in summer of 1943.

Throughout the spring of 1944, Japanese aircraft losses continued to mount, which was severely endangering the success of the operation. However, the plan's failure was sealed on March 31, 1944, when Mineichi Koga and some of his staff were killed in two separate plane crashes, while the remainder were captured. Among those captured was Shigeru Fukudome, who was in the second plane (not Koga's). After extricating himself from the wreckage, he was able to locate land and began to swim ashore. After spending hours in the ocean, all the while approaching the coastline, he was spotted by some Filipino fishermen and taken prisoner. The documents floated in the water just offshore and were picked up by a shopkeeper with the help of his neighbor. They were turned over to a guerilla and sent to the American forces for analysis. A clandestine high-priority submarine pickup was arranged, with a cover story of evacuating American refugees. The USS Crevalle picked up the documents, along with 40 American men, women and children. Traveling mostly on the surface for speed and diving only when necessary, the submarine survived depth charging twice, arriving near the American naval base in Darwin, Australia, on May 19. From there, the documents were flown to Brisbane.

The Z Plan documents were in plain text, rather than code, and were translated urgently by the top five translators at the Military Intelligence Service attached to the Allied Translator and Interpreter Section, including Yoshikazu Yamada and George "Sankey" Yamashiro, two nisei translators. Copies of the translation were rushed to General Douglas MacArthur, who quickly forwarded them to Admiral Chester Nimitz, commander-in-chief of the Pacific Fleet (and Admiral Koga's counterpart). Among other things, planned Japanese diversionary tactics were now anticipated by the Americans, leading to the lopsided American victory in the Battle of the Philippine Sea, the largest aircraft carrier battle in history, and one of the decisive battles of the Pacific war. After the loss of the plan, Admiral Soemu Toyoda, Koga's successor, rewrote it in a more aggressive version and named it Operation A-Go.
