= Allied Translator and Interpreter Section =

World War II intelligence agency

The Allied Translator and Interpreter Section (ATIS), also known as the Allied Translator and Interpreter Service or Allied Translator and Intelligence Service, was a joint Australian/American World War II intelligence agency which served as a centralized allied intelligence unit for the translation of intercepted Japanese communications, interrogations and negotiations in the Pacific Theater of Operations between September 1942 and December 1945. During the last few months of operation ATIS primarily focused on investigation of Japanese war crimes. The section was officially disbanded on April 30, 1946.

== Formation ==
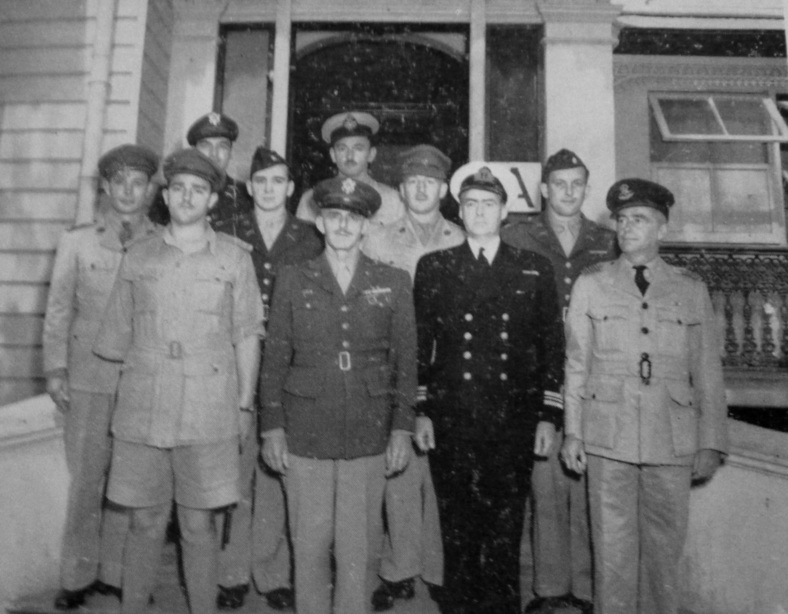
Staff of the Allied Translator and Interpreter Section in 1943. ATIS Coordinator Colonel Sidney Mashbir is front 2nd from the left.

Allied military translation and intelligence efforts in the Pacific primarily operated via attachés and the various offices within the G-2 Intelligence Section until February 1942, when Lieutenant Colonel Sidney Mashbir was re-enlisted to head a new Translator and Interpreter Unit as a part of General Douglas MacArthur's headquarters in the South-West Pacific Area under Major General Charles A. Willoughby commander of the US G-2 Intelligence Section. However, by August 1942, it became apparent to MacArthur that there was need for a greater unified allied intelligence unit, and he instructed that a new section be formed as a "centralized intelligence organization composed primarily of language personnel ... designed to systematize the exploitation of captured documents and the interrogation of prisoners of war", and oversee the collation and distribution of this information to Allied military forces in the South-West Pacific Area.

On September 19, 1942, the Allied Translator and Interpreter Section was formed from the union of US personnel from the Translator and Interpreter Unit, G-2, GHQ, SWPA, which consisted of nine men, with Australia's Combined Services Detailed Interrogation Centre (CSDIC), which consisted of 17 personnel. The Allied Translator and Interpreter Section was an inter-allied, inter-service organisation which began operation at the Advanced Land Headquarters in Indooroopilly, Brisbane, Australia. The ATIS established an advanced unit which moved its base each time the General Headquarters (GHQ SWPA) moved over the course of the war, transferring from Melbourne, Australia, to Hollandia, Dutch New Guinea, then to Leyte Island and Manila in the Philippines, and finally to Tokyo in October 1945 to assist with the occupation campaign.

The Allied Translator and Interpreter Service originally consisted of 25 officers and 10 enlisted men, and grew rapidly along with the scope of its operations. By September 1944, 767 personnel were assigned to ATIS and at its height of operations in 1945 almost 4000 men and women were employed, most of which were second generation Japanese Americans, known as Nisei. From its beginnings ATIS suffered from a lack of qualified translators and language personnel. In September 1942, Life magazine asserted that optimistic estimates were that fewer than 100 non-Japanese Americans could function as linguists, and quoted Archibald MacLeish of the US Office of War Information as stating that there were only 'three Americans with full command of the language' at the time of the attack on Pearl Harbor.

== Operations ==
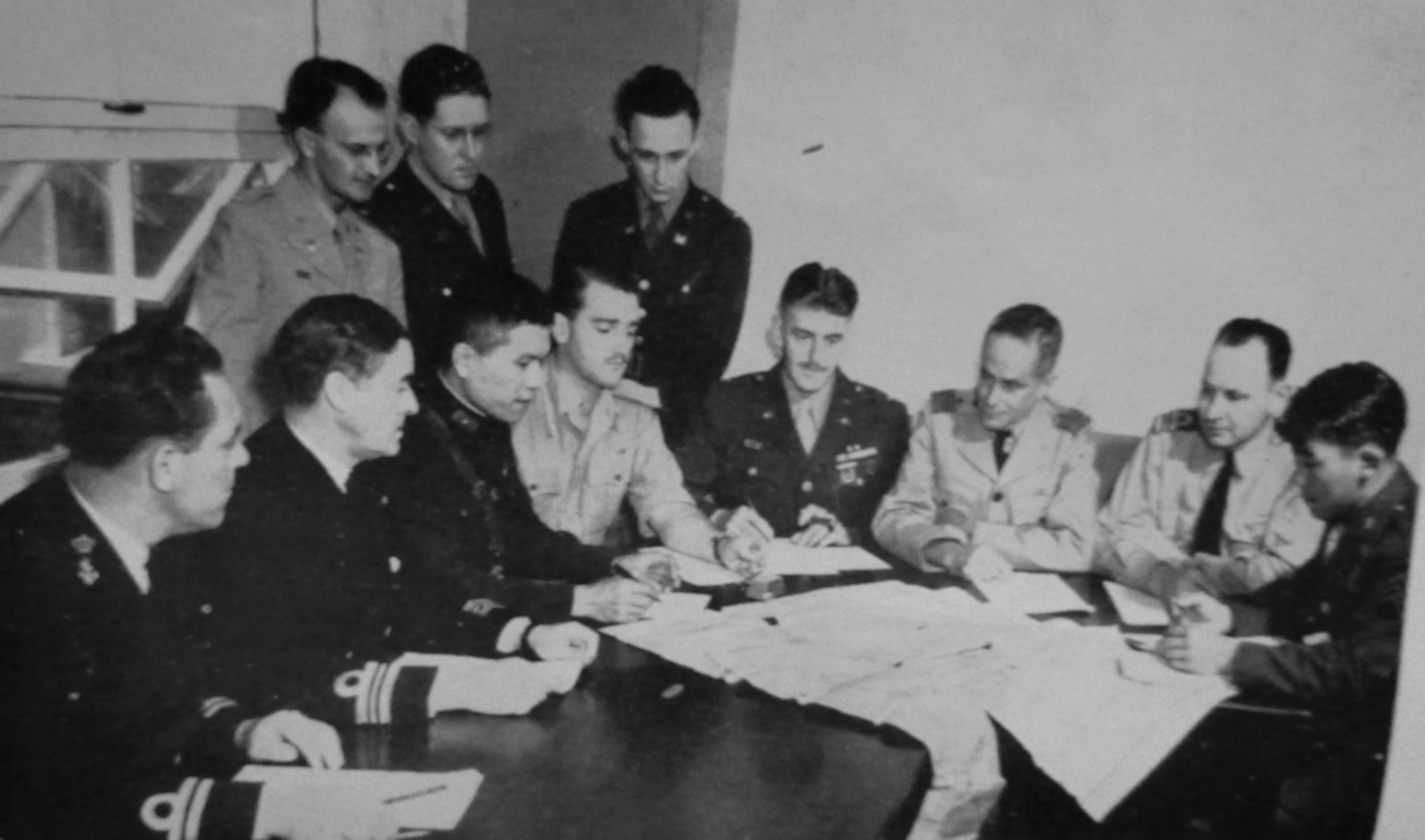
An Allied Translator and Interpreter Section "scanning conference". An American Nisei scans a captured document while Mashbir and representatives of several arms and services (including a Chinese General) look on and listen.

The Allied Translator and Interpreter Section was coordinated by Mashbir as a section of the Military Intelligence Service (MIS).

The Allied Translator and Interpreter Section adhered to three main operating principles:

- All linguist and translation resources in the Pacific Theater would be pooled;
- All allied service and national distinctions would be eliminated;
- All intelligence accumulated would be released simultaneously to all allied services.

The core function of the Allied Translator and Interpreter Section, was to unify and centralize allied intelligence in the South West Pacific Area (SWPA) however the scope of operations soon extended to other pacific areas in cooperation with the Joint Intelligence Center - Pacific Ocean Area (JICPOA) and the South East Asia Translator & Interrogation Center (SEATIC) which also operated in the Pacific Theater. Additionally, the types of operations extended to providing detailed analysis of Japanese military objectives and capabilities, as well as political and psychological interpretations of Japanese military and civilian activities. Later ATIS also played a critical role in Propaganda creation and Psychological warfare.

The Japanese presumed that the Allies would be unable to read the contents of such papers and had taken few security precautions. This fact was vital in the success of decoding intercepted messages, and consequently the effectiveness of ATIS. During the operation of the ATIS, linguists interrogated over 14,000 prisoners; scanned, summarised or translated two million documents; and distributed over 20 million pages of intelligence reports on the Japanese. In its efforts to acquire documents and examine prisoners within moments of their capture, ATIS linguists participated in every Allied assault from Papua to the Philippine Islands, and at least 17 linguists died as a consequence.

=== Nisei Linguists and Operation Z Plan ===
ATIS was established in 1942 by General McArthur in Melbourne, Australia. The agency employed over 3,000 Nisei linguists who were responsible for translating the Z plan as well as over 350,000 captured Japanese documents equivalent to 20.5 million pages of text. "Although a number of testimonials by Nisei linguists show their pride in having proved their loyalty to the U.S., they also discuss their complex feelings about being sent to internment camps by the same government that later took advantage of their language skills in the war against the country of their parents."

The "Z" Plan story begins on the night of March 31 Admiral Koga and Admiral Fukudome boarded two separate planes bound for Davao. Admiral Fukudome was entrusted with a briefcase containing a red leather bound copy of plan "Z". Shortly after their departure, Koga's plane was brought down by a tropical storm killing all on board. Fukudome's plane survived the storm but was forced to use most of its fuel supplies managing headwinds. Fukudome's plane was now on course to Cebu island six miles away but the pilot misjudged the landing and settled into the Bohol Strait 2.5 miles from shore. As the plane began to sink Fukudome and 12 other survivors managed to free themselves from the wreckage now engulfed in flames. On the morning of April 3, Filipino Pedro Gantuangoko, spotted an oil-covered box and discovered the red leather portfolio containing "Z" plan floating offshore. Gantuangoko recovered the strange artifact and buried it believing its contents were of great importance. Meanwhile, Fukudome and the Japanese survivors were rescued and subsequently capture by a group of Filipinos who thus journeyed into the hills above San Fernando reaching a rest area and a guerrilla aid station near Caloctogan home of Cebu Area Command led by U.S. Avery Lt. Col. James M. Cushing. Cushing had been informed by intelligence in D.C., who had decoded Japanese communication, that the Japanese were desperately searching for contents lost in the plane accidents. The next day Cebu Area Command returned to the village and conducted interrogations in hopes of uncovering the missing box. Meanwhile, Gantuangoko relinquished the box containing "Z" plan to local guerillas who forwarded the finding to Cushing. Z Plan was recovered and immediately rushed to ATIS in Australia. Once translated by ATIS, "Z" plan was distributed to every command in the U.S. Navy.

=== Achievements ===
Several notable events occurred during the operation of the Allied Translator and Interpreter Section, including the translation and analysis of the captured Z-Plan in 1944, which outlined Japan's defensive plans against Allied attacks on its Pacific territory, such as the Mariana Islands in the north west Pacific. The United States wanted to capture these islands for use as a bombing base to raid the Japanese mainland. The Z-Plan also contained a strategy for engaging the Allied forces in a decisive battle.

== See also ==
- Japanese prisoners of war in World War II
- Military Intelligence Division
- Military Intelligence Service
- Sidney Mashbir
- Z Plan (Japan)
