= Joseph Stilwell =

United States Army general (1883–1946)

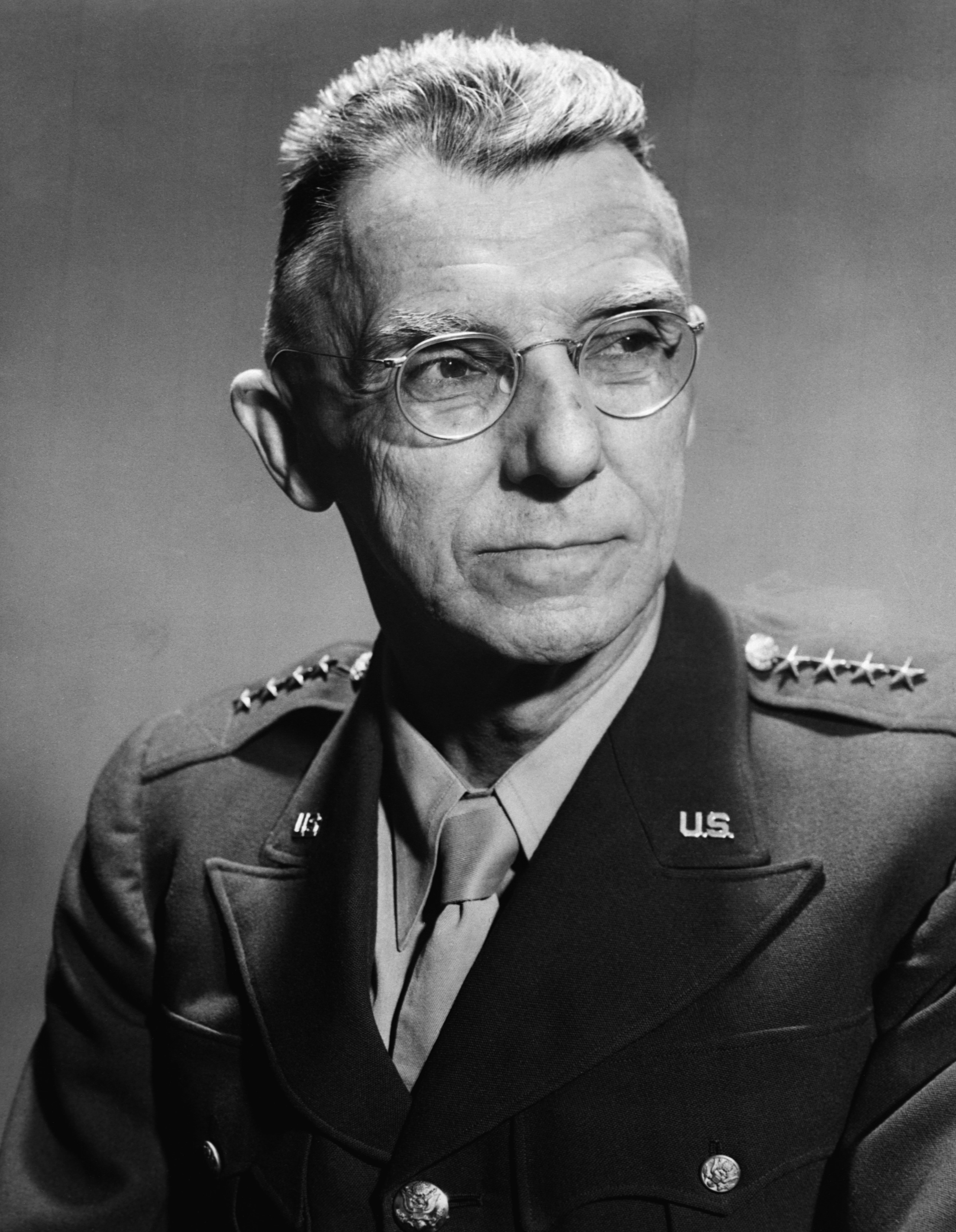
- Born: 19 March 1883; Palatka, Florida, US
- Died: 12 October 1946 (aged 63); San Francisco, California, US
- Children: 5, including Joseph Jr.
- Military career
- Allegiance: United States
- Branch: United States Army
- Service years: 1904–1946
- Rank: General
- Nicknames: "Vinegar Joe", "Uncle Joe", "Stitch"
- Service number: 0-1912
- Unit: Infantry Branch
- Commands: 7th Infantry Division; III Corps; China Burma India Theater; Chinese Expeditionary Force (Burma); Chinese Army in India; Northern Combat Area Command; Army Ground Forces; Tenth United States Army; Sixth United States Army; Western Defense Command
- Conflicts: Philippine–American War; World War I; Battle of Saint-Mihiel; World War II; Second Sino-Japanese War; Burma campaign; Battle of the Yunnan–Burma Road; Battle of Northern Burma and Western Yunnan; Battle of Alcatraz
- Awards: Distinguished Service Cross; Army Distinguished Service Medal (2); Legion of Merit; Bronze Star Medal
- Other work: Chief of Staff to Generalissimo Chiang Kai-shek

Joseph Warren Stilwell (19 March 1883 – 12 October 1946) was a United States Army general who served in the China Burma India theater during World War II. Stilwell served as commander of the US forces in the theater, and also as deputy for both Lord Louis Mountbatten, and Chiang Kai-shek, the Chinese Nationalist leader.

After being defeated by the Japanese in 1942, Stilwell became an early American popular hero of the war for leading a column walking out of Burma on foot. Stilwell's command was marred by disputes with Chiang Kai-shek, Air Force commander Claire Chennault, and British commanders. Stilwell saw Chinese Nationalist forces as corrupt and believed that Chiang was keeping Lend-Lease supplies to fight the Chinese Communist Party, while Chiang regarded Stilwell as reckless, insubordinate, and responsible for heavy Chinese losses under his command. Following the Chinese defeat to a major Japanese offensive in 1944, Stilwell appealed directly to President Roosevelt for support, and delivered to Chiang Roosevelt's message, which threatened that Lend-Lease aid to China would be cut off if Stilwell was not appointed in full command of all Chinese forces. Chiang rejected the ultimatum, seeing it as an affront to China's independence, and with backing of ambassador Patrick J. Hurley demanded Stilwell's replacement, which happened in October 1944.

Stilwell's implacable demands for units debilitated by disease to be sent into heavy combat resulted in Merrill's Marauders, the only American ground unit present in his theater, becoming disenchanted with him. Marauders were disbanded after suffering extremely heavy casualties in the siege of Myitkyina.

Influential voices such as the journalist Brooks Atkinson viewed the Communists as an effective military force and Stilwell as a victim of a corrupt regime. Stilwell's admirers saw him as having been given inadequate resources and incompatible objectives. Critics viewed him as a hard-charging officer whose temperament and conduct towards Chiang contributed to the loss of China.

== Early life and education ==
Stilwell was born on 19 March 1883, in Palatka, Florida. His parents were Doctor Benjamin Stilwell and Mary A. Peene. Stilwell was an eighth-generation descendant of an English colonist who had arrived in America in 1638 and whose descendants remained in New York until the birth of Stilwell's father. Named for a family friend and the doctor who delivered him, Stilwell, known as Warren by his family, grew up in Yonkers, New York, under a strict regimen from his father that included an emphasis on religion. Stilwell later admitted to his daughter that he picked up criminal instincts by "being forced to go to Church and Sunday School, and seeing how little real good religion does anybody, I advise passing them all up and using common sense instead."

Stilwell's rebellious attitude led him to a record of unruly behavior once he reached a postgraduate level at Yonkers High School. Prior to his last year, Stilwell had performed meticulously in his classes and had participated in football (as quarterback) and track. Under the discretion of his father, Stilwell was then placed into a postgraduate course and immediately formed a group of friends whose activities ranged from card playing to stealing the desserts from the senior dance in 1900. The last event in which an administrator was punched led to the expulsions and suspensions for Stilwell's friends. Meanwhile, since he had already graduated, Stilwell was once again by his father's guidance sent to attend the US Military Academy at West Point, rather than Yale University, as had been originally planned.

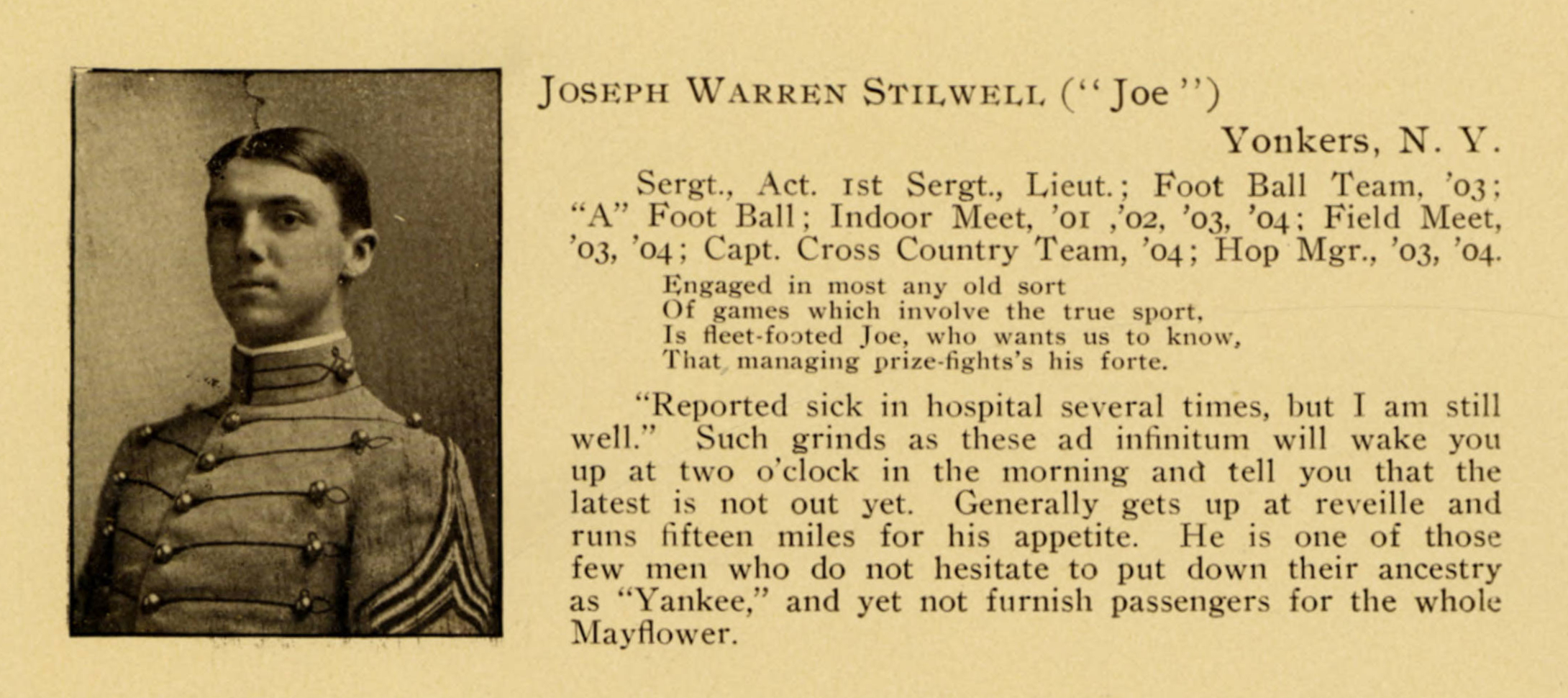
Stilwell in the United States Military Academy yearbook, 1904

Despite missing the deadline to apply for congressional appointment to the military academy, Stilwell gained entry through the use of family connections, via which US president William McKinley was approached. In his first year, Stilwell underwent hazing as a plebe which he referred to as "hell." At West Point, Stilwell showed an aptitude for languages such as French in which he ranked first in his class during his second year. In sports, Stilwell is credited with introducing basketball to the academy, participating in cross-country running as captain, and playing on the varsity football team. At West Point, he had two demerits for laughing during drill. Ultimately, Stilwell graduated with the class of 1904 and ranked 32nd out 124 cadets.

In 1910, he married Winifred Alison Smith (1889–1972). They were the parents of five children, including Brigadier General Joseph Stilwell Jr. (West Point 1933), who served in World War II, the Korean War, and the Vietnam War.

== Early military career ==
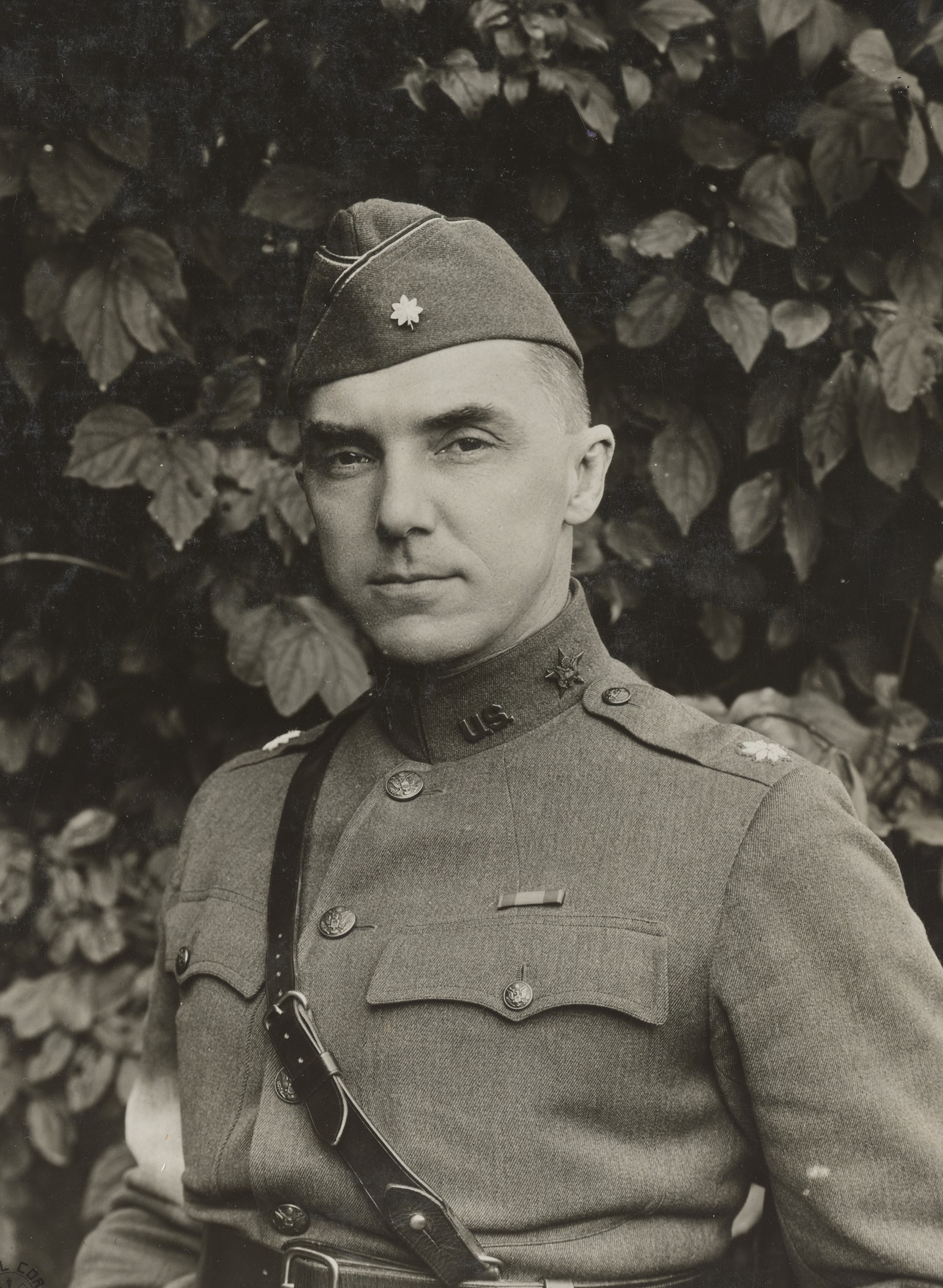
Then-Lt. Col. Stilwell as Assistant Chief of Staff, IV Army Corps, October 1918 in France

Stilwell later taught at West Point and attended the Infantry Advanced Course and the Command and General Staff College. During World War I, he was the Fourth Corps intelligence officer and helped plan the St. Mihiel Offensive. He was awarded the Army Distinguished Service Medal for his service in France, the medal's citation reading as follows:

The President of the United States of America, authorized by Act of Congress, 9 July 1918, takes pleasure in presenting the Army Distinguished Service Medal to Lieutenant Colonel (Infantry) Joseph Warren Stilwell (ASN: 0-1912), United States Army, for exceptionally meritorious and distinguished services to the Government of the United States, in a duty of great responsibility during World War I. As Assistant Chief of Staff, G-2, 4th Army Corps, during the St. Mihiel offensive, and later during the operations in the Woevre, Lieutenant Colonel Stilwell displayed military attainments of a high order. With great energy and zeal he pursued the developments of the enemy activities on the corps front, securing invaluable information which assisted in a marked degree to the planning of the operations. He contributed by the excellent performance of his task to the success of the operations.

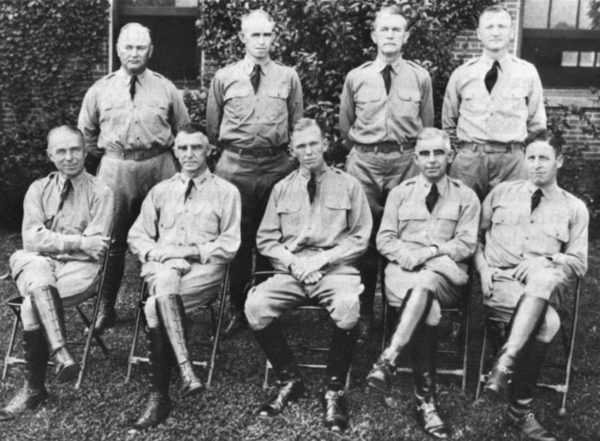
Stilwell (front row, second on the left) as an instructor at the Infantry School in the 1930s. The school's assistant commandant, Lieutenant Colonel George C. Marshall, is sat in the center of the front row, to the right of Stilwell.

Stilwell is often remembered by his sobriquet, "Vinegar Joe," which he acquired as a commander at Fort Benning, Georgia. Stilwell often gave harsh critiques of performance in field exercises, and a subordinate, stung by the caustic remarks, drew a caricature of Stilwell rising out of a vinegar bottle. After discovering the caricature, Stilwell pinned it to a board and had the drawing photographed and distributed to friends. Yet another indication of his view of life was the motto he kept on his desk: Illegitimi non carborundum, a form of fractured Latin that translates as "Don't let the bastards grind you down."

== World War II ==
Between the wars, Stilwell served three tours in China, where he mastered spoken and written Chinese and was the military attaché at the US legation in Beijing from 1935 to 1939. In 1939 and 1940 he was assistant commander of the 2nd Infantry Division and from 1940 to 1941 organized and trained the 7th Infantry Division at Fort Ord, California. It was there that his leadership style which emphasized concern for the average soldier and minimized ceremonies and officious discipline, earned him the nickname of "Uncle Joe."

Just prior to the United States entering World War II, following the Imperial Japanese attack on Pearl Harbor, Stilwell had been recognized as the Army's top corps commander, and he was initially selected to plan and command the Allied invasion of North Africa. However, he and the U.S. Joint Chiefs of Staff were skeptical about the operation and believed military planners underestimated the risk of submarine attacks interfering with the amphibious landings. He also believed that Allied military planners were too lenient towards Francoist Spain and underestimated the risk of it joining the Axis powers, writing "The Boches own the country. Franco must pay the bill for his war." After Stilwell prepared a scathingly anti-British final report on the Arcadia Conference, his superiors decided to reassign him. When it became necessary to send a senior officer to China to keep it in the war, Stilwell was selected, over his own personal objections, by US president Franklin Roosevelt and his old friend, Army Chief of Staff George Marshall.

Stilwell became the chief of staff to Generalissimo Chiang Kai-shek, served as US commander in the China Burma India Theater, was responsible for all Lend-Lease supplies going to China, and later became deputy commander of South East Asia Command. Despite his status and position in China, he became involved in conflicts with other senior Allied officers over the distribution of lend-lease materiel, Chinese political sectarianism and proposals to incorporate Chinese and US forces in the 11th Army Group under British command.

=== Burma retreat and offensive ===
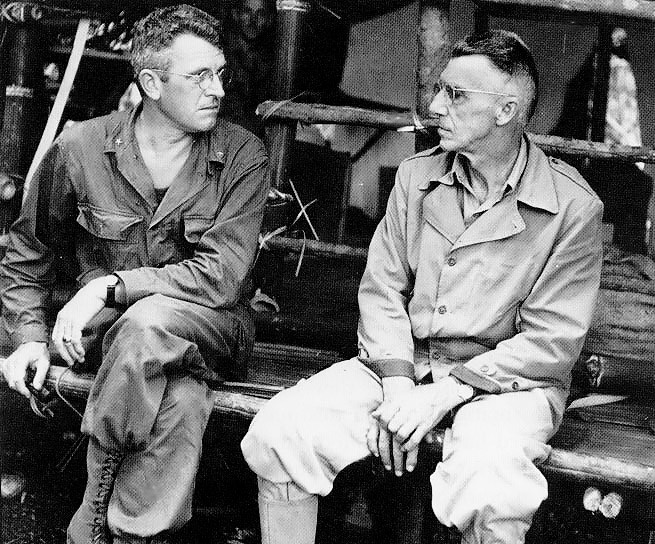
Gen. Frank Merrill (left) with Stilwell in Burma

In February 1942 Stilwell was promoted to lieutenant general and was assigned to the China-Burma-India Theater (CBI), where Stilwell had three major roles: commander of all US forces in China, Burma, and India; deputy commander of the Burma-India Theater under Admiral Louis Mountbatten; and military advisor to Generalissimo Chiang Kai-shek, the commander of all Nationalist Chinese forces as well as commander of the Chinese Theater.

The CBI was a geographical administrative command on the same level as the commands of Dwight Eisenhower and Douglas MacArthur, but unlike other combat theaters like the European Theater of Operations, the CBI was never formally designated a "theater of operations" and did not report to an overall American commander. The China Theater came under the operational command of Chiang, the commander of the National Revolutionary Army, and the Burma India Theater came under the operational command of the British (first GHQ India and later the Allied South East Asia Command whose supreme commander was Mountbatten). During his tenure, there were hardly any American combat forces in the theater, and Stilwell commanded Chinese troops almost exclusively.

The British and the Chinese were ill-equipped and the targets of Japanese offensives. Chiang was interested in conserving his troops and Allied lend-lease supplies to be used against any sudden Japanese offensive and against Communist forces in a later civil war. His wariness increased after he had observed the disastrous Allied performance during the Japanese invasion of Burma. After fighting and resisting the Japanese for five years, many in the Nationalist government felt that it was time for the Allies to assume a greater burden in fighting the war.

The Chinese and American commands were beset by a difference in strategies. Chiang, having fought against Japan since 1937, favored "defense in depth", an approach partially adopted by the British later in 1944. During the early stages of the conflict both the British and the Americans underestimated the Japanese. Captain Evans Carlson, after observing the Battle of Shanghai in 1937, called the Imperial Japanese Army "third rate", while Stilwell wanted to go on the offensive to save Burma. The Japanese divisions there were proficient in both jungle and offroad warfare. They successfully outmaneuvred the road-bound British, coordinated with air support, and exploited local anticolonial sentiments.

The situation was not helped by miscommunication and insubordination. In February 1942, while retreating across the Sittaung River, the main British force left two brigades on the wrong side after prematurely blowing up the bridge. During an ambush against incoming Japanese at Pyinmana, only the Chinese 5th Army stayed in position. The British pulled back, fearing encirclement, while the Chinese 200th Division refused to rush in.

The first step for Stilwell was the reformation of the Chinese Army. The reforms clashed with the delicate balance of political and military alliances in China, which kept Chiang in power. Reforming the army meant removing men who maintained Chiang's position as commander-in-chief. Chiang gave Stilwell technical overall command of some Chinese troops but worried that the new US-led forces would become yet another independent force outside of his control. Since 1942, members of his staff had continually objected to Chinese troops being used in Burma for what they viewed as returning the country to British colonial control.

Chiang therefore sided with Major General Claire Chennault's proposals for the war against the Japanese to be continued largely using existing Chinese forces supported by air forces, which Chennault assured Chiang to be feasible. The dilemma forced Chennault and Stilwell into competition for the valuable lend-lease supplies arriving over the Himalayas from British-controlled India, an obstacle referred to as "The Hump."

George Marshall's biennial report covering 1 July 1943 to 30 June 1945, acknowledged that he had given Stilwell "one of the most difficult" assignments of any theater commander.

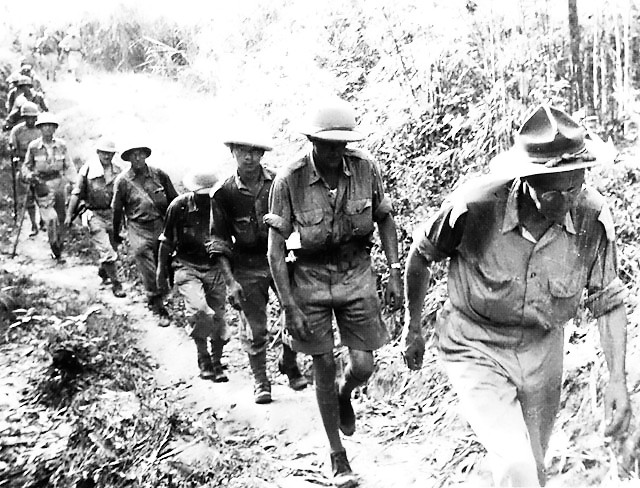
Stilwell marches out of Burma, May 1942

After the collapse of the Allied defenses in Burma cut China off from the remaining supply route, Stilwell declined an airlift offer from General Chennault and led his staff of 117 out of Burma into Assam, India, on foot. They marched at what his men called the "Stilwell stride" of 105 paces per minute. Two of the men accompanying him, his aide Frank Dorn and the war correspondent Jack Belden, wrote about their experiences in Walkout with Stilwell in Burma (1971) and Retreat with Stilwell (1943) respectively. The Assam route was used by other retreating Allied and Chinese forces.

Stilwell's walkout separated him from the approximately 100,000 Chinese troops still there. 25 thousand of them would later perish during their retreat due to the harsh jungle conditions, poor logistics, and Japanese military operations.

In India, Stilwell soon became well known for his no-nonsense demeanor and his disregard for military pomp and ceremony. His trademarks were a battered Army campaign hat, GI shoes, and a plain service uniform with no insignia of rank. He frequently carried a Model 1903, .30–06 Caliber, Springfield rifle in preference to a sidearm. His hazardous march out of Burma and his bluntly honest assessment of the disaster captured the imagination of the American public: "I claim we got a hell of a beating. We got run out of Burma and it is humiliating as hell. I think we ought to find out what caused it, go back and retake it." Stilwell's derogatory remarks on Limey forces, however, did not sit well with British and Commonwealth commanders.

After the Japanese occupied Burma, China was almost completely cut off from Allied aid and materiel except through the hazardous air route over the Hump. Early on, Roosevelt and the US War Department had given priority to other theaters for US combat forces, equipment, and logistical support. The closure of the Burma Road and the fall of Burma made it extremely difficult to replace Chinese war losses. This jeopardized the Allies' initial strategy, which was to maintain the Chinese resistance to the Japanese by providing logistical and air support.

In August 1942, Stilwell opened a training center in Ramgarh, India, 200 miles (320 km) west of Calcutta, to train Chinese troops which had retreated to Assam from Burma. Stilwell's decision to establish the center at Ramgarh met with opposition from several senior British commanders, including Wavell, primarily due to logistical reasons. Chinese soldiers at the center received medical care along with new weapons and uniforms and were trained how to operate artillery, Universal Carriers, and M3 Stuart tanks. By the end of December 1942, 32,000 Chinese troops were being trained at the center to create the 22nd and 38th Divisions along with three artillery regiments and a tank battalion. From the outset, Stilwell's primary goals were the opening of a land route to China from northern Burma and India by means of a ground offensive in northern Burma to allow more supplies to be transported to China and to organize, equip, and train a reorganized and competent Chinese army that would fight the Japanese in the China-Burma-India theater (CBI). Stilwell argued that the CBI was the only area with the possibility for the Allies to engage large numbers of troops against their common enemy, Japan. Unfortunately, the huge airborne logistical train of support from the US to British India was still being organized, and supplies being flown over the Hump were barely sufficient to maintain Chennault's air operations and replace some of the Chinese war losses, let alone equip and supply an entire army.

Additionally, critical supplies intended for the CBI were being diverted to other combat theaters. Some Chinese and American soldiers diverted the supplies that made it over the Hump to the black market for their personal enrichment. As a result, most Allied commanders in India, with the exception of General Orde Wingate and his Chindit operations, focused on defensive measures.

=== Disagreements with Chiang and British ===
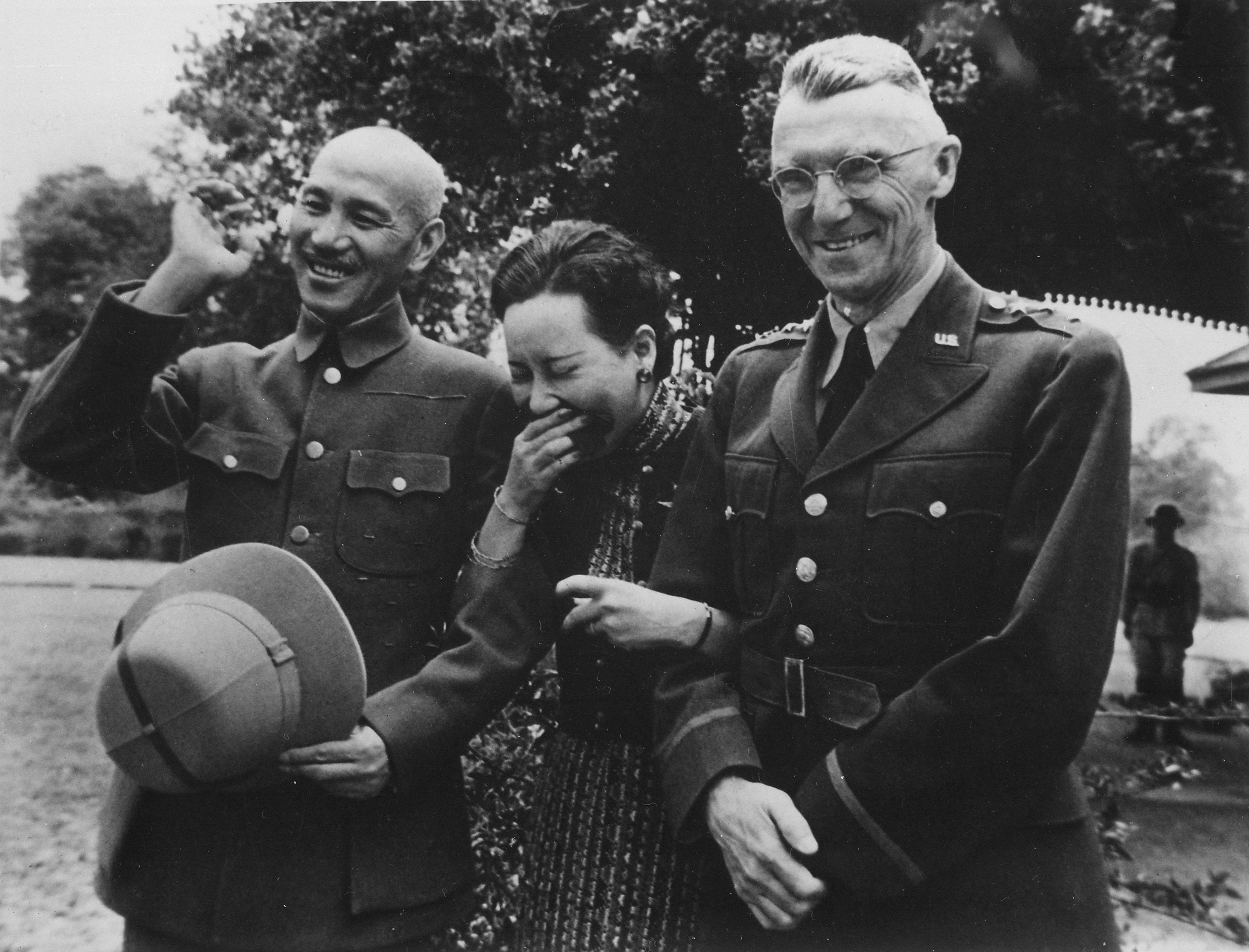
Stilwell sharing a laugh with Generalissimo Chiang Kai-shek and Soong Mei-ling, 1942

Stilwell left the defeated Chinese troops, and escaped Burma in 1942. Chiang had given him nominal command of these troops, though Chinese generals later admitted that they had considered Stilwell as an "adviser" and sometimes took orders directly from Chiang. Chiang was outraged by what he saw as Stilwell's blatant abandonment of the 200th Division, his best army, without orders and began to question Stilwell's capability and judgment as a military commander.

Chiang was also infuriated at Stilwell's strict control of US lend lease supplies to China. Instead of confronting Stilwell or communicating his concerns to Marshall and Roosevelt when they asked Chiang to assess Stilwell's leadership after the Allied disaster in Burma, Chiang reiterated his "full confidence and trust" in Stilwell but countermanded some of the orders to Chinese units issued by Stilwell in his capacity as Chief of Staff.

An outraged Stilwell began to call Chiang "the little dummy" or "Peanut" in his reports to Washington, "Peanut" being originally intended as a code word for Chiang in official radio messages. On the contrary, the term "Peanut" was first mentioned during Stilwell's flight to the CBI Theater in March 1942. Col. Willard Wyman, a member of Stilwell's staff on that flight mentioned Chiang "...is like a peanut perched on top of a dung heap...". Chiang repeatedly expressed his pent-up grievances against Stilwell for his "recklessness, insubordination, contempt, and arrogance" to U.S. envoys to China and was angry at his obsession with going on the offensive in Burma when East China was falling into Japan's hands.

Stilwell was infuriated by the rampant corruption of Chiang's regime. Stilwell faithfully kept a diary in which he began to note the corruption and the amount of money ($380,584,000 in 1944 dollars) being wasted on the procrastinating Chiang and his government. The Cambridge History of China, for instance, estimates that 60%–70% of Chiang's Nationalist conscripts did not make it through their basic training, with 40% deserting and the remaining 20% dying of starvation before their full induction into the military. Eventually, Stilwell's belief that Chiang's and his generals were incompetent and corrupt reached such proportions that Stilwell sought to cut off lend-lease aid to China. Stilwell, while attending the Cairo Conference, received a perceived and verbal order to plan an assassination of Chiang. Stilwell discussed this with his Aide, Col. Frank Dorn. Both were baffled, nevertheless, Stilwell delegated that task to Dorn. It was planned but was never carried out.

Stilwell pressed Chiang and the British to take immediate actions to retake Burma, but Chiang demanded impossibly large amounts of supplies before he would agree to take offensive action, and the British refused to meet their previous pledges to provide naval and ground troops because of Churchill's "Europe first" strategy.

Eventually, Stilwell began to complain openly to Roosevelt that Chiang was hoarding U.S. Lend-Lease supplies because he wanted to keep the Nationalist forces ready to fight Mao Zedong's Communists after the end of the war against the Japanese. From 1942 to 1944, however, 98% of US military aid over the Hump had gone directly to the 14th Air Force and US military personnel in China.

Stilwell also continually clashed with Field Marshal Archibald Wavell and apparently came to believe that the British in India were more concerned with protecting their colonial possessions than helping the Chinese fight the Japanese. In August 1943, as a result of constant feuding and conflicting objectives of British, American, and Chinese commands, along with the lack of a coherent strategic vision for the China Burma India (CBI) theater, the Combined Chiefs of Staff split the CBI command into separate Chinese and Southeast Asia Theaters.

Stilwell countered Mountbatten's January 1944 attempt to once again change the plans to favor an amphibious assault in the Bay of Bengal and Sumatra. "The limeys are welshing," he wrote in his diary and of the plan that seemed to him as nothing more than "fancy charts, false figures and dirty intentions". He sent Brigadier General Boatner to brief the Joint Staffs and Roosevelt.

"Whatever the fiasco, aplomb is unbroken. Mistakes, failures, stupidities and other causes of disaster mysteriously vanish. Disasters are recorded with care and pride and become transmuted into things of beauty. Official histories record every move in monumental and infinite detail but the details serve to obscure."

— Barbara Tuchman, on official British accounts of World War II in Burma

=== Command of Chindits ===
During his time in India, Stilwell became increasingly disenchanted with British forces and did not hesitate to voice criticisms of what he viewed as hesitant or cowardly behavior. Of the Chindit casualties, 90% were incurred in the last phase of the campaign from 17 May, while they were under Stilwell's direct command. The British viewed the situation quite differently and pointed out that from 6 to 27 June, Michael Calvert's 77th Brigade, which lacked heavy weapons, had taken Mogaung and suffered 800 casualties (50%) among those of the brigade involved in the operation.

Stilwell infuriated Calvert and the British by announcing via the BBC that Chinese troops had captured Mogaung but not referring to the British. The Chindits were outraged, and Calvert famously signaled to Stilwell's headquarters, "Chinese reported taking Mogaung. My Brigade now taking umbrage." Stilwell's son was an intelligence officer and said that Umbrage was so small that he could not find it on the map.

Stilwell expected the 77th Brigade to join the siege of Myitkyina, but Calvert was so sickened by demands on his troops that he considered abusive that switched off his radios and withdrew to Stilwell's base. A court-martial was likely until Stilwell and Calvert met in person, the latter being ready to trade punches. Stilwell finally appreciated the conditions under which the Chindits had been operating, apologized by blaming his staff officers for not receiving correct information, and allowed him and his men to withdraw. He finally said to Calvert, "You and your boys have done a great job. I congratulate you". Stilwell also awarded number of medals including a Silver Star.

The 111th Brigade, after it rested, had orders to capture a hill known as Point 2171. That occurred, but the men were now utterly exhausted. Most of them were suffering from malaria, dysentery, and malnutrition. On 8 July, at the insistence of Mountbatten, doctors examined the brigade. Of the 2200 men present from four-and-a-half battalions, only 119 were declared fit. The brigade was evacuated. John Masters kept the fit men, sarcastically named "111 Company," in the field until 1 August.

The portion of 111 Brigade east of the Irrawaddy River was known as Morris Force, after its commander, Lieutenant-Colonel "Jumbo" Morris. It had spent several months harassing Japanese traffic from Bhamo to Myitkyina. It had then attempted to complete the encirclement of Myitkyina. Stilwell was angered that it was unable to do so, but Slim pointed out that Stilwell's Chinese 5,500 troops had also failed in that task. By 14 July, Morris Force was down to three platoons. A week later, it had only 25 men fit for duty. Morris Force was evacuated about the same time as 77th Brigade.

Captain Charlton Ogburn, Jr., a US Army Marauder officer, and Chindit Brigade Commanders John Masters and Michael Calvert, later recalled Stilwell's appointment of a staff officer specially detailed by him to visit subordinate commands to chastise their officers and men as being "yellow." In October 1943, after the Joint Planning Staff at GHQ India had rejected a plan by Stilwell to fly his Chinese troops to northern Burma, Field Marshal Archibald Wavell, asked whether Stilwell was satisfied on purely military grounds that the plan could not work. Stilwell replied that he was. Wavell then asked what Stilwell would say to Chiang, and Stilwell replied, "I shall tell him the bloody British wouldn't fight."

=== Myitkyina Offensive and aftermath ===
With the establishment of the new South East Asia Command in August 1943, Stilwell was appointed deputy supreme allied commander under Vice Admiral Mountbatten. Taking command of various Chinese and Allied forces, including a new US Army special operations formation, the 5307th Composite Unit (Provisional), later known as Merrill's Marauders, Stilwell built up his Chinese forces for an eventual offensive in northern Burma. On 21 December 1943, Stilwell assumed direct control of planning for the invasion of northern Burma that culminated with the capture of the Japanese-held town of Myitkyina. In the meantime, Stilwell ordered General Frank Merrill and the Marauders to start long-range jungle penetration missions behind Japanese lines after the pattern of the British Chindits. In February 1944, three Marauder battalions marched into Burma. Stilwell was at the Ledo Road front when the Marauders arrived at their jump-off point, but the general did not walk out to the road to bid them farewell.

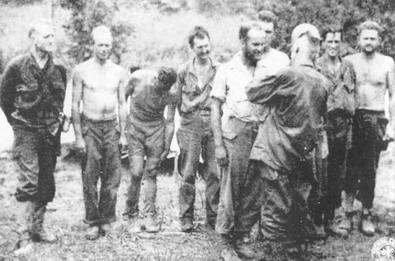
Stilwell awarding medals at Myitkyina, 1944

In April 1944, Stilwell launched his final offensive to capture the Burmese city of Myitkyina. In support of that objective, the Marauders were ordered to undertake a long flanking maneuver towards the town that involved a grueling 65-mile jungle march. Having been deployed since February in combat operations in the jungles of Burma, the Marauders were seriously depleted, suffered from both combat losses and disease, and lost additional men en route to the objective. A particularly devastating scourge was a severe outbreak of amoebic dysentery, which erupted shortly after the Marauders linked up with the Chinese Army in India, called X Force.

By then, the men of the Marauders had openly begun to suspect Stilwell's commitment to their welfare and made no effort to hide their displeasure with their hard-driving commander. Despite their sacrifices, Stilwell appeared unconcerned about their losses and had rejected repeated requests for medals for individual acts of heroism. Initial promises of a rest and rotation were ignored, and the Marauders were not even air-dropped replacement uniforms or mail until late April.

On 17 May, the 1,310 remaining Marauders attacked Myitkyina airfield in concert with elements of two Chinese infantry regiments and a small artillery contingent. The airfield was quickly taken, but the town, which Stilwell's intelligence staff had believed to be lightly defended, was garrisoned by significant numbers of well-equipped Japanese troops, who were steadily being reinforced. A preliminary attack on the town by two Chinese regiments was thrown back with heavy losses. The Marauders did not have the manpower to overwhelm Myitkyina and its defenses immediately. When additional Chinese forces had arrived in a position to attack, the Japanese forces totaled some 4,600 fanatical Japanese defenders.

During the siege, which took place during the height of the monsoon season, the Marauders' second-in-command, Colonel Hunter, and the unit's regimental and battalion level surgeons, had urgently recommended for the entire 5307th to be relieved of duty and returned to rear areas for rest and recovery. By then, most of the men had fevers and continual dysentery, forcing the men to cut the seats out of their uniform trousers to fire their weapons and relieve themselves simultaneously. Stilwell rejected the evacuation recommendation but made a front line inspection of the Myitkyina lines. He then ordered all medical staff to stop returning combat troops suffering from disease or illness but to return them to combat status by using medications to keep down fevers. The feelings of many Marauders towards Stilwell were summed up by one soldier, who stated, "I had him [Stilwell] in my sights. I coulda' squeezed one off and no one woulda' known it wasn't a Jap who got that son of a bitch."

Stilwell also ordered that all Marauders evacuated from combat from wounds or fever first submit to a special medical "examination" by doctors appointed by his headquarters staff. These examinations passed many ailing soldiers as fit for duty; Stilwell's staff roamed hospital hallways in search of any Marauder with a temperature lower than 103 degrees Fahrenheit. Some of the men who were passed and sent back into combat were immediately re-evacuated as unfit at the insistence of forward medical personnel. Later, Stilwell's staff placed blame on Army medical personnel for over-zealously interpreting his return-to-duty order.

During the siege, Japanese soldiers resisted fiercely and generally fought to the last man. As a result, Myitkyina did not fall until 4 August 1944, after Stilwell was forced to send in thousands of Chinese reinforcements, but Stilwell was pleased that the objective had at last been taken (his notes from his personal diary contained "Boy, will this burn up the Limeys!"). Later, Stilwell blamed the length of the siege partly on British and Gurkha Chindit forces for not promptly responding to his demands to move north in an attempt to pressure Japanese troops, but the Chindits themselves had suffered grievous casualties in several fierce pitched battles against Japanese troops in the Burmese jungles, along with losses from illness and combat exhaustion. Stilwell also had not kept his British allies clearly informed of his force movements or coordinated his offensive plans with those of General Slim.

Bereft of further combat replacements for his hard-pressed Marauder battalions, Stilwell felt that he had no choice but to continue offensive operations with his existing forces by using the Marauders as "the point of the spear" until they had achieved all their objectives or been wiped out. He was also concerned that pulling out the Marauders, the only US ground unit in the campaign, would result in charges of favoritism and force him to evacuate the exhausted Chinese and British Chindit forces as well. When General William Slim, the commander of the British Commonwealth Fourteenth Army in Burma, informed Stilwell that his men were exhausted and should be withdrawn, Stilwell rejected the idea by insisting that his subordinate commanders simply did not understand enlisted men and their tendency to magnify physical challenges. Having made his own "long march" out of Burma under his own power by using jungle trails, Stilwell found it difficult to sympathize with those who had been in combat in the jungle for months on end without relief. In retrospect, his statements then revealed a lack of understanding of the limitations of lightly equipped unconventional forces that were used in conventional roles.

Myitkyina and the dispute over evacuation policy precipitated a hurried Army Inspector General investigation, followed by US congressional committee hearings, but no disciplinary measure was taken against Stilwell for his decisions as overall commander.

Only a week after the fall of Myitkyina in Burma, the 5307th Marauder force, down to only 130 combat-effective men of the original 2,997, was disbanded.

=== Conflict with Chennault ===
One of the most significant conflicts to emerge during the war was between General Stilwell and General Claire Chennault, the commander of the famed "Flying Tigers" and later air force commander. As adviser to the Republic of China Air Force, Chennault proposed a limited air offensive against the Japanese in China in 1943 by using a series of forward air bases. Stilwell insisted that the idea was untenable and that any air campaign should not begin until fully fortified air bases, supported by large ground forces, had been established. Stilwell then argued for all air resources to be diverted to his forces in India for an early conquest of northern Burma.

In following Chennault's advice, Chiang rejected the proposal, and British commanders sided with Chennault since they were aware that they could not launch a co-ordinated Allied offensive into Burma in 1943 with the resources that were available. During the summer of 1943, Stilwell's headquarters concentrated on plans to rebuild the Chinese Army for an offensive in northern Burma despite Chiang's insistence on support to Chennault's air operations.

Stilwell believed that after forcing a supply route through northern Burma by a ground offensive against the Japanese, he could train and equip 30 Chinese divisions with modern combat equipment. A smaller number of Chinese forces would transfer to India, where two or three new Chinese divisions would also be raised. That plan then remained only theoretical since the limited available airlift capacity for deliveries of supplies to China over the Hump was being used to sustain Chennault's air operations, instead of equipping Chinese ground units.

In 1944, the Japanese launched the counteroffensive, Operation Ichi-Go, designed to knock China out of the war once and for all. It saw half a million men and 800 tanks, supplied by 70,000 to 100,000 horses dragging wagons and 12,000 to 15,000 vehicles. The operation quickly overran Chennault's forward air bases and proved Stilwell to be correct. By then, Allied supply efforts via the Hump airlift were steadily improving in tonnage supplied per month. With the replacement of Chinese war losses, Chennault now saw little need for a ground offensive in northern Burma to reopen a ground supply route to China. Augmented with increased military equipment and additional troops and concerned about defense of the approaches to India, British authorities now sided with Stilwell.

In co-ordination with a southern offensive by Nationalist Chinese forces under General Wei Lihuang, Allied troops under Stilwell's command launched the long-awaited invasion of northern Burma. After heavy fighting and casualties, both forces linked up in January 1945. Stilwell's strategy remained unchanged: opening a new ground supply route from India to China would allow the Allies to equip and train new Chinese army divisions to be used against the Japanese. The new road network, later called the Ledo Road, would link the northern end of the Burma Road as the primary supply route to China. Stilwell's staff planners had estimated the route would supply 65,000 tons of supplies per month.

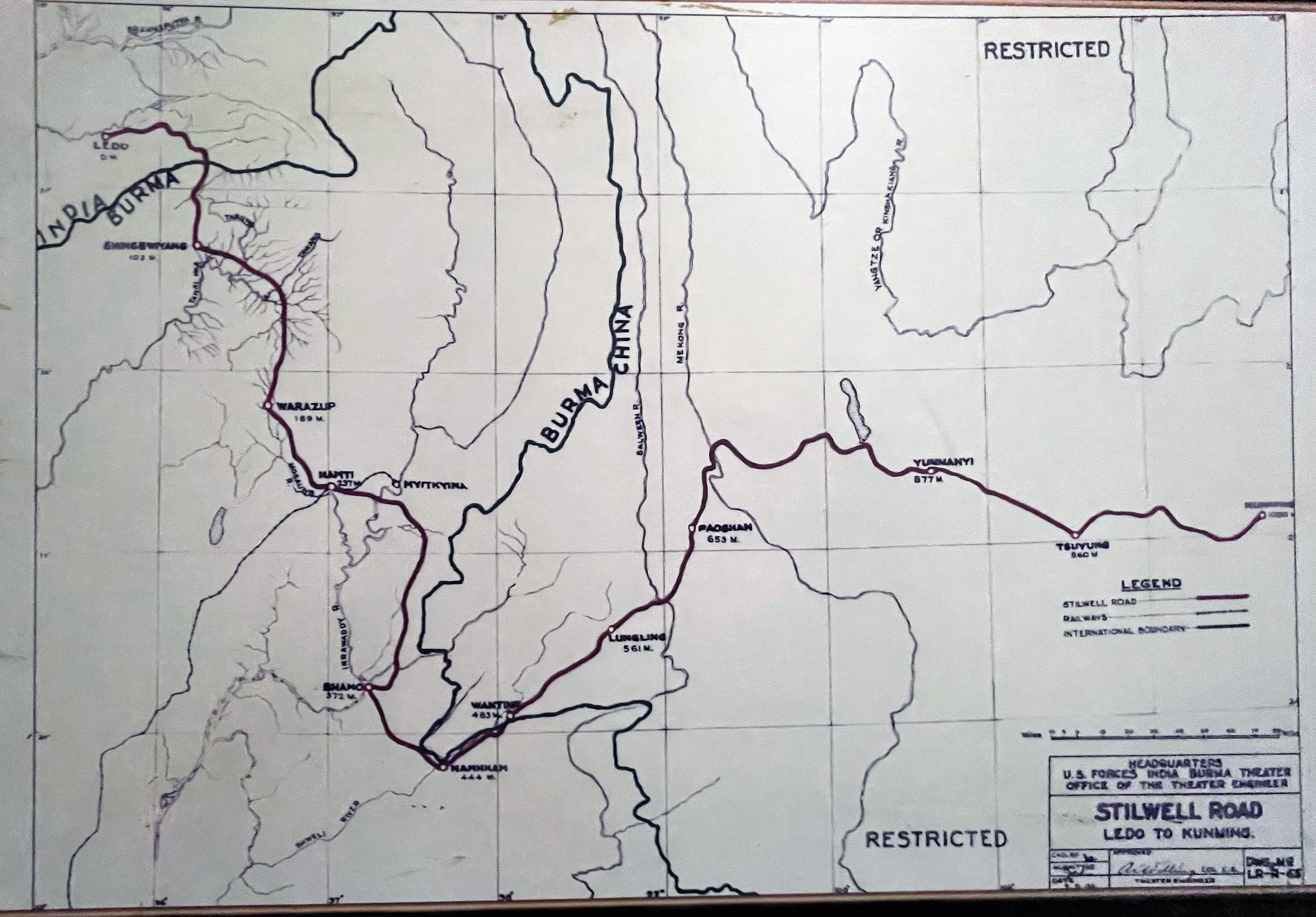
Displayed in the Coal Heritage Park & Museum, Margherita, Assam, map of Ledo Road (later renamed Stilwell Road) approved by the US Forces India Burma theater engineer.

Using those figures, Stilwell argued that the Ledo Road network would greatly surpass the tonnage being airlifted over the Hump. Chennault doubted that such an extended network of trails through difficult jungle could ever match the tonnage that could be delivered with modern cargo transport aircraft that were then being deployed in the theater. Progress on the Ledo Road was slow and could not be completed until the linkup of forces in January 1945.

In the end, Stilwell's plans to train and to modernize 30 Chinese divisions in China and two or three divisions from forces that were already in India was never fully realized. As Chennault predicted, the supplies carried over the Ledo Road never approached in tonnage the levels of supplies airlifted monthly into China by the Hump. In July 1945, 71,000 tons of supplies were flown over the Hump, compared to 6,000 tons using the Ledo Road, and the airlift operation continued in operation until the end of the war.

When supplies were flowing over the Ledo Road in large quantities, operations in other theaters had shaped the course of the war against Japan. Stilwell's drive into northern Burma, however, allowed Air Transport Command to fly supplies into China more quickly and safely by allowing American planes to fly a more southerly route without fear of Japanese fighters. American airplanes no longer had to make the dangerous venture over the Hump, which raised the delivery of supplies from 18,000 tons in June 1944 to 39,000 tons in November 1944. On 1 August 1945, planes crossed the Hump a minute and twelve seconds apart from one another.

In acknowledgment of Stilwell's efforts, the Ledo Road was later renamed the Stilwell Road by Chiang.

=== Recall from China ===
Efforts to counter Operation Ichi-Go were hampered in part by disagreements between Chennault and Stilwell. Stilwell also clashed with Chiang over the question of Guilin, a city that was besieged by the Japanese. Chiang wanted Guilin defended to the last man, but Stilwell claimed that Guilin was a lost cause.

In his diary, Stilwell wrote: "What they ought to do is to shoot the G-mo [Chiang] and Ho [General He Yingqin] and the rest of the gang." He ordered the American troops to pull out of Guilin and managed to persuade a reluctant Chiang to accept the loss of the city. The clash over Guilin was only a prelude to another clash in which Chiang demanded the return of the Y Force from Burma to defend Kunming, the capital of Yunnan Province, which was also being threatened by the Japanese advance. After meeting with Chiang, Stilwell wrote in his diary that Chiang was a "crazy little bastard with that hickory nut he uses for a head.... Usual cockeyed reasons and idiotic tactical and strategic conceptions. He is impossible!"

Stilwell appealed directly to Roosevelt for help with his dispute with Chiang and so Roosevelt sent Chiang a message: "I have urged time and again in recent months that you take drastic action to resist the disaster which has been moving closer to China and to you. Now, when you have not yet placed General Stilwell in command of all forces in China, we are faced with the loss of a critical area... with possible catastrophic consequences." Roosevelt ended his ultimatum to Chiang by the threat to end all American aid unless Chiang "at once" placed Stilwell "in unrestricted command of all your forces."

Chennault later claimed that Stilwell had deliberately ordered Sino-American forces out of Guilin as a way of creating a crisis that would force Chiang to give up command of his armies to Stilwell. Stilwell's diary supported Chennault's claim, as Stilwell wrote that if a crisis emerged that was "just sufficient to get rid of the Peanut without entirely wrecking the ship, it would be worth it." Stilwell went on to write that the entire Nationalist system had to be "torn to bits" and that Chiang would have to go.

I have waited long for vengeance,
At last I've had my chance.
I've looked the Peanut in the eye
And kicked him in the pants.

The old harpoon was ready
With aim and timing true,
I sank it to the handle,
And stung him through and through.

The little bastard shivered,
And lost the power of speech.
His face turned green and quivered
As he struggled not to screech.

For all my weary battles,
For all my hours of woe,
At last I've had my innings
And laid the Peanut low.

I know I've still to suffer,
And run a weary race,
But oh! the blessed pleasure!
I've wrecked the Peanut's face.

— Poem written by Joseph Stilwell in 1944

An exultant Stilwell immediately delivered the letter to Chiang despite pleas from Patrick J. Hurley, Roosevelt's special envoy in China, to delay in delivering the message and to work on a deal that would achieve Stilwell's aim in a way that was more acceptable to Chiang. Stilwell wrote in his diary about handing over Roosevelt's message: "I handed this bundle of paprika to the Peanut and than [sic] sank back with a sigh. The harpoon hit the little bugger right in the solar plexus and went right through him. It was a clean hit, but beyond turning green and losing his powers of speech, he did not bat an eye." The British journalist Jonathan Fenby wrote about Roosevelt's letter, "Unless the President was ready for America to take over effective control of China, or halt Lend-Lease supplies and abandon the KMT to its fate, his stern words merely amounted to bluff."

Seeing that act as a move toward the complete subjugation of China, Chiang gave a formal reply in which he said that Stilwell must be replaced immediately and that Chiang would welcome any other qualified US general to fill Stilwell's position.

Chiang called Roosevelt's letter the "greatest humiliation I have been subjected to in my life" and stated that it was "all too obvious that the United States intends to intervene in China's internal affairs." Chiang told Hurley that the Chinese people were "tired of the insults which Stilwell has seen fit to heap upon them." Chiang delivered a speech before the Central Executive Committee of the Nationalist Party that was leaked to the press and called Roosevelt's letter a form of imperialism and stated that accepting Roosevelt's demands would make him no different from the Japanese collaborator Wang Jingwei in Nanjing.

On 12 October 1944, Hurley reported to Washington that Stilwell was a "fine man, but was incapable of understanding or co-operating with Chiang Kai-shek" and went on to say that if Stilwell remained in command, all of China might be lost to the Japanese. Before sending his cable, Hurley showed it to Stilwell, who accused Hurley to his face of "cutting my throat with a dull knife."

On 19 October 1944, Stilwell, who had been promoted to four-star general on 1 August 1944, was recalled from his command by Roosevelt. Partly as a result of controversy concerning the casualties suffered by US forces in Burma and partly because of the continuing difficulties with the British and Chinese commanders, Stilwell's return to the US was not accompanied by the usual ceremony. Upon arrival, he was met by two army generals at the airport, who told him not to answer any of the media questions about China.

Stilwell was replaced by General Albert C. Wedemeyer, who received a telegram from Marshall on 27 October 1944, that directed him to proceed to China to assume command of the China Theatre and replace Stilwell. Wedemeyer later recalled his initial dread over the assignment, as service in the China Theater was considered to be a graveyard for American officials, both military and diplomatic.

When Wedemeyer actually arrived at Stilwell's headquarters after the latter's dismissal, Wedemeyer was dismayed to discover that Stilwell had intentionally departed without seeing him and had not left a single briefing paper for his guidance. Most other departing US military commanders greeted their replacement to have them thoroughly briefed on the strengths and the weaknesses of headquarters staff, the issues confronting the command, and the planned operations.

Searching the offices, Wedemeyer could find no documentary record of Stilwell's plans or records of his former or future operations. General Wedemeyer then spoke with Stilwell's staff officers but learned little from them because Stilwell, according to the staff, kept everything in his "hip pocket".

== Reassignment ==
After a three-month furlough, Stilwell, on 24 January 1945, assumed command of the Army Ground Forces with its headquarters at the Pentagon and oversaw all mobilization and training of army ground units in the United States.

On 23 June 1945, after the death of Lieutenant General Simon B. Buckner, Jr. on 18 June, Stilwell was appointed as commander of the Tenth United States Army shortly after the end of Japanese resistance in the Battle of Okinawa. The Tenth Army was slated to participate in Operation Olympic, the planned invasion of the island of Honshu, the largest Japanese home island. The Tenth Army was disbanded on 15 October 1945, after the surrender of Japan.

== Postwar career ==
In November, Stilwell was appointed to lead a "War Department Equipment Board" in an investigation of the Army's modernization in light of its recent experience. Among his recommendations was the establishment of a combined arms force to conduct extended service tests of new weapons and equipment and then formulate doctrine for its use, and the abolition of specialized anti-tank units. His most notable recommendation was for a vast improvement of the army's defenses against all airborne threats, including ballistic missiles. In particular, he called for "guided interceptor missiles, dispatched in accordance with electronically computed data obtained from radar detection stations."

On 1 March 1946, Stilwell assumed command of the Sixth US Army, with its headquarters at the Presidio of San Francisco. It had been reorganized as an administrative command in charge of army units in the Western United States. In May 1946, Stilwell and his former subordinate Frank Merrill led two US Marine platoons in suppressing a prison uprising, the Battle of Alcatraz.

== Death ==
Stilwell died after surgery for stomach cancer on 12 October 1946, at the Presidio of San Francisco. He was still on active duty and five months short of reaching the army's mandatory retirement age of 64. He was cremated, his ashes were scattered on the Pacific Ocean, and a cenotaph was placed at the West Point Cemetery. Among his military decorations are the Distinguished Service Cross, Distinguished Service Medal with one Oak Leaf Cluster, the Legion of Merit degree of Commander, the Bronze Star, and the Combat Infantryman Badge; the last award was given to him as he was dying.

== Political and personal views ==
Barbara W. Tuchman recorded that Stilwell was a lifelong Republican: "he retained the family Republicanism and joined naturally in the exhilarating exercise of Roosevelt-hating." Later, on the occasion that Stilwell met the president, she noted: "At home, Stilwell was a conventional Republican who shared the sentiments and adopted the tone of the Roosevelt-haters, in which he was influenced by his brother John, an extremist of the species." Elsewhere she notes that in the view of an unnamed, close friend, "Stilwell was liberal and sympathetic by instinct. But he was conservative in thought and politics."

Tuchman also noted Stilwell's use in letters and diaries of a catalogue of racial epithets: "he used [them] easily and seemingly without pejorative content." These terms included "limeys for the English, frogs for the French ('met a frog and his wife on shipboard'), huns and squareheads for Germans, wops for Italians, chinks or chinos for Chinese, googs for Filipinos, niggers or coons for Negroes." At the end of the war, Tuchman stated that he took "a harsh pleasure in touring the gutted and burned-out districts of Yokohama and staring at the once arrogant [Japanese] now living in shanties of scrap lumber and tin and scratching in the dirt to plant onions."

His diary entry for 1 September 1945 (in Yokohama) stated in part, "What a kick to stare at the arrogant, ugly, moon-faced, buck-toothed, bowlegged bastards, and realize where this puts them. Many newly demobilized soldiers around. Most police salute. People generally just apathetic. We gloated over the destruction & came in at 3:00 am feeling fine."

During World War II, he praised the Soviet military and said that "the Russian troops appeared to advantage, and those who believe the Red Army is rotten would do well to reconsider their views."

The content in Stilwell's diaries is contradicted by his speaking out for Japanese-American servicemen threatened with racist incidents postwar. Because of his statements, Stilwell was recruited by the War Department to support Japanese-American servicemen. He attended rallies against racism and personally presented the family of the 442nd Regimental Combat Team's Staff Sergeant Kazuo Masuda, killed in action in Italy in 1944, with the Distinguished Service Cross. In an event at Santa Ana, California where actors Ronald Reagan and Robert Young also spoke, Stilwell praised Nisei soldiers. He remarked: "Who after all is the real American? The real American is the man who calls it a fair exchange to lay down his life in order that American ideals may go on living. And judging by such a test, Sgt. Masuda was a better American than any of us today." Also in attendance at the event were actress Louise Allbritton, journalist Harry Flannery, former congressman Will Rogers Jr., and actor Richard Loo.

== Legacy ==
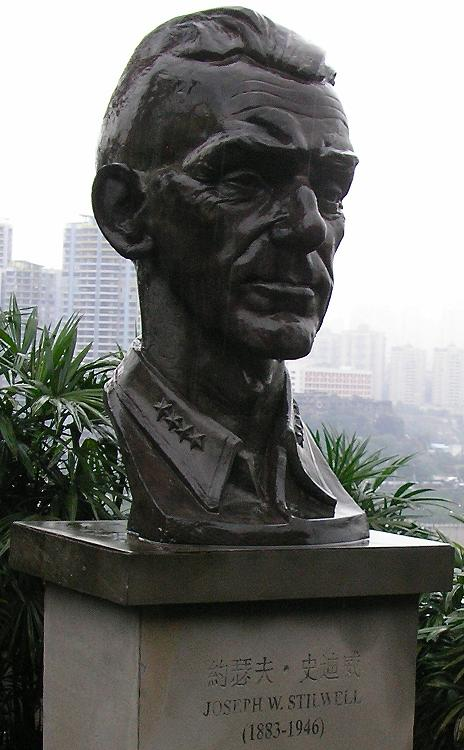
A bust of Stilwell at the "Former Residence of General Stilwell" Museum in Chongqing

In her book Stilwell and the American Experience in China, 1911-45, Tuchman wrote that Stilwell was sacrificed as a political expedient because of his inability to get along with his allies in the theater. Some historians, such as David Halberstam in his final book, The Coldest Winter: America and the Korean War, have theorized that Roosevelt was concerned that Chiang would sign a separate peace with Japan, which would free many Japanese divisions to fight elsewhere, and that Roosevelt wanted to placate Chiang. The power struggle over the China Theater that emerged among Stilwell, Chennault, and Chiang reflected US political divisions of the time.

A very different interpretation of events suggests that Stilwell, pressing for his full command of all Chinese forces, had made diplomatic inroads with the People's Liberation Army commanded by Mao Zedong. Stilwell bypassed Chiang, his theater commander, and had gotten Mao to agree to follow an American commander. Stilwell's confrontational approach in the power struggle with Chiang ultimately led to Chiang's determination to have Stilwell recalled to the US.

According to Guan Zhong, the president of the Examination Yuan, Stilwell had once expressed his regret of never having the opportunity to fight alongside the Chinese Communists, especially with General Zhu De, before his death.

Stilwell did not appreciate the developments in warfare brought about by World War II, including strategic air power and the use of highly trained infantrymen as jungle guerrilla fighters. One of the disagreements was with the equally acerbic General Chennault, who Stilwell felt to overvalue the effectiveness of air power against massed ground troops, as was demonstrated by the fall of the 14th Air Force bases in eastern China (Hengyang, Guilin, etc.) during the Japanese offensive in eastern China in 1944.

Stilwell also clashed with other officers, including Orde Wingate, who led the Chindits, and Colonel Charles Hunter, who was in charge of Merrill's Marauders. Stilwell could not appreciate the toll that constant jungle warfare took on even the most highly trained troops or the incapacity of lightly armed fast-moving jungle guerrilla forces to dislodge heavily armed regular infantry that was supported by artillery. Accordingly, Stilwell abused both Chindits and Marauders and earned the contempt of both units and their commanders.

In other respects, however, Stilwell was a skilled tactician in the US Army's land warfare tradition, with a deep appreciation of the logistics required of campaigning in rough terrain, which caused his dedication to (perhaps even obsession with) the Ledo Road project for which he received several awards, including the Distinguished Service Cross and the US Army Distinguished Service Medal. The trust that Stilwell placed in men of real insight and character in understanding China, particularly the China Hands, John Stewart Service and John Paton Davies, Jr., confirms that assessment.

Arguably, if Stilwell had been given the number of American regular infantry divisions that he had continually requested, the US experience in China and Burma could have been very different. Certainly, his Army peers, General Douglas MacArthur and General George Marshall had the highest respect for his abilities, and both ensured that he replaced General Simon Bolivar Buckner, Jr. as commander of Tenth US Army at Okinawa after the latter's death. During the last year of the war, however, the US was strained to meet all its military obligations. The cargo aircraft diverted to supply Stilwell, the 14th Air Force for the Chinese in the East made airdrop-dependent campaigns in the West, such as Operation Market Garden, woefully short of aircraft, although bad weather during the Arnhem Campaign may have been a more important factor.

Although Chiang succeeded in removing Stilwell, the public relations damage suffered by the Nationalist regime was irreparable. Right before Stilwell's departure, The New York Times drama critic-turned-war correspondent Brooks Atkinson interviewed him in Chongqing and wrote:

The decision to relieve General Stilwell represents the political triumph of a moribund, anti-democratic regime that is more concerned with maintaining its political supremacy than in driving the Japanese out of China. The Chinese Communists... have good armies that are now fighting guerrilla warfare against the Japanese in North China... The Generalissimo regards these armies as the chief threat to his supremacy... has made no sincere attempt to arrange at least a truce with them for the duration of the war... No diplomatic genius could have overcome the Generalissimo's basic unwillingness to risk his armies in battle with the Japanese.

Atkinson, who had visited Mao in Yan'an, saw the Communist forces as a democratic movement. After Atkinson visited Mao, his article on his visit was Yenan: A Chinese Wonderland City. The Nationalists were in turn viewed as hopelessly reactionary and corrupt, a view that was then shared by many of the US press corps in China. The negative image of the Nationalists in the US played a significant factor in President Harry Truman's decision to end all aid to Chiang at the height of the Chinese Civil War.

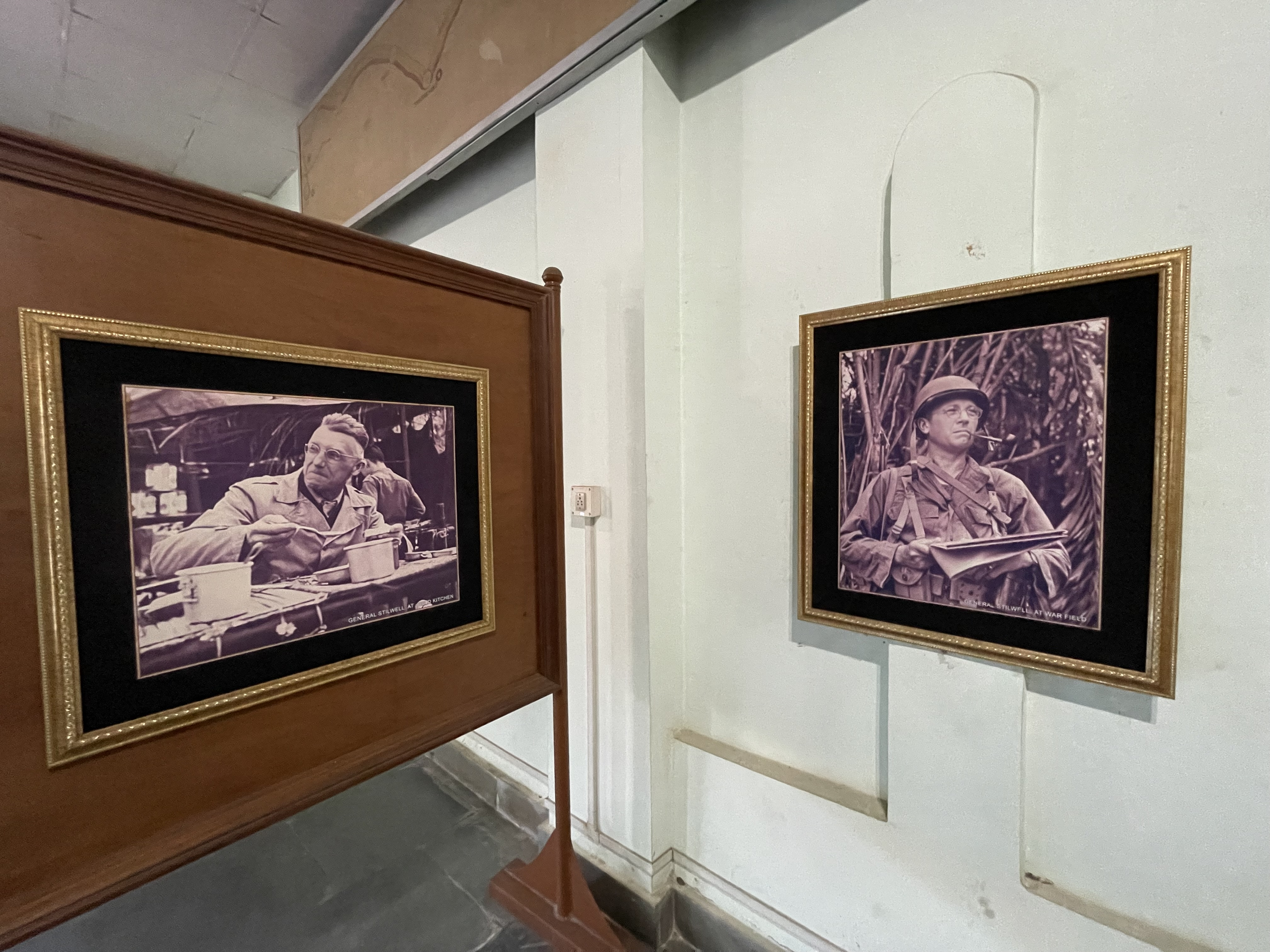
Pictures of Stilwell in the Coal Heritage Park & Museum, Margherita, Assam, located not far from Ledo, the starting point of Ledo Road (also called Stilwell Road).

The British historian Andrew Roberts quoted Stilwell's disparaging remarks about the British war effort in Asia to illustrate his strong Anglophobia, which became a stumbling block to smooth co-operation between American and British forces in Asia. The British historian Rana Mitter argued that Stilwell never appreciated that his position as Chiang's chief of staff did not give him as much authority as Marshall had in his position as army chief of staff. Chiang, not Stilwell, was the Chinese forces' commander-in chief, and Chiang resisted Stilwell's initiatives if they involved committing Chinese forces to do-or-die engagements or if Chinese troops were removed from his immediate control to bases in India. Mitter viewed Chiang as correct in attempting to husband China's resources after the serious losses in 1937 to 1941. Mitter also supported the view that Chennault could have accomplished much more if Stilwell had not diverted a large proportion of lend-lease equipment to the Chinese troops in India. Mitter factored in the impact of the collaborationist Wang Jingwei as yet another major force in China. Stilwell's mastery of written and spoken Chinese made him the default American choice for the China command. Mitter projected that his talents could have been far better employed in North Africa, as Marshall had originally planned.

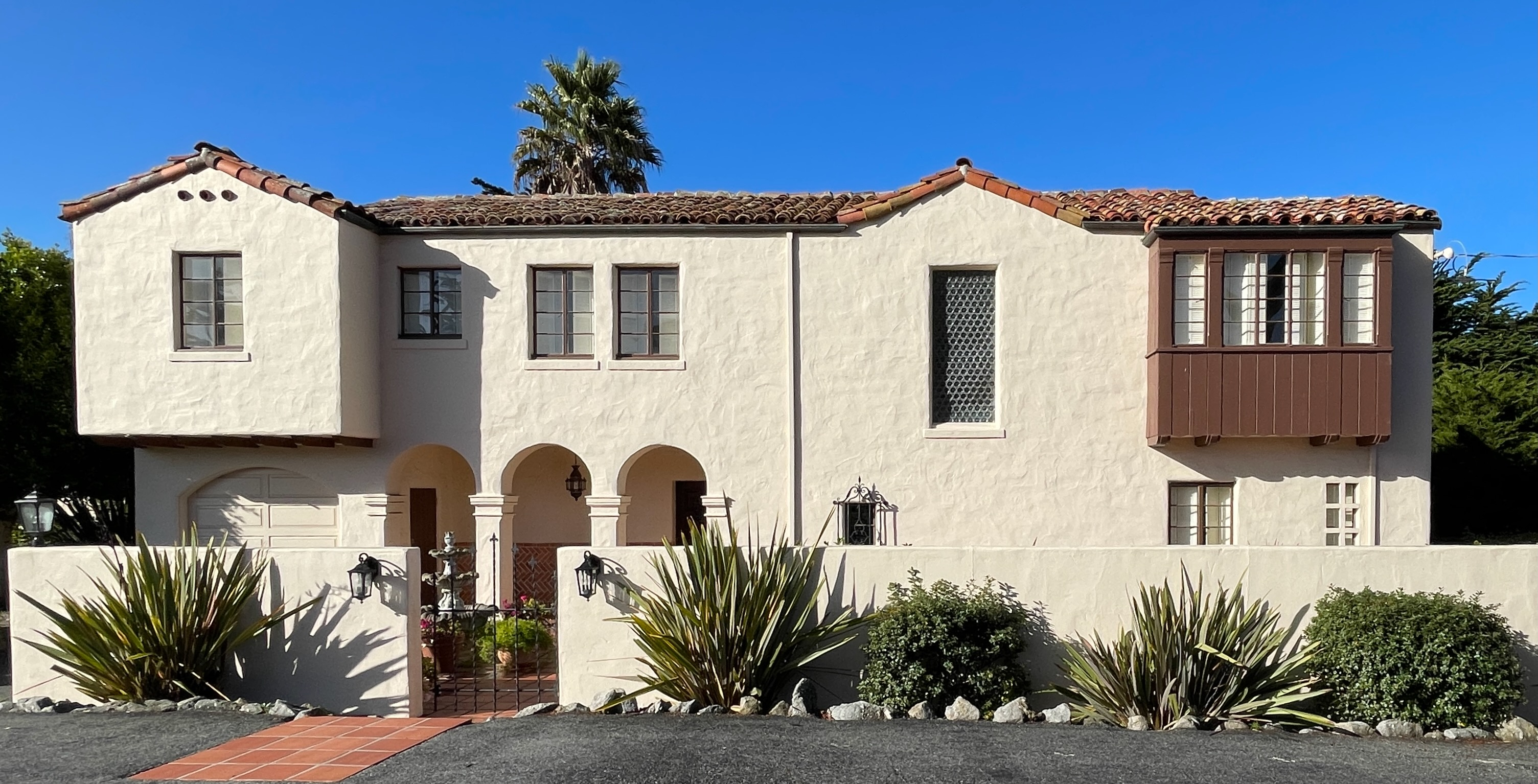
the General Joseph Stilwell House in Carmel Point.

The General Joseph Stilwell House was built between 1933 and 1934, located at 26218 Inspiration Avenue, in Carmel Point, at the southern city limits of Carmel-by-the-Sea, California. The large, two-story Spanish Eclectic-style house remains a private residence. A commemorative stone plaque has been placed on the left-hand side of the house.

A number of streets, buildings, and areas across the country have been named for Stilwell over the years, including Joseph Stilwell Middle School in Jacksonville, Florida. The Soldiers' Club that he envisioned in 1940, when there was no such thing as a soldiers' club in the army, was completed in 1943 at Fort Ord on the bluffs overlooking Monterey Bay. Many years later, the building was renamed to Stilwell Hall in his honor, but because of the erosion of the bluffs over the decades, the building was taken down in 2003. Stilwell's former residence in Chongqing, a city along the Yangtze River to which Chiang's government retreated after it had been forced from Nanjing by Japanese troops, has been converted to the General Joseph W. Stilwell Museum in his honor.

== In popular culture ==
Stilwell is portrayed on film by Erville Alderson in Objective, Burma! (1945), by John Hoyt in Samuel Fuller's Merrill's Marauders (1962), by Robert Stack in Steven Spielberg's 1941 (1979), and by Yachun Dong in Chinese Expeditionary Force (TV series) (2011).

On 24 August 2000, the US Postal Service issued the first 10¢ Distinguished Americans series postage stamp honoring Stilwell.

The award for the Outstanding Overall Cadet, Senior Division, in the California Cadet Corps is the General Joseph W. Stilwell Award.

Streets in Marina, California; Kendall Park, New Jersey; Pittsburgh, Pennsylvania; Albuquerque, New Mexico; and the Presidio of San Francisco are named for him.

== Awards and decorations ==
His awards include:

Combat Infantryman Badge
Distinguished Service Cross	Army Distinguished Service Medal with bronze oak leaf cluster	Legion of Merit
Bronze Star Medal	Philippine Campaign Medal	Mexican Border Service Medal
World War I Victory Medal	American Defense Service Medal	American Campaign Medal
Asiatic-Pacific Campaign Medal with three bronze campaign stars	World War II Victory Medal	Army of Occupation Medal with "ASIA" clasp (posthumous)
Chevalier of the Légion d'honneur (France)	Medal of Solidarity, 1918 (Panama)	Order of Blue Sky and White Sun (Republic of China) (offered to him twice and refused by him both times, according to a biographer).

- General Stilwell is one of five general officers who have been awarded the honorary Combat Infantryman Badge (CIB) for service while a general officer, along with General Matthew Ridgway, Major General William F. Dean, General of the Army Omar Bradley, and General of the Army Douglas MacArthur. Generals are not allowed to be awarded the CIB. The CIB is only available to colonels and below.

=== Distinguished Service Cross citation ===
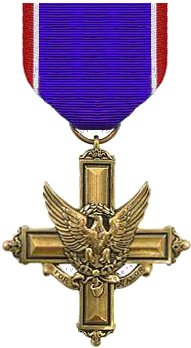
Army Distinguished Service Cross

Stilwell's official Distinguished Service Cross citation reads:

The President of the United States of America, authorized by Act of Congress, 9 July 1918, takes pleasure in presenting the Distinguished Service Cross to Lieutenant General Joseph Warren Stilwell, United States Army, for extraordinary heroism and conspicuous bravery in action while in command of the Chinese Forces in Burma during the Spring of 1942. General Stilwell's presence and personal example in an exposed position in the front lines of a Chinese division on 23 April 1942, inspired the unit to a renewed effort which resulted in the capture of Taunggyi. While at this position, General Stilwell was exposed to concentrated rifle, machine gun and mortar fire which inflicted heavy casualties on the Chinese troops in the immediate vicinity. On 28 April, while visiting the entire front of two Chinese divisions, he spent considerable time with one of them and, while on the ground, directed the readjustment of the forces. During the entire campaign he personally directed operations in positions which were subjected to continuous enemy aerial strafing and frequent air bombardment, with utter disregard for his own personal safety. General Stilwell's outstanding example of courage and leadership in direct contact with the enemy prolonged, at a critical time and place, the resistance of the forces of the United Nations against a better armed and determined enemy, who still maintained the powerful impetus of initial assault against the Allied forces.

== Dates of rank ==
No pin insignia in 1904	Second Lieutenant, Regular Army: 15 June 1904
	First Lieutenant, Regular Army: 3 March 1911
	Captain, Regular Army: 1 July 1916
	Major, National Army: 5 August 1917
	Lieutenant Colonel, National Army: 26 August 1918
	Colonel, National Army: 6 May 1919
	Captain, Regular Army: 14 September 1919 (reverted to permanent rank due to post-World War I reduction of the Army.)
	Major, Regular Army: 1 July 1920
	Lieutenant Colonel, Regular Army: 6 May 1928
	Colonel, Regular Army: 1 August 1935
	Brigadier General, Regular Army: 1 July 1939
	Major General, Army of the United States: 1 October 1940
	Lieutenant General, Army of the United States: 25 February 1942
	Major general, Regular Army: 1 September 1943
	General, Army of the United States: 7 August 1944

== See also ==
- Sino-Japanese War (1937–1945)
- Whampoa Military Academy
- History of the Republic of China
- Military of the Republic of China
- Y Force
- Charles N. Hunter

== Sources ==
- Jack Belden, Retreat With Stilwell, New York: Alfred A Knopf, 1943. Sympathetic eyewitness account.
- Frank Dorn, Walkout: With Stilwell in Burma, Pyramid Books 1973. By his principal aide.
- Fred Eldridge, Wrath in Burma The Uncensored Story of Gen. Stilwell Doubleday & Co., 1946.
- Evans, M. Stanton; Romerstein, Herbert (2013). Stalin's Secret Agents: The Subversion of Roosevelt's Government. Threshold Editions. ISBN 978-1439147702.
- Eric Larrabee, Commander In Chief, New York: Harper & Row, 1987. ISBN 0-06-039050-6
- Jon Latimer, Burma: The Forgotten War, London: John Murray, 2004. ISBN 978-0-7195-6576-2
- Barbara Tuchman, Stilwell and the American Experience in China, 1911–45, Macmillan 1970. Grove Press 2001. British edition: Sand Against the Wind: Stilwell and the American Experience in China 1911–45, London: Weidenfeld and Nicolson, 2001. ISBN 978-1-84212-281-5. Sympathetic full scale biography.
- John Masters, The Road Past Mandalay, London: Michael Joseph, 1961. First-hand account of the fighting in Burma by a Chindit officer.
- Pantsov, Alexander (2023). Victorious in Defeat : The Life and Times of Chiang Kai-Shek, China, 1887-1975. Translated by Steven I. Levine. New Haven: Yale University Press. ISBN 0300260202.
- Prefer, Nathan Vinegar Joe's War Presidio Press, 2000, ISBN 0-89141-715-X.
- Romanus, Charles F.; Sunderland, Riley (1987) [1953]. China-Burma-India Theater: Stilwell's Mission to China. United States Army in World War II. Washington, D.C.: United States Army Center of Military History. LCCN 53-60349. Index:CMH_Pub_9-1_Stilwell_in_China.pdf – via Wikisource.
- Charles F. Romanus Riley Sunderland, Stilwell's Command Problems (Washington: Department of the Army, Historical Division, 1956). Official Army history with extensive documentation.
- Rooney, D.D. Stilwell Pan Macmillan, 1973, ISBN 0-345-09789-0.
- Stilwell, Joseph; White, Theodore, Ed. The Stilwell Papers Da Capo Press, 1991, ISBN 0-306-80428-X. Stilwell's wartime diaries.
- Hans Van de Ven, "Stilwell in the Stocks: The Chinese Nationalists and the Allied Powers in the Second World War," Asian Affairs 34.3 (November 2003): 243–259. Revisionist study argues that Stilwell misunderstood Chiang's military strategy, which was actually flexible and well founded in Chinese realities.
- Hans J. Van de Ven, War and Nationalism in China, 1925–1945 (London; New York: RoutledgeCurzon, 2003). Expands revisionist view including longer period of time.
- Andrew Roberts, "Masters and Commanders: How Four Titans Won the War in the West, 1941–1945" (New York: Harper Perennial. 2010). Presents a harsher picture of Stilwell in course of examining Churchill, Roosevelt, Brook, and Marshall.
- Rana Mitter, "Forgotten Ally: China's World War II. 1937–1945" (Boston; New York: Houghton Mifflin Harcourt. 2013). Complete re-examination of the Chinese wars with Japan which argues that the memory of 'betrayals' by Britain, America, and Russia continues to influence China's worldview today.

Military offices
Preceded by Newly activated organization	Commanding General 7th Infantry Division; 1940–1941	Succeeded by Charles White
Preceded by Walter K. Wilson Sr.	Commanding General III Corps; July 1941–December 1941	Succeeded by Walter K. Wilson Sr.
Preceded by Walter Kruegner	Commanding General Sixth United States Army; 1946	Succeeded by George P. Hays
Preceded by Roy Geiger	Commanding General Tenth United States Army; 1945–1946	Succeeded by Post deactivated
Preceded by Ben Lear	Commanding General Army Ground Forces; January–June 1945	Succeeded by Jacob L. Devers
