= Charles Newton Hunter =

United States Army officer and author (1906–1978)

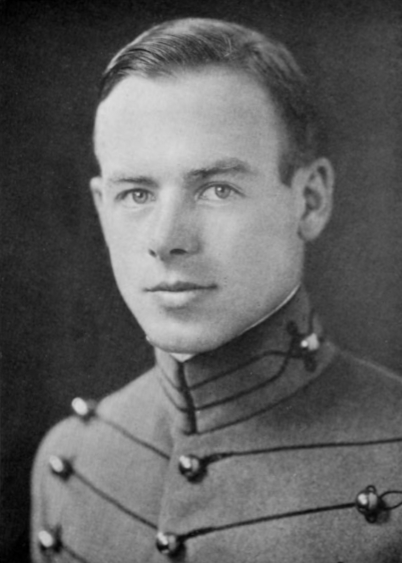
- As a West Point cadet
- Born: January 11, 1906; Oneida, New York, United States
- Died: June 14, 1978 (aged 72); Cheyenne, Wyoming, United States
- Military career
- Allegiance: United States
- Branch: United States Army
- Service years: 1929–1959
- Rank: Colonel
- Nickname: Chuck
- Commands: Merrill's Marauders; China Burma India Theater
- Conflicts: World War II; Burma Campaign

Charles Newton Hunter (January 11, 1906 – June 14, 1978) was the author of the book Galahad (1963), a first person account of the Burma Campaign in World War II. Galahad was the code-name for the U.S. Army's 5307th Composite Unit (provisional), better known as Merrill's Marauders. According to writer Charlton Ogburn, "Colonel Charles N. Hunter had been with Galahad from the start as its ranking or second ranking officer, had commanded it during its times of greatest trial, and was more responsible than any other individual for its record of achievement."

== West Point ==
Charles Newton Hunter was born in Oneida, New York on January 11, 1906. He began his Army career as a West Point graduate. The West Point Howitzer Yearbook, Class of 1929, notes that he was known to his classmates as "Newt" from his middle name, "Newton". He is described as having a "ruddy countenance, slightly tilted nose, sandy hair, and twinkling blue eyes carry an appeal that can pass unnoticed by no mortal lass."

== WWII and Training for Burma ==
Following the Quebec meeting between President Roosevelt and Prime Minister Churchill a decision was made to create long range penetration groups to get behind the Japanese lines as a part of an overall Asian mainland offensive.

Lieutenant Colonel Hunter, with three years of experience in the Philippines, two years in the Canal Zone doing jungle warfare training, and most recently in charge of the combat training course in the infantry school, Fort Benning, Georgia, was put in charge of the shipment of the new unit to India and their subsequent training.

Colonel Hunter was able to obtain enough Galahad volunteers with previous experience with mules or horses to take care of the 700 pack animals in the 5307th. Each Special Force brigade also utilized up to 1,000 mules. Special attention was given to the very difficult training of the animals and their handlers for river crossings. Problems in this area, if not solved promptly, could hold a jungle column up for hours on a river bank. During the course of the operation, the men grew to love many of their animals, and they cared for and protected them just as if they were fellow soldiers. Incidentally, the Special Force debrayed their pack animals for security. Hunter, however, refused to debray Galahad's animals, stating that braying was one of the few pleasures a jackass enjoyed. He later claimed that to his knowledge their brays never posed a noise problem. Apparently, the mules were just too tired to bray.

As a final training preparation before going into battle, Hunter hiked Galahad over 140 miles from their last assembly area to their jump-off site beyond Ledo. He claimed that this decision, despite its unpopularity, accomplished a number of goals. It completed the conditioning of the men and animals (who had lately undergone a soft three weeks of travel time by train). Next, it allowed the muleteers and their animals to adjust to each other on the trail. Furthermore, it 'sweat in' the pack saddles to the animal's backs. And finally, it eliminated unfit men from the ranks. Hunter stated that, "More than any other single part of Galahad's training, the hike down the Ledo Road, in my professional judgment, paid the highest dividends." Having completed this arduous hike with full loads, marching primarily at night over mountainous terrain, the men of Galahad lacked no confidence in their ability to meet the physical demands of the coming operation.

== Merrill's Marauders and Burma ==
In February 1944, under command of Brigadier General Frank Merrill, 2,503 men and 360 mules began a 1,000 mile march - out of India, over the Patkai region of the Himalayas and deep into the Burmese jungle.

But on March 29, General Merrill suffered his first heart attack and command returned to then executive officer, Colonel Hunter.

Following months of forced marches through monsoon season, weakened by hunger and malnutrition, suffering from amoebic dysentery, malaria, various fevers, snake bite, scrub typhus, and fungal skin diseases they were reaching the end of their ability to continue. Captain Fred O. Lyons said the last thing keeping him going had been not letting Colonel Hunter down:

By now my dysentery was so violent I was draining blood. Every one of the men was sick from one cause or another. My shoulders were worn raw from the pack straps, and I left the pack behind .. The boys with me weren't in much better shape ... A scout moving ahead suddenly held his rifle high in the air. That meant Enemy sighted ... Then at last we saw them, coming down the railroad four abreast ... The gunner crouched low over his tommy-gun and tightened down. Then the gun spoke. Down flopped a half-dozen Japs, then another half dozen. The [Japanese] column spewed from their marching formation into the bush. We grabbed up the gun and slid back into the jungle. Sometimes staggering, sometimes running, sometimes dragging, I made it back to camp. I was so sick I didn't care whether the Japs broke through or not; so sick I didn't worry any more about letting the colonel down. All I wanted was unconsciousness.

August 3, 1944, following the last battle, Myitkyina was declared secure and on that day Col. Hunter was sent back to the United States.

After five major battles and seventeen minor engagements only two men survived without being hospitalized or killed. One was a Lieutenant Phil Weld, who later became famous for his single-handed ocean racing of small sailboats. The other was Colonel Charles N. Hunter.

== After the war ==
After World War II, Colonel Hunter was Deputy Chief of Staff of the 4th Army and Commanding Officer of Fort Sam Houston in San Antonio, Texas.

He retired to Cheyenne, Wyoming, home of his wife, Don Mae, who died February 27, 1970, of heart failure. His daughter Anne died in 1959, and Sue in 1977.

== Quotation ==
Sick men have no morale

— After Myitkyina, Colonel Hunter referred to the fact that at some point, even the most heroic of men can go no further

== Bibliography ==
- Charles Newton Hunter, Galahad (San Antonio, TX: Naylor Co., 1963)
- Charlton Ogburn, The Marauders (New York: Harper & Brothers, 1956)
- Charles N. Hunter, AGF Report of Overseas Observations with Units in C.B.I. February 17, 1945.

== See also ==
- Merrill's Marauders
- China Burma India Theater of World War II
- Frank Merrill
- Joseph Stilwell
- Long range penetration
- United States Army Rangers
- Former United States special operations units
- Special forces
- Roy Matsumoto
- David Richardson
- Charlton Ogburn
