= Frank Merrill =

United States Army general (1903–1955)

Frank D. Merrill
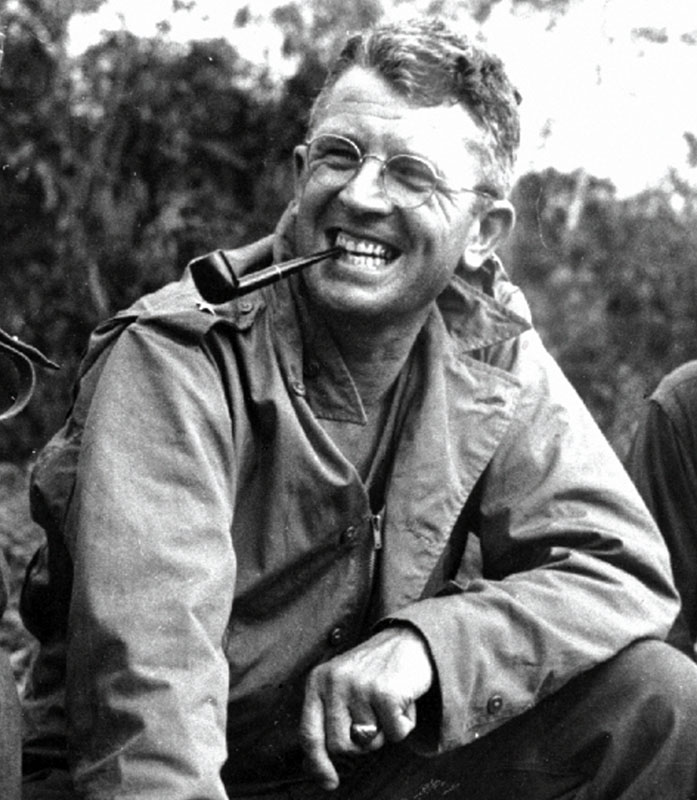
- Born: December 4, 1903; Hopkinton, Massachusetts, United States
- Died: December 11, 1955 (aged 52); Fernandina Beach, Florida, United States
- Military career
- Allegiance: United States of America
- Branch: United States Army
- Service years: 1922–1948
- Rank: Major General
- Commands: Merrill's Marauders
- Conflicts: World War II; Battle of Alcatraz
- Awards: Distinguished Service Medal; Bronze Star; Legion of Merit; Purple Heart

Frank Dow Merrill (December 4, 1903 – December 11, 1955) was a United States Army general and is best remembered for his command of Merrill's Marauders, officially the 5307th Composite Unit (provisional), in the Burma Campaign of World War II. Merrill's Marauders came under General Joseph Stilwell's Northern Combat Area Command. It was a special forces unit modelled on the Chindits' long range penetration groups trained to operate from bases deep behind Japanese lines.

== Background and early career ==
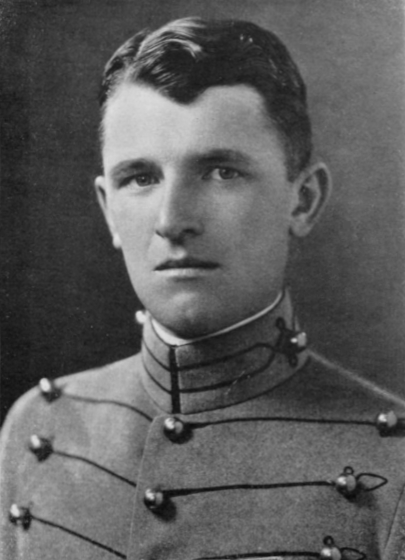
As a West Point cadet

Born on December 4, 1903, in Hopkinton, Massachusetts, Merrill lived with his family in Amesbury, Massachusetts, and graduated from Amesbury High School. He enlisted in the U.S. Army in 1922 and earned the rank of staff sergeant in Company A, 11th Engineers.

He received an appointment to West Point in 1925 and he graduated in 1929. He subsequently earned a B.S. in military engineering from the Massachusetts Institute of Technology in 1932. In 1938, Merrill became the Military Attaché in Tokyo where he studied the Japanese language.

He joined General Douglas MacArthur's staff in the Philippines in 1941 as a military intelligence officer. Merrill was on a mission in Rangoon, Burma, at the time of the Pearl Harbor attack and remained in Burma after the Japanese invasion.

In November 1943, Colonel Merrill was promoted to brigadier general only a month before his fortieth birthday, making him one of the youngest American generals since the Civil War. Even more remarkable was that he had been serving as a commissioned officer for only 14 years. He was promoted to major general in September 1944 at the age of 40.

== Merrill's Marauders ==
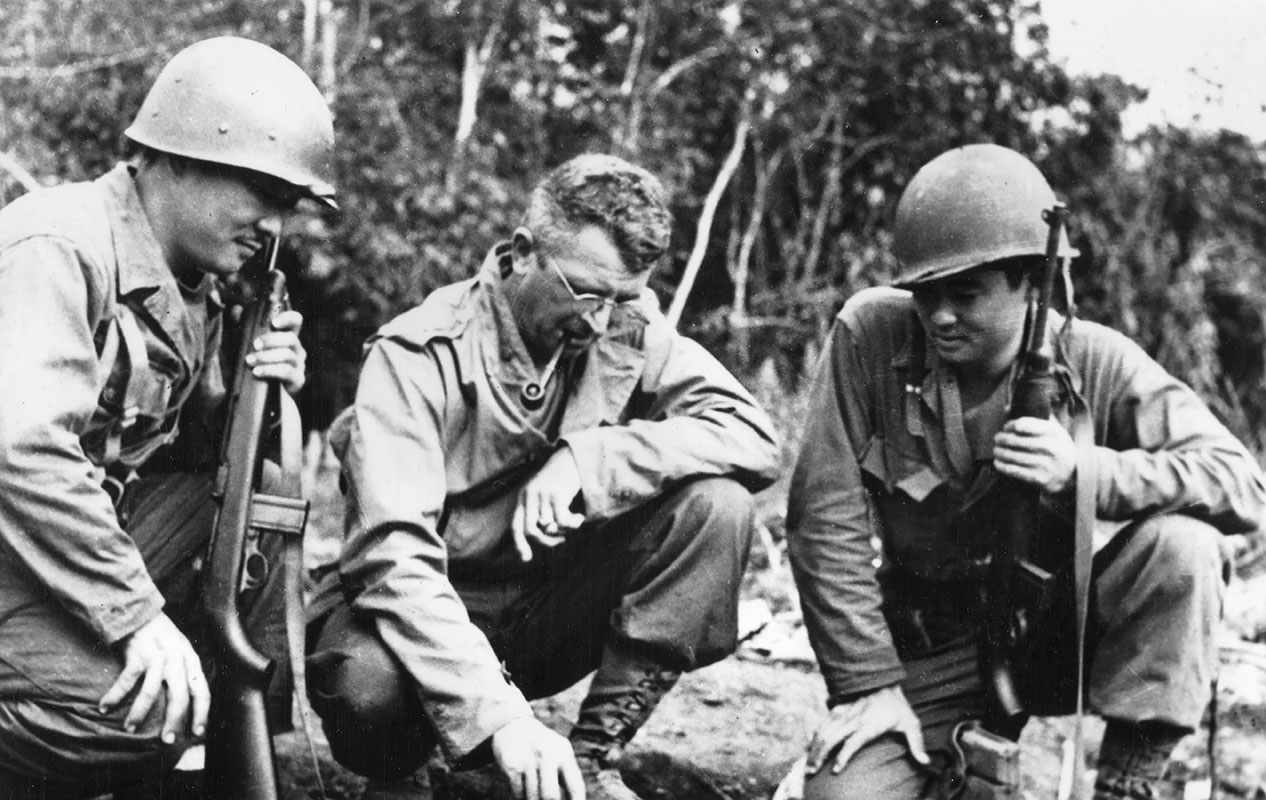
Frank D. Merrill (center) explains battle situation to L. Herb Miyazaki and R. Akiji Yoshimura, interpreters for 3rd Battalion 5307th, Burma, 1944

In 1943, General Merrill was appointed to command a new volunteer U.S. Army special forces unit patterned after the Long Range Jungle Penetration groups formed by the British to harass Japanese forces in Burma (the Chindits). The U.S. Army's official name for the unit was the 5307th Composite Unit (Provisional). (The title provisional meant the unit was formed for a special mission or operation and would be disbanded afterwards.) Visiting war correspondents, after viewing the 5307th's performance on the firing ranges, promptly dubbed the unit Merrill's Marauders. General Merrill oversaw the training and deployment of the three battalions of the 5307th into Burma in February 1944.

In slightly more than five months of combat behind Japanese lines in Burma, the Marauders, who supported the X Force, advanced 750 miles through some of the harshest jungle terrain in the world, fought in five major engagements (Walawbum, Shaduzup, Inkangahtawng, Nhpum Ga, and Myitkyina) and engaged in combat with the Japanese Army on thirty-two occasions. Battling Japanese soldiers, hunger, and disease, they had traversed more jungle on their long-range patrols than any other U.S. Army unit of the war.

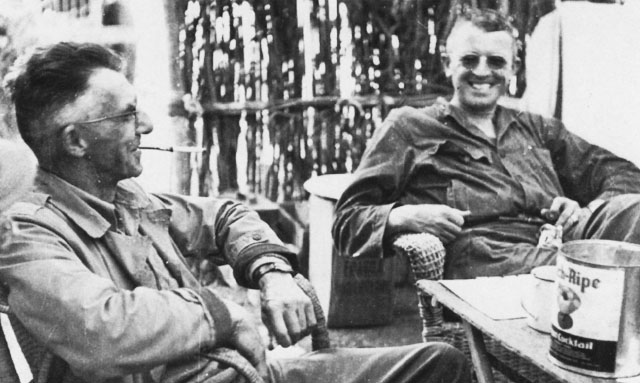
General Stilwell (left) and Merrill in 1944

On March 29, Merrill suffered his first heart attack and command returned to then executive officer, Colonel Charles N. Hunter. In their final mission against the Japanese base at Myitkyina, the Marauders suffered 272 killed, 955 wounded, and 980 evacuated for illness and disease. By the time the town of Myitkyina was taken, only about 200 surviving members of the original Marauders were present.

On August 10, 1944, a week after the town's fall to U.S. and Chinese forces, the 5307th was disbanded with a final total of only 130 combat-effective officers and men (out of the original 2,997).

== Post war ==
After the war's end, Merrill served in the Philippines. In early 1946 he was assigned to the headquarters of the 6th Army, headquartered at The Presidio Army Post in San Francisco, under General Stilwell. In May of the same year, Merrill and Stilwell led two Marine platoons to suppress a prison uprising at Alcatraz Federal Penitentiary in what is known as the Battle of Alcatraz.

Due to post-war downsizing of the Army, Merrill was reduced in rank to brigadier general on 1 June 1946. He retired from the Army in his permanent rank of colonel on 30 June 1948, and was promoted to brigadier general on the retired list the next day.

After retiring from the Army, Merrill became the New Hampshire Commissioner of Highways. In December 1955, he was elected President of the American Association of State Highway and Transportation Officials but died of a heart attack two days later in Fernandina Beach, Florida.

== Legacy ==
In 1992, General Merrill was inducted into the U.S. Army Ranger Hall of Fame as a member of its inaugural class of inductees.

The Everett Turnpike bridge over New Hampshire's Souhegan River was a favorite of Merrill's, and is dedicated to Merrill's Marauders.

Camp Frank D. Merrill, near Dahlonega, Georgia, is home to the three-week mountain training phase of the United States Army Ranger School.

The U.S. Army retroactively awarded members of Merrill's Marauders the U.S. Army Ranger Tab.

== In popular culture ==
Merrill was played by Jeff Chandler in the 1962 film Merrill's Marauders.

== Awards and decorations ==

Combat Infantryman Badge
| Army Distinguished Service Medal | Legion of Merit | Bronze Star Medal |
| Purple Heart | American Defense Service Medal with "Foreign Service" clasp | American Campaign Medal |
| Asiatic-Pacific Campaign Medal with three bronze campaign stars | World War II Victory Medal | Honorary Companion of the Order of the Indian Empire (CIE) |

== Dates of rank ==
Sources:

- Enlisted (rose to the rank of Staff Sergeant): 14 July 1922
- Cadet, USMA: 1 July 1925

| Second Lieutenant, Regular Army: June 13, 1929 |
| First Lieutenant, Regular Army: November 1, 1934 |
| Captain, Regular Army: June 13, 1939 |
| Major, Army of the United States: October 10, 1941 |
| Lieutenant Colonel, Army of the United States: May 25, 1942 |
| Colonel, Army of the United States: January 8, 1943 |
| Brigadier General, Army of the United States: November 8, 1943 |
| Major General, Army of the United States: September 5, 1944 |
| Brigadier General, Army of the United States: June 1, 1946 |
| Colonel, Regular Army: June 10, 1948 |
| Brigadier General, Regular Army (Retd.): July 1, 1948 |

Note: The Army of the United States (AUS) was an administrative designation for officer commissions which were temporary due to wartime needs. Officers with these commissions were frequently reduced in rank after the war's conclusion.

== See also ==
- China Burma India Theater
- Charles N. Hunter
- Merrill's Marauders
- United States Army Rangers
