= Roy Matsumoto =

Japanese-American soldier (1913–2014)

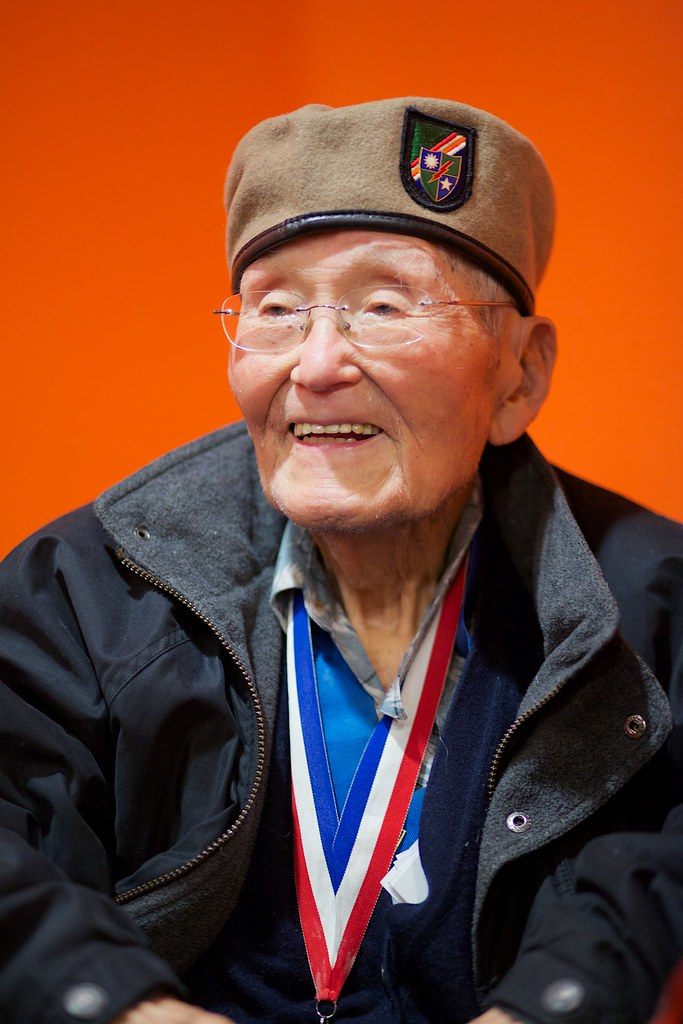
- Born: May 1, 1913; Laguna, California
- Died: April 21, 2014 (aged 100); San Juan Island, Washington
- Military career
- Allegiance: United States of America
- Branch: United States Army
- Service years: 1943–1963
- Rank: Master Sergeant
- Unit: 5307th Composite Unit
- Conflicts: World War II: Burma Campaign
- Awards: Bronze Star Medal; Legion of Merit; Congressional Gold Medal

Roy Hiroshi Matsumoto (Japanese: 松本 博, May 1, 1913 – April 21, 2014) was a Japanese-American soldier who fought with the Merrill's Marauders during World War II. He received several awards for his contribution including the Bronze Star Medal and the Legion of Merit.

== Early life ==
A Nisei, Matsumoto was born in Laguna, California. Matsumoto's grandfather moved to the United States from Japan in 1888 where he worked as a farmer. Matsumoto's father moved to the U.S. about thirty years later in 1908, and Matsumoto was born shortly after. He lived in Laguna until third grade in which he spent most of his time playing with neighborhood kids and going to school. Before going to school, he went by the name Hiroshi, as that was the name his parents gave him. At his first school, his teacher told him that the name Hiroshi was too difficult to pronounce and suggested he go by the name Roy. When he was 8, Matsumoto's family decided to go to Hiroshima to visit their family over the summer. However, after the summer ended they decided to stay in Japan. Matsumoto attended middle school and high school (chugakko) in Japan and did some required military training. He returned to California nine years later, attending and graduating from Long Beach Polytechnic High School in 1933. He remained in Long Beach when his parents took his brothers and sisters back to Hiroshima. He worked several jobs after graduating high school including working in a market and as a delivery boy.

== Concentration Camp and Assembly Center ==
After the attack on Pearl Harbor and signing of Executive Order 9066, he was sent to the Santa Anita Race Track which was converted to an assembly center. He slept in stalls that were initially meant to store horses. The stalls were still filthy and there were traces of horse manure and hay on the ground. Matsumoto was interned with other Japanese-Americans in the Jerome, Arkansas concentration camp through the opening stages of the Second World War. At Jerome, Matsumoto worked in the mess hall and organized food and supplies.

== MIS and Army Training ==
In 1942, Matsumoto volunteered for the United States Army. A month after joining the United States Army, Matsumoto was selected for the MIS (Military Intelligence Service). He attended the MIS Language School at Camp Savage, Minnesota, where he would graduate at the top of his class. After completing Language School, Matsumoto was sent to Camp Shelby, Mississippi for Basic Infantry Training. After graduating basic training at Camp Shelby, he became one of fourteen linguists selected from two hundred Nisei volunteers to join Merrill's Marauders.

== Merrill's Marauders ==
He served as a Japanese-language intelligence specialist with Merrill's Marauders in the Burma Campaign during World War II, earning a Bronze Star and the Legion of Merit. While Matsumoto was one among almost 3000 Marauders, he was but only 1 of 14 linguists who were able to serve as translators while in the field. His skills as a linguist would serve as an invaluable asset to the unit during the four months they spent in Burma. Not only was Matsumoto tasked with interrogating prisoners and translating intercepted communications, he was also tasked with operating behind enemy lines in order to gather intelligence for operations. In this manner, Matsumoto facilitated bombing runs on enemy supply depots as well as obtaining valuable intelligence about upcoming enemy assaults, helping the Marauders repel them with no casualties. Many who would be involved in these counterattacks would go on to say “We owe our lives to Matsumoto.”

== After the War and achievements ==
Post war, Matsumoto remained in the Army for 20 years, retiring after a career in military intelligence as a master sergeant in 1963. As an intel gatherer for the Military Intelligence, he had received numerous medals and awards of recognition for his services including; the Legion of Merit, the Bronze Star Medal (1 Oak Leaf Cluster), the Combat Infantry Badge, the Good Conduct Medal with 5 Bronze Star Loops, the Presidential Unit Citation (Northern Burma), the Army Commendation Medal, the Asia-Pacific Campaign Medal (India-Burma, Northern Burma, China Theater), the National Defense Medal, the World War II Victory Medal, and the Occupation Medal (Japan). In addition, he received the Certificate of Honor for Liberation Star Award from the country of Burma and the War Memorial Medal from China. On July 19, 1993, MSG Matsumoto was recognized for his outstanding contribution during the siege at Nhpum Ga by his induction into the Ranger Hall of Fame at Fort Benning, Georgia. After death, he was still highly respected as a soldier in the U.S. Army and is seen as a war hero.

At the time of his death, he lived with his wife on San Juan Island, Washington. During retirement, he had spent time with his daughter in Alaska, as he would enjoy hobbies like fishing and nature sight seeing. In 1993, Matsumoto was inducted into the U.S. Army Rangers Hall of Fame and four years later was inducted into the Military Intelligence Corps Hall of Fame in 1997. Matsumoto received the Congressional Gold Medal in 2011, along with other surviving Nisei World War II veterans, in November 2011. He turned 100 in May 2013 and died in April 2014.

== See also ==
- Merrill's Marauders
- Charles N. Hunter
