= David Richardson (American journalist) =

American soldier and journalist (1916–2005)

David Richardson (1916–2005) was an American journalist and United States Army soldier. A member of Merrill's Marauders, he became famous for his behind the lines coverage of their combat exploits during the Burma Campaign of World War II. His articles for Yank, the Army Weekly describing the Marauders' campaign's record-setting marches and heavy sustained fighting were noted as "[capturing] the flavor of battle, as well as the Marauders' jingoistic pride and derring-do".

== Biography ==
Born in New Jersey, Richardson was initially rejected by the Army for being underweight and subsequently enlisted as a reporter. Reaching the rank of Technical Sergeant, he volunteered to chronicle the 1,000 mile march of the 5307th Composite Unit (Provisional), better known as Merrill's Marauders, and their subsequent fighting.

=== Burma Campaign ===
In 1943, Richardson joined the Marauders and began a four-month training program to prepare himself and the other Marauders for their attack. In February 1944, the Marauders began their four-month march over the Himalayas and through the Burmese jungle. Unusual for a reporter, Richardson would often fight alongside his fellow soldiers. David Quaid, a photojournalist, remarked of him that "The stuff he wrote was like what no one else was doing. ... When it got dicey, the only correspondent there was Dave Richardson."

=== Retirement ===
Richardson retired in 1982 and settled down in Washington, DC. Giving several speeches during his retirement years, he was quoted as saying that the reason why he was constantly at the forefront of combat and other dangers was "for a good story." He died at the age of 88, in 2005 of prostate cancer. He was interred with his wife Ruth (1922–1987) at Arlington National Cemetery.

== Awards ==
David Richardson is believed to be the most highly decorated soldier-journalist of World War II. He received two Bronze Stars, the Legion of Merit and the Combat Infantryman Badge. It is reported that he would have been eligible to be awarded the Purple Heart for a head wound in New Guinea, however he refused treatment and returned to action, wearing an eyepatch. Refusing treatment prevented proper documentation of the incident for the award citation.

== See also ==
- Colonel Charles N. Hunter was the commanding officer of Merrill's Marauders during most of the Burma Campaign.
