= Merrill's Marauders =

5307th Composite Unit (provisional)
- Shoulder sleeve insignia (SSI) of the 5307th Composite Unit
- Active: 1943–1944
- Country: United States
- Branch: United States Army
- Type: Special operations force
- Role: Anti-tank warfare Artillery observer Bomb disposal Casualty evacuation Close-quarters battle Counter-battery fire Direct action Guerrilla warfare Hit-and-run tactics Indirect fire Jungle warfare Long-range penetration Military communications Military intelligence Mountain warfare Raiding; Reconnaissance; Special operations Special reconnaissance Tracking; Trench warfare
- Size: Regimental
- Nickname: Merrill's Marauders
- Engagements: World War II; Burma campaign

Commanders
- Notable commanders: Frank Merrill; Charles N. Hunter

Merrill’s Marauders (named after Frank Merrill) or Unit Galahad, officially named the 5307th Composite Unit (Provisional), was a United States Army special operations force unit that specialized in artillery observer, close-quarters battle, combat patrol, commando style raids in jungle warfare, guerrilla warfare, long-range penetration, special reconnaissance, and tracking targets to frontline military intelligence gathering or surprise attacks, which fought in the South-East Asian theatre of World War II, or China Burma India theater (CBI).

The unit became famous for its long-range penetration missions behind Japanese lines, often engaging Imperial Japanese forces superior in number.

== Formation and training ==
In the Quebec Conference (QUADRANT) of August 1943, Allied leaders decided to form a U.S. long-range penetration unit that would attack Japanese troops in Burma. The new U.S. force was directly inspired by, and partially modeled on Orde Wingate's Chindits Long Range Penetration Force. A call for volunteers attracted around 3,000 men.

A Memorandum from the Operations Division (OPD) of the United States Department of War (War Department) dated 18 September 1943 (OPD 320.2) listed the proposed composition of the new American long-range penetration force, which would be an all-volunteer unit. The Caribbean Defense Command provided 960 jungle warfare-trained officers and men, 970 jungle-trained officers and men came from Army Ground Forces units based in the continental United States, and a further 674 "battle-tested" jungle warfare troops came from the South Pacific Command, chiefly Army veterans of the Guadalcanal campaign and Solomon Islands campaign, with all troops to assemble at Nouméa, New Caledonia.

General Douglas MacArthur was also directed to transfer 274 Army combat-experienced volunteers from the Southwest Pacific Command, veterans of the New Guinea campaign and Bougainville campaign. A few Pacific veteran volunteers came from stockade, with volunteering earning them their freedom; they were sprinkled throughout the unit and called "The Dead End Kids" after the Hollywood film series featuring juvenile delinquents. The unit was officially designated as 5307th Composite Unit (Provisional) with the code name Galahad.

The men were first sent to India arriving in Bombay on 31 October 1943 to train. Here they were reinforced with Army Air Corps and Signal Corps personnel, as well as an animal transport company with mules and experienced muleteers. Officers and men were equipped with U.S. Herringbone Twill (HBT) uniform cotton OD uniforms, M1943 fatigues, Type II field shoes (with or without canvas leggings), jungle boots, canvas load-bearing equipment, blanket (one-half tent or "shelter-half" per man), poncho, and a machete or kukri for brush clearing.

Small arms included the .30-06 M1 Garand, the .30-06 M1903A4 sniper rifle, the .30 M1 carbine, the .45 Thompson submachine gun, the .45 M1911 pistol, the .30-06 BAR (M1922 machine rifle version), and the .30 M1919 Browning air-cooled belt-fed machine gun. Mules were used to haul radios, ammunition, and heavier support weapons, including the 2.36-inch M1A1 bazooka and the U.S. 60 mm M2 Mortar. The mortar was often employed without its bipod in order to speed deployment.

The 5307th was originally destined to train in long-range penetration tactics under the direction of Brigadier Charles Orde Wingate, commander of the Chindits. At Deolali, 200 km (125 miles) outside Bombay, the troops endured both physical conditioning and close-order drill, before entraining for Deogarh, Madhya Pradesh.

The unit was to have 700 animals that included 360 mules. There were to be as many more but the ship that was carrying them was torpedoed in the Arabian Sea. They were replaced by 360 Australian Waler horses that had originally been with the 112th Cavalry in New Caledonia who were deemed unfit for jungle warfare. They had traveled to India where they served with the Chinese Army before being assigned to the 5307th.

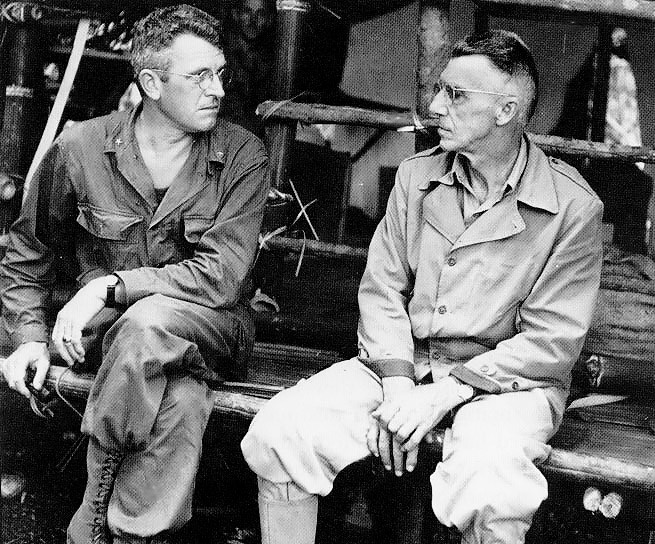
Merrill and Stilwell in Burma

From the end of November 1943 to the end of January 1944, the 5307th remained at Deogarh and trained intensively. All officers and men received instruction in anti-tank warfare, artillery observer, camouflage, close-quarters battle, combat patrol, commando style raids in jungle warfare, counter-battery fire, defusing and disposal of bombs and land mines, demolitions, evacuation of wounded personnel, field military intelligence gathering, guerrilla warfare, hand-to-hand combat, jungle survival, light and heavy weapons, maps and navigation, military communications, military engineering, reconnaissance, scouting, small unit tactics on entrenchments, stream crossings, tactical emergency medical, and the then-novel technique of supply by airdrop. Special emphasis was placed on "jungle lane" marksmanship at pop-up and moving targets using small arms. In December the 5307th conducted a weeklong maneuver in coordination with Chindit forces.

U.S. General Joseph Stilwell was determined that the only U.S. combat troops available in the theater would not serve under British command. As the only Allied ground commander without a subordinate contingent of infantry forces from his own army, Stilwell was aware that he would have minimal influence upon Allied ground strategy in Burma unless he could gain command of the Marauders. Admiral Lord Mountbatten, the supreme Allied commander of the South East Asia Command (SEAC), was persuaded by Stilwell, deputy supreme Allied commander, that they should serve under the Northern Combat Area Command (NCAC).

Stilwell appointed Brigadier General Frank Merrill to command them. Several American war correspondents had come to Deogarh to hear about the unit and its training; the reporters sat around trying to think of an appealing nickname for the 5307th that would capture the interest of the American public. Time correspondent James R. Shepley came up with "Merrill's Marauders" and that name stuck.

== Operations ==
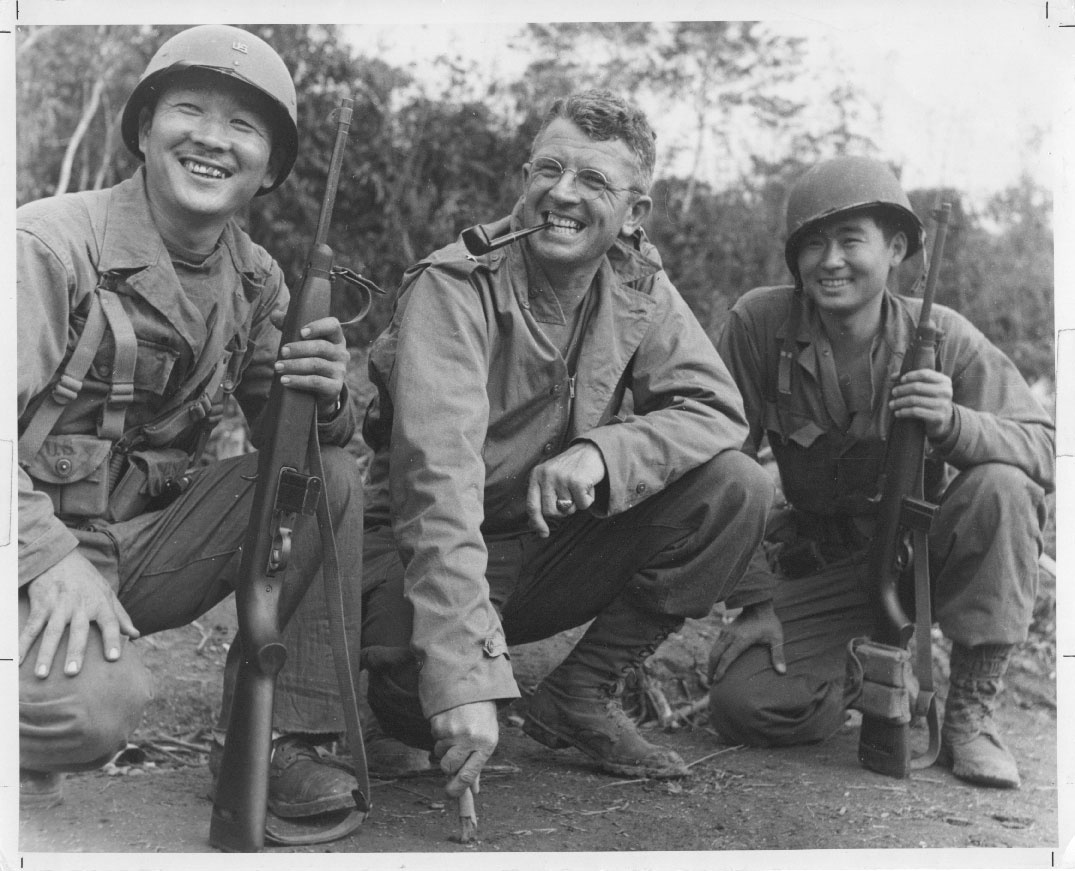
Brig Gen Frank Merrill, poses with Japanese-American interpreters T/Sgt. Herbert Miyasaki and T/Sgt. Akiji Yoshimura in Burma. 1 May 1944.

In early 1944, the Marauders were organized as an elite light infantry assault unit, with mule transport for their 60 mm mortars, bazookas, ammunition, communications gear, and supplies. Although the 5307th's three battalions were equivalent to a regimental-size unit, its lack of organic heavy weapons support meant the force had a combat power less than that of a single regular American infantry battalion, a fact that General Stilwell and his NCAC staff did not always appreciate. Without heavy weapons support, the unit would have to rely on flexibility and surprise to outfight considerably larger Japanese forces.

A little known secret to the Marauders' success was the inclusion of fourteen Japanese-American Military Intelligence Service translators assigned to the unit, including future United States Army Rangers (Army Rangers) and Military Intelligence Hall of Fame inductee Roy Matsumoto.

Weight was critical to the Marauders, and the need for a compact, lightweight field ration was essential; unfortunately, the best solution, the dry Jungle Ration, at 4,000 calories per day, had been discontinued for cost reasons in 1943. On the advice of Army supply officers in Washington, General Stilwell and his G-4 staff determined that a one-per-day issuance of the U.S. Army's 2,830 calorie K-ration (one K ration = three meals) would be sufficient to maintain the Marauders in the field. While compact, the K ration not only had fewer calories but less bulk, and included some components so unappetizing as to be thrown away by many users.

On the advice of British General Orde Wingate, the force was divided into two self-contained combat teams per battalion. In February 1944, in an offensive designed to disrupt Japanese offensive operations, three battalions in six combat teams (coded Red, White, Blue, Khaki, Green, and Orange) marched into Burma. On 24 February, the force began a 1,000-mile march over the Patkai range and into the Burmese jungle behind Japanese lines. A total of 2,750 Marauders entered Burma; the remaining 247 men remained in India as headquarters and support personnel.

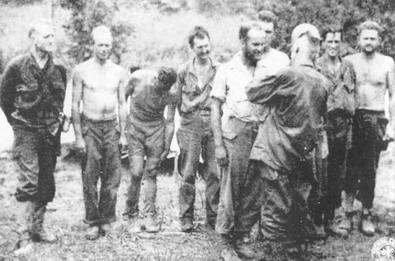
General Stilwell awarding medals at Myitkyina.

While in Burma, the Marauders were usually outnumbered by Japanese troops from the 18th Division, but always inflicted many more casualties than they suffered. Led by Kachin scouts, and using mobility and surprise, the Marauders harassed supply and communication lines, shot up patrols, and assaulted Japanese rear areas, in one case cutting off the Japanese rearguard at Maingkwan. Near Walawbum, a town believed by General Stilwell's NCAC staff to be lightly held, the 3rd Battalion killed some 400–500 enemy soldiers.

The Japanese were continually surprised by the heavy, accurate volume of fire they received when attacking Marauder positions. Its combat-experienced officers had carefully integrated light mortar and machine gun fires, and virtually every man was armed with a self-loading or automatic weapon in which he had trained to a high level of marksmanship. In March they severed Japanese supply lines in the Hukawng Valley.

Informed by the British that the situation in Imphal was under control, Stilwell wanted to launch a final assault to capture the Japanese airfield at Myitkyina. Always guarded against the potential for interference by the British, General Stilwell did not coordinate his plans with Admiral Mountbatten, instead transmitting separate orders to his Chinese forces and the Marauders. The men took a brief rest at Shikau Gau, a jungle village clearing where they bartered with the native inhabitants for fresh eggs and chickens with an issue of 10-in-one and C rations. The Marauders also took the opportunity to sunbathe in an attempt to control the onset of various fungal skin diseases. Now down to a little over 2,200 officers and men, the 5307th began a series of battles on the march to Myitkyina.

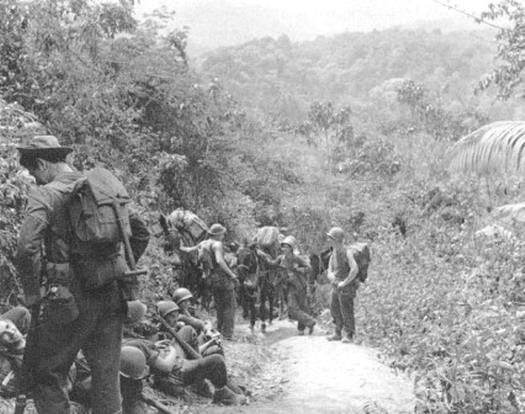
Marauders rest during a break along a jungle trail near Nhpum Ga.

In April, the Marauders were ordered by General Stilwell to take up a blocking position at Nhpum Ga and hold it against Japanese attacks, a conventional defensive action for which the unit had not been equipped. At times surrounded, the Marauders coordinated their own battalions in mutual support to break the siege after a series of fierce assaults by Japanese forces. At Nhpum Ga, the Marauders killed 400 Japanese soldiers, while suffering 57 killed in action, 302 wounded, and 379 incapacitated due to illness and exhaustion.

Of the unit's 200 mules, 75 were killed by artillery and mortar fire. A concurrent outbreak of amoebic dysentery (contracted after linking up with Chinese forces) further reduced their effective strength. Although the Marauders had previously avoided losses from this deadly disease (in part by use of halazone tablets and strict field sanitation procedures), their encampment with Chinese infantry, who used the rivers as latrines, proved their undoing (the Chinese troops, who always boiled their drinking water, were not seriously affected).

The disadvantages of supplying Marauders with a single K ration per day now made themselves felt, as the troops became increasingly malnourished; the onset of the rainy season combined with Japanese pressure and inhospitable terrain prevented many supply drops, exacerbating the problem. Even now, one K ration (three meals) per day was deemed adequate by General Stilwell's staff, augmented by occasional drops of dry rice, jam, bread, candy, and C rations. When encountering Chinese troops, many men began to barter their K ration cigarettes for rice and other foods.

=== Myitkyina and the end ===
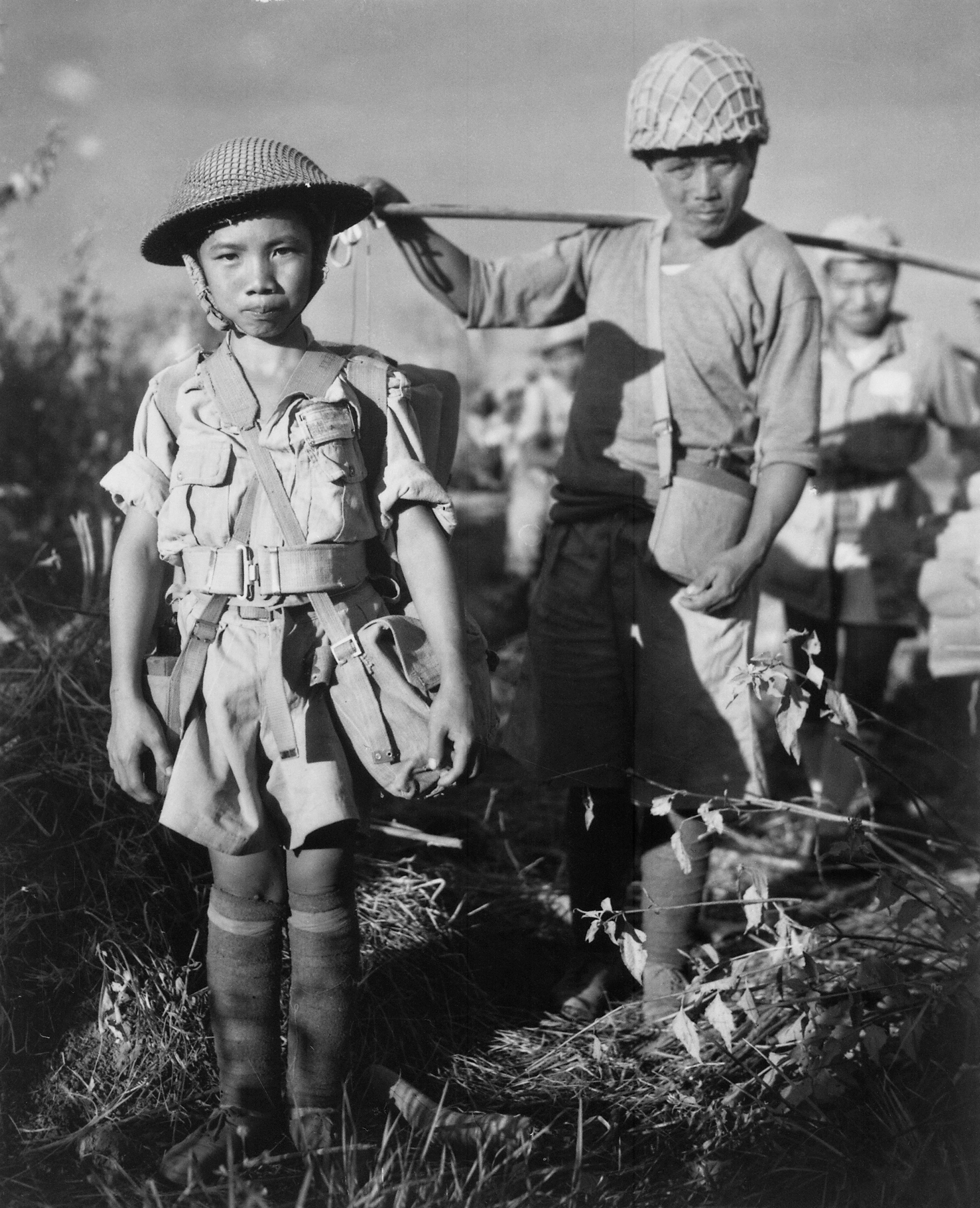
A 10-year-old Chinese soldier from a unit of the X Force, placed under Merrill and Charles N. Hunter's command, after the capture of the Myitkyina airfield.

On 17 May 1944, after a grueling 100-kilometre (62 mi) march over the 2,000-metre (6,600 ft) Kumon Mountain range (using mules for carrying supplies) to Myitkyina, approximately 1,300 remaining Marauders, along with elements of the 42nd and 150th Chinese Infantry Regiments of the X Force, attacked the unsuspecting Japanese at the Myitkyina airfield. The airfield assault on 17 May 1944 was a complete success; however, the town of Myitkyina could not immediately be taken with the forces on hand. An initial assault by elements of two Chinese regiments was repulsed with heavy losses. NCAC intelligence staff had once again badly underestimated Japanese troop strength in the town, which had steadily been reinforced and now possessed a garrison of some 4,600 well-armed and fanatical Japanese defenders.

Weakened by hunger, the 5307th continued fighting through the height of the monsoon season, worsening the situation; it also transpired that the area around Myitkyina had the largest reported incidence of scrub typhus, which some Marauders contracted after sleeping on infected areas of untreated ground, earth or grass. Racked with bloody dysentery and fevers, sleeping in the mud, Marauders alternately assaulted, then defended in a seesaw series of brutal conventional infantry engagements with Japanese forces. In a 1945 interview, Captain Fred O. Lyons, a Marauder officer, related the nature of the struggle:

By now my dysentery was so violent I was draining blood. Every one of the men was sick from one cause or another. My shoulders were worn raw from the pack straps, and I left the pack behind... The boys with me weren't in much better shape... A scout moving ahead suddenly held his rifle high in the air. That meant Enemy sighted... Then at last we saw them, coming down the railroad four abreast... The gunner crouched low over his tommy-gun and tightened down. Then the gun spoke. Down flopped a half-dozen Japs, then another half dozen. The [Japanese] column spewed from their marching formation into the bush. We grabbed up the gun and slid back into the jungle. Sometimes staggering, sometimes running, sometimes dragging, I made it back to camp. I was so sick I didn't care whether the Japs broke through or not; so sick I didn't worry any more about letting the colonel down. All I wanted was unconsciousness.

After reinforcement by an airlanded Chinese army division, the town finally fell to the Allies on 3 August 1944. The Japanese commander escaped with about 600 of his men; 187 Japanese soldiers were captured, and the rest, some 3,800 men, were killed in combat.

In their final mission, the Marauders suffered 272 killed, 955 wounded, and 980 evacuated for illness and disease; some men later died from cerebral malaria, amoebic dysentery, and/or scrub typhus. Marauders evacuated from the front lines were given jungle hammocks with protective sandfly netting and rain covers in which to sleep, equipment which might have prevented various diseases and illnesses had they been issued earlier in the campaign.

The casualties included General Merrill himself, who had suffered a second heart attack before going down with malaria. He was replaced by his second-in-command, Colonel Charles N. Hunter, who later prepared a scathing report on General Stilwell's medical evacuation policies (eventually prompting an Army Inspector General investigation and congressional hearings).

By the time the town of Myitkyina was taken, only about 200 surviving members of the original Marauders were present. A week after Myitkyina fell, on 10 August 1944, the 5307th was disbanded with a final total of 130 combat-effective officers and men (out of the original 2,997). Of the 2,750 to enter Burma, only two were left alive who had never been hospitalized with wounds or major illness. None of the horses and only 41 mules survived.

== Legacy ==
Honoring the Marauders' legacy through the 75th Ranger Regiment's iconography

The Regiment's distinctive unit insignia honors the legacy of the Marauders by replicating the design of their SSI

The red, white, blue, khaki, green, and orange colors of the Marauder's six teams are incorporated in the regiment's beret flashes

In slightly more than five months of combat, the Marauders had advanced 750 miles (1,210 km) through some of the harshest jungle terrain in the world, fought in five major engagements (Walawbum, Shaduzup, Inkangahtawng, Nhpum Ga, and Myitkyina) and engaged in combat with the Japanese Army on thirty-two separate occasions, including two conventional defensive battles with enemy forces for which the force had not been intended or equipped. Battling Japanese soldiers, hunger, fevers, and disease, they had traversed more jungle terrain on their long-range missions than any other U.S. Army formation during World War II.

The men of Merrill's Marauders enjoyed the rare distinction of having each soldier awarded the Bronze Star. In June 1944, the 5307th Composite Unit (provisional) was awarded the Distinguished Unit Citation:

The unit must display such gallantry, determination, and esprit de corps in accomplishing its mission under extremely difficult and hazardous conditions as to set it apart and above other units participating in the same campaign.

On 10 August 1944 the Marauders were consolidated into the 475th Infantry, which continued service in northern Burma as a component of the brigade-sized MARS Task Force until February 1945. On 21 June 1954 the 475th Infantry was re-designated the 75th Infantry from which descended the 75th Ranger Regiment.

The commander of the 2nd Battalion of the Marauders, Colonel George A. McGee, was inducted into the Ranger Hall of Fame (1992) for extraordinary valor and exemplary service. The commander of the 3rd Battalion Colonel Charles E. Beach II was inducted into the Ranger Hall of Fame (1995) for his distinguished service and valor in combat. Roy H. Matsumoto (1993), Henry Gosho (1997), and Grant Hirabayashi (2004), Japanese-American interpreters for the Marauders were also inducted into the Ranger Hall of Fame.

On 5 December 2019, the United States Senate passed S. 743, the Merrill's Marauders Congressional Gold Medal Act, legislation to honor the Marauders' extraordinary service. On 22 September 2020, the House of Representatives also passed the bill by unanimous consent. The Congressional Gold Medal is the highest expression by the Congress of national appreciation for distinguished achievements and contributions to the country. On 6 October, the Bill approving the medal award was sent to the White House for its final signature.

As of 31 December 2020, seven Marauders were still alive. By May 2022, this number had dwindled to just two, Gabriel Kinney and Russell Hamler. Gabriel Kinney died on 11 December 2022, at the age of 101. Russell Hamler died at a veterans hospital in Pittsburgh, Pennsylvania, on 26 December 2023, at the age of 99.

Company S-2 within the Texas A&M University Corps of Cadets is named after Merrill's Marauders.

== See also ==
- China Burma India Theater
- Former United States special operations units
- Ledo Road
- Merrill's Marauders (1962 film)
- Objective, Burma! (1945 film)
- Tom T. Chamales
- Roy Matsumoto
- Charlton Ogburn
- David Richardson
- Samuel V. Wilson
- United States Army Rangers
- Burma Campaign
- Chindits
- Marine Raiders
- First Special Service Force
- 124th Cavalry Regiment (United States)

== Bibliography ==
- Baker, Alan, Merrill's Marauders, Ballantine (1972).
- Bjorge, Gary J. "Merrill's Marauders: Combined Operations in Northern Burma in 1944" Army History No. 34 (Spring/Summer 1995), pp. 12–28 online
- Kearny, Cresson H. (Major), Jungle Snafus...And Remedies, Oregon Institute of Science and Medicine (1996), ISBN 1-884067-10-7
- George, John B. (Lt. Col.), Shots Fired in Anger, NRA Publications (1981), ISBN 0-935998-42-X, 978-0935998429
- Hopkins, James Spearhead, Merrill's Marauders Society (2000). ISBN 0-8018-6404-6.
- Hoyt, Edwin, Merrill's Marauders, Pinnacle Books (1980). ISBN 0-523-40671-1.
- Latimer, John, Burma: The Forgotten War, John Murray, (2004). ISBN 0-7195-6576-6
- Mortimer, Gavin. Merrill's Marauders: The Untold Story of Unit Galahad and the Toughest Special Forces Mission of World War II (Zenith Press, 2013).
- Randle, Fred E., and William W. Hughes. Hell on Land, Disaster at Sea: The Story of Merrill's Marauders and the Sinking of the Rhona (Turner Publishing Company, 2002).
- Weston, Logan, "The Fightin' Preacher", Vision Press (1992) ISBN 0-9628579-7-1.
- MERRILL'S MARAUDERS February – May 1944. United States Army Center of Military History. 1990 [1945]. CMH Pub 100-4. Archived from the original on 26 March 2015.
