= Charlton Ogburn =

American journalist and author (1911–1998)

- Born: Charlton Ogburn; 15 March 1911; Atlanta, Georgia, U.S.
- Died: 19 October 1998 (aged 87); Beaufort, South Carolina, U.S.
- Occupations: Soldier, writer
- Years active: 1932–1998
- Notable work: The Marauders; The Winter Beach; The Mysterious William Shakespeare

Charlton Ogburn Jr. (15 March 1911 – 19 October 1998) was an American writer, most notably of memoirs and non-fiction works. Before he established himself as a writer he served in the US army, and then as a State Department official, specialising in South-East Asian affairs.

In his later years he was best known as an advocate of the Oxfordian theory of Shakespeare authorship, leading the revival of public interest in the theory in the 1980s. He wrote over a dozen books and numerous magazine articles.

== Life ==
Ogburn was the son of lawyer Charlton Greenwood Ogburn and writer Dorothy Ogburn née Stevens. His uncle was the sociologist William Fielding Ogburn. He was raised in Savannah and New York City, graduated from Harvard University in 1932 and wrote and worked in publishing.

During World War II he joined military intelligence, serving in the China Burma India Theater, most notably as communications officer for Merrill's Marauders. He left with the rank of captain. He returned to the US to begin a career with the State Department. From 1946 to 1949, he worked at the Division of South-East Asian Affairs. He went on to work at the Department of State. He held several posts, including Political Advisor to the United States Delegation to the United Nations Security Council's Committee of Good Offices for the Indonesian Dispute.

Ogburn was among the first State Department officials to explicitly oppose the growing U.S. involvement in the First Indochina War, which would later evolve into the Vietnam War. In 1950 he wrote a memo in which he predicted that Ho Chi Minh would not "wilt" under the impact of U.S. aid to the colonial French forces, and that any military victory would simply send Ho's troops "underground until a more propitious occasion presented itself". Ogburn also unsuccessfully opposed the U.S. policy of supporting the Vietnamese monarchy of Bảo Đại.

After the success of his story "Merrill's Marauders", a Harper's Magazine cover story in 1957, Harper & Bros. offered an advance for a book and he left the government to write on a full-time basis in 1957.

Failing health in later years led to Ogburn's death in 1998. His papers are kept in archives at Emory University in Atlanta.

== Family ==
Ogburn was married twice. With his first wife, he had one son, Charlton Ogburn, III). The couple divorced, after which Charlton III's name was changed by his mother to William Fielding Ogburn. He was later known as Will Aldis. Ogburn, Jr. then married Vera M. Weidman in 1951, with whom he had two daughters, Nyssa and Holly Ogburn.

== Works ==
=== The Marauders ===
For most of Ogburn's life, his best-known work was The Marauders (1959), a first person account of the Burma Campaign in World War II. It was later filmed as Merrill's Marauders (1962).

Versions of the following quotation are frequently misattributed to Petronius.

We trained hard ... but it seemed that every time we were beginning to form up into teams we would be reorganized. I was to learn later in life that we tend to meet any new situation by reorganizing; and a wonderful method it can be for creating the illusion of progress while producing confusion, inefficiency, and demoralization.

In fact it is from the magazine article "Merrill's Marauders" (Harper's Magazine, 1957) that earned Ogburn his book contract. In full, it reads thus:

We trained hard, but it seemed that every time we were beginning to form up into teams we would be reorganized. Presumably the plans for our employment were being changed. I was to learn later in life that, perhaps because we are so good at organizing, we tend as a nation to meet any new situation by reorganizing; and a wonderful method it can be for creating the illusion of progress while producing confusion, inefficiency and demoralization.

=== The Winter Beach and other works ===
Ogburn won the John Burroughs Medal in 1967 for The Winter Beach. His account of travels along the largely deserted northeastern shore is considered a classic of nature-writing. Stewart Udall wrote, "In The Winter Beach, literary courage, eloquence, and wisdom have, I think, brought about a triumph." Roger Tory Peterson said, "Ogburn has written a most extraordinary book... he is a very sensitive, reflective writer in the Thoreauvian tradition". In 1976, his book, The Adventure of Birds was published with drawings by Matthew Kalmenoff.

Ogburn also wrote fiction. He began his literary career with "The White Falcon", a story published by Houghton Mifflin in 1955. His short novel The Bridge was a work of young adult fiction with illustrations by Evaline Ness. It told the story of an elderly man and his teenage granddaughter battling to preserve their way of life, threatened by greedy relatives and a dangerous storm. Another book for young adults was Big Caesar, illustrated by Joe Krush, a story about a boy's interest in an old truck. In 1965 he published The Gold of the River Sea, a novel based on his early experiences traveling in Brazil.

=== Oxfordian theory ===
Today Ogburn is best known for several books and articles on the Shakespeare authorship question, continuing the passion of his parents, who had written several books on the topic including This Star of England: "William Shakes-speare" Man of the Renaissance (Coward-McCann, 1952). Ogburn junior's last and most well-known book, The Mysterious William Shakespeare: The Myth and the Reality (New York: Dodd, Mead, 1984), led directly to an appearance on William F. Buckley's Firing Line, followed by a 1987 Frontline documentary on the authorship question narrated by Al Austin, and mock trials in the U.S. and Britain.

More than a thousand people attended the moot court case sponsored by American University in 1987. Three US Supreme Court justices —John Paul Stevens, Harry Blackmun and William J. Brennan—heard arguments in favor of the orthodox view of Shakespearean authorship and the Oxfordian theory that attributes the works to Edward de Vere, 17th Earl of Oxford (1550–1604). Although the justices held in favor of the traditional account of authorship, Justice Stevens later wrote an article supporting Ogburn's position, "The Shakespeare Canon of Statutory Construction", University of Pennsylvania Law Review (1991).

Ogburn's book reinvigorated the Oxfordian theory; inspired a succession of articles in The New Yorker (1988), Atlantic Monthly (1991), and Harper's Magazine (1999) and provoked a nationally broadcast three-hour teleconference on the topic Uncovering Shakespeare: An Update with moderator William F. Buckley, Jr.

== See also ==
- Colonel Charles N. Hunter author of Galahad (San Antonio, TX: Naylor Co., 1963), a book about Merrill's Marauders and the commanding officer frequently mentioned in Ogburn's book The Marauders.
