= List of Japanese American servicemen and servicewomen in World War II =

This list contains the names of notable Japanese Americans who served in the United States Military and Intelligence Services in World War II.

== A ==
- John F. Aiso (1909–1987)
- Bumpei Akaji (1921–2002)
- George Aratani (1917–2013)
- George Ariyoshi (1926–2026)
- Koji Ariyoshi (1914–1976)

== B ==
- Paul Bannai (1920–2019)
- Tadao Beppu (1919–1993)

== F ==
- Jerry Fujikawa (1912–1983)
- Frank Fujita (1921–1996)
- S. Neil Fujita (1921–2010)
- Robert Fukuda (1922–2013)
- Harry K. Fukuhara (1920–2015)

== H ==
- Barney F. Hajiro (1916–2011)
- Mikio Hasemoto (1916–1943)
- Joe Hayashi (1920–1945)
- Shizuya Hayashi (1917–2008)
- Thomas Taro Higa (1916–1985)
- Takashi "Halo" Hirose (1923–2002)

== I ==
- Chiyoki Ikeda (1920–1960)
- Daniel Inouye (1924–2012)
- Dale Ishimoto (1923–2004)
- Susumu Ito (1919–2005)

== K ==
- Bill Kajikawa (1912–2010)
- Ben Kamihira (1925–2004)
- Isao Kikuchi (1921–2017)
- Keichi Kimura (1914–1988)
- Yeiki Kobashigawa (1917–2005)
- Arthur Komori (1915–2000)
- Robert T. Kuroda (1922–1944)
- Ben Kuroki (1917–2015)

== M ==
- Mike Masaoka (1915–1991)
- Fujio Matsuda (1924–2020)
- John Matsudaira (1922–2007)
- Roy Matsumoto (1913–2014)
- Spark Matsunaga (1916–1990)
- Wataru Misaka (1923–2019)
- Hiroshi H. Miyamura (1925–2022)
- Jack Mizuha (1913–1986)
- Kaoru Moto (1917–1992)
- Sadao Munemori (1922–1945)
- Kiyoshi K. Muranaga (1922–1944)
- Shig Murao (1926–1999)

== N ==
- Bill Naito (1925–1996)
- Nakada brothers
- Masato Nakae (1917–1998)
- Shinyei Nakamine (1922–1944)
- Edward Nakamura (1922–1997)
- William K. Nakamura (1922–1944)
- Lane Nakano (1925–2005)
- Joe M. Nishimoto (1919–1944)

== O ==
- Tetsuo Ochikubo (1923–1975)
- Ben Oda (1915–1984)
- Kenje Ogata (1919–2012)
- Allan M. Ohata (1918–1977)
- John Okada (1923–1971)
- James K. Okubo (1920–1967)
- Yukio Okutsu (1921–2003)
- Frank H. Ono (1923–1980)
- Kazuo Otani (1918–1944)

== S ==
- Albert Saijo (1926–2011)
- Richard Sakakida (1920–1996)
- Harold Sakata (1920–1982)
- George T. Sakato (1921–2015)
- George Shibata (1926–1987)
- Bell M. Shimada (1922–1958)
- Tak Shindo (1922–2002)
- Kobe Shoji (1920–2004)

== T ==
- Shinkichi Tajiri (1923–2009)
- James Takemori (1926–2015)
- Francis Takemoto (1912–2002)
- Chuzo Tamotzu (1888–1975)
- Takuma Tanada (1919–2018)
- Ted T. Tanouye (1919–1944)
- Teruto Tsubota (1922 –2013)
- Ted Tsukiyama (1920–2019)
- George Tsutakawa (1910–1997)

== U ==
- Yosh Uchida (1920–2024)

== Y ==
- Taro Yamamoto (1919–1994)
- Mitsu Yashima (1908–1988)
- Taro Yashima (1908–1994)
- Karl Yoneda (1906–1999)
- Nadao Yoshinaga (1919–2009)
- George Yuzawa (1915–2011)

== See also ==
- Japanese American service in World War II
  - 442nd Infantry Regiment
  - 100th Infantry Battalion
  - Varsity Victory Volunteers
  - Military Intelligence Service
  - Lost Battalion
- Go for Broke Monument
