= Joint Intelligence Center =

Military intelligence agency

A Joint Intelligence Center (JIC) is a focal point for military intelligence gathered by the different intelligence agencies of the United States and administered by the Defense Intelligence Agency (DIA). The intelligence center of the joint force headquarters. The joint intelligence center is responsible for providing and producing the intelligence required to support the joint force commander and staff, components, task forces and elements, and the national intelligence community.

There are Joint Intelligence Centers in the United States Central Command at Tampa, Florida, the United States Indo-Pacific Command in Hawaii, and in Europe. The Joint Analysis Center serves as a JIC for the United States European Command.

== History ==
The United States declared war in 1941 with two separate organizations gathering and distributing intelligence for operational planning. The Office of Naval Intelligence (ONI) had been formed in 1882; while the Army's Military Information Division had been established in 1885, and reorganized in 1917 as the Military Intelligence Division (MID). Although the Commandant of the Marine Corps proposed a joint effort in March 1942 interservice rivalry prevented formation of a Joint Intelligence Agency (JIA). In preparation for the Guadalcanal Campaign the Navy established an intelligence center at Pearl Harbor in July 1942. Consolidated intelligence collection began as US forces went on the offensive in 1943 and 1944.

Formation of Joint Intelligence Collection Agencies (JICA) began in August 1943. North Africa (JICANA) later became Mediterranean (JICAMED). Africa-Middle East was (JICAME). China-India-Burma (JICACIB) later split into China (JICAC) and India-Burma. JICAs transmitted information to the Joint Intelligence Agency Reception Center (JIARC) in Washington DC where a Joint Electronic Information Agency (JEIA) utilized coded radio transmissions to reduce dissemination time for important intelligence from 60 days to 16 hours. Some theatre commanders resisted coordinated efforts, and General Douglas MacArthur's Southwest Pacific Area (SWPA) never formed a joint intelligence operation.

In September 1943 the first designated JIC was Admiral Chester W. Nimitz's Pacific Ocean Areas JIC (JICPOA). JICPOA integrated the staff and independent intelligence distribution system of the Navy's earlier Pearl Harbor intelligence center and was the largest independent theatre intelligence operation. Supreme Headquarters Allied Expeditionary Force JIC (SHAEFJIC) was formed in July 1944 following the Normandy landings. By that time JICPOA was coordinating production and distribution of psychological warfare propaganda leaflets to encourage surrender of Japanese soldiers in isolated island garrisons.

Demobilization caused abandonment of the JIC system as the individual services sought to retain independent staffing. The JICAs were deactivated between August and December 1945, and JICPOA was disbanded in October 1945. US European theatre intelligence operations were refocused as the Joint Intelligence Objectives Agency (JIOA) created in June 1945 for Operation Paperclip to identify and transport German and Austrian scientists to the United States. Military disinterest in joint United States Department of Defense (DOD) intelligence operations encouraged creation of the civilian Central Intelligence Agency (CIA) in 1947. Although the DIA was formed in 1961, reestablishment of JICs required elimination of the Army Intelligence Agency (AIA) by the Defense Intelligence Reorganization Act on 10 April 1992 to prosecute the Gulf War in conformance with the Goldwater–Nichols Act of 1986.
