= Military Intelligence Division (United States) =

Branch of the United States Army (1917–1942)

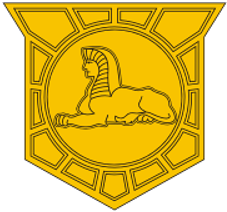
- Branch Insignia
- Active: 1917-1942
- Country: United States
- Branch: U.S. Army

The Military Intelligence Division was the military intelligence branch of the United States Army and United States Department of War from May 1917 (as the Military Intelligence Section, then Military Intelligence Branch in February 1918, then Military Intelligence Division in June 1918) to March 1942. It was preceded by the Military Information Division and the General Staff Second Division and in 1942 was reorganised as the Military Intelligence Service.

== History ==
=== World War One ===
- Corps of Interpreters
- American Expeditionary Force
- G-2
- Corps of Intelligence Police

=== Inter-War Years ===
Army G2 Black Chamber MI Officer Reserve Corps Signal Intelligence Service Devolution to G2 and S2

In the first half of 1941, Sherman Miles became a senior member of Army Chief of Staff General George C. Marshall's general staff. Miles was assigned as "Assistant Chief of Staff G-2", i.e., the head of the Military Intelligence Division.

The MID greatly expanded during his time as G-2, but, as Miles put it, "always in a piecemeal manner". Qualified cryptography personnel were scarce, and Japanese-speaking personnel were also hard to come by. Miles' suggestions to set up an espionage service were ignored until June 1941, when U.S. President Franklin D. Roosevelt appointed William J. Donovan as Coordinator of Information. Donovan's unit would eventually become the OSS, but it was independent from the MID and needed time to mature, which made for a difficult collaboration (if not to say a rivalry) between the MID and the OSS from the beginning and continuing throughout the war.

The attack on Pearl Harbor ended Miles' career in the General Staff. MID very much relied on intercepted Japanese radio messages. The decoded "Magic" messages were top-secret and circulated only in a very select circle of ten people comprising the General Staffs of the Army and the Navy, the Secretary of War, and the President. No coherent analysis of these messages was done. The warnings that the General Staff sent to Hawaii failed to stress the urgency because MID themselves did not consider the contents of the "Magic" intercepts received prior to the attack as particularly significant at that time. In addition, communication channels in the U.S. military were convoluted due to the split commands of Army and Navy, each with their own intelligence branch, and the last message to Hawaii before the attack was delayed and was decoded at Hawaii only after the attack had already begun.

Ten days after the attack on Pearl Harbor, Miles was sent on an inspection tour through South America to survey installations there and to make recommendations for military assistance to the Latin American countries; Brigadier General Raymond E. Lee became Acting Assistant Chief of Staff G-2 .

=== World War Two ===
In March 1942, the Military Intelligence Division was reorganized as the Military Intelligence Service (MIS). It was tasked with collecting, analyzing, and disseminating intelligence, and absorbed the Fourth Army Intelligence School. Originally comprising just 26 people, 16 of them officers, it was quickly expanded to include 342 officers and 1,000 enlisted men and civilians garrisoned at Camp Savage in Minnesota.

Initially, the MID included:

- an Administrative Group
- an Intelligence Group
- a Counterintelligence Group
- an Operations Group

In May 1942, Colonel Alfred McCormack, established the Special Branch of MIS which specialised in COMINT.

== See also ==
- G-2 (intelligence)
- Military Intelligence Corps (United States Army)
- United States Army Intelligence and Security Command
- Office of Naval Intelligence
- Military Information Division (United States)
- Military Intelligence Service (United States)
- United States Army Intelligence Agency
- United States Army Security Agency
- United States Navy Communications Intelligence Organization
- Fleet Radio Unit, Melbourne
- Allied Intelligence Bureau
