= Japanese Americans (miniseries) =

Japanese TV miniseries

99 Years of Love 〜Japanese Americans〜 (99年の愛〜JAPANESE AMERICANS〜, Kyūjūkyūnen no Ai Japanīzu Amerikanzu) is a five-episode Japanese-language TV miniseries produced by TBS for its 60th anniversary announced in 3–7 November 2010, starring Tsuyoshi Kusanagi and Yukie Nakama, and sponsored by Toyota and Panasonic.

== Plot ==
In 2010, two Japanese Americans on "HIRAMATSU FARM", Jiro Hiramatsu (Tsunehiko Kamijo) and his late older brother's wife Shinobu Hiramatsu (Kaoru Yachigusa) were watching Ichiro Suzuki play baseball at the stadium in Seattle. They were invited to meet their younger sister who was separated from the family in 1940, Sachi Ota (Meguko Kishi). Sachi's daughter-in-law, Keiko Ota (Keiko Horiuchi) made the case that Sachi will be able to meet Jiro and Shinobu for the first time in seventy years. Firstly, Sachi rejected meeting her family living in the U.S. again, because she was thinking that she and her late older sister were cast out from her parents. However, Sachi wanted to meet Jiro and Shinobu because of her having the operation for breast cancer. Sachi hadn't told her grandchild and Keiko's son Naoto Ota (Tsubasa Kato) who is a fan of the baseball player Ichiro Suzuki that she was born and raised in the U.S.

Japanese Americans tells the story of a family of Japanese immigrants who moved to the United States. In 1912, the end of the Meiji period, Chokichi Hiramatsu (younger role: Tsuyoshi Kusanagi) moved to the United States with Kazuma Nonaka (Ukon Ichikawa), his wife Kinue Nonaka (Yo Yoshida) and two children because of poverty. However, anti-Japanese immigrants sentiment and believing the Yellow Peril was raising in the U.S., because of not only the characteristics of Japanese immigrants like working too much and having many children but also the Japanese victory over the Russo-Japanese War.

Chokichi worked at the canning factory introduced by Isamu Okada (Nenji Kobayashi) who is a relative man of Nonaka, but he resigned that and worked various farmlands as a day laborer during seven years in order to send his salaries to his family living in Shimane.

Later, he married Tomo Murakami (younger role: Ayako Imoto) who came from Niimi, Okayama recommended by Nonaka who had run a laundry in Seattle with his wife and children after giving up farming. Properly speaking, her elder sister intended to marry Chokichi, but she moved to Tokyo with her partner, so Tomo married Chokichi as her elder sister's substitute. Chokichi and Tomo were given vast farmland by the American elderly woman whom a son lives in New York because her only son wouldn't become a farmer. However, Chokichi and Tomo who were Issei couple couldn't get U.S. nationality. They had first boy, Nisei child who could acquire the citizenship of the United States and they also wanted their first son to become a Japanese American man like a bridge between both countries Japan and the U.S.

Chokichi Hiramatsu (older role: Kiichi Nakai) and his wife Tomo Hiramatsu (older role: Pinko Izumi) had four children who could acquire the U.S. nationality as Nisei, two sons and two daughters, first son Ichiro Hiramatsu (double role: Tsuyoshi Kusanagi), second son Jiro Hiramatsu (Kenichi Matsuyama), first daughter Shizu Hiramatsu (Saki Terashima), second daughter Sachi Hiramatsu (Umika Kawashima). Ichiro had studying the law at the university to become a lawyer who helps Japanese Americans who are discriminated against by white Americans. He met Japan's consular official's daughter Shinobu Matsuzawa (Yukie Nakama) there.

Chokichi made his two daughters Shizu and Sachi go back to his home in Shimane, Japan, but Chokichi's older brother Ryosuke Hiramatsu (Toranosuke Kato) sent Shizu to her aunt Fusa (Eri Fuse) living in Hiroshima, he also sent Sachi to her aunt Toki (Kaoru Sugita) living in Okinawa separately from each other. When the war between Japan and the U.S. broke out, Shizu and Sachi were bullied by the school's students and their aunt's family, being told to "Go Back To America !" because of the enemy country's persons.

Shinobu's father consular official Matsuzawa was ordered to return Japan from the consulate in the US, but Shinobu ran away from the Japan-US exchange ship, swimming in the sea because she loved Ichiro and wanted to marry him, she engaged in the hard work of farming to become Ichiro's wife. Ichiro's mother Tomo allowed that, but Ichiro's father Chokichi didn't firstly.

When the attack on Pearl Harbor (Pacific War) broke out on 7 December 1941, Chokichi was arrested by the FBI as an enemy alien. President Franklin D. Roosevelt ordered the policy of the internment of Japanese Americans living in the West Coast, not only Issei who couldn't acquire the United States nationality but also Nisei who obtained the U.S. citizenship, Japanese Americans encountered racism against Japanese diasporas and segregation. Tomo, Jiro, Ichiro and Shinobu were confined in the Manzanar internment camp, they shared one room with a gardener in California Daisuke Komiya (Takashi Sasano) and his son Hiroshi Komiya (Akiyoshi Nakao). Japanese Americans in the internment camps managed the environment of living like the toilets, the cafeterias, the schools and the farmland themselves.

The U.S. government asked two main questions so-called the 'Loyalty Registration', the Question #27 asked: "Are you willing to serve in the armed forces of the United States on combat duty wherever ordered?" and Question #28 asked: "Will you swear unqualified allegiance to the United States of America and faithfully defend the United States from any or all attack by foreign or domestic forces, and forswear any form of allegiance or obedience to the Japanese emperor, or any other foreign government, power, or organization?", for Japanese Americans in order to send them to the front in the WWII because of the shortage of the soldiers. Tomo wanted her children, especially Ichiro to answer "No" and "No". However, not only Tomo but also Jiro, Ichiro and Shinobu answered "Yes" and "Yes". Ichiro joined the 442nd Infantry Regiment of the U.S. Army to live as Americans. After starting of his military exercises, Chokichi was discharged and sent his family confined in Manzanar. Daisuke Komiya and Nonaka couple were sent to the Tule Lake Segregation Center and were deported to Japan because they answered "No" and "No".

Ichiro was killed in the Vosges Mountains, France, Western Front of the European theatre of World War II as a soldier of the 442nd Infantry Regiment of the U.S. Army. He received the Bronze Star Medal after his death in the battle. Shinobu had given birth of a boy Ken Hiramatsu, but Ken had never seen his father Ichiro.

In the ending of WWII, Sachi experienced the Battle of Okinawa as the member of the girls students' nursing. After the suicide of the General of the Imperial Japanese Army Mitsuru Ushijima, she was helped by Hiroshi Komiya who was a translator in Okinawa and the Corporal of the United States Marine Corps. Shizu experienced the atomic bombing of Hiroshima on 6 August 1945. After the war, Sachi went to Hiroshima where devastated by the atomic bomb to look for Shizu in near hospital with Hiroshi during his ten holidays. Sachi run away from the hospital with Shizu, they went to Kyoto where wasn't devastated by the bombing. Sachi found her job that related with the clothing in Tokyo, but Shizu died by the illness caused by atomic bomb radiation in July 1947.

On 15 August 1945, Japanese Emperor made a radio address to announce that the Japanese Government had accepted the Potsdam Declaration demanding the unconditional surrender of the Japanese military at the end of World War II. Chokichi committed suicide for the pride of being a Japanese like believing the victory of Japan in the war because of the shock of the surrender of Japan.

== Reception ==
In the beginning of 2011, this drama's screening was held for three days in Seattle and Los Angeles which served as the stage for these works.

These two-episode digest versions produces by TBS were announced in 26–27 December 2011, because these works received "Tokyo International Drama Award 2011 Grand Prix".

== See also ==
- History of Japanese Americans
- Day of Remembrance (Japanese Americans)
- Japanese American service in World War II
  - 442nd Infantry Regiment
  - 100th Infantry Battalion
  - Lost Battalion
- List of Japanese American Servicemen and Servicewomen in World War II
