= Tsubota =

Tsubota (written: 坪田) is a Japanese surname. Notable people with the surname include:

- Kazumi Tsubota (坪田 和美) (born 1956), Japanese footballer
- Teruto Tsubota (1922–2013), American humanitarian and United States Marine
- Yuki Tsubota (born 1994), Canadian skier
