= Camp Savage =

WWII school to teach the Japanese language

Coordinates: 44°46′41″N 93°21′7″W

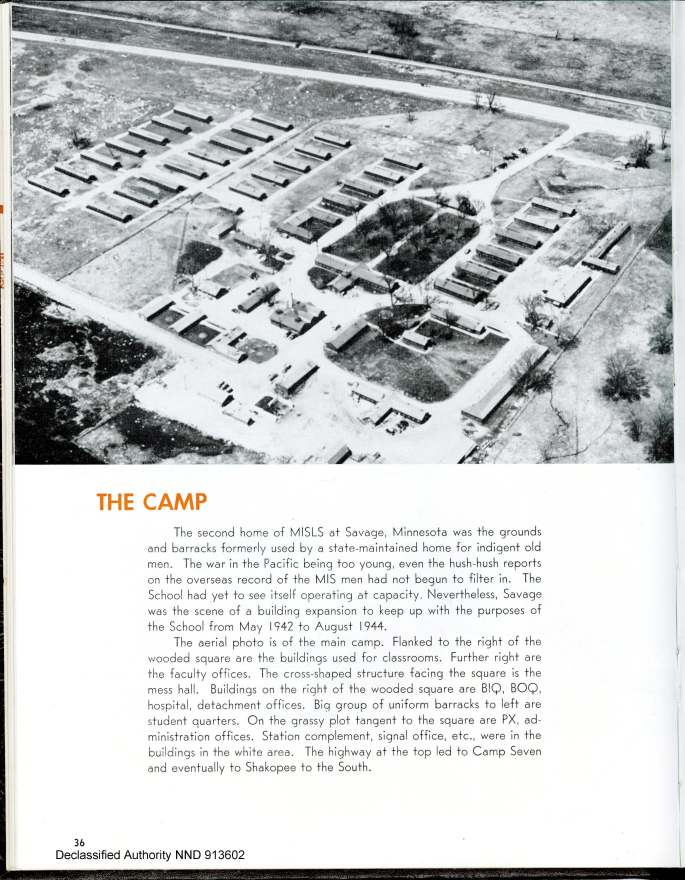
The MISLS Album, 1946, p. 36.

Camp Savage is the former site of the U.S. Military Intelligence Service language school operating during World War II. The school itself was established in San Francisco, but was moved in 1942 to Savage, Minnesota.

The purpose of the school was to teach the Japanese language to military personnel and civilians involved in the war effort. This skill could then be used to interrogate prisoners of war, translate captured documents, serve as interpreters with Japanese civilians, and aid in the American war effort. The training program usually lasted six to nine months. The program was later moved to Fort Snelling in St. Paul, Minnesota.

== History ==
As relations worsened with Japan in the build-up to the war, a group of officers with previous tours of duty in Japan including Rufus S. Bratton and Sidney Mashbir saw the need for an intelligence unit, that would be able to understand the Japanese language. The possibility of using Japanese Americans, or Nisei, with language skills was suggested as the number of Caucasian personnel qualified in Japanese was almost non-existent, and with the crisis rapidly approaching, there was little time to train additional Caucasian personnel. Lt Col John Weckerling and Capt. Kai E. Rasmussen, returning from posts in Tokyo were tapped to head up the school. Nisei soldiers John F. Aiso and Arthur Kaneko, were found to be qualified linguists and recruited along with two civilian instructors, Akira Oshida and Shigeya Kihara, and became the Military Intelligence Service Language School (MISLS)'s first instructors.

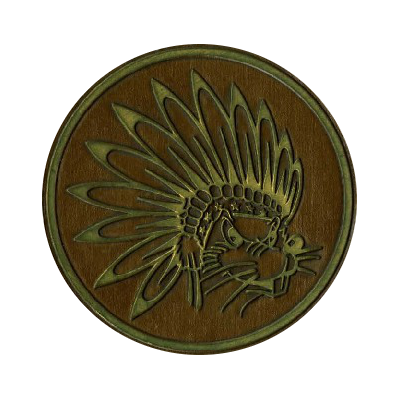
The unofficial logo of the MIS Language School at Camp Savage.

The MISLS (initially known as the Fourth Army Intelligence School) began operation with an initial budget of $2,000 in November 1941, about a month before the Japanese bombed Pearl Harbor. The first class of 60 students began their training at the Presidio of San Francisco, graduating 45 students in May 1942.

Following the attack on Pearl Harbor, anti-Japanese sentiment pushed President Roosevelt to issue Executive Order 9066, forcing the removal of anyone with as little as 1/16th Japanese ancestry from the West Coast of the United States. Minnesota's Governor Harold Stassen offered up Camp Savage, a former Works Progress Administration facility to host the MIS Language School. The school moved to Minnesota in June 1942. The move offered larger facilities, and they faced less anti-Japanese prejudice as the move resolved the complications of training Japanese-American students in the coastal areas they were prohibited.

The initial class of 200 students and 18 instructors convened on June 1, 1942. By August 1944, the program had outgrown its facilities and moved to nearby Fort Snelling. After the war, graduates of the language school translated and worked as interpreters at war crimes tribunals and served myriad roles in the occupation of Japan.

At its peak in early 1946, the MISLS had 160 instructors and 3,000 students studying in more than 125 classrooms. The twenty-first and final commencement at Fort Snelling in June 1946 featured the graduation of 307 students, bringing the total number of MISLS graduates to more than 6,000. What began as an experimental military intelligence language-training program launched on a budget of $2,000 eventually became the forerunner of the Defense Language Institute for the tens of thousands of linguists who serve American interests throughout the world.

Many of the Minnesota-trained Japanese-American soldiers decided to stay put. The 1940 census shows that 51 people of Japanese heritage lived in Minnesota, most of them who were railroad workers. By 1950, that number had grown more than 20-fold to 1,049. The War Relocation Authority managed resettlement processes for many Japanese-American soldiers.

== Demographics ==
=== Women ===
51 women graduated from the MISLS at Fort Snelling, including 13 women who deployed to Tokyo to work in General Douglas MacArthur's office during the Occupation of Japan after World War II.

== See also ==
- Japanese American internment
- Japanese language education in the United States
