= Nakada brothers =

The nine Nakada brothers were World War II soldiers of Japanese American descent who served in various roles. The Nakada family had more sons in the U.S. military than any other family during the war.

The nine brothers were:

- James Nakada, Military Intelligence Service (MIS),
- John Nakada, MIS,
- Minoru Nakada, MIS,
- Stephen Nakada, Military Intelligence Service Language School,
- Yoshiano Nakada, Office of Strategic Services
- Saburo Nakada, MIS
- Yoshio Nakada, MIS
- George Nakada, 100th/442nd Infantry Regiment, Company K.
- Isao Henry "Hank" Nakada, (born October 12, 1922, died March 13, 2008),100th/442nd Infantry Regiment, Company I.

All survived the war.
