= Military Intelligence Service (United States) =

- MIS Unit insignia
- Active: 1941–1945
- Disbanded: 1946
- Country: United States
- Branch: United States Army
- Type: Military Intelligence
- Role: Translation, interpretation, and interrogation
- Size: 1,000 +/-
- Garrison/HQ: Presidio of Monterey, Monterey, California
- Nickname: "Yankee Samurai"
- Engagements: Guadalcanal, Buna–Gona, Attu, New Georgia, New Guinea, Bougainville, Tarawa, New Britain, Burma, Kwajalein, Admiralty Islands, Gilbert and Marshall Islands, Philippine Sea, Aitape–Wewak, Saipan, Peleliu, Leyte Gulf, Lingayen Gulf, Corregidor, Luzon, Iwo Jima, Okinawa, Occupation of Japan
- Decorations: Presidential Unit Citation; Meritorious Unit Commendation

Commanders
- Notable commanders: Col Kai Rasmussen; Lt Col John F. Aiso

Insignia
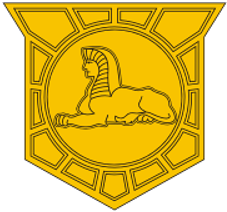
- Branch insignia

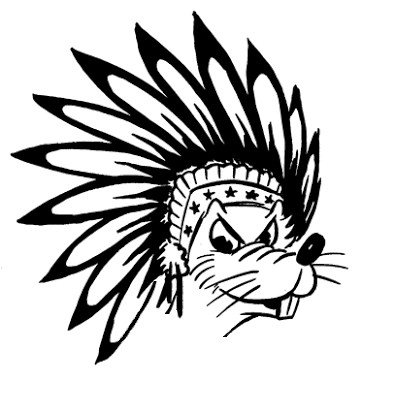
- Unofficial MISLS insignia

The Military Intelligence Service (Japanese: アメリカ陸軍情報部, America Rikugun Jōhōbu) was a World War II U.S. military unit consisting of two branches, the Japanese American unit (described here) and the German-Austrian unit based at Camp Ritchie, best known as the "Ritchie Boys". The unit described here was primarily composed of Nisei (second-generation Japanese Americans) who were trained as linguists. Graduates of the MIS language school (MISLS) were attached to other military units to provide translation, interpretation, and interrogation services.

"President Harry Truman called the Japanese Americans in the Military Intelligence Service (M.I.S.) the 'human secret weapon for the U.S. Armed Forces' against the Japanese in the Pacific. Major General Charles Willoughby said, 'The Nisei shortened the Pacific War by two years and saved possibly a million American lives.'"

They served with the United States Army, Navy, and Marine Corps, as well as with British, Australian, New Zealand, Canadian, Chinese, and Indian combat units fighting the Japanese.

General Hayes Adlai Kroner was Chief of MIS at the War Department for most of the War.

== History ==
The U.S. Army long recognized the need for foreign language comprehension going back to the establishment of West Point in 1802, requiring its cadets to understand French, which was considered the language of diplomacy, as well as the source of the majority of the military engineering texts at the time. Spanish was added to the curriculum following the Mexican-American War and German after World War I. George Strong and Joseph Stilwell, both West Point graduates of the class of 1904, served as military attaches to Japan and China respectively. They took the opportunity to study the local language there, and understood the need to provide language training for enlisted troops. They were among the first US commanders to establish language programs offering classes for both officers and interested enlisted soldiers, teaching rudimentary spoken Chinese and Japanese.

As relations worsened with Japan in the buildup to the war, a group of officers with previous tours of duty in Japan including Rufus S. Bratton and Sidney Mashbir recognized the need for an intelligence unit able to comprehend not only the spoken Japanese language but the intricacies of military terminology. US Army G-2 intelligence staff first surveyed colleges for Japanese language students and came to the realization that in all of America, only 60 military aged Caucasian males had any interest in Japan, mostly for purely academic reasons. The possibility of using Japanese Americans, or Nisei, with language skills was suggested as the number of Caucasian personnel qualified in Japanese was almost non-existent, and there was little time to train additional Caucasian personnel. The Army directed the Fourth Army, responsible for the defense of the West Coast, to start a school, assigning Lt. Col. John Weckerling and Capt. Kai E. Rasmussen, graduates of the Japanese language program in Tokyo, to stand up the school. Nisei soldiers John F. Aiso and Arthur Kaneko were found to be qualified linguists and recruited along with two civilian instructors, Akira Oshida and Shigeya Kihara, and became the Military Intelligence Service Language School (MISLS)'s first instructors.

=== The Military Intelligence Service Language School ===
The inaugural MISLS class at the Presidio of San Francisco in 1942

The MISLS (initially known as the Fourth Army Intelligence School) began operation with an initial budget of $2,000 and scrounged together textbooks and supplies in November 1941, about a month before the Japanese bombed Pearl Harbor. The first class of 60 students begin their training at the Presidio in San Francisco, graduating 45 students in May 1942.

Prior to the attack on Pearl Harbor, some 5,000 Nisei were serving in the US military in various capacities, often assigned to menial tasks and labor units despite their qualifications. John Aiso had been drafted in 1940 and assigned to a motor pool even though at the time, he was already a well respected Harvard Law School educated attorney working with a white-shoe firm in international law.

Following Pearl Harbor, most of the Nisei were summarily discharged or placed under constant surveillance. For the officers in charge of the school and their Nisei students, the outbreak of war prompted their studies to intensify to prove their loyalty. Military Security officers questioned the loyalty of the Nisei students, removing some due to suspicion, and prompting Weckerling and Rasmussen to recognize that frontline commanders would have difficulty entrusting the Nisei soldiers with sensitive documents, and sought to find Caucasian officers with Japanese proficiency to serve as team leaders. Eighteen National Guard and Reserve officers drifted through the class, most failing due to limited comprehension ability and the complexity of the Japanese written language. Two men, however, graduated with the first group, Captain David Swift and Captain John Burden, both born in Japan as the sons of missionaries, and even spoke the Tokyo dialect better than some of the Nisei students.

Anti-Japanese sentiment pushed President Roosevelt to issue Executive Order 9066, forcing the removal of anyone with as little as 1/16th Japanese ancestry from West Coast of the United States. By March 1942, the Military Intelligence Division (MID) was being reorganized as the Military Intelligence Service (MIS). It was tasked with collecting, analyzing, and disseminating intelligence, and absorbed the Fourth Army Intelligence School. Originally comprising just 26 people, 16 of them officers, the MID was quickly expanded to include 342 officers and 1,000 enlisted men and civilians. Minnesota's Governor Harold Stassen offered up Camp Savage, a former Works Progress Administration facility (WPA) to host the MIS Language School. The school moved to Minnesota in June 1942, offering larger facilities without the complications of training Japanese-American students in the coastal areas they were prohibited from, and faced less anti-Japanese prejudice. In 1944 the school outgrew Camp Savage and was moved to Fort Snelling. There it continued to grow, occupying 120 classrooms staffed by 60 odd instructors. Over 6,000 would graduate from the WWII language program.

In Hawaii, the pre-war Corps of Intelligence Police (CIP) detachment grew from a 4 man staff to 12 officers and 18 special agents as the (CIP) was reorganized as the Army Counter Intelligence Corps (CIC) within the reorganized MIS.

In March 1941, CIC agent Major Jack Gilbert recruited two former students from his previous position as military advisor at McKinley High School in Honolulu, Richard Sakakida and Arthur Komori, as Japanese sailors who jumped ship in the Philippines to avoid the draft. Living amongst the Japanese community in Manila, they spied on Japanese interests and reported to the local CIP detachment of any hostile intentions discovered.

Sakakida would eventually be captured and tortured by the Japanese following the fall of Corregidor, and help lead an escape of 500 Philippine guerrillas held at Mantinlupa Prison.

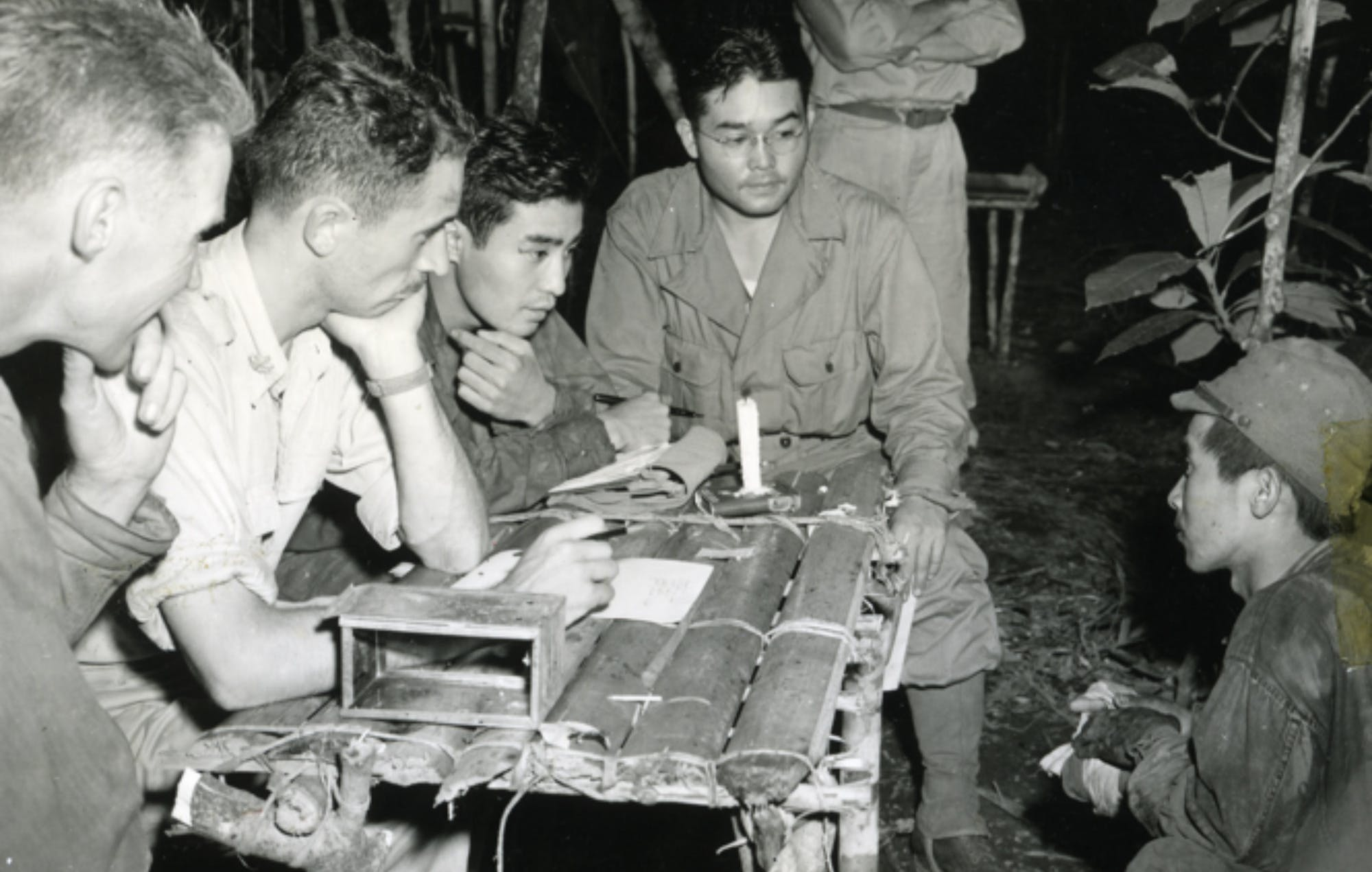
MIS interrogators Phil Ishio and Arthur Ushiro question a prisoner taken in the Buna campaign

As the first MISLS class completed its training in May 1942, its students were immediately sent to the frontlines, participating in Guadalcanal to interrogate the first captured Japanese pilot. At first, commanders were skeptical of the Nisei linguists. The first unit of MIS deployed under the command of Capt John Burden with the 37th Infantry Division to the Solomon Islands campaign. Upon arrival, Burden and his Nisei predictably found themselves assigned to menial tasks translating non-sensitive personal letters far from the front due to the lack of trust. After a chance meeting with Admiral Halsey, Halsey confessed to Burden that his own Caucasian interpreters only had a rudimentary understanding of Japanese and could only decipher the names of the prisoners. Burden convinced Halsey to give him a chance. Burden demonstrated the wealth of information that could be provided by a fully fluent linguist and vouched for the Nisei soldiers in his command to meet the demand. His presence proved to be instrumental in opening the eyes of the American field commanders to the value of the Nisei linguists.

MIS servicemen would then be present at every major battle against Japanese forces following Midway, and those who served in combat faced extremely dangerous and difficult conditions, facing prejudice from soldiers who believed they couldn't be trusted, sometimes coming under friendly fire from U.S. soldiers unable to distinguish them from the Japanese, and even dealing with the psychological conflict of encountering former friends and family on the battlefield.

"The most important action resulting from a Japanese translation was at Bougainville in 1942. An M.I.S. translator translated an un-coded Japanese radio transmission that Admiral Yamamoto was scheduled to go on an inspection tour of the bases around the Solomon Islands. U.S. Navy P-38s had fifteen minutes of fuel time available to intercept Yamamoto's aircraft near Bougainville. His plane was successfully intercepted and shot down. This was a blow to the morale of the Japanese, and was a morale booster for the Allies in the Pacific. Admiral Yamamoto had directed the Japanese attack on Pearl Harbor on 7 December 1941 after which the United States entered World War II in both the Pacific and Atlantic Theaters of Operation."

The ambush of Isoroku Yamamoto in the Solomons campaign in 1943 was a major MIS contribution to the war effort. MIS soldier Harold Fudenna intercepted a radio message indicating the whereabouts of Admiral Yamamoto, which led to P-38 Lightning fighter planes shooting down his plane over the Solomon Islands. Although this message was first met with disbelief that the Japanese would be so careless, other MIS linguists in Alaska and Hawaii had also intercepted the same message, confirming its accuracy. The success of these first few Nisei linguists convinced the War Department to establish more Japanese-American combat units such as the famed 442nd Regimental Combat Team deployed to the European Theater.

=== Merrill's Marauders ===
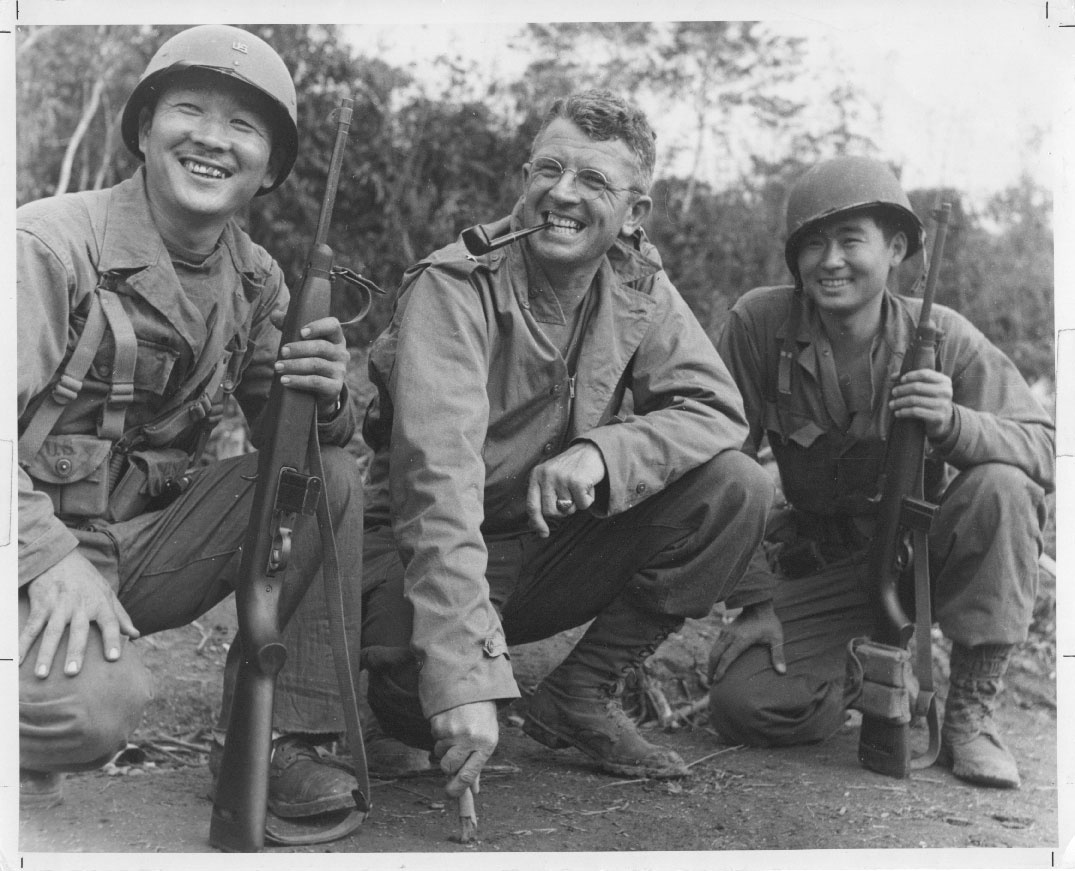
Brig Gen Frank Merrill, commander of "Merrill's Marauders," poses with Herbert Miyasaki and Akiji Yoshimura.

When Merrill's Marauders were organized to conduct long range penetration special operations jungle warfare deep behind Japanese lines in the China-Burma-India Theater in January 1944, fourteen MIS linguists were assigned to the unit, including future Army Rangers and Military Intelligence Hall of Fame inductee Roy Matsumoto.

The Nisei under Merrill's command proved themselves particularly intrepid and helpful, venturing into the enemy lines and translating audible commands to counter attacks, and shouting conflicting commands to the Japanese, throwing them into confusion. They soon became the best known Nisei in the war against Japan. The War Relocation Authority used their story to impress other Americans with Nisei valor and loyalty, even placing stories in local newspapers as the war waned in 1945, and the WRA prepared to release Japanese-American citizens back into their communities.

=== Continued success ===
Nisei MIS linguists translated Japanese documents known as the "Z Plan" in March–June 1944, which contained Japan's counterattack strategy in the Central Pacific. This information led to Allied victories at the Battle of the Philippine Sea, in which the Japanese lost most of their aircraft carrier planes, and the Battle of Leyte Gulf.

"The most important document ever translated by the M.I.S. was the Z-Plan of the Japanese Combined Fleet date 5 March 1944, signed by Admiral Koga, Commander-in-Chief of the Combined Fleet at Palau. Translated and distributed on 23 May 1944, the Z-Plan was the Japanese Imperial Navy's strategy to actively defend against any attacks on the Marianas and the Philippine Islands by the U.S. Navy. The translation of this strategic document made it possible for the Navy to gain victory in the Marianas and the Philippines, and subsequently in other areas of the Pacific."

In August 1944, the language school outgrew Camp Savage and moved to Fort Snelling, Minnesota. Many of the MIS Language School graduates during this time were attached to the joint Australian/American Allied Translator and Interpreter Section (ATIS) as linguists and in other non-combatant roles, interpreting captured enemy documents and interrogating prisoners of war. MIS linguists were also assigned to the Office of War Information to help create propaganda and other psychological warfare campaigns, with the Signal Intelligence Service to decipher Japanese Army codes, and even involved with the Manhattan Project, translating technical documents and scientific papers on nuclear physics. (At the end of the war, MIS linguists had translated 20.5 million pages, 18,000 enemy documents, created 16,000 propaganda leaflets and interrogated over 10,000 Japanese POWs.)

In December 1944, Oregon native Frank Hachiya was tasked with interrogating a prisoner captured during the Battle of Leyte. On his way back to his HQ to report the intel gained, he was shot in the abdomen and crawled, bleeding and in agony, through the grass and scrub back to his lines to make his report. Despite the best efforts of the field surgeons, he eventually succumbed to his wounds, but not before passing on the intelligence acquired. The account of his death was widely reported in national news, contrasting sharply with news that the local American Legion post in his hometown of Hood River, Oregon had removed the names of 16 WWI Japanese-Americans veterans from its 'roll of honor' only a month before. Scathing editorials in The Oregonian and The New York Times eventually caused the post to reverse its course, restoring all the names of Nisei servicemen from Hood River to the wall, and adding the name of Frank Hachiya.

Because of the highly classified and secret nature of these missions, knowledge of the work of many MIS soldiers was largely missing during the war and even decades afterwards. The role and activities of the MIS was kept in secrecy for more than 30 years; the few records about its activities were finally made available to the public in 1972 under the Freedom of Information Act, however much still remains unknown today. Consequently, many MIS soldiers did not receive recognition or decorations for their efforts. They became "unsung heroes", unacknowledged for their contributions in wartime as well as postwar activities. ATIS commander Col Sidney Mashbir would write in his memoir, "I Was an American Spy", "The United States of America owes a debt to these men and to their families which it can never fully repay."

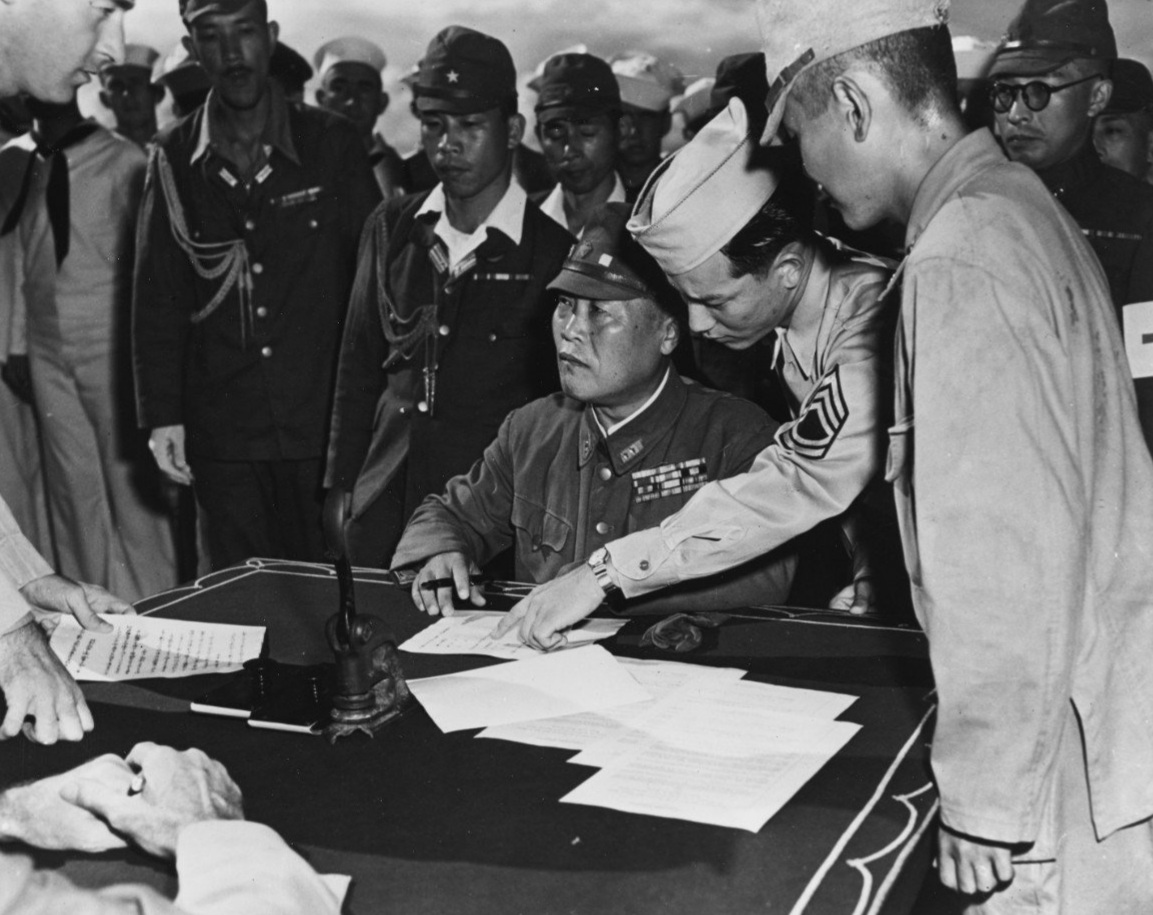
An MIS interpreter assists Japanese Lt Gen Tachibana as he prepares to surrender at the Bonin Islands

The first MISLS students came from the army, but later students were also recruited from Japanese internment camps, eventually graduating more than 6,000 students by the end of the occupation. This was aided by the fact that MISLS introduced a condensed 4 month course in July 1945 focusing on just oral language skills to meet the demand for interpreters, instead of the immersive 9 month course focusing on the technical written language of the military for signals intelligence and psyops with strict entrance requirements for acceptance into the school.

Nisei from the MIS parachuted down into Japanese POW prison camps at Hankow, Mukden, Peiping and Hainan as interpreters on mercy missions to liberate American and other Allied prisoners. Arthur T. Morimitsu was the only MIS member in the detachment commanded by Major Richard Irby and 1st Lt. Jeffrey Smith to observe the surrender ceremony of 60,000 Japanese troops under Gen. Shimada. Kan Tagami witnessed Japanese forces surrender to the British in Malaya.

Some Nisei were sent to the Europe near the end of the war. Assigned to translate captured documents from Japanese embassies all across the continent. One mission involved a team of Nisei parachuting into Berlin to obtain documents held by the Japanese embassy. However, the mission was scrapped after the Russians captured the city. Afterwards, the team then split up. With soldiers deployed all across Europe to obtain Japanese documents. Including Belgium, Germany, Italy, and Yugoslavia.

=== U.S. occupation of Japan ===
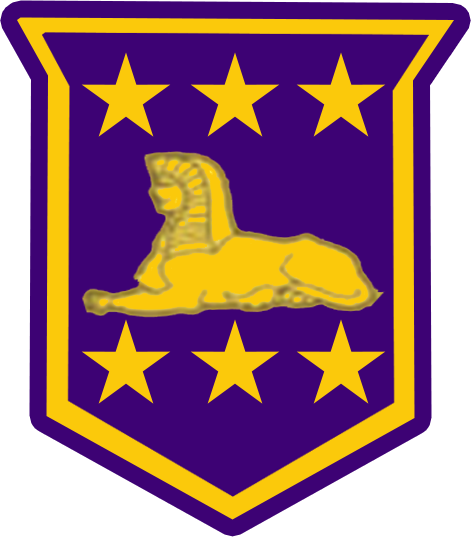
Military Intelligence Service Japan Pocket Patch

Over 5,000 Japanese Americans served in the occupation of Japan. MIS graduates served as translators, interpreters, and investigators in the International Military Tribunal for the Far East. Thomas Sakamoto served as press escort during the occupation of Japan. He escorted American correspondents to Hiroshima, and the USS Missouri in Tokyo Bay. Sakamoto was one of three Japanese Americans to be on board the USS Missouri when the Japanese formally surrendered. Arthur S. Komori served as personal interpreter for Brig. Gen. Elliot R. Thorpe. Kay Kitagawa served as personal interpreter of Fleet Admiral William Halsey Jr. Kan Tagami served as personal interpreter-aide for General Douglas MacArthur. Journalist Don Caswell was accompanied by a Nisei interpreter to Fuchū Prison, where the Japanese government imprisoned communists Tokuda Kyuichi, Yoshio Shiga, and Shiro Mitamura.

MIS interpreter Ben Oshita questions a witness for the war crimes trials

During the occupation, Nisei members of the MIS addressed issues related to public welfare and the rebuilding of Japanese cities. George Koshi contributed in the creation of the Constitution of Japan, while Raymond Aka and Harry Fukuhara assisted in creating the Japanese National Police Reserve and the subsequent Defense Agency. Koshi, Aka, and Fukuhara would all be awarded the Order of the Rising Sun by the Japanese government for their efforts. The MIS also assisted in the demobilization of Japanese military personnel returning from various overseas posts, and contributed to the arrest and prosecution of Japan's military leaders during war trials that began in December 1945 and lasted until 1948.

The Nisei servicemen weren't entirely without controversy, as soldiers with the Civil Censorship Detachment were also responsible for implementing censorship during the Allied occupation of Japan. The Allied occupation forces suppressed news of criminal activities such as rape; on 10 September 1945, the Supreme Commander for the Allied Powers "issued press and pre-censorship codes outlawing the publication of all reports and statistics 'inimical to the objectives of the Occupation'."

At its peak in early 1946, the MISLS had 160 instructors and 3,000 students studying in more than 125 classrooms. The twenty-first and final commencement at Fort Snelling in June 1946 featured the graduation of 307 students, bringing the total number of MISLS graduates to more than 6,000. What began as an experimental military intelligence language-training program launched on a budget of $2,000 eventually became the forerunner of today's Defense Language Institute for the tens of thousands of linguists who serve American interests throughout the world.

In 1946 the school moved to the Presidio of Monterey. Renamed the Army Language School, it expanded rapidly in 1947–48 during the Cold War. Instructors, including native speakers of more than thirty languages and dialects, were recruited from all over the world. Russian became the largest language program, followed by Chinese, Korean, and German.

== Recognition and legacy ==
In April 2000, more than 50 years after World War II, the Military Intelligence Service became the recipient of the Presidential Unit Citation, the highest honor given to a U.S. military unit.

Individual MIS members have been honored with the Distinguished Service Cross, Distinguished Service Medal, Silver Star, Legion of Merit, Navy Cross, Bronze Star, Purple Heart, Order of the Rising Sun, Order of National Glory, Philippine Legion of Honor, and the British Empire Medal.

On 5 October 2010, Congress approved the granting of the Congressional Gold Medal to the 6,000 Japanese Americans who served in the Military Intelligence Service during the war, as well as the Japanese American 442nd Regimental Combat Team and 100th Infantry Battalion. The Nisei Soldiers of World War II Congressional Gold Medal was collectively presented on November 2, 2011.

Nine members of the MIS have been inducted into the Military Intelligence Hall of Fame, and 3 members assigned to Merrill's Marauders, Roy Matsumoto (1993), Henry Gosho (1997), and Grant Hirabayashi (2004), have been inducted into the Army Rangers Hall of Fame.

The Defense Language Institute at Presidio of Monterey dedicated Nisei Hall in honor of the Japanese Americans who served in the MIS, along with the individually named John Aiso Library and Munakata Hall (named for the former MISLS instructor Yutaka Munakata), and the Hachiya, Mizutari, and Nakamura Halls (named for Frank Hachiya, Yukitaka "Terry" Mizutari, and George Nakamura, who were killed in action in Leyte, New Guinea, and Luzon respectively). Additionally, longtime civilian MISLS instructor Shigeya Kihara was inducted into the Defense Language Institute Hall of Fame in its inaugural year, 2006, and MISLS graduates Col Thomas Sakamoto and Maj Masaji Gene Uratsu inducted the following year in 2007.

Building 640, the building within the Presidio of San Francisco that was the original site of the Military Intelligence Service (MIS) Language School, is preserved as the Military Intelligence Service Historic Learning Center by the National Japanese American Historical Society.

The Japanese American Memorial to Patriotism During World War II in Washington, D.C. is a National Park Service site honoring Japanese American veterans who served in the Military Intelligence Service, 100th Infantry Battalion, 442nd RCT, and other units, as well as the patriotism and endurance of those held in Japanese American internment camps and detention centers.

The Go for Broke Monument in Little Tokyo, Los Angeles, California, commemorates the Japanese Americans who served in the United States Army during World War II. General Douglas MacArthur is quoted on the monument in reference to the MIS saying, "Never in military history did an army know as much about the enemy prior to actual engagement".

State Route 23 between U.S. Route 101 and State Route 118 was named the "Military Intelligence Service Memorial Highway" in 1994.

For Veterans' Day in 2022, Hood River American Legion Post 22 publicly apologized to the Japanese American community, passing Resolution 001-2022 to officially repeal the controversial 1944 resolution removing the names of WWI Japanese American veterans from the post's honor roll. Hood River has previously made attempts to make amends to Nisei veterans, including replacing the names after great outcry in the immediate aftermath of the war.

== In popular culture ==
New York Times bestselling author Bruce Henderson wrote the award-winning nonfiction book Bridge to the Sun in 2022, about the experiences of the Japanese Americans who, as members of the Military Intelligence Service, fought in all the major campaigns in the Pacific in World War II. Henderson also wrote the 2017 NYT bestseller, Sons and Soldiers, about the MIS Ritchie Boys, which is currently being developed for a feature film.

The story of the MIS Japanese-American translators was published in the 1988 book John Aiso and the MIS: Japanese-American Soldiers in the Military Intelligence Service by Tad Ichinokuchi, and the 2007 book Nisei Linguists: Japanese Americans in the Military Intelligence Service During World War II by James C. McNaughton.

A young Sgt Norman Mailer would meet 2nd Lt Yoshikazu Yamada, assigned to the 112th Cavalry RCT during the Luzon Campaign in the Philippines. Mailer would base the character of "Tom Wakara" on Yamada in his novel, The Naked and the Dead, based on his experiences in the war.

In 2001, filmmaker Gayle Yamada produced the documentary Uncommon Courage: Patriotism and Civil Liberties, telling the stories of Nisei intelligence specialists during the war for PBS.

Author Pamela Rotner Sakamoto published the book Midnight in Broad Daylight in 2016, about the experiences of Harry K. Fukuhara and his family during World War II.

The experience of the Nisei MIS linguists' experience was fictionalized for the Japanese market in the novel Futatsu no Sokoku (Two Homelands) by Toyoko Yamasaki in 1983. It was dramatized into a limited series of the same name by TV Tokyo in 2019.

In the second season of 2019 AMC Series, The Terror: Infamy, the characters Chester Nakayama and Arthur Ogawa join the fictional "Japanese Linguist Program", based on the MIS.

== Notable MIS veterans ==
Those indicated with an (*) have been inducted into the Military Intelligence Hall of Fame.

- John F. Aiso*
- Raymond Aka
- Harry Akune*
- George Aratani
- George Ariyoshi
- Koji Ariyoshi
- Robert Fukuda
- Harry K. Fukuhara*
- Dick Hamada*
- Gero Iwai*
- Kay Kitagawa
- Arthur Komori*
- George Koshi
- Hoichi "Bob" Kubo
- Sidney Mashbir*
- Hisashi Masuda*
- Masaji Marumoto
- Roy Matsumoto*
- Wataru Misaka
- Arthur T. Morimitsu
- Yutaka Munakata
- Shig Murao
- Bill Naito
- Richard Sakakida*
- Thomas Sakamoto
- Bell M. Shimada
- Tak Shindo
- Kan Tagami*
- Teruto Tsubota
- Ted Tsukiyama
- George Tsutakawa
- Karl Yoneda
- George Yuzawa

== Fallen members ==
The following MIS personnel were killed over the course of the war:

Paper from Defense Language Institute honoring MIS members George Nakamura, Frank Hachiya, and Terry Mizutari

- T/Sgt Eddie Yukio Fukui (Born Tacoma, WA – KIA Okinawa)
- T/Sgt Frank Tadakazu Hachiya (Born Hood River, OR – KIA Leyte Gulf)
- Pfc George Ikeda (Born Waianae, HI – DNB Tokyo, Japan)
- T/4 Haruyuki Ikemoto (Born Hamakuapoko, HI – DNB Okinawa)
- T/4 William Shunichi Imoto (Harding, WA - KIA Okinawa)
- T/4 Kazuyoshi Inouye (Born Lihue, HI – DNB Okinawa)
- Pvt Masayuki Ishii (Born Hilo, HI – DNB Okinawa)
- 2LT David Akira Itami (Born Los Angeles, CA - DNB Tokyo, Japan)
- Pvt Joseph Kinyone (Born Wailua, HI – KIA Saipan)
- T/4 Ben Satoshi Kurokawa (Born Guadalupe, CA - KIA Okinawa)
- S/Sgt Joseph Kuwada (Born Honolulu, HI – DNB Okinawa)
- T/Sgt Yukitaka "Terry" Mizutari (Born Hilo, HI – KIA New Guinea)
- Pfc Masaru Muramoto (Born Honolulu, HI – DNB Kobe, Japan)
- S/Sgt Shoichi Nakahara (Born Olaa, HI – DNB Okinawa)
- Sgt George Ichiro Nakamura (Born Watsonville, CA – KIA Luzon)
- Sgt Kenji Omura (Born Seattle, WA – KIA Admiralties)
- T/4 Wilfred Motokane (Born Honolulu, HI – DNB Okinawa)
- T/4 George Mitsuo Shibata (Born Chicago, IL – KIA Okinawa)

== See also ==
- Japanese-American service in World War II
- G-2 (intelligence)
- Military Information Division
- Military Intelligence Division
- Signal Intelligence Service
- United States Office of War Information
- Psychological warfare
- Defense Language Institute
- United States Army Military Intelligence Corps
- United States Army Intelligence and Security Command
- 300th Military Intelligence Brigade (United States)
- P. O. Box 1142
