= Defense Language Institute =

Educational agency of the U.S. Department of Defense

Coordinates: 36.6057°N 121.9104°W

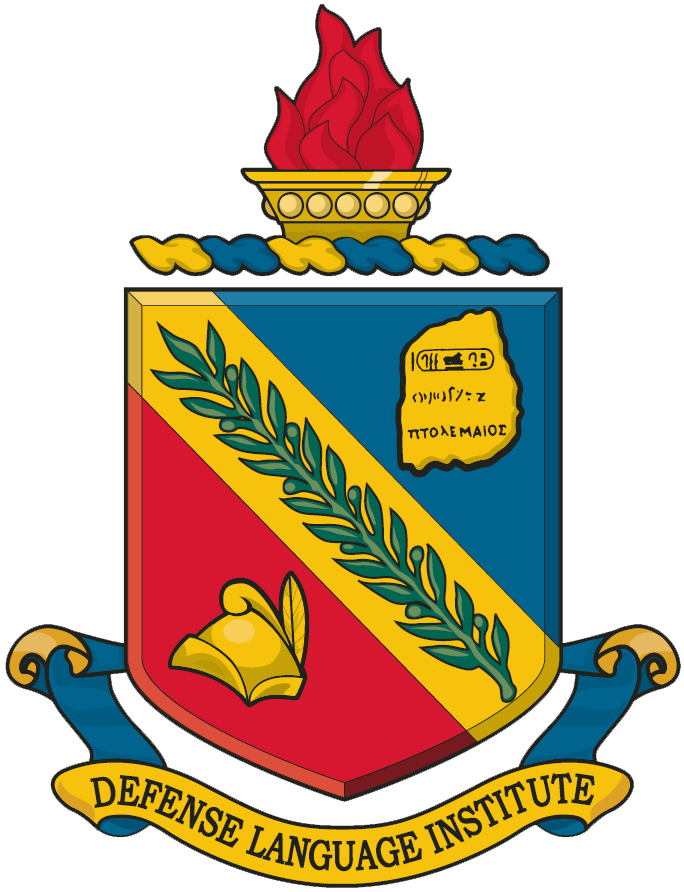
- Established: 1954 (DLIELC); 1963 (DLIFLC)
- Commandant: Lieutenant Colonel Marvin Mark (DLIELC); Colonel Christy Whitfield (DLIFLC)
- Location: DLIELC: Joint Base San Antonio, Texas; DLIFLC: Presidio of Monterey, California, U.S.
- Campus: DLIELC, DLIFLC
- Website: English Language Center, Foreign Language Center

The Defense Language Institute (DLI) is a United States Department of Defense (DoD) educational and research institution consisting of two separate entities which provide linguistic and cultural instruction to the Department of Defense, other federal agencies and numerous customers around the world. The Defense Language Institute is responsible for the Defense Language Program, and the bulk of the Defense Language Institute's activities involve educating DoD members in assigned languages, and international personnel in English. Other functions include planning, curriculum development, and research in second-language acquisition.

== Overview ==
The two primary entities of the Defense Language Institute are the Defense Language Institute Foreign Language Center (DLIFLC) and the Defense Language Institute English Language Center (DLIELC). DLIFLC is located at the Presidio of Monterey in Monterey, California, and DLIELC is located at Joint Base San Antonio - Lackland Air Force Base, Texas.

=== Defense Language Institute Foreign Language Center ===
The DLIFLC is a part of the U.S. Army Transformation and Training Command and the institute offers foreign language instruction in more 10 languages to approximately 3,500 students on a schedule that extends throughout the year. Courses are taught seven hours per day, five days a week, with the exception of federal holidays and training holidays. The duration of courses range between 36 and 64 weeks, depending on the difficulty of the language.

Both active and reserve forces soldiers as well as members of the other services, foreign military students, civilian employees and law enforcement agencies send students to the school.

The 95 percent of the instructors are native speakers in the language they teach. DLIFLC has Language Training Detachments at locations around the world.

The military also uses a custom language program known as CL-150 that is available to all government and military personnel.

=== Defense Language Institute English Language Center ===
The Defense Language Institute English Language Center manages the Department of Defense English Language Program (DELP), and managed by Detachment 1, 637th Training Group. The over 300 civilian members of the staff include the instructors who are qualified in the area of English as a second language.

DLIELC is accredited by the Commission on English Language Program Accreditation, which is recognized by the US Department of Education.

DLIELC trains 5,500 resident students from 159 nations each year. Detachment 1, 637th Training Group falls under the Air Education and Training Command (AETC).

DLIELC is divided into three resident academic training sections: General English, Specialized English, and Instructor Development. Depending on the needs of the students, training can range from nine weeks (in Specialized English, for example) to 52 weeks in General English. Some students arrive with only minimal English capabilities, then train to a predetermined English comprehension level (ECL) in General English. Annually, students from over 100 countries enroll in the DLIELC resident training programs. Training is paid by the host country (Foreign Military Sales) or through US grant assistance programs such as International Military Education and Training Programs. In addition to DLIELC's mission to train international students, DLIELC is responsible for providing English language training to US military service members whose primary language is not English. The DLIELC campus is located on the southwest quadrant of Lackland AFB.

== History ==
The Defense Language Institute Foreign Language Center (DLIFLC) traces its roots to the eve of United States entry into World War II, when the U.S. Army established a secret school, the 4th Army Intelligence School, at the Presidio of San Francisco with a budget of $2,000 to teach the Japanese language. Classes began 1 November 1941, with four instructors and 60 students (mainly Nisei - second-generation Japanese Americans) in an abandoned airplane hangar at Crissy Field known as Building 640. The site is now preserved as the Military Intelligence Service (MIS) Historic Learning Center by the National Japanese American Historical Society.

Gen. Joseph Stilwell and Gen. George Marshall studied Chinese as officers stationed in China and understood the need to provide language training for enlisted troops, establishing a language program in 1924 to teach U.S. soldiers and officers in Asia the rudiments of spoken Chinese. Recognizing the strained relations between Japan and the U.S. in the build up to the war, a small group of officers with previous tours of duty in Japan saw the need for an intelligence unit, which would be able to understand the Japanese language. This group of officers was headed by Lt. Col. John Weckerling and Capt Kai E. Rasmussen. Japanese American Maj John F. Aiso and Pfc Arthur Kaneko, were found to be qualified linguists along with two civilian instructors, Akira Oshida and Shigeya Kihara, and became MISLS's first instructors.

The students were primarily second generation Japanese Americans (Nisei) from the West Coast, who had learned Japanese from their first-generation parents but were educated in the US and whose Japanese was somewhat limited, the "Kibei", Japanese-Americans who had been educated in Japan and spoke Japanese like the Japanese themselves, along with two Caucasian students who were born in Japan as the sons of missionaries. Even for the native Japanese speakers, the course curriculum featured heigo (兵語) or military specific terminology that was as foreign to the Japanese speakers as US military slang is to the average American civilian.

During the war, the Military Intelligence Service Language School (MISLS), as it came to be called, grew dramatically. After the attack on Pearl Harbor Japanese-Americans on the West Coast and the Hawaii Territory were moved into internment camps in 1942. Because of anti-Japanese sentiments the Army did a nationwide survey for the least hostile environment and moved the school to a former Minnesota WPA camp named Camp Savage. By 1944 the school had outgrown those facilities and moved to Fort Snelling close by. There the school grew to 125 classrooms with over 160 instructors. Over 6,000 of its graduates served in the Pacific during the war and occupation of Japan.

Nisei Hall, along with several other buildings, is named to recognize those WWII students honored in the institute's Yankee Samurai exhibit. The John Aiso Library is named for the former MISLS director of academic training, Munakata Hall is named for the former MISLS instructor Yutaka Munakata, and the Hachiya, Mizutari, and Nakamura Halls are named for Frank Tadakazu Hachiya, Yukitaka "Terry" Mizutari, and George Ichiro Nakamura, who were killed in action in Leyte, New Guinea, and Luzon.

In addition to the Japanese Language-training center, a Chinese American Language division was created to help with the China Burma India (CBI) war effort. The unit was trained in Mandarin and was activated on December 6, 1944, and led by their Division Director, Captain Ernest K. H. Eng in February 1945.

U.S. Army film about the Army Language School, Monterey, CA, 1951

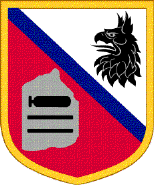
U.S. ARMY ELEMENT DEFENSE LANGUAGE INSTITUTE FOREIGN LANGUAGE CENTER

In 1946 Fort Snelling was deactivated and the school moved back to the Presidio of Monterey. There it was renamed as the Army Language School. The Cold War accelerated the school's growth in 1947–48. Instructors were recruited worldwide, included native speakers of 38 languages. Russian became the largest program, followed by Chinese, Korean, and German.

The Defense Language Institute English Language Center (DLIELC) traces its formal beginning to May 1954, when the 3746th Pre-Flight Training Squadron (language) was activated and assumed responsibility for all English language training. The school's primary mission was teaching English to allied pilot candidates. In 1960, the Language School, USAF, activated and assumed the mission. In 1966, the DoD established the Defense Language Institute English Language School (DLIELS) and placed it under US Army control although the school remained at Lackland AFB. In 1976, the DoD appointed the US Air Force as the executive agent for the school and redesignated it the Defense Language Institute English Language Center.

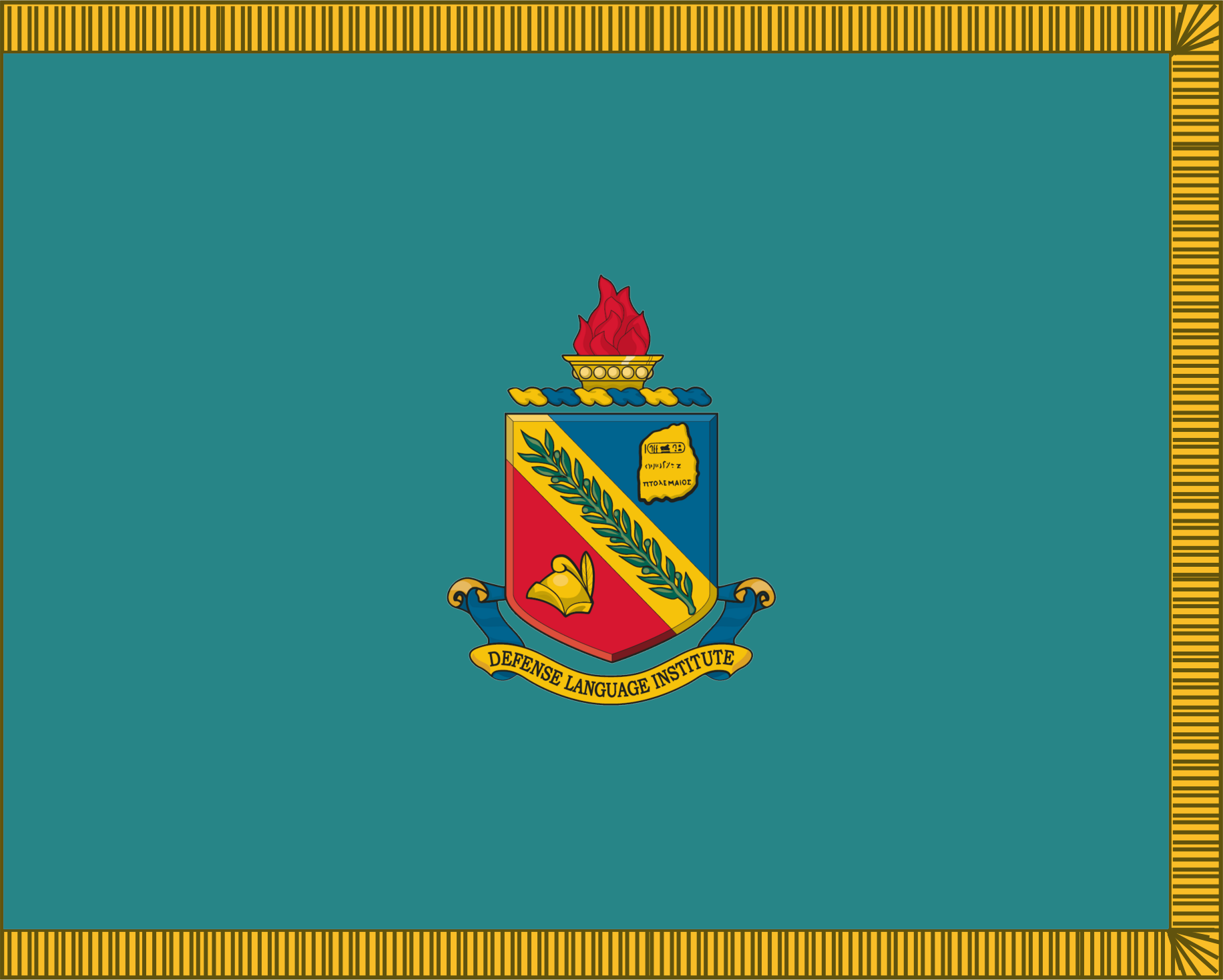
US Army Defense Language Institute Flag

=== Cold War language instruction ===
The U.S. Air Force met most of its foreign language training requirements in the 1950s through contract programs at universities such as Yale, Cornell, and Syracuse and the U.S. Navy taught foreign languages at the Naval Intelligence School in Washington, D.C., but in 1963 these programs were consolidated into the Defense Foreign Language Program. A new headquarters, the Defense Language Institute (DLI), was established in Washington, D.C., and the former Army Language School commandant, Colonel James L. Collins Jr., became the institute's first director. The Army Language School became the DLI West Coast Branch, and the foreign language department at the Naval Intelligence School became the DLI East Coast Branch. The contract programs were gradually phased out. DLI also took over the English Language School at Lackland Air Force Base, Texas, which became the DLI English Language Center (DLIELC).

During the peak of American involvement in Vietnam (1965–73), DLI stepped up the pace of language training. While regular language training continued unabated, more than 20,000 service personnel studied Vietnamese through the DLI's programs, many taking a special eight-week military adviser "survival" course. From 1966 to 1973, the institute also operated a Vietnamese branch using contract instructors at Biggs Air Force Base near Fort Bliss, Texas (DLI Support Command, later renamed the DLI Southwest Branch). Vietnamese instruction continued at DLI until 2004.

=== Consolidation ===
In the 1975, the institute's headquarters and all resident language training were consolidated at the West Coast Branch and renamed the Defense Language Institute Foreign Language Center (DLIFLC). In 1973, the newly formed U.S. Army Training and Doctrine Command (TRADOC) assumed administrative control, and in 1976, all English language training operations were returned to the U.S. Air Force, which operates DLIELC to this day.

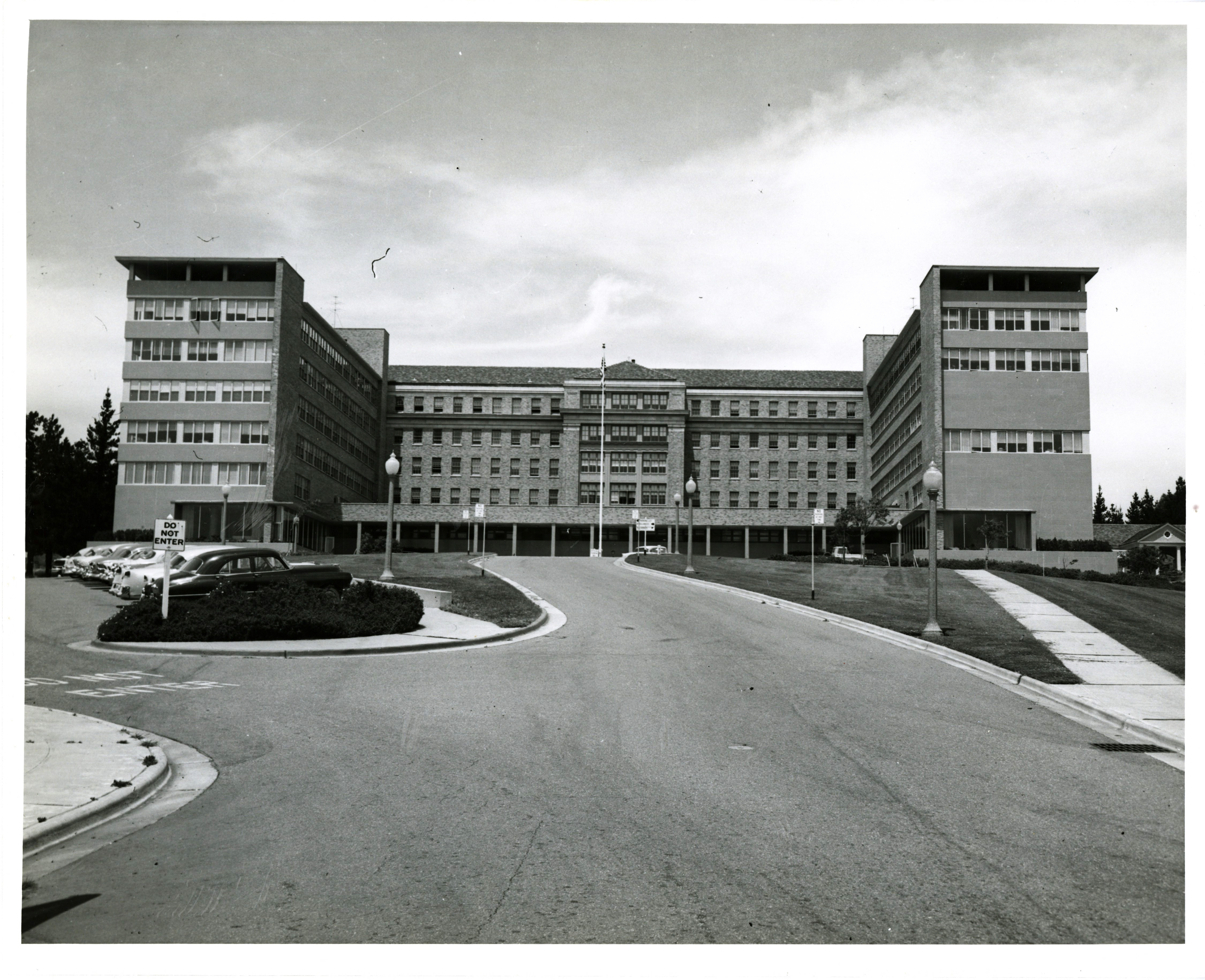
Former Public Health Service Hospital on The Presidio of San Francisco and former DLI branch location. The building center were classrooms and offices, while both wings were student quarters.

The DLIFLC earned academic accreditation in 1979 from the Western Association of Schools and Colleges, and in 1981 the position of academic dean (later called provost) was reestablished. In the early 1980s, crowding and living conditions at the Monterey location forced the institute to open two temporary branches: a branch for air force enlisted students of Russian at Lackland Air Force Base, Texas (1981–1987), and another for army enlisted students of Russian, German, Korean and Spanish at the Presidio of San Francisco (1982–1988) in the former Public Health Service Hospital. There were only enlisted male and female students at the Presidio of San Francisco, primarily from the Military Occupational Specialties of Military Intelligence and Military Police with a small number of Army Special Forces. As a result of these conditions, the institute began an extensive facilities expansion program on the Presidio. In 2002 the Accrediting Commission for Community and Junior Colleges accredited the institute as an associate degree-granting institution.

=== Base Realignment and annexation ===
In the spring of 1993, the Base Realignment and Closure (BRAC) Commission rejected suggestions that the institute be moved or closed, and recommended that its mission be continued at the present location. In summer of 2005, the commission reopened the issue, to include the closure of the Naval Postgraduate School. Supporters of the closure believed that due to the rising property values and cost of living in the Monterey Bay area, taxpayers would save money by moving both schools to a less expensive location in Ohio. Opponents argued that it would be difficult (if not impossible) to replace the experienced native-speaking faculty at DLI, as the cultural centers of San Francisco and California's Central Coast offer a more diverse pool from which to recruit local instructors, and that the military intelligence community would suffer as a result. The BRAC commission met in Monterey on 8 August 2005, to hear arguments from both sides. On 25 August 2005, the commission's final vote was unanimous to keep DLI at its current location in Monterey.

== Schools and locations ==
=== English Language Center (DLIELC) ===
The DLIELC is a Department of Defense agency operated by the U.S. Air Force's 37th Training Wing, and is responsible for training international military and civilian personnel to speak and teach English. The agency also manages the English as a Second Language Program for the US military, and manages overseas English training programs. International students must be sponsored by an agency of the Department of Defense, and commonly include personnel from NATO member countries. Over 100 countries are represented among the student body at DLIELC at any given time. The main campus is currently located on the grounds of Joint Base San Antonio - Lackland Air Force Base, in San Antonio, Texas. DLIELC acculturates and trains international personnel to communicate in English and to instruct English language programs in their country, trains United States military personnel in English as a second language, and deploys English Language Training programs around the world in support of the Defense Department.

=== Foreign Language Center (DLIFLC) ===
The DLIFLC at the Presidio of Monterey, California (DLIFLC & POM) is the DoD's primary foreign language school. Military service members study foreign languages at highly accelerated paces in courses ranging from 24 to 64 weeks in length. In October 2001, the Institute received Federal degree-granting authority to issue Associate of Arts in Foreign Language degrees to qualified graduates of all basic programs. As of 2022, DLIFLC also offers bachelor's degrees to graduates of DLI accredited Intermediate and Advanced courses.

Although the property is under the jurisdiction of the United States Army, there are U.S. Navy, U.S. Marine Corps, and U.S. Air Force presences on post, and all four branches provide students and instructors. Members of other Federal agencies and military services of other countries may also receive training, and members of other law enforcement agencies may receive Spanish language training.

As of 2015, a number of languages are taught at the DLIFLC including Afrikaans in Washington, DC and the following in Monterey: Modern Standard Arabic, Chinese (Mandarin), French, Indonesian, Japanese, Korean, Russian, Spanish.

=== DLI-Washington ===
The DLIFLC also maintains the DLI-Washington office in the Washington, D.C. area. The Washington office provides training in languages not taught at the Presidio of Monterey, such as "low-density languages" which do not require the same large volume of trained personnel. There is some overlap, however, as students from the Defense Attaché System (DAS) are given local training in languages also available at the Monterey location.

Language training through DLI-Washington is conducted at the National Foreign Affairs Training Center (NFATC) of the United States Department of State, and at various contracted foreign language schools in the metropolitan Washington, DC area.

== Insignia ==
The DLIFLC crest was originally adopted by the U.S. Army Language School in 1963. The aqua blue, yellow and red shield has a fragment of the Rosetta Stone in the top right hand section. The gold cap in the red section was worn by the San Carlos Catalan Volunteers who assisted Father Junipero Serra in starting the presidio fort in Monterey. In the gold section is a green olive branch representing peace through understanding.

== See also ==
- Defense Language Aptitude Battery
- Defense Language Office
- Defense Language Proficiency Tests
- Monterey Institute of International Studies
- Joint Services School for Linguists
- Language education
- List of Language Self-Study Programs
