= National Japanese American Historical Society =

San Francisco non-profit organization

- Abbreviation: NJAHS
- Formation: 1980; 46 years ago
- Type: Nonprofit Historical Society
- Headquarters: Japantown
- Website: https://njahs.org

The National Japanese American Historical Society (Japanese: 全米日系人歴史協会, Hepburn: Zenbei Nikkeijin Rekishi Kyōkai; NJAHS) is an American 501(c) 3 non-profit organization based in Japantown in San Francisco, California.

The organization is dedicated to collecting, preserving and sharing historical information and authentic interpretation about the experience of Japanese Americans. As part of its mission, it hosts rotating exhibits, archives, and education programs aimed at education beyond the Japanese-American community with a particular focus on the incarceration of Japanese Americans during World War II.

The organization was founded in 1980 and incorporated in 1981. It is headquartered at the former site of the Uoki Sakai Fish Market at 1684 Post Street in San Francisco. The organization has received funding from the National Park Service's Japanese American Confinement Sites Grant Program.

== Military Intelligence Service (MIS) Historic Learning Center ==
The National Japanese American Historical Society operates the Military Intelligence Service Historic Learning Center in Crissy Field, within the Presidio of San Francisco. The site, known as Building 640, which was the original site of the Military Intelligence Service (MIS) Language School where Japanese American soldiers secretly trained in Japanese military language to assist the American war effort during World War II.

The Learning Center was originally expected to open in 2012. However, the opening was delayed and the museum finally opened its doors in 2013.

The Military Intelligence Service (MIS) Language School, which started just weeks before the Pearl Harbor attack, was a clandestine program to train Nisei as interpreters and intelligence personnel. Despite their families being interned, these Japanese Americans played a crucial role in translating and interpreting Japanese military communications to significantly aid the U.S. war effort. The interpretive center aims to advance understanding of the Military Intelligence Service and Japanese American veterans' roles during the war which, according to Major General Charles Willoughby, "shortened the Pacific War by two years and saved possibly a million American lives". It also documents how the work of Japanese Americans at MIS formed the basis leading to the creation of the Defense Language Institute.

== Peace Gallery and exhibitions ==
The NJAHS has created a number of different traveling exhibitions relating to Japanese American history, for example internment camps during World War II and the history of Japanese American women. It also hosts exhibits that highlight various aspects of the Japanese American experience. The Peace Gallery, located at its headquarters, showcases exhibits on many issues and themes relating to the Japanese American experience. Exhibits are free to the public and typically last three to six months. As of December 2023, it is currently hosting an exhibit featuring Japanese American veterans by Los Angeles photographer Shane Sato.

== See also ==
- Japanese American National Museum
- Japanese American Citizens League
- Japanese American Memorial to Patriotism During World War II
- Japanese American Internment Museum
- Densho: The Japanese American Legacy Project
