= Harry K. Fukuhara =

US Army officer

Harry Katsuharu Fukuhara
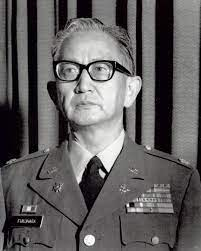
- Col Fukuhara as Military Governor of the Yaeyama Islands Group
- Born: January 1, 1920; Seattle, Washington
- Died: April 8, 2015 (aged 95); Honolulu, Hawaii
- Burial place: Golden Gate National Cemetery
- Relatives: Terry Fukuhara (wife)
- Military career
- Allegiance: United States
- Branch: United States Army
- Service years: 1942–1971
- Rank: Colonel
- Units: Military Intelligence Service; Allied Translator and Interpreter Section; 33rd Infantry Division
- Commands: Counterintelligence Field Office, Osaka; CI Liaison Detachment, Tokyo; CI Detachment, Tokyo; Military Governor of the Yaeyama Islands Group
- Conflicts: World War II: Philippines Campaign; New Guinea Campaign
- Awards: Legion of Merit; Bronze Star; National Intelligence Distinguished Service Medal; President's Distinguished Civilian Service Award; Japanese Order of the Rising Sun; Military Intelligence Hall of Fame

Colonel Harry Katsuharu Fukuhara (Japanese: 福原 克治, January 1, 1920 – April 8, 2015) was a United States Army soldier and officer who was inducted in the United States Military Intelligence Hall of Fame in 1988.

== Biography ==
=== Early life ===
Fukuhara was born in Seattle, Washington in 1920. His father died in 1933, and his mother took the family back to native Japan before World War II. In 1938, following graduation from high-school in Japan, Harry returned to the United States. During World War II, Fukuhara was incarcerated at the Gila River War Relocation Center following the signing of Executive Order 9066.

=== Military career ===
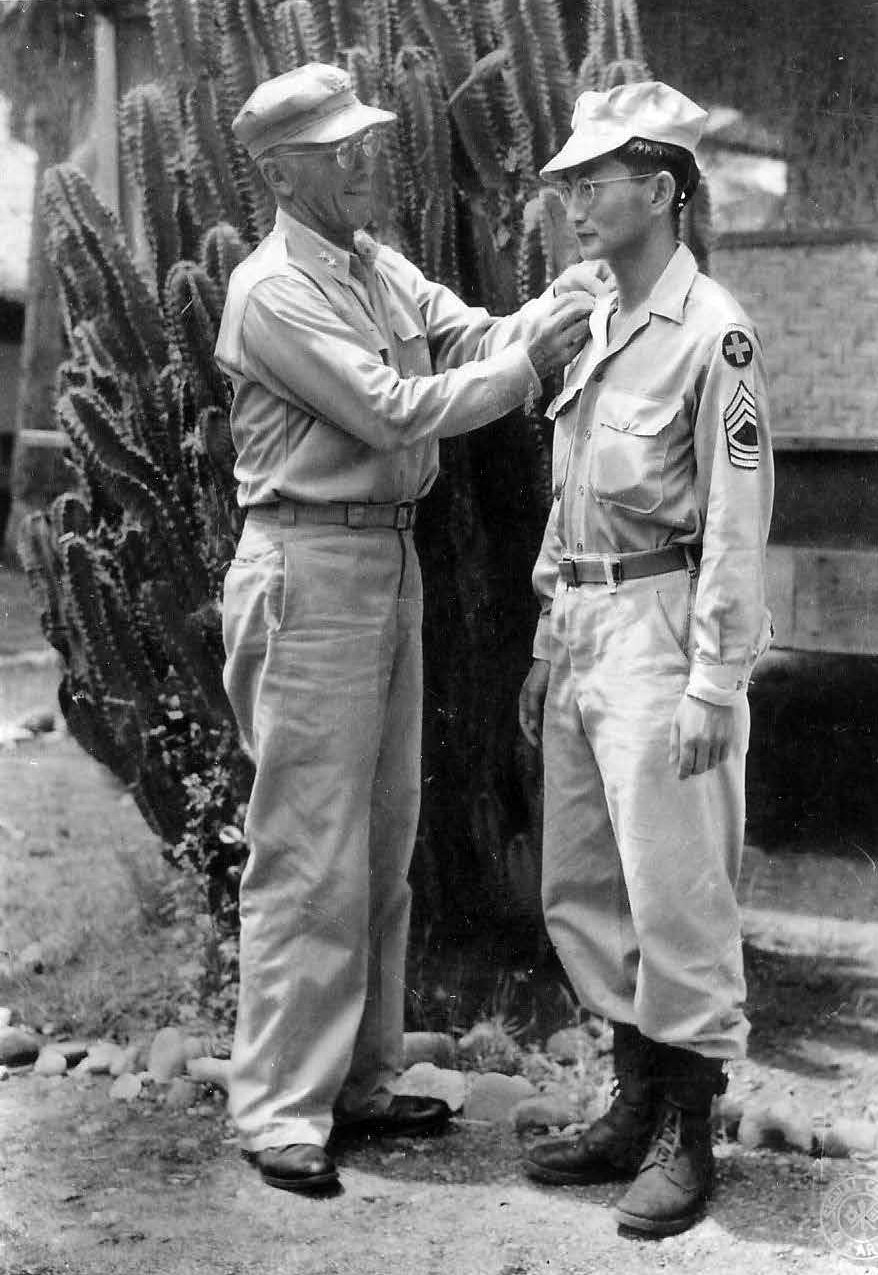
Major general Percy W. Clarkson, Commanding 33rd Infantry Division promotes Master Sgt. Fukuhara during Philippines Campaign in summer 1945.

After enlisting in the Army from the Gila River incarceration camp in 1942, Fukuhara served in the Army in the Pacific as a linguist with the 33rd Infantry Division. He served in the New Guinea and Philippine campaigns, earning a battlefield commission. Toward the end of the war he was part of the force preparing to invade Kyushu, Japan. Unknown to him, as he was preparing for the assault of Japan, he had a brother who was drafted in the Japanese Army who was preparing Kyushu's defense. Following the conclusion of the war he was sent to Japanese prisoner camps where he had to tell them of the bombing and the emperor's surrender. About a month following the surrender of Japan during the beginning of the occupation he secured authorization to look for his mother and three brothers in Hiroshima. He eventually found them, suffering from the effects of radiation from the bomb, and after trying to get his older brother into an American military hospital, that brother succumbed to radiation poisoning, but his mother and two younger brothers survived.

Following World War II, Fukuhara temporarily returned to the United States before he returned with the Army to serve in the US Army's occupation and reconstruction of Japan. His understanding of the language, culture, and tireless efforts were instrumental in developing post World War II United States - Japanese relations. He ended his distinguished career in uniform in 1971 as the military governor of the Yaeyama Islands Group in the Ryukyu Islands. Several of his military decorations include the Bronze Star, the Legion of Merit, and the Japanese Order of the Rising Sun, 3rd Class.

=== Later life ===
Following his military career, Fukuhara served in Federal service, again retiring in 1991. Among many decorations and citations, he earned the Distinguished Federal Civilian Service Medal by the President George H.W. Bush of the United States. He was inducted into the Military Intelligence Hall of Fame in 1988 and made a Distinguished Member. He resided in San Jose, California and attended the MI Hall of Fame Induction Ceremonies when able.

Fukuhara died in Honolulu, Hawaii on April 8, 2015, preceded in death by his wife Terry, he was survived by 4 children, and was laid to rest next to his wife at Golden Gate National Cemetery outside of San Francisco.

In December 2015, the Army dedicated the headquarters of the 500th Military Intelligence Brigade at Schofield Barracks in his name.

Author Pamela Rotner Sakamoto published the book "Midnight in Broad Daylight" in 2016, about the experiences of Harry and his family during World War II.
