= Robert Fukuda =

American lawyer and politician

Robert Kiyoshi Fukuda (Japanese: 福田 清, 1922 – July 12, 2013) was an American politician, lawyer and former member of the Hawaii House of Representatives from 1959 to 1962.

Fukuda was born in Honolulu, Hawaii, in 1922. He earned a bachelor's degree from the University of Hawaii. He then served in the United States Army Military Intelligence Service during World War II as a Japanese language interpreter and translator.

Fukuda later became a lawyer for the Hawaiian Homes Commission and the Hawaiian Homelands department for the Territory of Hawaii. He served as the deputy Attorney General for the Territory of Hawaii from 1953 until 1959.

In 1959, Fukuda was elected to the inaugural Hawaii State Legislature as a member of the Hawaii House of Representatives. He served in the House for three years. Fukuda later served as a United States Attorney in Hawaii from 1969 to 1973. He also became the manager of the United States Department of Housing and Urban Development's programs in Hawaii and Guam from 1982 to 1986.

In 2010, he was one of 6,000 Japanese American veterans of World War II to be awarded the Congressional Gold Medal.

Robert Fukuda died on July 12, 2013, at the age of 91. Hawaiian Governor Neil Abercrombie ordered all American and state flags to fly at half staff on August 11, 2013, in Fukuda's honor.
