= Ted Tsukiyama =

American lawyer

Ted Tatsuya Tsukiyama (Japanese: 築山 達哉, December 13, 1920 – February 13, 2019) was a Japanese American attorney and bonsai enthusiast. During World War II he was a member of the Varsity Victory Volunteers, 442 Regimental Combat Team, and the Military Intelligence Service. He was the first Japanese American to graduate from Yale Law School.

== Early life ==
Tsukiyama was born on December 13, 1920, in Kaimuki, a neighborhood in Honolulu, Hawaii. He was raised in Japan until he was 6 years old, when he moved back to Hawaii. He graduated from Roosevelt High School.

== Career ==
When Pearl Harbor was attacked on December 7, 1941, he was a student at the University of Hawaiʻi and a member of the Reserve Officers' Training Corps. After the attack, he was a member of the Hawaii Territorial Guard, until all Japanese Americans in the Guard were dismissed from service because of their ancestry. He joined the newly-formed Varsity Victory Volunteers, then the 442nd Regimental Combat Team. Once he entered the military, he was assigned to the Military Intelligence Service, where he was ordered to serve in Burma, listening in on radio transmissions from the Japanese Air Force.

When World War II ended, Tsukiyama returned to his studies, transferring to Indiana University Bloomington, where he earned a bachelor of arts in government in June 1947. He then attended Yale Law School, and was the first Japanese American to do so. After graduation, he became an attorney in Honolulu.

In 1951, he married his wife Fuku. They had three children.

Throughout his life, Tsukiyama was also a bonsai enthusiast. He helped found the Hawaii Bonsai Association with David Fukumoto, and in 1989 he helped to found the World Bonsai Friendship Federation. He earned an Order of the Rising Sun, Gold and Silver Rays in 2001 for his work with bonsai.

Tsukiyama died on February 13, 2019, from complications after a stroke.
