= Richard Sakakida =

US Army WWII intelligence agent and US Air Force officer

Richard Motoso Sakakida
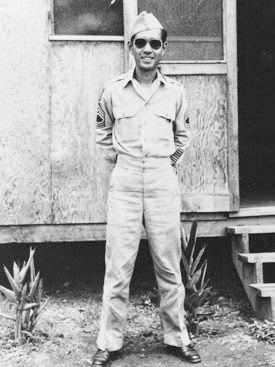
- Sgt Sakakida in Manila, 1946
- Born: November 19, 1920; Puʻunēnē, Territory of Hawaii
- Died: January 23, 1996 (aged 75); Fremont, California, U.S.
- Spouse: Cherry Kiyosaki
- Military career
- Allegiance: United States
- Branch: United States Army; United States Air Force
- Service years: 1941-1948 (Army), 1948-1975 (Air Force)
- Rank: Lt Colonel
- Units: Counterintelligence Corps; Military Intelligence Service
- Commands: Air Force Office of Special Investigations
- Conflicts: World War II - Philippines Campaign
- Awards: Bronze Star Medal; Legion of Merit; Distinguished Service Medal; Philippine Legion of Honor; Military Intelligence Hall of Fame

Richard Motoso Sakakida (Japanese: 榊田 元宗, November 19, 1920 – January 23, 1996) was a United States Army intelligence agent stationed in the Philippines at the outbreak of World War II. He was captured and tortured for months after the fall of the country to Imperial Japan, but managed to convince the Japanese that he was a civilian and was released. Employed by the Japanese Fourteenth Army (though still under suspicion), he gathered and passed along valuable information to the Philippine resistance. He also planned and participated in the mass escape of about 500 Filipino prisoners.

== Early life ==
Sakakida was born and raised in Hawaii. He was a Nisei, the youngest of four children of Japanese immigrant parents.

He was recruited by his high school Reserve Officers' Training Corps instructor into the United States Army in March 1941, while America was still neutral in World War II. Fluent in Japanese, he was sworn in as a sergeant along with fellow Nisei Arthur Komori, and he and Komori became the first two Japanese Americans to be assigned to the Corps of Intelligence Police, which became the Counterintelligence Corps shortly after America's entry in the war.

After intensive training, on April 7, 1941, he and Komori set sail for the Philippines, then an American possession, aboard the USS Republic (AP-33). Upon their arrival in Manila, they were assigned to spy on the Japanese community in the city, posing as merchant sailors who had jumped ship.

== World War II ==
After the outbreak of hostilities with Japan, Sakakida was rounded up by the Philippine Constabulary by mistake because of his civilian cover, and eventually ended up in Bilibid Prison, still maintaining his cover as a civilian; but he was recognized during detention and released.

He joined the American retreat, first to Bataan, then to Corregidor. His duties involved translating documents and interrogating Japanese prisoners of war. The situation on Corregidor being hopeless, Sakakida and Komori were eventually ordered to fly out on one of the last evacuation aircraft. Sakakida persuaded his superiors to let attorney Clarence Yamagata take his seat; Sakakida was unmarried, while Yamagata had a wife and children living in Japan and his pro-American activities had been more public. The airplane left on April 13, 1942, and managed to avoid Japanese interception.

Sakakida accompanied General Jonathan Wainwright as his interpreter during the surrender negotiations. After the surrender of Corregidor in early May, "Sakakida became the only Japanese-American to be captured by the Japanese forces in the Philippines." By Japanese law, he was considered to be a Japanese citizen because of his ancestry, and was charged with treason. The Kempeitai (military police) interrogated and tortured him for two months, but were unable to shake his story that he was a civilian who had worked for the United States Army under duress. Sakakida's mother had taken the precaution of voiding his Japanese citizenship at the Japanese consulate in Hawaii in August 1941, and the charge of treason was dropped.

He spent nearly a year in one prison after another, before his case was reviewed in February 1943 by Colonel Nishiharu, Chief Judge Advocate of Fourteenth Army Headquarters. Nishiharu concluded Sakakida was most likely innocent, and hired him in March as a staff translator and personal houseboy. However, he periodically faced devious attempts to trick him into betraying himself.

Despite this, security was lax, and Sakakida was often left alone with sensitive military documents, some of which he proceeded to memorize or steal. When a woman showed up at the Judge Advocate General's office to obtain a pass to visit her imprisoned guerrilla leader husband, Ernest Tupas, Sakakida took the risk of revealing his true identity to her. Mrs. Tupas put him in touch with the Philippine resistance, to whom he passed information.

He also devised a plan for a mass escape for Tupas and other Filipino prisoners. On a night in October 1943, it was set in motion. Sakakida posed as a Japanese officer and led a band of guerrillas into the prison at Muntinlupa. After knocking out or overpowering the unsuspecting guards, the rescuers freed nearly 500 inmates. Sakakida returned to his quarters with no one the wiser. According to the Associated Press 1996 obituary of Sakakida, three former guerrillas, including a Roman Catholic priest, claimed that he "fabricated his role in the escape." Senator Daniel Akaka of Hawaii responded that "Sakakida's story has 'been confirmed time and time again.'"

In December 1944, Sakakida decided that the time had finally come to flee into the jungle and managed to rejoin the Filipino guerrillas. He was injured by shrapnel in a firefight with a Japanese patrol. Cut off from the news, they survived on grass and berries. When he was finally found by American soldiers weeks after the war ended, he was wearing a torn and shreded Japanese uniform and was suffering from malaria, beriberi, and dysentery. He would be questioned by American officers about his identity. Luckily, his former colleague Arthur Komori, then working with CIC Brigadier General Elliott R. Thorpe in Tokyo had been looking for him and had sent word to CIC officers in the Philippines to be on the lookout for him and were able to vouch for him as a fellow CIC agent.

== Post-war ==
Sakakida returned to the Counterintelligence Corps and was promoted to master sergeant. He testified at the war crimes trial of General Tomoyuki Yamashita, as he had been an interpreter in the office of the general's Judge Advocate. He remained in Manila for eighteen months, working on war crime investigations where he encountered some of his former torturers, whom he forgave.

Following the war, Sakakida received a direct commission as a lieutenant and transferred to the United States Air Force. He married Cherry M. Kiyosaki of Maui on September 25, 1948 before being stationed in Tokyo where he served in the Office of Special Investigations (OSI) where he was responsible for coordinating Japanese police and investigative agencies to stop black market activities in Tokyo. Overall, he spent 19 of his 27 years in the Air Force in Japan, where he retired as commander of AFOSI in Japan as a lieutenant colonel in 1975.

Following retirement, he lived in Fremont, California, where he died of lung cancer on January 23, 1996. He was survived by his wife.

== Awards and honors ==
For his accomplishments, he was awarded the Legion of Merit, Bronze Star and two Commendation Medals, and was inducted into the Military Intelligence Hall of Fame. He also received four medals from the Philippine government, including the Philippine Legion of Honor (degree of Legionnaire), presented to him by Ambassador Raul Rabe at a ceremony at the Philippine Embassy in Washington, D.C., on April 15, 1994.

Due to the sensitivity of his work in the Philippines, he did not receive recognition from the Army for his injuries until Hawaii Senator Daniel Akaka introduced legislation to upgrade Sakakida's award to a Distinguished Service Medal and award him the Purple Heart, both of which were awarded posthumously in 1999.

== Bibliography ==
- A Spy in Their Midst: The World War II Struggle of a Japanese-American Hero, Richard Sakakida, as told to Wayne S. Kiyosaki. Madison Books, 1995. ISBN 1-56833-044-8
- Nisei Linguists: Japanese Americans in the Military Intelligence Service During World War II, James C. McNaughton. U.S. Army Center of Military History, 2007. ISBN 0-16-072957-2 (full text)

== See also ==
- Undercover Agent in Manila - Richard M. Sakakida, an account in Sakakida's own words of his espionage career, Japanese American Veterans Association website
