= Military Information Division (United States) =

First military intelligence branch of the United States Army (1885-1903)

The Military Information Division (MID) was the first military intelligence branch of the United States Army and the United States Department of War, operating from 1885 to 1903.

== History ==
The MID was established by Brigadier General Richard C. Drum, the then Adjutant General of the United States Army in October 1885 under his office in Washington, DC. Thus becoming the de facto first standing military intelligence agency of the United States. While the Union Army had a Bureau of Military Information, it reported to the Commanding General for less than a year prior to being disbanded at the end of the Civil War in 1865.

The original duties of the MID consisted of collecting military data on foreign nations. Drum also asked senior Army commanders to have their officers to submit intelligence reports from their travels to foreign nations. "Initially, the division acted as a relatively passive repository for military related information." In 1889, the MID saw the formation of, directed and controlled what became the Defense Attaché System, with United States Armed Forces officers being dispatched to London, Berlin, Paris, Vienna, and St. Petersburg. The Secretary of War, Redfield Proctor, required all information from the attachés to be analysed by the MID. "By 1898, the MID had 16 attaché posts in Europe, Mexico, and Japan. Until the early 1940s, the attaché system constituted the foundation of the Army’s strategic collection effort."

=== Spanish–American War ===
With the beginning of the Spanish–American War in April 1898, the United States Army entered a conflict with existing military intelligence preparation for the first time. Since 1882, the MID had been collecting terrain and order of battle intelligence on the Spanish in Cuba and the Caribbean and had consequently produced detailed maps of likely theaters of operation. Such intelligence was assisted by the reports of the United States Army attaché in Madrid, Captain Tasker H. Bliss who became the Chief of Staff of the United States Army, on Spanish deployments in the region. In April 1898, the Chief of MID, Major Arthur L. Wagner ordered two experienced military observers of MID to be deployed to the region to collect specific information on Spanish defence capabilities before the deployment of American forces. First Lieutenant Andrew S. Rowan was deployed to Cuba and First Lieutenant Henry H. Whitney was deployed to Puerto Rico. "As the war progressed, the MID published comprehensive handbooks for both Caribbean countries." The Spanish–American War ended in August 1898 with an American victory.

=== Philippine–American War ===
After the American naval victory in the Battle of Manila Bay of May 1898, the American troops were deployed to the Philippines in July 1898. With American victory in the Spanish–American War in August 1898, fighting broke out as the Filipinos sought independence. This led to the Philippine–American War in June 1899. Consequently, the American Military Governor of the Philippines formed the Bureau of Insurgent Records (BIR) to translate and collate captured documents and to provide information about the Filipino forces beyond tactical reconnaissance. In December 1900, the bureau became the Division of Military Information (DMI) under the United States Military Government of the Philippines and was responsible for military intelligence and counterinsurgency capabilities. The Chief of DMI, Captain Ralph Van Deman who had served on the staff of the Chief of MID Major Arthur L. Wagner and was later called the "Father of American Military Intelligence", expanded the capabilities of the DMI to include a mapping section, improved liaison with other agencies, relayed intelligence to the field commanders, provided photographs and descriptions of known Filipino insurgents, and coordinated localised intelligence officers to gather information on the surrounding terrain, attitudes of local villagers, and the dispositions of Filipino insurgent groups. In 1902, the DMI became a branch the MID with the end of the Philippine–American War in July 1902.

== Reorganisation into Army General Staff ==
In 1903, Secretary of War Elihu Root reorganised the United States Department of War and also established the United States Army General Staff to coordinate and perform administrative, planning and intelligence functions. The Second Division of the United States Army General Staff consequently acquired the MID from the Adjutant General's Office. The Second Division was given four major duties: collecting and disseminating information on foreign countries; directing the work of the attaché system; supervising mapping, and maintaining a reference collection. "For the moment, the intelligence function had achieved equal standing with other staff missions."

== See also ==
- Cuban Pacification
- United States Army Military Intelligence Corps
- United States Army Intelligence and Security Command
- Office of Naval Intelligence
- Military Intelligence Division (United States Army)
- G-2 (intelligence)
