= John Aiso =

American judge (1909–1987)

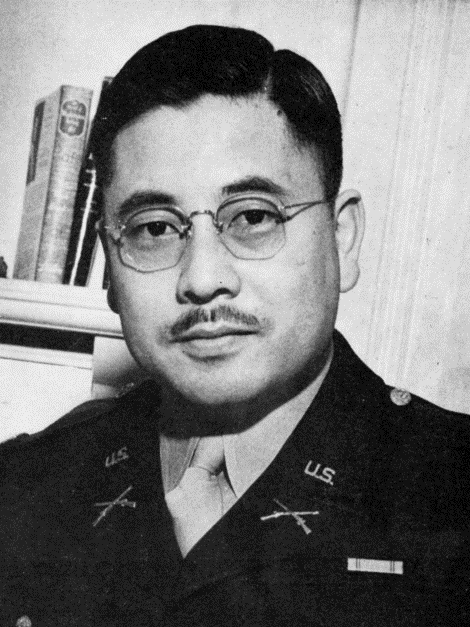
- Aiso, c. 1944

Justice of the California Courts of Appeal
- In office November 4, 1968 – December 31, 1972
- Appointed by: Ronald Reagan

Judge of the Los Angeles County Superior Court
- In office September 11, 1957 – November 4, 1968
- Appointed by: Goodwin Knight

Judge of the Los Angeles Municipal Court
- In office September 18, 1953 – September 11, 1957
- Appointed by: Earl Warren
- Preceded by: Ben Rosenthal

Personal details
- Born: John Fujio Aiso; December 14, 1909 Burbank, California, U.S.
- Died: December 29, 1987 (aged 78) Burbank, California, U.S.
- Education: Brown University (BA); Harvard University (LLB); Chuo University
- Awards: Legion of Merit; Order of the Rising Sun

Military service
- Allegiance: United States
- Branch/service: United States Army
- Years of service: 1941–1947
- Rank: Lt Col
- Unit: Director, Military Intelligence Service Language School
- Battles/wars: World War II

John Fujio Aiso (Japanese: 相磯 藤雄, December 14, 1909 – December 29, 1987) was an American nisei military leader, lawyer and judge. Aiso was the Director and head instructor of the Military Intelligence Service Language School, and the highest-ranking Japanese American in the U.S. Army during World War II. He was also the first Japanese American appointed as a judge in the contiguous United States.

== Early life ==
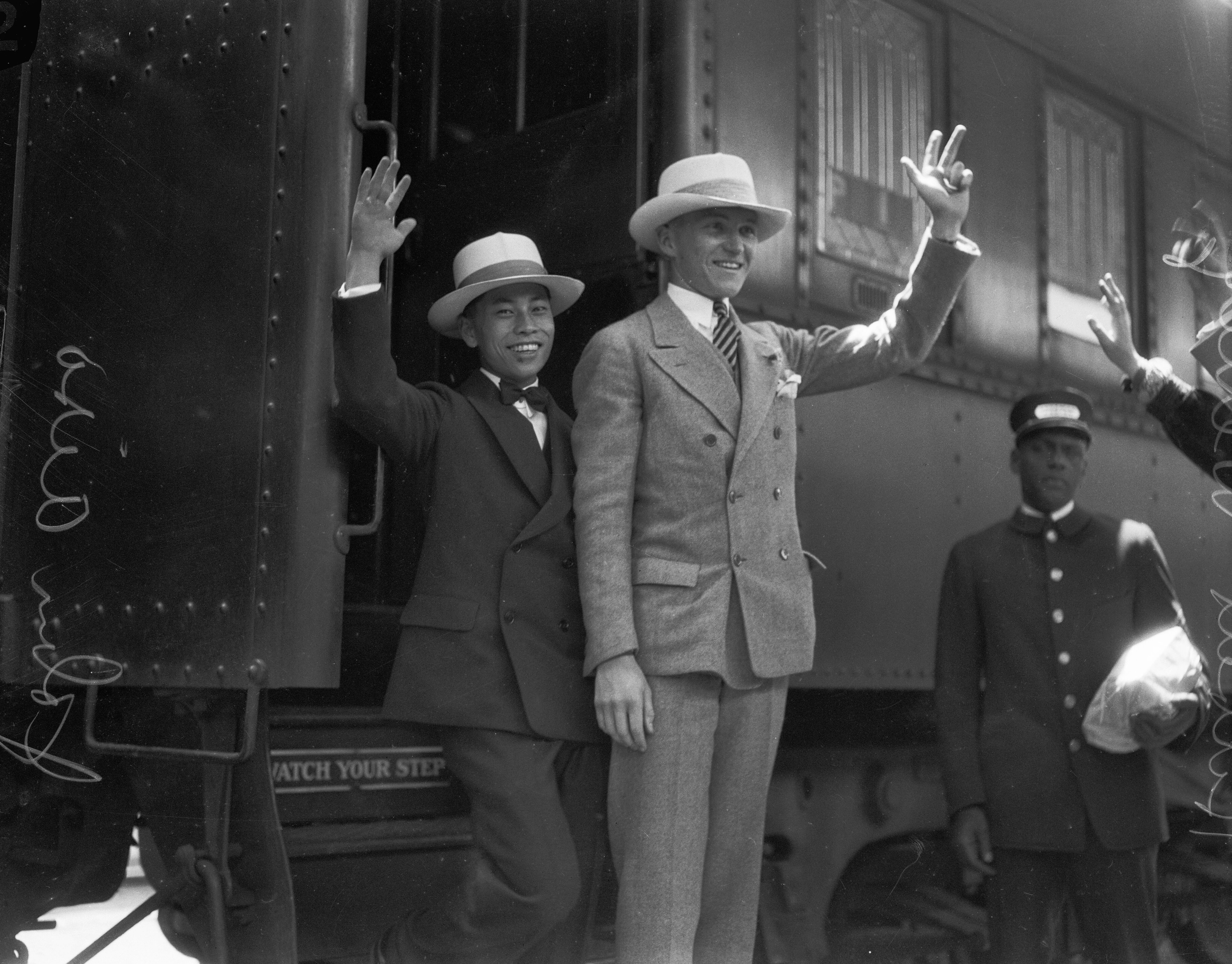
Aiso (left) and Herbert Wenig wave to supporters as they prepare to board a train headed to Washington D.C., where Wenig would compete in the National Oratorical Contest, May 29, 1926

Born in the Los Angeles suburb of Burbank, Aiso was an excellent student. He later explained that the amount of effort he put into his schoolwork was a way of counteracting anti-Japanese prejudice, recounting one of his first memories of being called a "Jap" by an elderly woman on a streetcar. He was elected student body president of his junior high school in 1922, but the victory proved to be short lived: parents protested a Japanese American holding the position, and student government was suspended until Aiso left the school. He went on to attend Hollywood High School, where he drew national attention when he won the school's oratorical competition on the U.S. Constitution in 1926. However, he was once again forced to step down, when he was told he could not compete at the national championship and would instead have to coach his runner up.

== Education and career ==
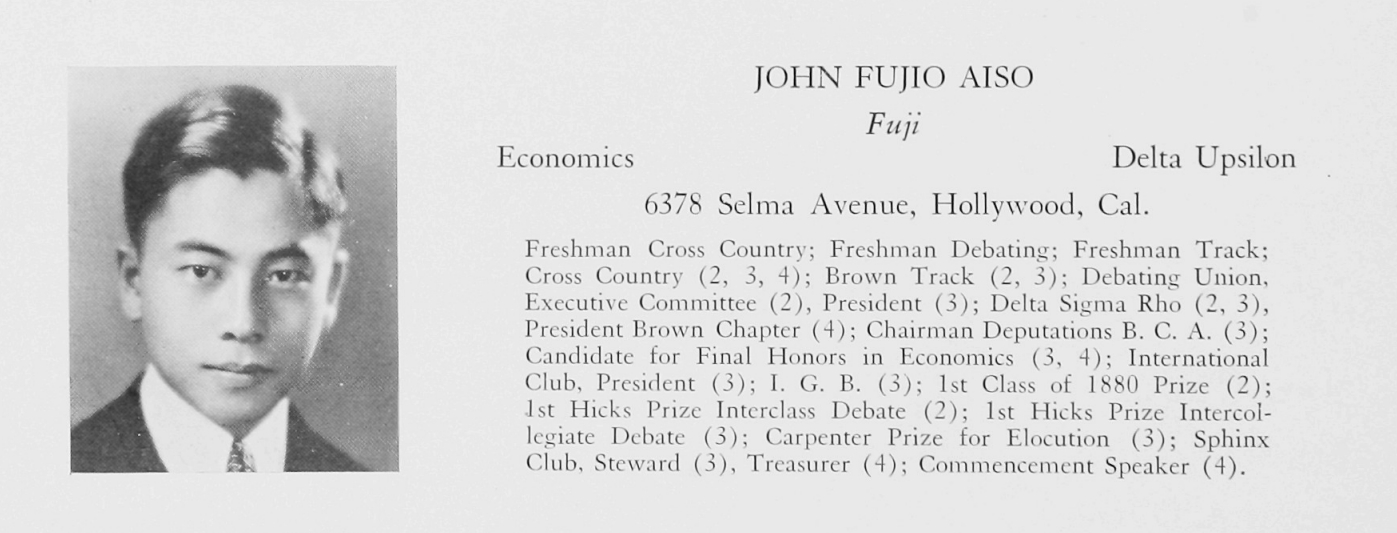
Aiso in the Brown University yearbook, 1931

After graduating at the top of his Hollywood High School class in 1926, Aiso spent a year in Japan, studying Japanese at Seijo University in Tokyo. He returned to the United States after receiving a scholarship to attend Brown University, where he captained the debate team and majored in economics, graduating cum laude and serving as class valedictorian in 1931. He continued his studies at Harvard Law School, completing his degree in 1934.

Between 1935 and 1952, he worked in private practice in Los Angeles and New York City. In 1936, he spent another year in Tokyo, working with Japanese banks on behalf of his U.S. law firm and studying Japanese law at Chuo University. From 1937 to 1940, he worked for the British American Tobacco Company in Japanese-occupied Manchuria.

After his return to the United States, Aiso was drafted into the army, reporting for active duty in April 1941. Originally stationed at Fort MacArthur, Aiso was assigned menial tasks due to discrimination. He was working in the motor pool when his proficiency in the Japanese language was recognized by Fourth Army G-2 officer, Capt. Kai E. Rasmussen. Rasmussen had been tasked with developing a Japanese language school, and he transferred Aiso to the hastily formed (and, at first, secret) Military Intelligence Service Language School (MISLS). Recruited by MISLS head Lt Col John Weckerling as an instructor at the school, Aiso, then a Private First Class, couldn't be expected to teach officers, and the government forbid Japanese Americans from being commissioned. Aiso was instead discharged, transferred to Reserve service and hired as a War Department Civilian.

Aiso distinguished himself in his role, earned praise from his commanders and his fellow instructors, and was soon appointed the Director of Academic Training, a position normally held by a Lieutenant Colonel. When the Chief of Army Intelligence, General Clayton Lawrence Bissell, visited the school in 1944, he was outraged that a civilian was placed in command of military personnel, and he went back to Washington to demand a direct commission for Aiso to Major. In this position, he became the highest-ranking Japanese American in the United States Army during the Second World War, eventually separating from active duty with the rank of lieutenant colonel.

Under his leadership as director of academic training, the MISLS rapidly expanded. He recruited and trained a staff of over 150, developed course materials, and set the highest academic standards. The more than 6,000 graduates contributed immeasurably to the American victory over Imperial Japan and to the peace that followed: General Charles Willoughby credited Aiso's MIS graduates with shortening the war by two years and saving close to a million lives.

After the Allied victory in August 1945, Aiso refocused the MISLS curriculum to prepare students for roles in the occupation of Japan. In January 1946, he transferred to Gen Douglas MacArthur's staff as a legal assistant under Willoughby, MacArthur's G-2 chief. Aiso worked in the investigation and enforcement of the political purge dictated by the Potsdam Declaration. In February 1947, he was released from active duty and returned to private law practice in Los Angeles. He was later promoted to a colonel in the Army Reserve, before retiring in 1965.

In 1950, he received an honorary master's degree from Brown University. In 1952, he served as a Superior Court Commissioner for one year. Aiso was then appointed to the Los Angeles Municipal Court in 1953, where he served until he was elevated to the Los Angeles Superior Court in 1957. He was the first Japanese American to enter the California State Judiciary when then Governor Ronald Reagan appointed Aiso as an associate justice of the California Court of Appeal, Second Appellate District, on November 4, 1968.

== Awards and accolades ==
President Lyndon B. Johnson awarded Aiso the Legion of Merit in 1965 for his service during World War II. In 1984, he received the 3rd Class Order of the Rising Sun for his contributions to understanding and friendship between the United States and Japan. Aiso was inducted into the Military Intelligence Corps Hall of Fame in 1991. The Aiso Library at the Defense Language Institute (DLI) Foreign Language Center, the successor to the MISLS, is named in his honor, as is the Judge John Aiso Street in the Little Tokyo community of Los Angeles, a one-block segment of San Pedro Street between Temple Boulevard and 1st Street.

== Death ==
Aiso, 78, was filling his car at a Hollywood gas station when he was attacked and knocked to the pavement. He died two weeks later in a Burbank hospital on December 29, 1987, from a head injury sustained in the attempted mugging.

== See also ==
- Hong Yen Chang – first Asian American licensed to practice law in the U.S. (1888)
- Herbert Choy – first Asian American U.S. federal judge (1971)
- Kathryn Doi Todd – first female Asian American judge in the U.S. (1978)
- Masaji Marumoto – first Asian American territorial court justice (1956)
- Cyrus Nils Tavares – first Native Hawaiian U.S. federal judge (1960)
- Wilfred Tsukiyama – first Asian American state chief justice (1959)
- Delbert E. Wong – first Chinese American judge in the continental U.S. (1959)
