= Arthur Komori =

Arthur Satoshi Komori (Japanese: 小森 敏, 1915–2000) was a Japanese-American who served as a spy for the United States in the colonial Philippines.

== Service ==
Eight months before the Attack on Pearl Harbor, Arthur Komori was recruited by American military intelligence while attending the University of Hawaiʻi. He enlisted in the Corps of Intelligence Police of the United States Army on 13 March 1941. On 22 April 1941, he was sent to the Philippines to gather intelligence, where he was a colleague of Richard Sakakida. He was relieved of his assignments following the outbreak of World War II. He fled to Australia following the fall of Bataan. He continued to serve in U.S intelligence in Australia, and rose to the rank of Chief Warrant Officer. Following the end of the war, he was stationed in Japan.

== After the War ==
He served as an attorney and formerly served as a District Court judge. By November 20, 1999, he had been diagnosed with senile dementia and Alzheimer's. Komori, died in Wilcox Hospital in 2000 at the age of 84. He is survived by his wife, Rosa, daughter Rosemary Gardner, brother David, sisters Aiko Hirai, Mary Setlak, Martha Yasue and Viola Imai, and two grandchildren.

== Recognition ==
Komori was awarded the Bronze Star Medal in December 1945. In 1988 he was elected to the Military Intelligence Hall of Fame at Fort Huachuca, Arizona.
