= Teruto Tsubota =

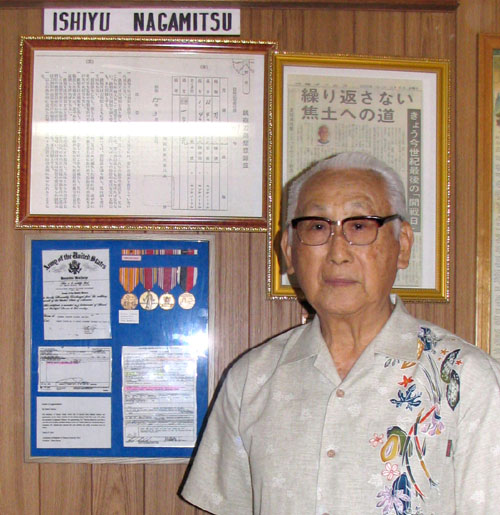
Teruto Tsubota in 2007

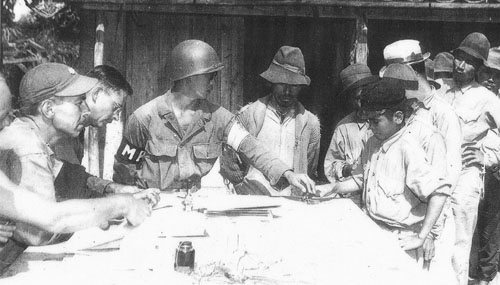
Tsubota, wearing Military Police armband, with Okinawan refugees

Teruto "Terry" Tsubota (Japanese: 坪田 輝人, July 28, 1922 – May 22, 2013) was a second-generation Japanese American (Nisei) and a United States Marine. Born in Pahoa, Hawaii, Tsubota was credited with valiantly saving hundreds of civilian lives while serving as a Military Intelligence Service (MIS) combat translator with the 6th Marine Division during the Battle of Okinawa in 1945, when he was attached to the 4th Marine Regiment.

After the war, Tsubota stayed in Okinawa Prefecture. In 1947, he married Kiyoko, a young local woman who had survived being conscripted by the Imperial Japanese Army as a nurse and whom he met in a refugee camp. Together, they raised three children. He retired from the U.S. government service in January 1993. Tsubota remained a hero to the Okinawans as the man who personally prevented many combat deaths and civilian suicides during the battle. The Japanese Army forces had misled the native Okinawan population that they would suffer rape and violence from the invading Allied forces; they urged Okinawans to kill themselves or others in advance of defeat.

He accompanied Okinawa's governor and other officials during Bill Clinton's visit to the prefecture in 2000, and was one of the honored guests at the 59th anniversary of the battle held in the Okinawa Prefectural Peace Memorial Museum in 2004.

In 2007, the story of Tsubota and his fellow Japanese-American translators was told by James C. McNaughton in Nisei Linguists: Japanese Americans in the Military Intelligence Service During World War II.

Teruto Tsubota died in Lihue, Hawaii, at the age of 90.
