= G-2 (intelligence) =

Military intelligence staff of a unit in the United States Army

Seal of the U.S. Army Military Intelligence Corps

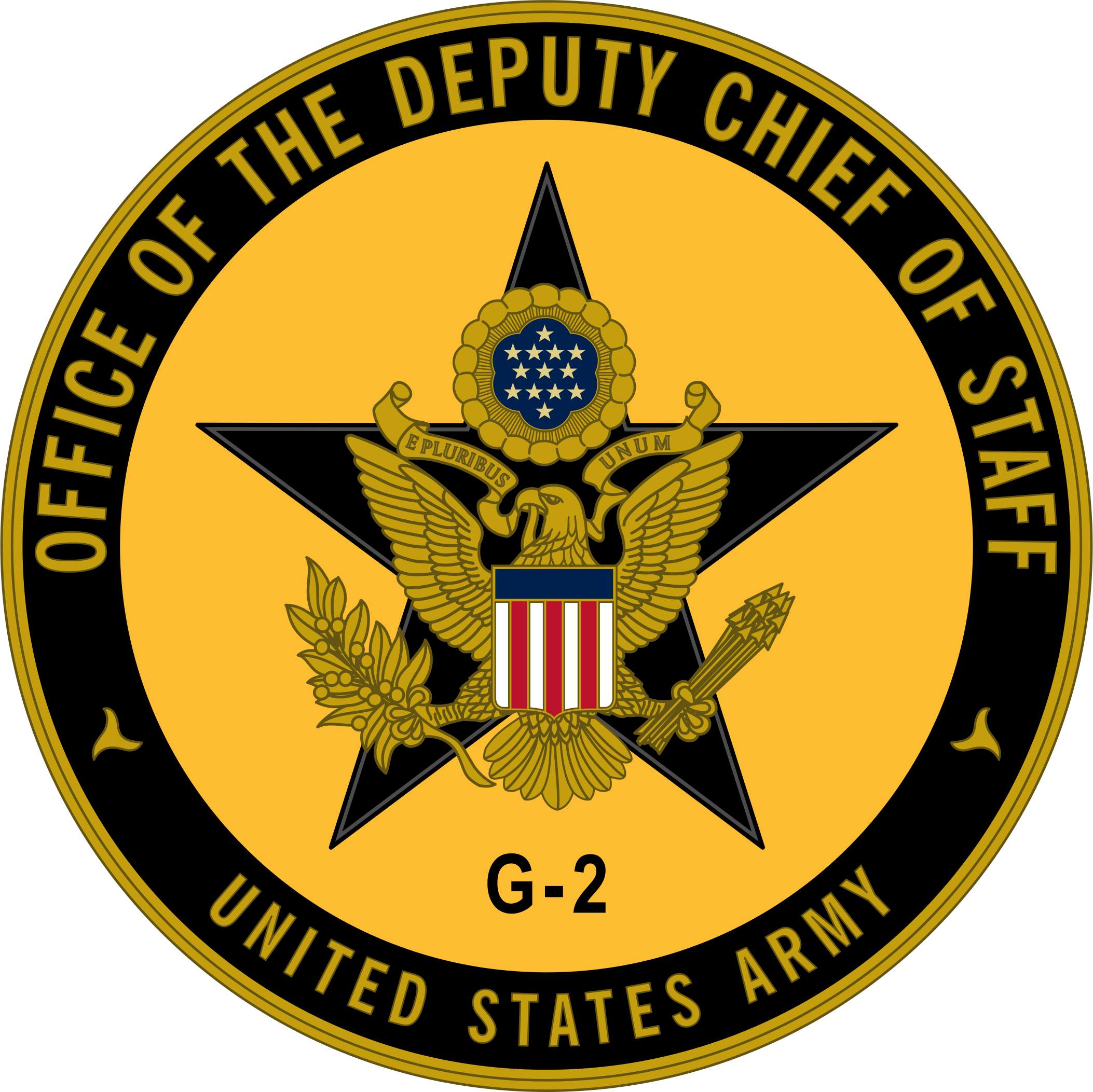
Seal of the U.S. Army Office of the Deputy Chief of Staff, Intelligence (G-2)

G-2 refers to the military intelligence staff in the United States Army at the Divisional Level and above. The position is generally headed by a Lieutenant General. It is contrasted with G–1 (personnel), G–3 (operations), G–4 (logistics), G–5 (planning), G–6 (network), G-7 (training), G-8 (finance), and G-9 (civil-military operations). These "G" sections have counterparts in other branches of the service, with the U.S. Navy using an N– designation, the U.S. Air Force using the A- designation, and the Joint Staff using the J- designation. It is the higher level function of the S-2 (intelligence) with the "S" signifying intelligence directorates at the battalion or brigade level.

== Deputy Chief of Staff for Intelligence (G-2) ==
The 48th and current Deputy Chief of Staff for Intelligence G–2, is Lieutenant General Tony Hale (USA). LTG Hale is "the senior advisor to the Secretary of the Army and Chief of Staff of the Army for all aspects of Intelligence, Counterintelligence and Security, and responsible for the training, equipping, policy, and oversight of the Army Intelligence and Security Enterprise".

== History ==
G-2 intelligence played an important role during World War II, both aiding fighting forces and in special missions such as those of T-Force and Operation Alsos. G-2 intelligence gathering and interpretation traces its history to the American Revolution. The Military Intelligence Service was formed during World War II. In time, this evolved into the Military Intelligence Corps, one of the basic branches of the United States Army.

== See also ==
- Staff (military)
- Military Intelligence Corps (United States Army)
- Counter-intelligence
- Counterintelligence Corps
- MI5, the British intelligence agency tasked with domestic counter-intelligence and security
- MI6, the British intelligence agency tasked with foreign intelligence
