= Georgia Cryptologic Center =

Coordinates: 33°24′47″N 82°10′08″W

- NSA Georgia
- Active: 2012–present
- Country: United States
- Role: Signals intelligence cyberspace operations, and cybersecurity operations
- Size: 604,000 ft^{2} (56,100 m^{2})
- Part of: National Security Agency
- Garrison/HQ: Fort Gordon
- Nickname: Sweet Tea

The Georgia Cryptologic Center (GCC) or NSA Georgia is a U.S. National Security Agency (NSA) and Central Security Service (CSS) facility located within Fort Gordon, located outside of Augusta, Georgia. The 604,000 ft^{2} (56,100 m^{2}) facility opened on March 5, 2012, at a cost of $286 million. The GCC's facilities have the capacity to employ up to 4,000 personnel. Its primary focus is on signals intelligence intercepts from Europe, the Middle East, and North Africa. The facility is known by the codename "Sweet Tea".

== Operations ==
According to the NSA, the Georgia Cryptologic Center "specializes in working closely with military customers to understand their operations, their requirements and their culture to ensure that signals intelligence is tailored and responsive to the needs of the warfighter." The Georgia Cryptologic Center is staffed by both civilian contractors and by military personnel from the United States Army Intelligence and Security Command's 706th Military Intelligence Group, also stationed at Fort Gordon, who specialize in signals intelligence. When the facility opened, the proposed ratio of military to civilian personnel was approximately 3:1. As of 2020, Fort Gordon is also the headquarters of United States Army Cyber Command (ARCYBER), which works closely alongside NSA Georgia.

The facilities's personnel include Tailored Access Operations (TAO) units and Persian-language translators.

== History ==
Before opening the facility at Fort Gordon, the NSA/CSS had a smaller Regional Security Operations Center located at Fort Gordon. Named the Gordon Regional Security Operations Center, it was established in 1994 and operated under this name until it was renamed to NSA/CSS Georgia in June 2005.

Construction on the Georgia Cryptologic Center facility began in March 2007, During construction the facility was not referred to as an NSA facility in any documentation and was referred to as "Sweet Tea". The facility opened in 2012. Press were invited to the opening ceremony, though cameras were not allowed at or near the facility.

The facility made international headlines in 2017 when Reality Winner, a civilian contractor employed at the Georgia Cryptologic Center, was arrested after sending a top-secret report about Russian interference in the 2016 United States elections to the news organization The Intercept.

== See also ==
- Colorado Cryptologic Center
- European Cryptologic Center
- Hawaii Cryptologic Center
- Texas Cryptologic Center
