= United States Army Intelligence and Security Command =

U.S. Army direct reporting unit

U.S. Army Intelligence and Security Command
- INSCOM Shoulder Sleeve Insignia
- Active: 1977–present
- Country: United States
- Branch: United States Army
- Type: Direct reporting unit
- Role: Military intelligence, Information operations
- Size: 10,000+
- Headquarters: Fort Belvoir, Virginia
- Nickname: INSCOM
- Decorations: Superior Unit Award with Oak Leaf
- Website: Official website

Commanders
- Current commander: MG Rhett R. Cox
- Chief Warrant Officer: CW5 Jamie S. Turner
- Command Sergeant Major: CSM Anthony Rangel III

Insignia
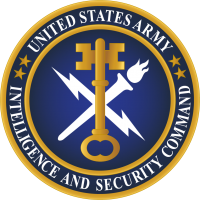
- INSCOM Seal

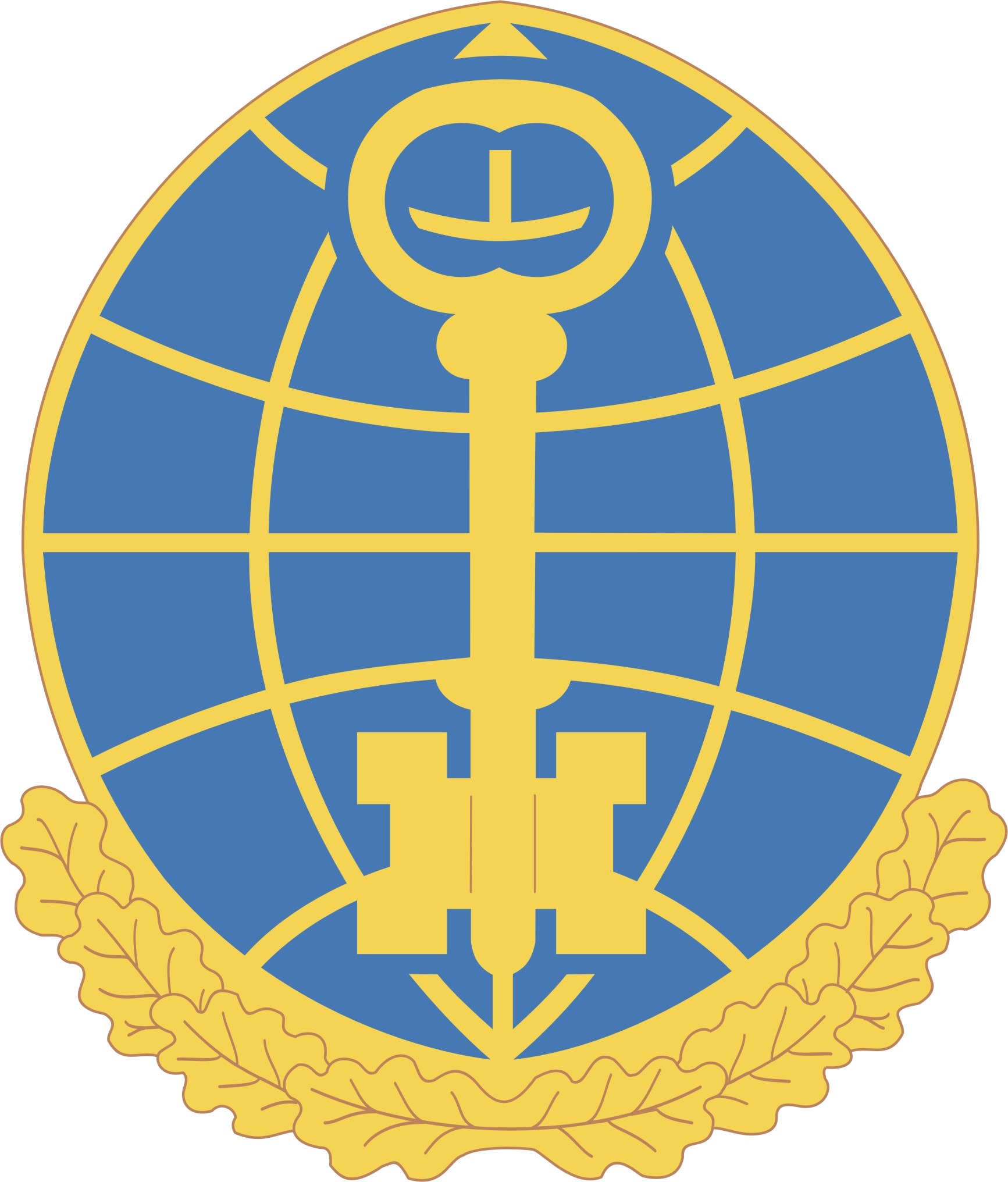
- Distinctive unit insignia

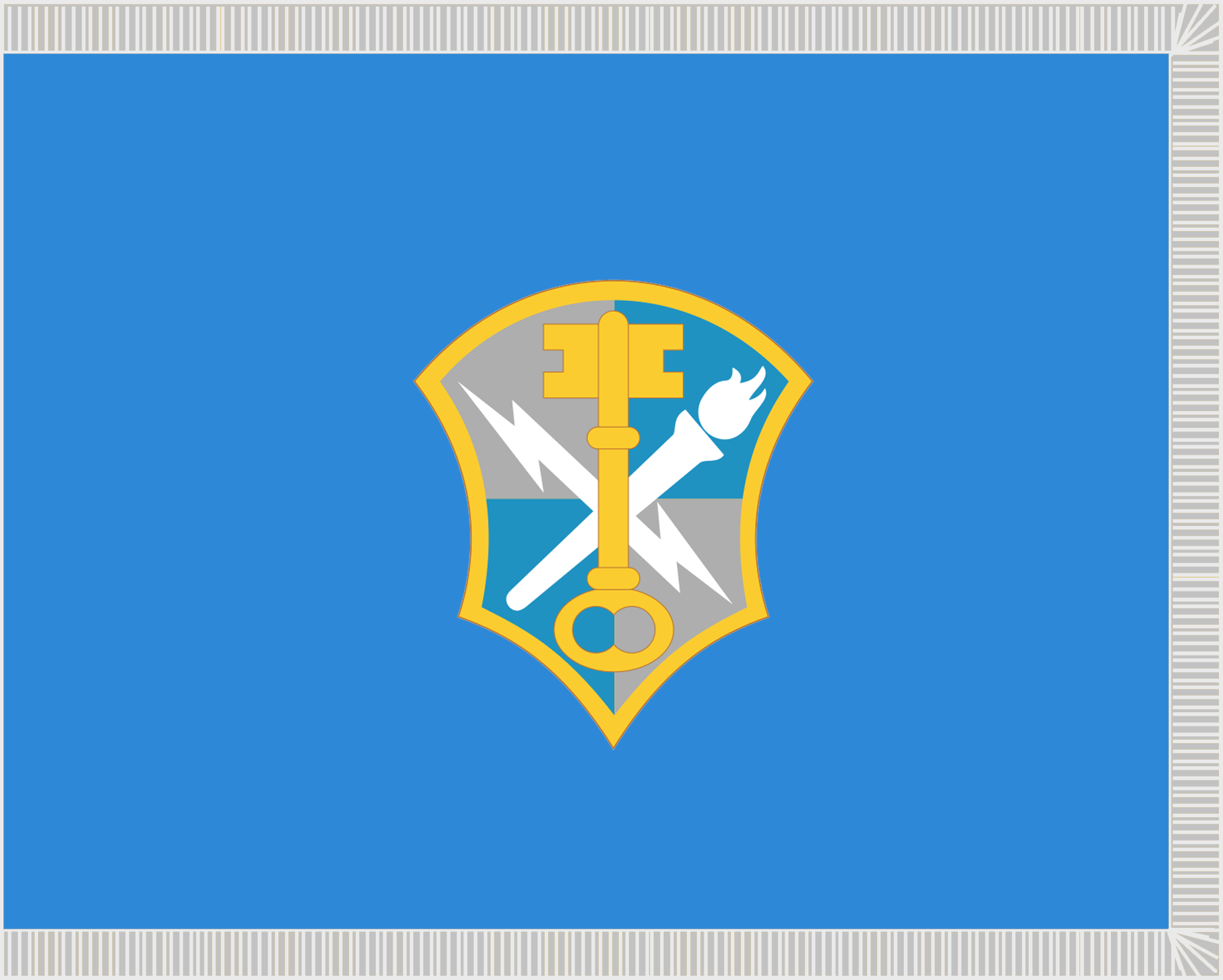
- US Army Intelligence and Security Command Flag

The United States Army Intelligence and Security Command (INSCOM) is a direct reporting unit that conducts intelligence, security, and information operations for United States Army commanders, partners in the Intelligence Community, and national decision-makers. INSCOM is headquartered at Fort Belvoir, Virginia.

INSCOM contributes units to the National Security Agency (NSA), the United States' unified signals intelligence (SIGINT) organization. Within the NSA, INSCOM and its counterparts in the Navy, Air Force, Space Force, Coast Guard, and Marine Corps comprise the Central Security Service. INSCOM's budget has been estimated to be approximately $6 billion.

As a direct reporting unit, INSCOM reports directly to the chief of staff of the Army.

== Mission ==
INSCOM collects intelligence information in all intelligence disciplines to provide unit commanders with intelligence for the battlefield and the focus of combat power. The organization also conducts intelligence production activities, ranging from intelligence preparation of the battlefield to situation development, SIGINT analysis, imagery exploitation, and science and technology intelligence production. INSCOM also has significant responsibilities in counterintelligence, force protection, electronic warfare, and information warfare. Additionally, INSCOM supports force modernization and training.

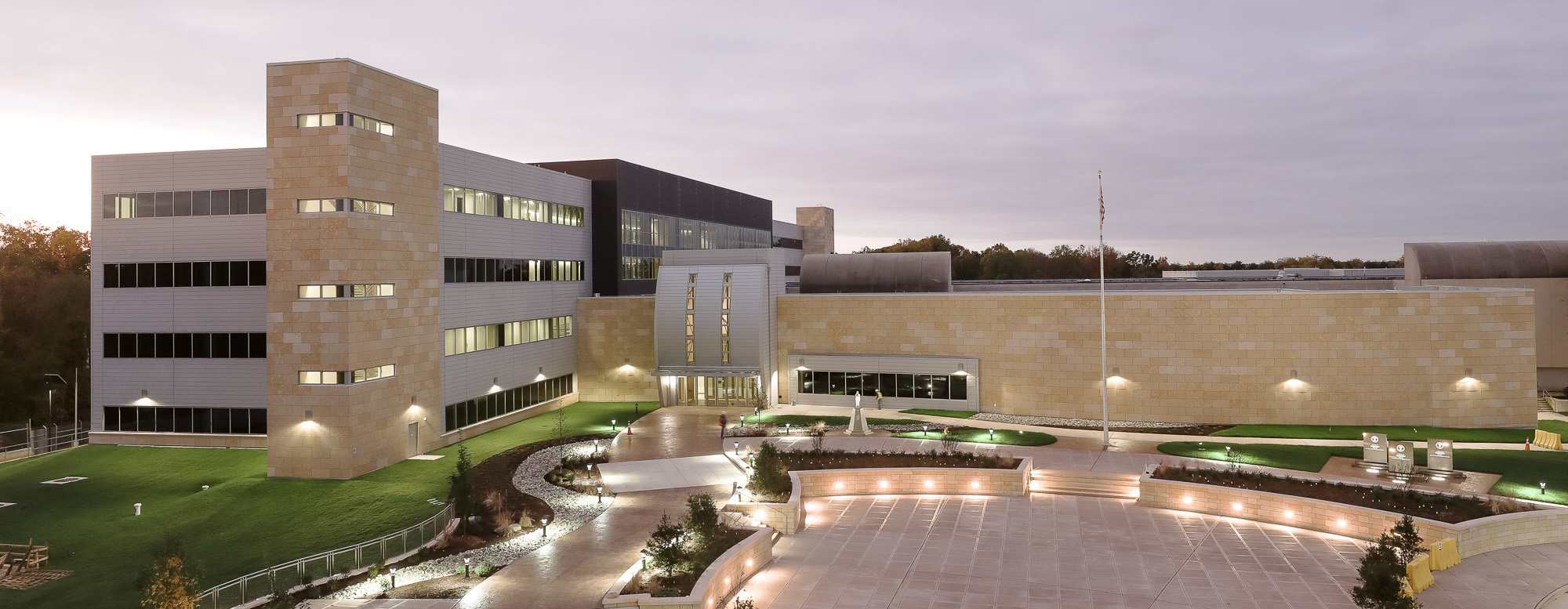
INSCOM Headquarters at Ft. Belvoir following 2019 expansion

INSCOM's stated vision for operations includes: (1) conducting and supporting relevant intelligence, security and information operations for U.S. Army, joint and combined forces; (2) optimizing national/theater/tactical partnerships; (3) exploiting leading edge technology; and (4) meeting the challenge of today, tomorrow and the 21st Century.

== Structure ==
- U.S. Army Counterintelligence Command

Headquartered at Fort Meade, Maryland, Army Counterintelligence (ACI) Command (ACIC) is a one-star U.S. Army command that is delegated all Secretary of the Army counterintelligence (CI) authorities as the Army's sole Military Department CI Organization (MDCO). ACIC conducts worldwide CI activities to detect, identify, neutralize, and exploit foreign intelligence entities, international terrorists, insider threats, and other foreign adversaries to protect the U.S. Army and the Department of Defense.

- 66th Military Intelligence Brigade

Located in Wiesbaden, Germany, the 66th conducts theater level multi-discipline intelligence and security operations and, when directed, deploys prepared forces to conduct joint/combined expeditionary and contingency operations in support of United States Army Europe and U.S. European Command.

- 116th Military Intelligence Brigade (Aerial Intelligence)

Located at Fort Gordon, Georgia, the 116th conducts 24/7 tasking, collection, processing, exploitation, dissemination and feedback operations for multiple aerial-ISR systems utilizing the Distributed Common Ground System-Army (DCGS-A).

- 207th Military Intelligence Brigade (Theater)

Located at Caserma Ederle and Caserma Longare, Vicenza, Italy. It conducts full-spectrum intelligence in support of U.S. Army Africa and United States Africa Command (USAFRICOM or AFRICOM) in order to set the intelligence architecture for the theater, disrupt transnational and trans-regional threats, and promote regional stability in Africa while building and maintaining intelligence readiness.

- 259th Military Intelligence Brigade (Expeditionary)

Located at Joint Base Lewis-McChord, WA. It provides operational intelligence to the Combatant Commands and the national intelligence community.

- 300th Military Intelligence Brigade (Linguist)

Provides trained and ready linguist and military intelligence soldiers to commanders from brigade through Army level. Located in Draper, Utah.

- 470th Military Intelligence Brigade

Located at Fort Sam Houston, Texas, the 470th provides timely and fused multi-discipline intelligence in support of United States Army South, U.S. Southern Command, and other national intelligence agencies.

- 500th Military Intelligence Brigade

The 500th Military Intelligence Brigade located at Schofield Barracks, Hawaii, provides multi-disciplined intelligence support for joint and coalition war fighters within United States Army Pacific and the U.S. Pacific Command area of responsibility.

- 501st Military Intelligence Brigade

The 501st Military Intelligence Brigade supports combined forces operations in Korea.

- 513th Military Intelligence Brigade

Located at Fort Gordon, Georgia, the 513th deploys in strength or in tailored elements to conduct multi-disciplined intelligence and security operations in support of United States Army Central, U.S. Central Command, U.S. Southern Command, and other theater Army commands.

- 704th Military Intelligence Brigade

Conducts synchronized full-spectrum signals intelligence, computer network and information assurance operations directly and through the National Security Agency to satisfy national, joint, combined and Army information superiority requirements.

- 706th Military Intelligence Group

Formerly the 116th Military Intelligence Group, it is located at Fort Gordon, Georgia. It provides personnel, intelligence assets and technical support to conduct signals intelligence operations within the National Security Agency/Central Security Service Georgia (NSA/CSS Georgia) and worldwide.

- 780th Military Intelligence Brigade

Located at Fort Meade, the 780th conducts expeditionary and remote cyber attack, cyber exploitation, and cyber defense operations of Army and Defense information networks.

- Army Cryptologic Office (ACO)

Located at Fort Meade, ACO serves as the Army G2 and Service Cryptologic Component (SCC) representative to provide expert cryptologic leadership, support, guidance and advice to U.S. Army Warfighters and Intelligence leaders. Lead the Army’s Cryptologic effort to satisfy Signals Intelligence (SIGINT) requirements by leveraging NSA Extended Enterprise, Intelligence Community, Sister Services and Service Laboratories. Ensure timely and effective support to operations by providing optimized capabilities, training and resources.

- Army Field Support Center (AFSC)

Located at Fort Meade, AFSC provides specialized operational, administrative and personnel management support to Department of the Army and other Department of Defense Services and Agencies as directed.

- Army Operations Group (AOG)

Located at Fort Meade, AOG conducts Human Intelligence (HUMINT) operations and provide expertise in support of ground component priority intelligence requirements using a full spectrum of human intelligence collection methods.

- Central Clearance Facility (CCF)

Located at Fort Meade, the CCF serves as the U.S. Army’s executive agency for personnel security determinations in support of Army missions world-wide.

- Army Threat Integration Center (ARTIC)

A threat monitoring center, the result of the 2013 transformation of the Antiterrorism Operations and Intelligence Cell (ATOIC)

- National Ground Intelligence Center

Located in Charlottesville, Virginia, NGIC is the Defense Department's primary producer of ground forces technical intelligence and is the Army's premier provider of intelligence products.

- Army Geospatial Intelligence Battalion (AGB) Located in the National Geospatial-Intelligence Agency headquarters on Fort Belvoir, Virginia, AGB is the primary source for Army geospatial intelligence products and joint GEOINT operations.

== History ==
=== Merger and creation of INSCOM ===
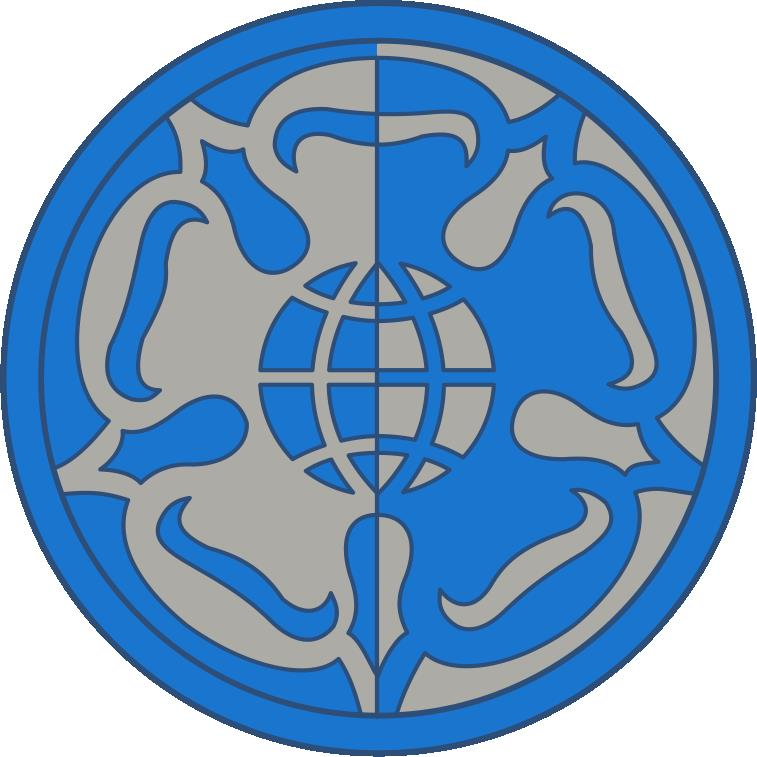
US Army Intelligence Agency 1976-1977

On 1 January 1977, the United States Army Intelligence and Security Command (INSCOM) was organized at Arlington Hall Station, Virginia, to provide the U.S. Army with a single organization for conducting multi-discipline intelligence, security operations, and electronic warfare at the level above corps. The new organization merged the former U.S. Army Security Agency, the signal intelligence and signal security organizations previously located at Arlington Hall, Virginia, the U.S. Army Intelligence Agency (USAINTA), a counterintelligence and human intelligence agency based at Fort Meade, Maryland, and several intelligence production units formerly controlled by the Assistant Chief of Staff for Intelligence and U.S. Army Forces Command. Brigadier General (later Major General) William I. Rolya, former commanding general of the Army Security Agency, became INSCOM's first commanding general.

USAINTA was a reorganization of the United States Army Intelligence Command (USAINTC) which had been formed in 1965 to have a centralized command over all Counter Intelligence units in the Continental United States (CONUS).

On 1 October 1977, the former U.S. Army Intelligence Agency headquarters was integrated into INSCOM. The command established a unified intelligence production element, the Intelligence and Threat Analysis Center, on 1 January 1978. Additionally, INSCOM assumed command of three military intelligence groups located overseas: the 66th Military Intelligence Group in Germany, the 470th Military Intelligence Group in Panama, and the 500th Military Intelligence Group in Japan. These groups were transformed into multidisciplinary units by incorporating former Army Security Agency assets into the previously existing elements. A fourth such group, the 501st Military Intelligence Brigade, was soon organized in South Korea. All of these groups were eventually reorganized and re-designated as brigades.

=== Parapsychologic research ===
In association with the Defense Intelligence Agency, and under the leadership of commanding general Albert Stubblebine, INSCOM attempted to use parapsychologic methods such as remote viewing in operation Center Lane. This was done as late as 1981. Other U.S. intelligence services attempted similar projects during the same period, most notably the Stargate Project by the Central Intelligence Agency.

=== In caselaw ===
In 2014, a case was litigated by the Electronic Frontier Foundation against the Central Intelligence Agency and other federal departments and agencies, and it was determined that the agencies inappropriately handled an FOIA request regarding a special agent assigned to the U.S. Army Intelligence and Security Command who illegally issued a national security letter.

== List of commanding generals ==
No.	Commanding General		Term		
No.	Portrait	Name	Took office	Left office	Duration
-	David B. Lacquement	Major General; David B. Lacquement	2007	16 October 2009	~2 years, 288 days
-	Mary A. Legere	Major General; Mary A. Legere	16 October 2009	5 March 2012	2 years, 141 days
-	Stephen G. Fogarty	Major General; Stephen G. Fogarty	5 March 2012	30 May 2014	2 years, 86 days
-	George J. Franz III	Major General; George J. Franz III	30 May 2014	27 June 2016	2 years, 28 days
-	Christopher S. Ballard	Major General; Christopher S. Ballard	27 June 2016	11 June 2018	1 year, 349 days
-	Gary W. Johnston	Major General; Gary W. Johnston	11 June 2018	16 July 2021	3 years, 35 days
-	Michele H. Bredenkamp	Major General; Michele H. Bredenkamp	16 July 2021	14 December 2023	2 years, 151 days
-	Timothy D. Brown	Major General; Timothy D. Brown	14 December 2023	5 June 2026	2 years, 173 days
-	Rhett R. Cox	Major General; Rhett R. Cox	5 June 2026		149 days
