= Hawaii Cryptologic Center =

U.S. National Security Agency

Coordinates: 21.523°N 158.012°W

- Wahiawa, Oahu, Hawaii in USA

Site information
- Code: HCC

Location
- Location within Hawaii

Site history
- Built: January 6, 2012

The Hawaii Cryptologic Center (HCC) or NSA Hawaii is a U.S. National Security Agency (NSA) Central Security Service (CSS) facility located near Wahiawa on the island of Oahu, Hawaii. The facility opened on January 6, 2012, at a cost of $358 million. The center focuses on signals intelligence intercepts from Asia, and conducts cybersecurity and cyberwarfare operations.

In May 2013, a worker at this facility, Edward Snowden, took many classified documents and provided them to the press, revealing the existence of a number of top secret NSA mass surveillance programs.

== See also ==
- Kunia Regional SIGINT Operations Center
- European Cryptologic Center
- Colorado Cryptologic Center
- Georgia Cryptologic Center
- Texas Cryptologic Center
- Navy Information Operations Command, Hawaii
