= Cyber Quest =

Cyber Quest is an annual U.S. Army event held at Fort Gordon in which participants assess new technologies against documented Cyberspace, Electronic Warfare (EW), and Signal operational requirements. Cyber Quest is sponsored by the Cyber Battle Laboratory (CBL) of the Cyber Center of Excellence (CCOE)

Military planners use the event results to analyze current capability development, doctrine writing efforts, and DOTMLPF.

== Experimentation focus ==
1. Repeatable/Annual Event

2. Led by the Cyber Center of Excellence (CCoE), but with support from the larger Community of Interest (CoI)

a. Operational force, Institutional, Industry, and Academia

3. Prototyping Experiment with Operational Construct/Wrapper

a. Assess emerging technologies against documented (CARR approved) Cyber/EW capability requirements
b. Inform current capability development & doctrine, as well as understand DOTMLPF impacts.
c. Enables early risk mitigation for Army acquisition and capability development of candidate solutions before participating in larger Army/Joint exercises and experiments (i.e. AWA, AEWE, JUICE, and NIE)
d. Focused at BDE TOC (IBCT)
e. Use of Live, Constructed, and Virtual Environments to simulate and stimulate
f. Use of national and local Cyber Ranges

4. Use of an Experimentation Force (EXFOR) for operational context

5. No Fear of Failure (Sandbox) to encourage innovation and cross vendor-collaboration

== Cyber Quest benefits ==
1. True Operational requirements

a. Requirements articulated by TRADOC Capability Manager (TCM) and then (GOSC) CARR OPT approved
b. These are the top critical challenges facing the force - Not a science experiment

2. No fear of failure – encourage innovation

a. Not expected to be ready for prime time
b. Determine art-of-the-possible
c. Time and ability to mature solutions

3. Flexibility to achieve collaboration

a. Acquisition/requirements/PM community collaboration with vendors

4. Operationally Focused Event

a. Operational needs experimented within an operational environment - not a simple demo in a hotel conference room
b. Visibility to Command and Control (C2) systems and capabilities necessary to implement/integrate solutions
c. Ability to refine TTPs/CONOPS against an operational "like" environment with near-peer threat
d. Acquisition/requirement community efficiency and cost savings

== 2016 focus areas ==
1. Integration of Cyber and Electronic Warfare Situational Awareness (SA) capabilities

a. Identify mature vendor solutions that demonstrate a capability to converge Cyber and EW User Defined Operational Pictures (UDOPs) to provide commanders a holistic view of the CEM environment
b. Explore the concept of using tactical radios as sensors to provide input to the CEM SA tools
c. Understand DOTMLPF implications of using a CEM SA tools
d. Inform Tactics, Techniques, and Procedures of the CEMA cell

2. Demonstrate tactical radios as Electronic Warfare solutions;

a. Tactical handheld radios that can operate from 200 – 2500 MHz
b. Tactical radios that have anti-jamming capabilities
c. Tactical radios that automatically discover and operate in unused portions of the electromagnetic spectrum
d. Tactical radios capable of directing antenna energy to avoid jamming
e. Tactical radios capable of (near) silent operation
