= Texas Cryptologic Center =

Coordinates: 29°27′N 98°38.5′W

- NSA Texas
- Country: United States
- Allegiance: United States
- Branch: signals intelligence cyberspace operations, and cybersecurity operations
- Size: Classified
- Part of: National Security Agency
- Garrison/HQ: San Antonio
- Website: https://www.nsa.gov/About/Locations/

Commanders
- Current commander: Col. Stacy Kihara

The NSA/CSS Texas Cryptologic Center (TCC), also known as the Texas Cryptology Center, Texas Cryptographic Center or NSA Texas, is a satellite campus at the Medina Annex, Lackland Air Force Base, San Antonio, Texas, operated by the U.S. National Security Agency (NSA). It is adjacent to the former Medina National Stockpile Site. TCC conducts signals intelligence, cyberwarfare operations and cybersecurity operations.

== History ==
The TCC site was formerly known as the Medina Regional Security Operations Center (RSOC), which includes the Regional Technical Control and Analysis Element (TCAE). The Medina RSOC was known to house 2200 Army, Marine Corps, Navy, Air Force and civilian Department of Defense employees, including two squadrons of the 70th Intelligence Wing—the 543rd Support Squadron and the 93rd Intelligence Squadron.

== Expansion ==
In 2005, the NSA leased a nearby defunct chip plant from Sony at Loop 410 and Military Drive and announced plans to more than double the number of employees over the next two to three years. Originally totaling 470,000 square feet and consisting of two connected buildings, it is now about 633,000 sq. ft after expansions to the site was made. The NSA has completed the construction of a new 94,000 square feet Data Storage Complex on the old Sony plant grounds as of June 2010, but the current employee count remains classified.

From this satellite building, issues arose when houses near the building had their garage doors opening randomly. In 2010, the NSA issued a statement that an antenna it was using "interfered" with garage door openers.

== See also ==
- Colorado Cryptologic Center
- European Cryptologic Center
- Georgia Cryptologic Center
- Hawaii Cryptologic Center
- Utah Data Center
