= 706th Military Intelligence Group =

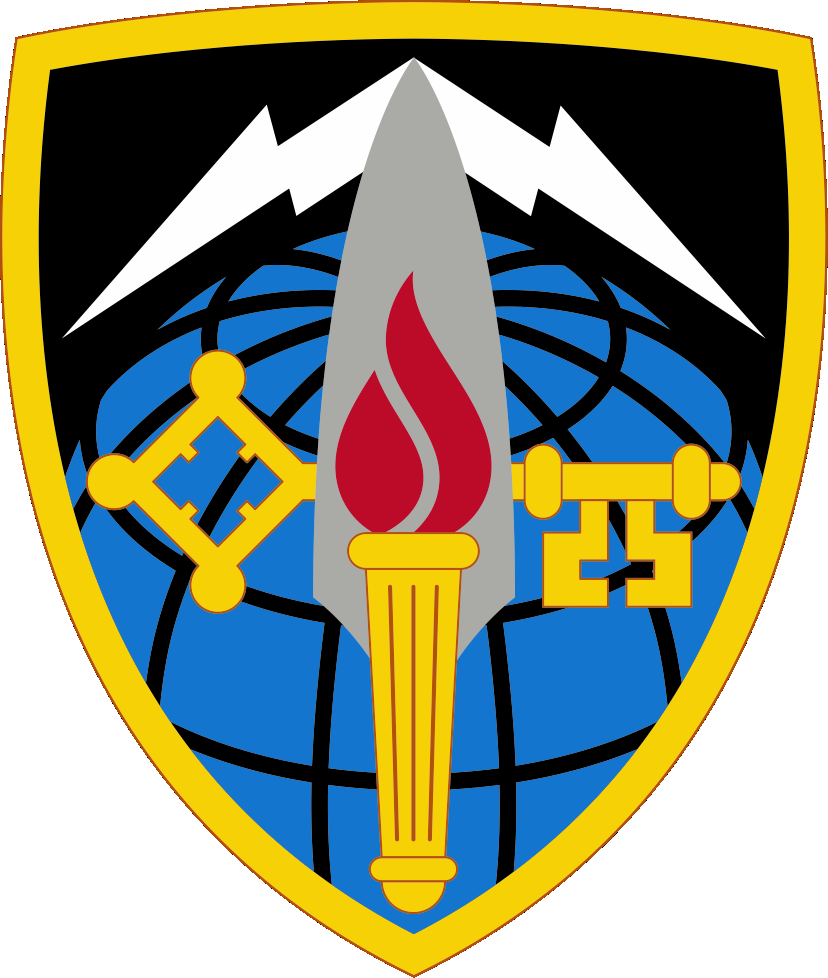
- Active: 1946-present
- Country: United States
- Allegiance: United States Army Intelligence and Security Command
- Branch: United States Army
- Role: Military Intelligence
- Size: Group (Brigade)
- Part of: National Security Agency
- Garrison/HQ: Fort Gordon, Georgia
- Motto: Victory Through Knowledge
- Website: https://www.usainscom.army.mil/706MIG/

Insignia
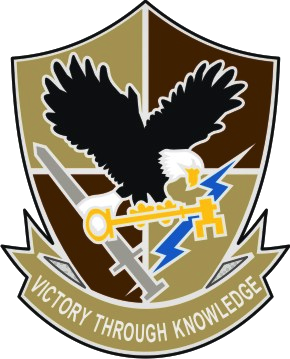
- 706th Military Intelligence Group DUI

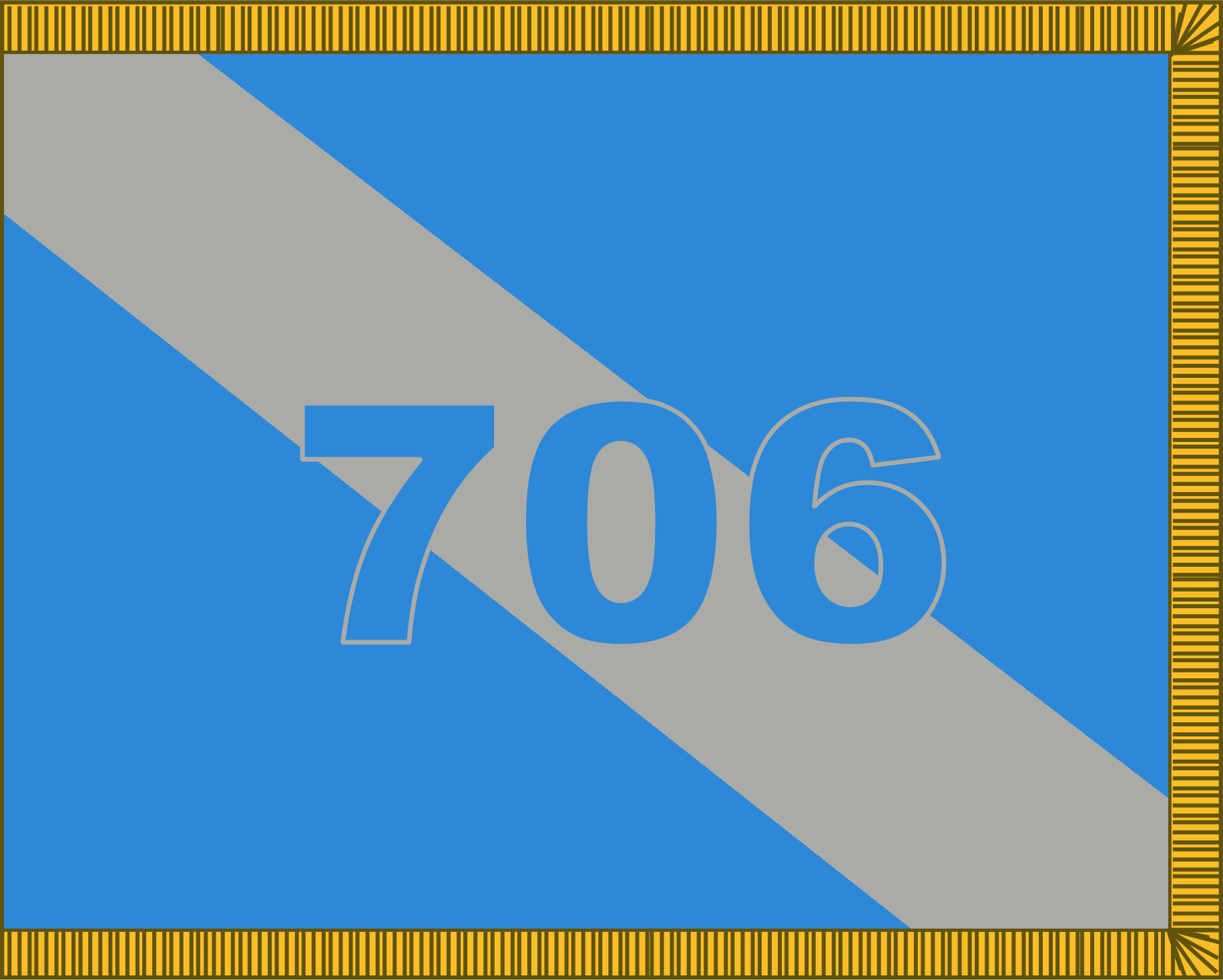
- 706th Military Intelligence Group Flag

The 706th Military Intelligence Group is a unit of the US Army stationed at Fort Gordon, Georgia. The unit shares a lineage with the 116th Military Intelligence Group but not that unit's colors or insignia. The unit was first created in 1946 as the 116th Counter Intelligence Corps Detachment in Washington, D.C. In 1951 it was assigned to the Regular Army and was redesignated several times until 1961 when it became the 116th Military Intelligence Group.

In 2000, the unit was moved to Fort Gordon, Georgia and deactivated in September 2009. The unit was redesignated as the 706th MI Group in 2010, but with new colors and insignia. And the 116th MI Group was reactivated as the 116th MI Brigade in 2015.

== Subordinate Units ==
- Headquarters & Headquarters Company
- 707th Military Intelligence Battalion
