= Camp Crockett =

1960s U.S. Army training site

Coordinates: 33.3732°N 82.2371°W

- Southwest of Augusta, Georgia

Site information
- Owner: United States Federal Government
- Controlled by: United States Army

Site history
- In use: 1967–1969

Garrison information
- Garrison: Fort Gordon

Camp Crockett was established in late 1967 on the Fort Gordon, Georgia, federal reservation for the training of soldiers preparatory to Airborne and Special Forces schools during the Vietnam War.

Located on an isolated part of the installation, the camp included a mockup of a village set up to look like one that would be encountered in Vietnam. Soldiers training at the camp were housed in Quonset huts, one of which served as a field kitchen.

Abandoned in 1969, the locations of the Quonset huts are marked by concrete slabs in a pine forest planted as part of a reforestation project instituted in 1970.

In 2010, news reports indicated that Agent Orange herbicide was applied by helicopter to 98 acres of Training Area 47 in July 1967 prior to the establishment of Camp Crockett.

== See also ==
- Remembering Camp Crockett (Blog)
- A Camp Within A Fort: Camp Crocket, Georgia (Blog)
