= 116th Military Intelligence Brigade =

116th Military Intelligence Brigade (Aerial Intelligence)
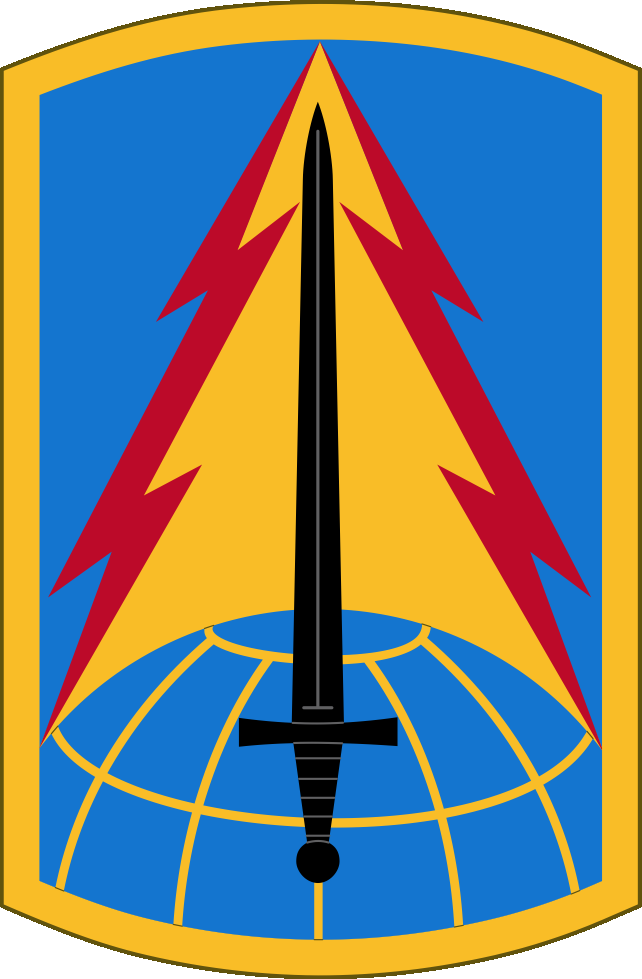
- 116th MI Bde shoulder sleeve insignia
- Active: 15 October 2015 -- present
- Country: United States
- Branch: United States Army
- Type: Military Intelligence
- Role: Aerial-Intelligence, Surveillance, and Reconnaissance
- Part of: US Army Intelligence and Security Command (INSCOM)
- Installation: Fort Hood, Texas
- Motto: "VIGIL PROMPTUSQUE"

Commanders
- Current commander: COL Matthew McGraw

Insignia
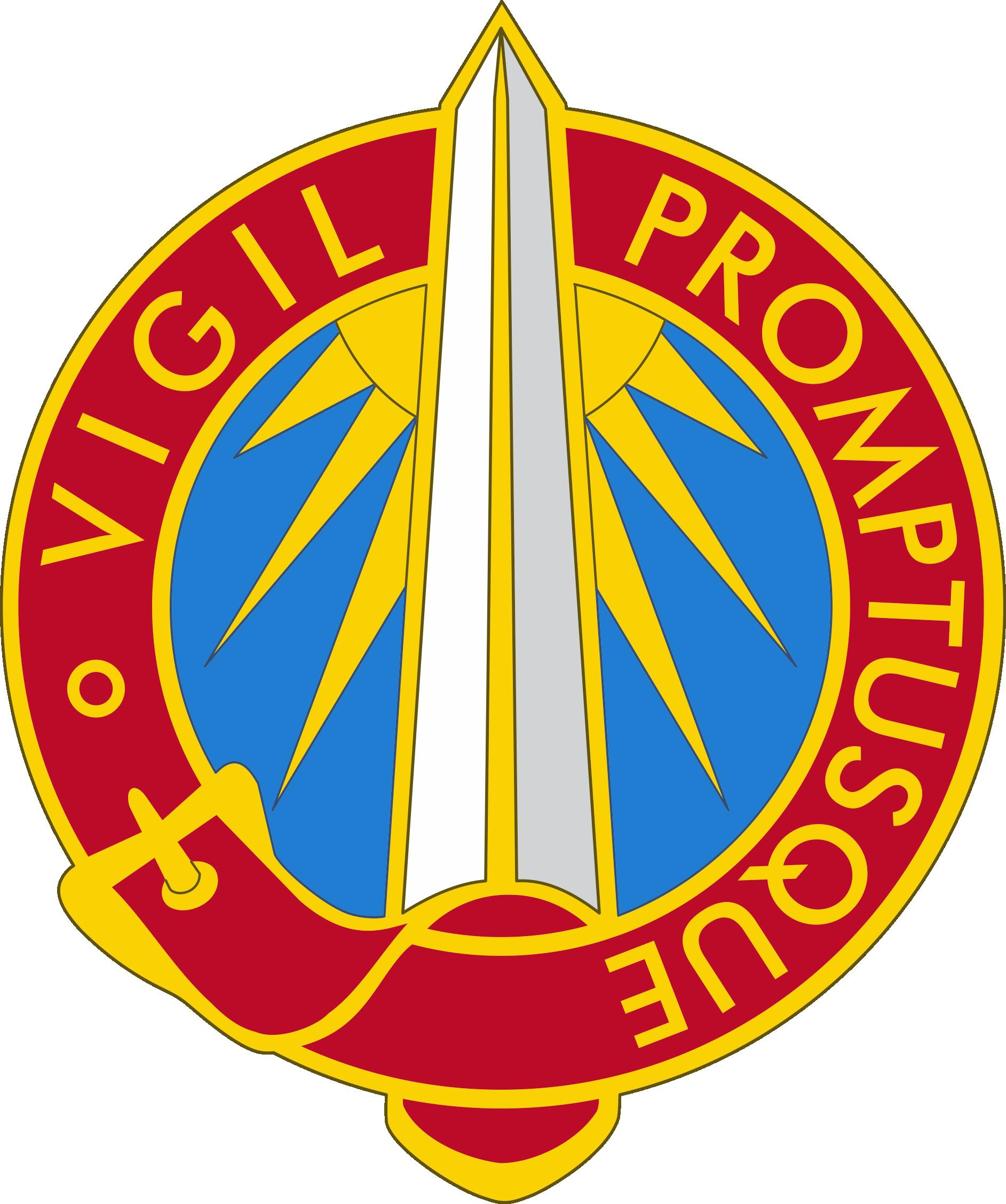
- 116th Military Intelligence Brigade DUI

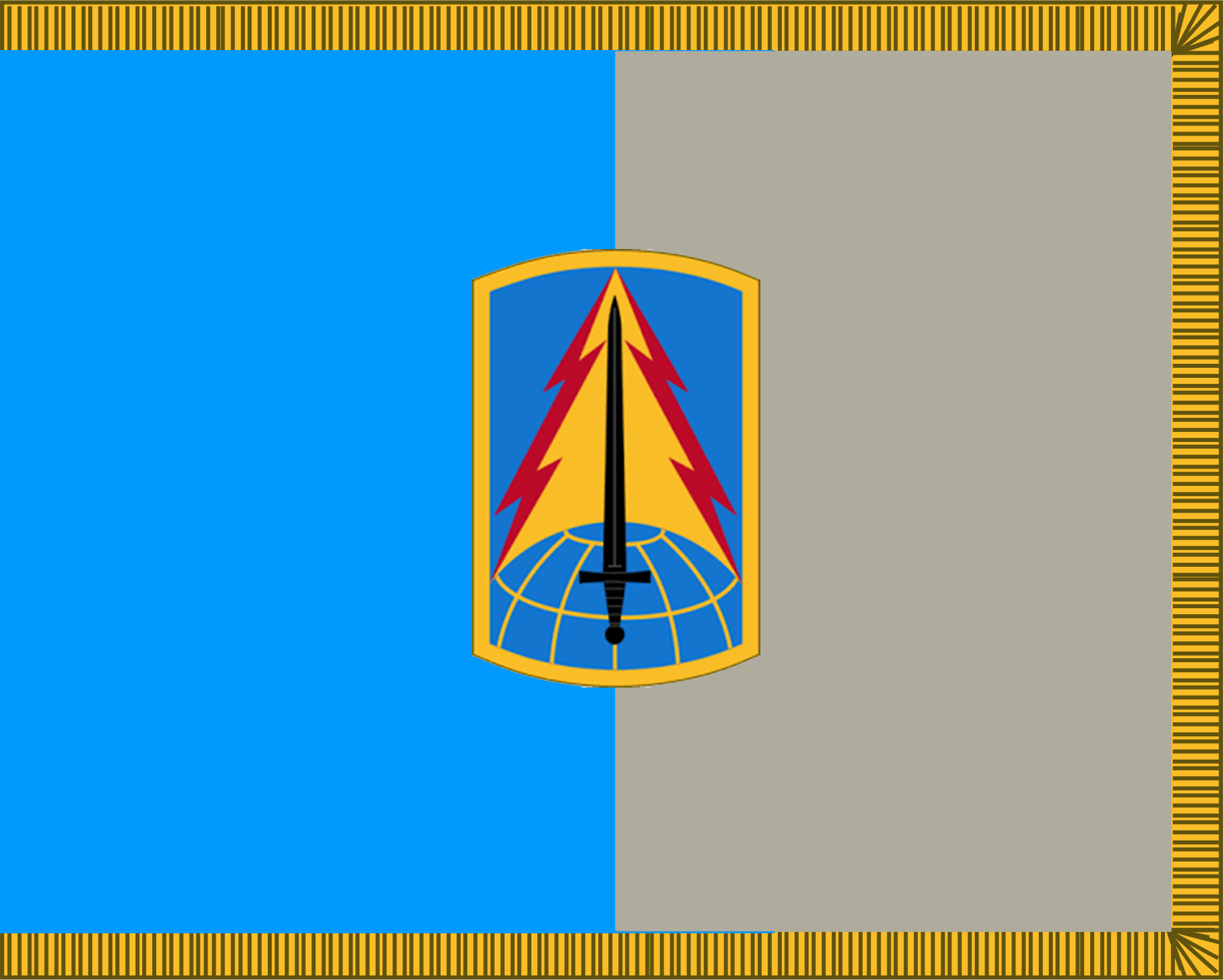
- 116th Military Intelligence Brigade Flag

The 116th Military Intelligence Brigade (Aerial Intelligence) (116th MIB) is an intelligence brigade in the U.S. Army charged with conducting 24/7 tasking, collection, processing, exploitation, dissemination and feedback operations of multiple organic and joint Aerial-Intelligence, Surveillance, and Reconnaissance (A-ISR) missions collected in overseas contingency areas of operation.

== History ==
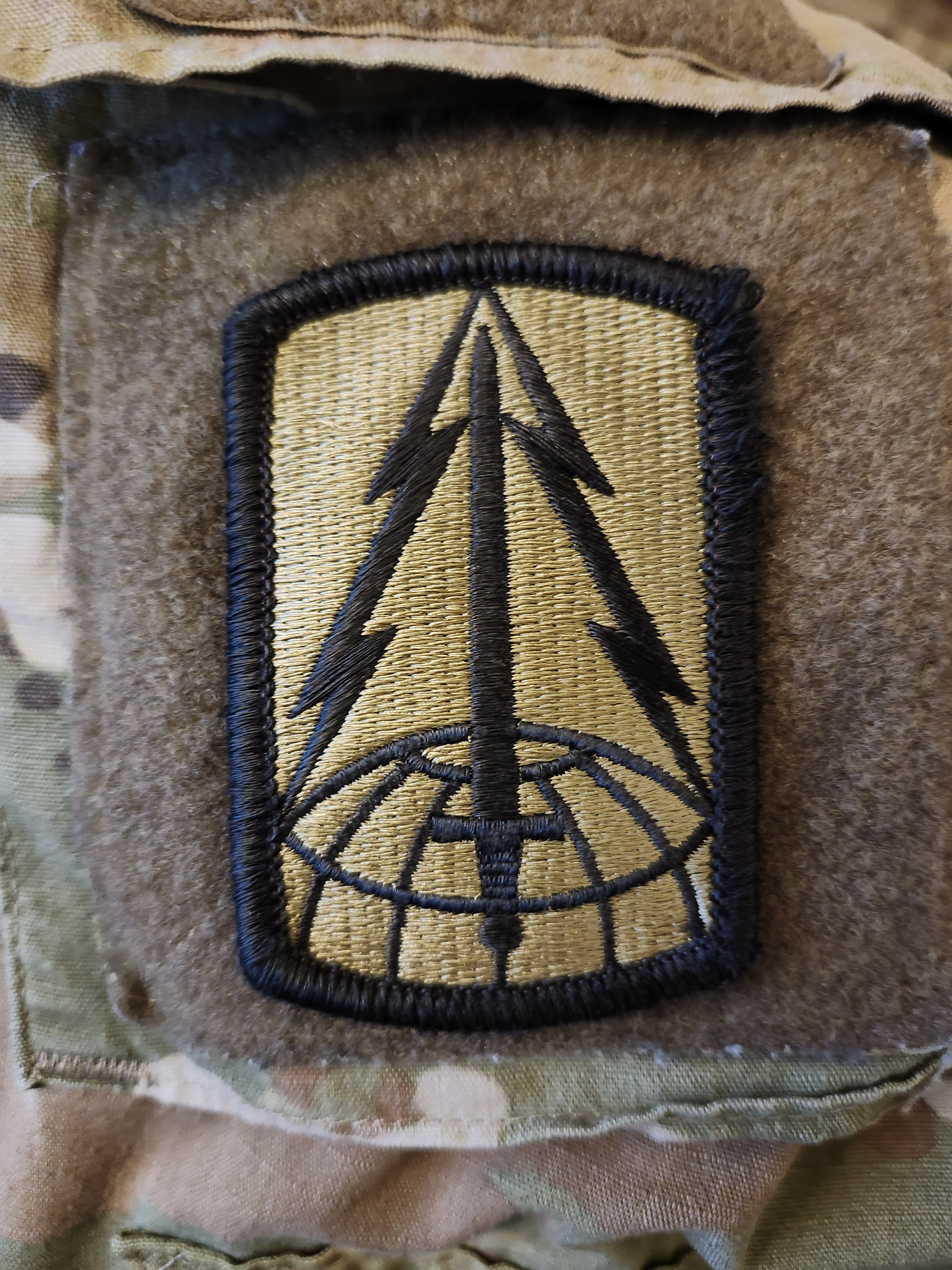
Shoulder sleeve insignia of the 116th Military Intelligence Brigade on a soldier's OCP uniform

The 116th MI Brigade was constituted 10 May 1946, as the 116th Counterintelligence Corps Detachment. It was activated 31 May 1946, in Washington, DC. The unit was allotted to the regular army on 5 March 1951. In 1959, it was redesignated as the 116th Counterintelligence Corps Group, redesignated as the 116th Intelligence Corps Group in 1961, and then redesignated as the 116th Military Intelligence Group in October 1966. On 9 January 1973, the unit was deactivated in Washington, DC. It was later redesignated in February 1999, as Headquarters and Headquarters Detachment, 116th Military Intelligence Group and activated 16 June 2000, at Fort Gordon, Georgia. The 116th was deactivated again 30 Sept. 2009.

In August 2014, the designation Headquarters and Headquarters Company, 116th Military Intelligence Brigade was reserved for activation 15 Oct. 2015. The US Army approved the establishment of an aerial intelligence brigade and designated the 116th to fulfill the mission. According to the US Army, the 116th MI Brigade will continue to grow in the coming years.

== Units ==
- Headquarters and Headquarters Company
- Distributed Common Ground System-Army Operations and Exploitation Unit
- 15th Military Intelligence Battalion (Aerial Exploitation), Fort Hood (previously aligned under the 500th Military Intelligence Brigade)
- 204th Military Intelligence Battalion (Aerial Exploitation), Fort Bliss
  - Company D (RO-6A)
- 206th Military Intelligence Battalion (Aerial Exploitation), Fort Hood
- 224th Military Intelligence Battalion (Aerial Exploitation), Hunter Army Airfield (previously aligned under the 513th Military Intelligence Brigade)
- United States Army Intelligence & Security Command (INSCOM) Processing, Exploitation, and Dissemination (PED) Battalion, Fort Gordon
