= Fort Gordon =

U.S. Army installation in Georgia

Coordinates: 33°24′48″N 82°8′7″W

- Augusta, Georgia
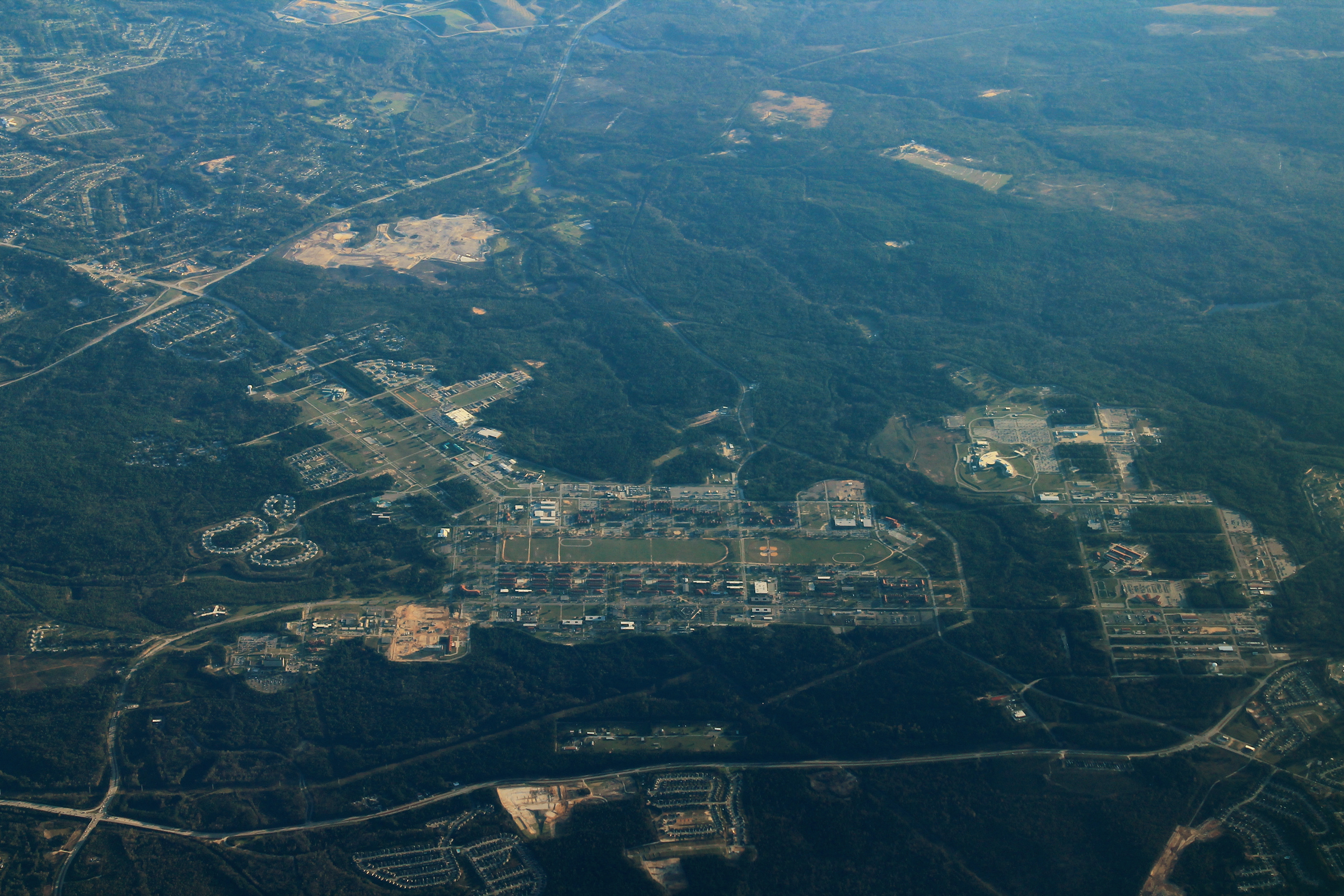
- An aerial image of Fort Gordon

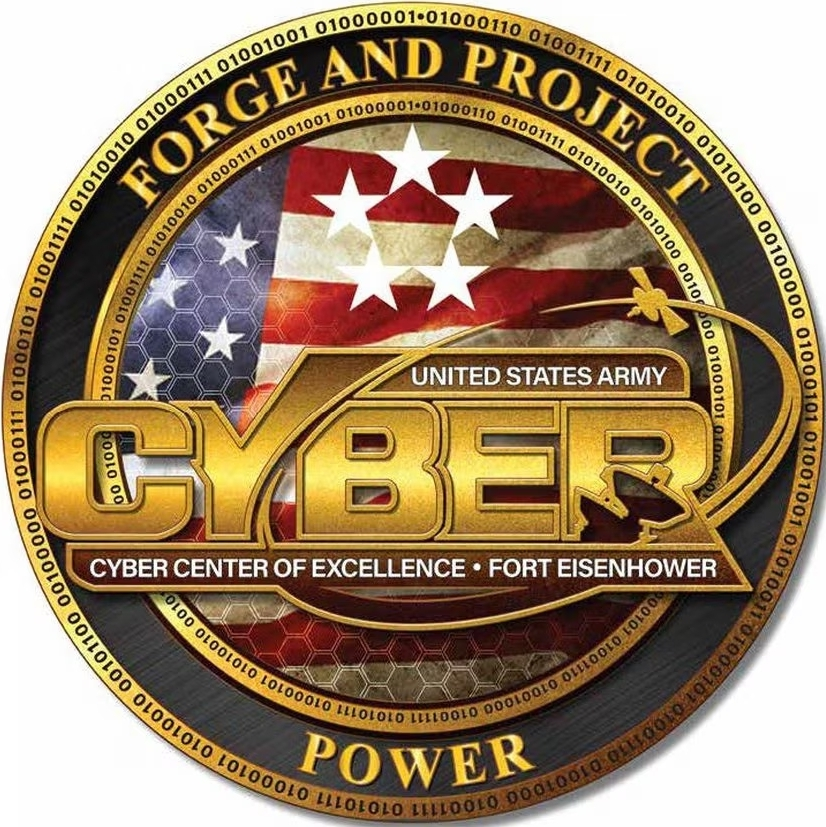

Site information
- Owner: United States federal government
- Controlled by: United States Army
- Status: Active
- Website: home.army.mil/gordon/

Location
- Area: 86.87 square miles (225.0 km^{2})

Site history
- Built: 1941
- In use: October 1941–present

Garrison information
- Garrison: U.S. Army Garrison Fort Gordon
- Occupants: US Army Cyber Center of Excellence; US Army Signal School; US Army Cyber School; 15^{th} Signal Brigade; 35^{th} Signal Brigade; 116^{th} Military Intelligence Brigade; 513^{th} Military Intelligence Brigade; 480^{th} Intelligence, Surveillance and Reconnaissance Wing; 706^{th} Military Intelligence Group; Dwight D. Eisenhower Army Medical Center; Navy Information Operations Command, Georgia

Fort Gordon, formerly known as Fort Eisenhower and Camp Gordon, is a United States Army installation established southwest of Augusta, Georgia, in October 1941. Originally named after Confederate Army General John Brown Gordon, it is now named in honor of Medal of Honor recipient Gary Gordon, it is the home of the United States Army Signal Corps, United States Army Cyber Command, and the Cyber Center of Excellence as well as the National Security Agency/Central Security Service' Georgia Cryptologic Center (NSA Georgia or NSAG).

It was once the home of the Provost Marshal General School and Civil Affairs School. Fort Gordon is one of the largest US Army installations in the world with more than 16,000 military service members and 13,500 civilian personnel assigned to it.

One of the major components of the installation is Advanced Individual Training for Signal Corps military occupational specialties. Signals Intelligence has become more visible and comprises more and more of the post's duties.

== Background ==
When established in later 1941, the installation was originally named after John Brown Gordon. While he was a major general in the Confederate army during the Civil War, after the war he held state and national offices: he was elected twice as a United States Senator (D-GA) and between these terms in the late 19th century served as Governor of Georgia. It was one of several U.S. Army installations named for prominent Confederate officers.

In the early 21st century, the Department of Defense Naming Commission recommended it be renamed as Fort Eisenhower, for President Dwight D. Eisenhower, who had also served as Commanding General of the Allied Forces during World War II. On 5 January 2023 William A. LaPlante, Under Secretary of Defense for Acquisition and Sustainment directed the full implementation of the recommendations of the Naming Commission. The redesignation occurred 27 October 2023. (Note: Redesignation to Fort Eisenhower was on 27 October 2023.)

A different Camp Gordon existed in Chamblee, Georgia, near Atlanta during World War I. During World War I, the US Army Camp Hancock was located in Augusta, Georgia, in the general vicinity of the current Daniel Field. Camp Hancock was the home of the 28th Infantry Division from Pennsylvania. Camp Hancock was abandoned and turned over to a caretaker detachment on 27 March 1919.

From 1919 until 1941, there was no army installation named Camp Gordon in existence, nor was there any installation located near Augusta, Georgia.

== History ==
=== World War II era ===
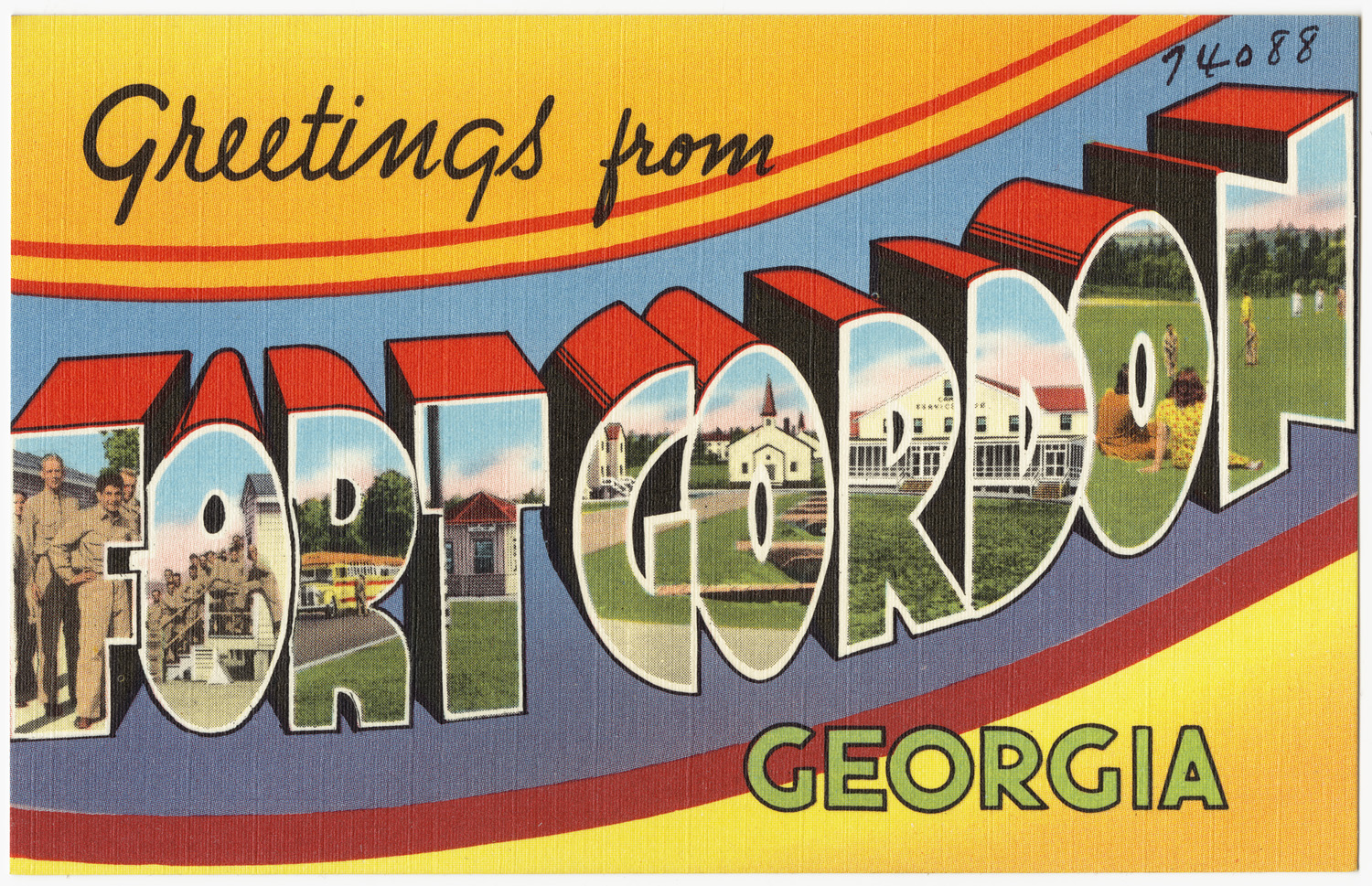
"Greetings from Fort Gordon, Georgia," Curt Teich large-letter postcard, 1943

Camp Gordon was approved as the name for a WWII division training camp, which began construction in July 1941. The U.S. War Department approved a contract to construct facilities on a new training area near Augusta, in Richmond County, Georgia, which had been selected several months earlier. A groundbreaking and flag-raising ceremony took place in October. In response to the attack on Pearl Harbor, Colonel Herbert W. Schmidt, camp commander, moved his small staff from his temporary office in the Augusta post office building to the unfinished headquarters building at Camp Gordon on 9 December 1941. The 4th Infantry Division began to establish operations there.

The post was home to three divisions during the war: the 4th Infantry, the 26th Infantry, and the 10th Armored. From October 1943 to January 1945, Camp Gordon served as an internment camp for foreign prisoners of war. From May 1945 until April 1946, the U.S. Army Personnel and Separation Center processed nearly 86,000 personnel for discharge from the Army.

On the base there is a German and Italian POW cemetery containing the remains of 22 World War II era POWs. The cemetery is actually two separate cemeteries with the German POWs interred in one and the Italian POW interred in the other; however, because of a major accountability effort by the US Army in recent years and their close proximity to each other, they are often classified as one. The Italian and German POW's interred in the grounds died from either accidental or natural causes while housed as prisoners at what was originally called Camp Gordon.

=== Post-World War II ===
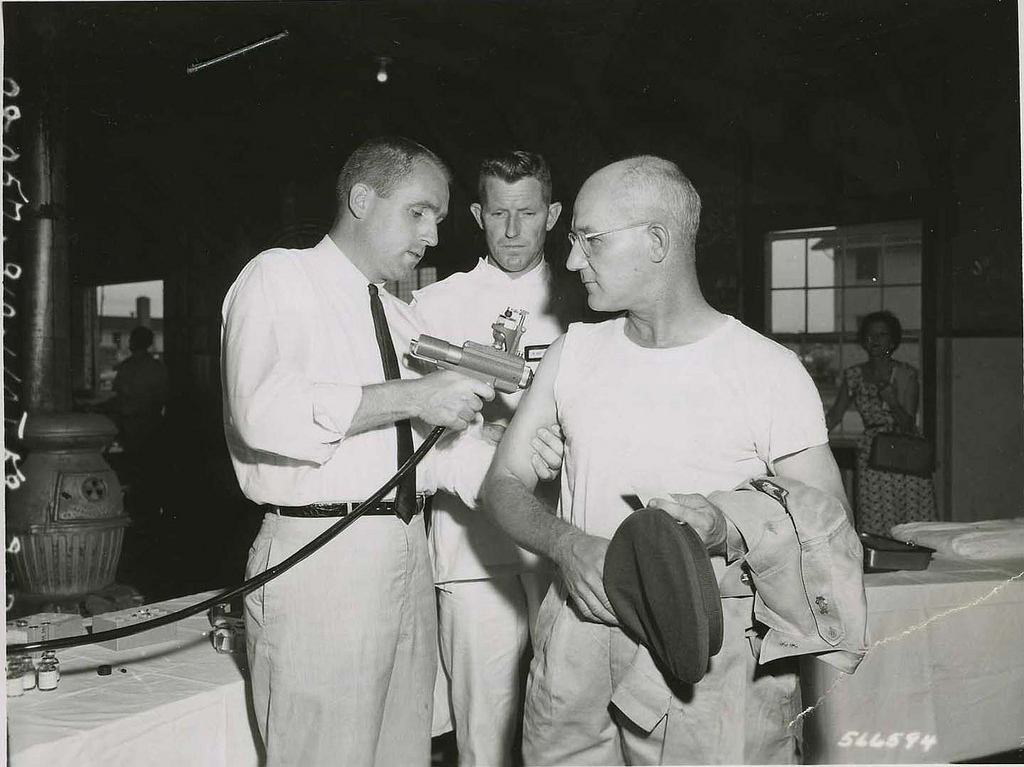
SP5 Lawrence E. Blackman (Darlington, SC) Hq & Hq Co, USASTC, receives the first typhus shot administered by a jet injector at Fort Gordon by John R. Gordon, representative of the R.P. Scherer Corp. of Detroit, August 1959.

From early 1946 to June 1947, the U.S. Army Disciplinary Barracks for convicted criminals was located at Camp Gordon, and the installation was scheduled for deactivation. In September 1948 the Army relocated the Military Police School from Carlisle Barracks, Pennsylvania, to Camp Gordon. In October 1948 a Signal Corps training center was activated here.

On 21 March 1956, the post was renamed Fort Gordon.

During the 1950s and into the 1970s, Fort Gordon served as a basic training facility under the US Third Army.

During the Vietnam War, the post was home to Camp Crockett, an area of the post conducting 9-week advance airborne infantry training courses for soldiers in line to attend their remaining 3 weeks of Airborne training at Fort Benning, Georgia. These soldiers were headed for assignment to Airborne units in Vietnam. This location closed as the war ended; today the site is overgrown with pine trees.

Between 1966 and 1968, approximately 2,200 Signal Officers were trained at the post's Signal Officer Candidate School (OCS), before all US Army branch OCSs were merged with the Infantry OCS at Fort Benning. Until 1974 and the end of the Vietnam War, Fort Gordon was also a training location for the Military Police Corps. This was located in the World War II wooden barracks corridor between Brainard Avenue and Avenue of the States, and in the Brems Barracks area of the fort.

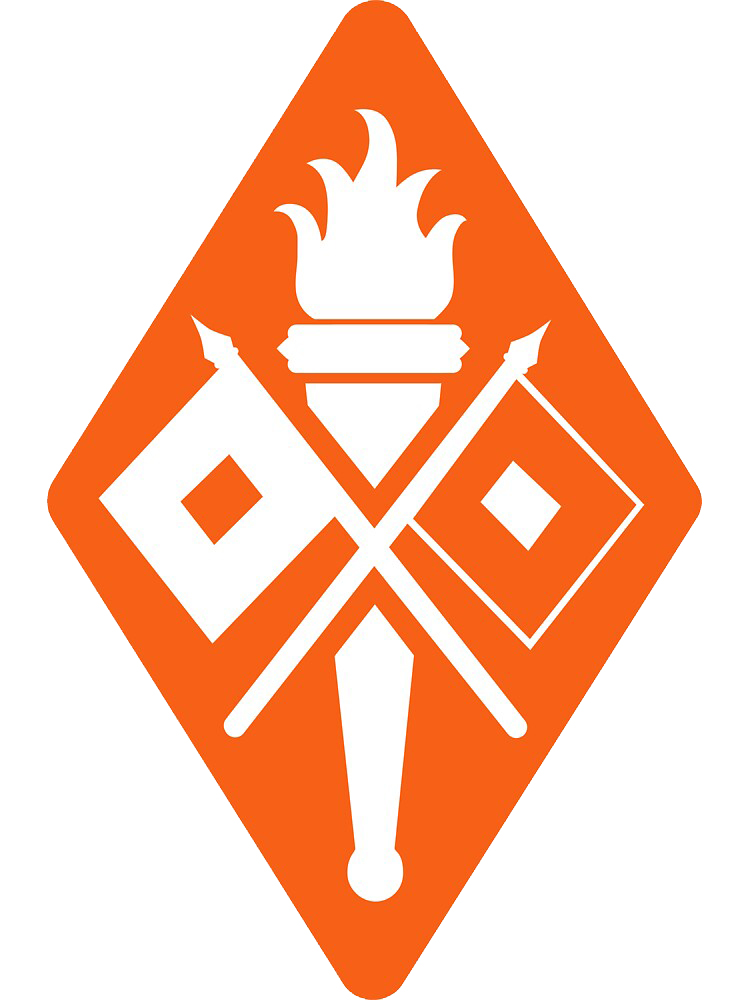
Signal Corps Center and School

In 1974, the Army moved its main Signal School from Fort Monmouth, New Jersey, to Fort Gordon to consolidate all signal training in one location. The activity was designated as the US Army Signal Center and Fort Gordon. At the same time, the Army moved the MP School to Fort McClellan, Alabama, and the Civil Affairs School to Fort Bragg, North Carolina.

Since June 1986 the post has been the home of the Signal Corps Regiment, the branch of the U.S. Army responsible for providing and maintaining information systems and communication networks. The US Army Signal School's primary purpose is to conduct specialized instruction for all Signal Corps military and civilian personnel. During the 1990s the post served as a home for deployable Signal and Military Intelligence units as well.

The other major activity was health care, to include a Dental Lab along with a major Army Hospital, Dwight D. Eisenhower Medical Center. Fort Gordon is a diversified post where army Signal, Military Intelligence, Medical, and now Cyber are housed. The senior mission partner remains the US Army Cyber Center of Excellence.

=== Eisenhower method ===
As Supreme Commander in World War II, General Dwight D. Eisenhower prioritized the Allies' actions by a maxim paraphrased — "The important things are seldom urgent; the urgent things are seldom important"; however some things can be both urgent and important (the Eisenhower box). One of Eisenhower's requirements was that a report to him fit on a single sheet of paper. This allowed Eisenhower to manage the workload. Eisenhower later popularized this maxim while serving as President of Columbia University.

The co-location of Cyber operations and the Cyber Center of Excellence has resulted in Fort Gordon shifting from a mission devoted to institutional training to becoming a 24/7 operational installation, (Note: This text incorporates material from the ARCYBER web page. 5 capabilities (o d a i i), pronounced o'day: As of (23 Sep 2023). Subject to change.: 1. Operate; NETCOM; 2. Defend; Cyber Protection Brigade; 91st Cyber Brigade; U.S. Army Reserve Cyber Protection Brigade; 3. Attack; Joint Force Headquarters-Cyber (JFHQ-C); 780th Military Intelligence Brigade (Cyber); 11th Cyber Battalion (formerly 915th Cyber Warfare Battalion); 4. Influence; 1st Information Operations Command (IOC); U.S. Army Civil Affairs & Psychological Operations Command; 151st Theater IO Group; 71st Theater IO Group; 56th Theater IO Group; 5. Inform: Cyber Military Intelligence Group (CMIG)) to Operate, Defend, Attack, Influence, and Inform (ODAY, pronounced "o'day").

=== Renaming ===
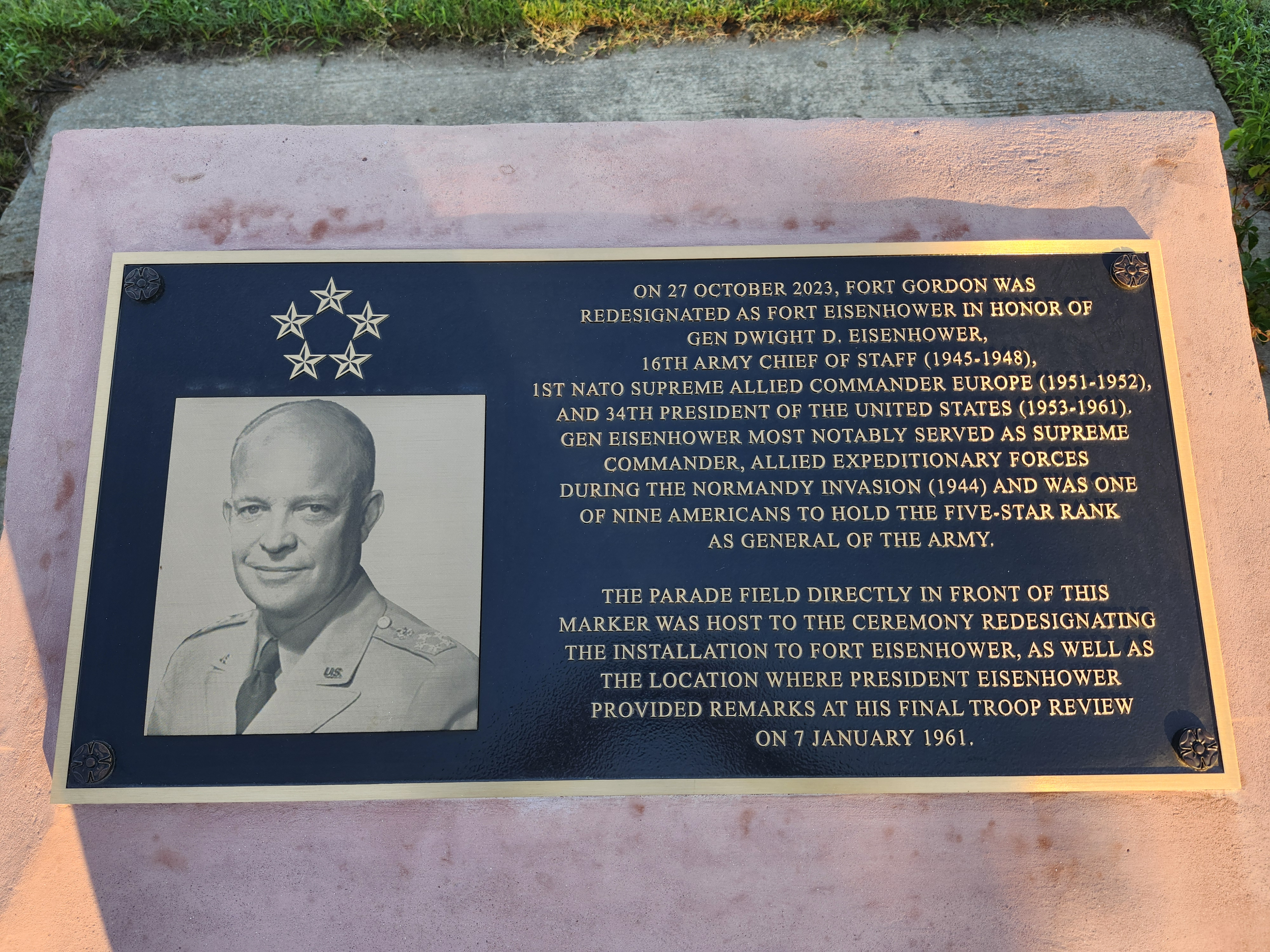
Plaque at Freedom Park, Fort Gordon detailing President Eisenhower's significance to the fort that used to bear his name

On 24 May 2022, the Commission on the Naming of Items of the Department of Defense that Commemorate the Confederate States of America or Any Person Who Served Voluntarily with the Confederate States of America submitted a recommendation to Congress that the post be renamed to Fort Eisenhower, in commemoration of General of the Army Dwight D. Eisenhower, the 34th President of the United States.

The Cyber Center of Excellence was redesignated Cyber Center of Excellence and Fort Eisenhower on 27 October 2023 at Barton Field, the same location at which President Eisenhower delivered his final troop review speech on 7 January 1961. Fort Eisenhower was the last US Army installation to be renamed. The redesignation was attended by Eisenhower's granddaughter Susan Eisenhower and Christine Wormuth, the 25th U.S. Secretary of the Army. The ceremony was presided over by Major General Paul T. Stanton, the then-commanding general of Fort Gordon.

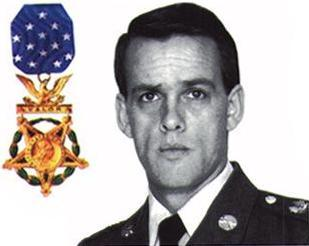
Master Sergeant Gary Gordon and the Medal of Honor

On June 11, 2025, it was announced that President Donald Trump would rename the base back to Fort Gordon, now named after Medal of Honor recipient Master Sergeant Gary Gordon. According to Maj. Gen. Ryan Janovic, commander of the Cyber Center of Excellence, the change was effective immediately, notably faster than other contemporaneous base renames.

== Consolidating operations and facilities ==
Due to increases in the need and use of cyber technology, the US Army decided to consolidate the United States Army Cyber Command into one location. Fort Gordon and Fort George Meade were considered to receive this command. In December 2013 it was announced that Fort Gordon was selected.

In September 2014, the US Army established the US Army Cyber branch and Cyber School at Fort Gordon. Both the Signal School and Cyber School are subordinate elements of the US Army Cyber Center of Excellence, the headquarters of which was formerly known as the US Army Signal Center of Excellence. The chiefs of the Signal and Cyber branches – the Chief of Signal and the Chief of Cyber – are dual hatted as the commandants of their respective schools and serve as the proponent chiefs for their branches and regiments.

In October 2016, the post marked its 75th year as a continuous active US military installation near Augusta, Georgia. In 2018, the Installation Management Command became part of the Army Material Command; the installation facilities now belong to AMC, with the TRADOC Cyber Center of Excellence commander serving as the senior mission partner in addition to his TRADOC duties of education and training.

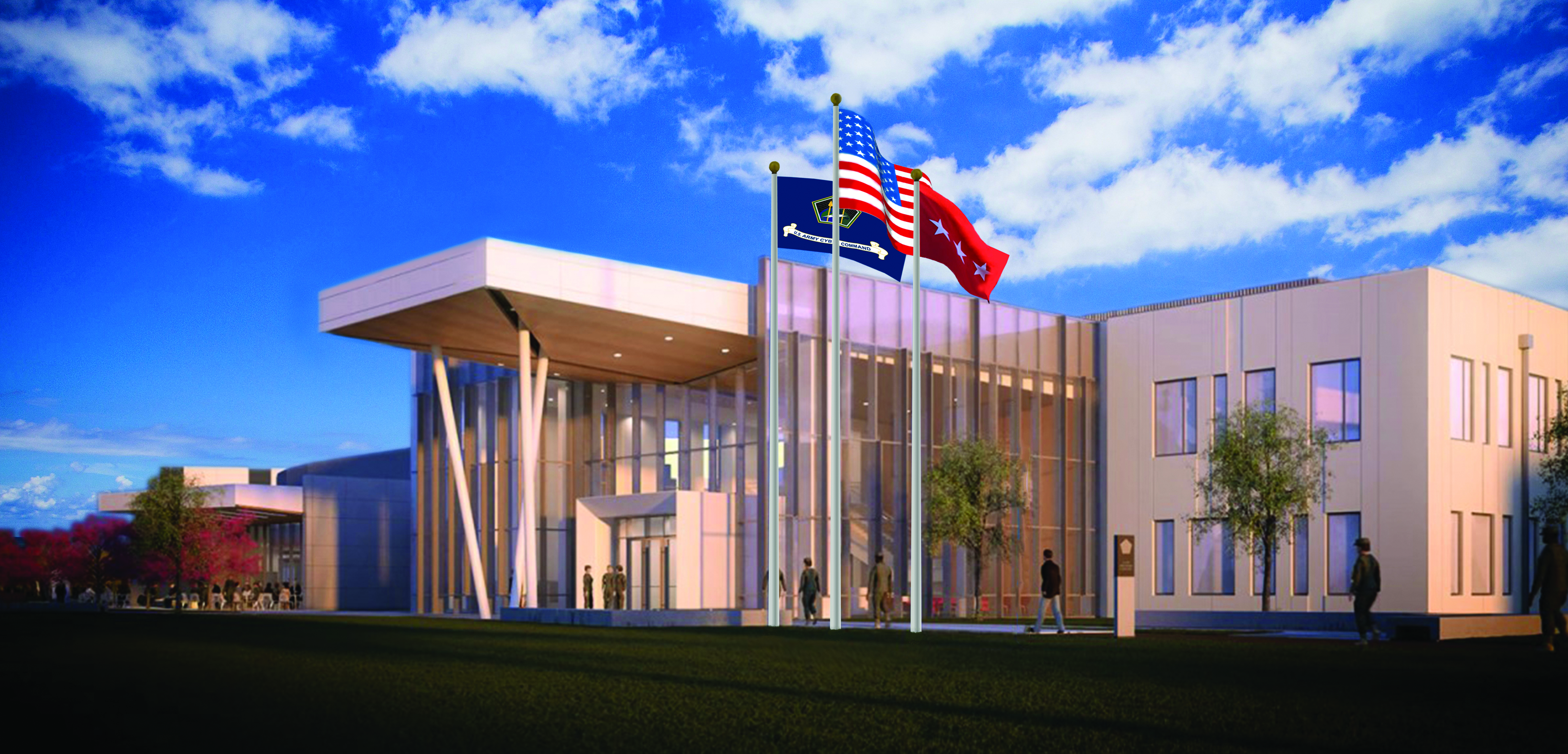
Fortitude Hall is the new headquarters of the US Army Cyber Command based at Fort Gordon.

Fort Gordon is home to the US Army Signal and Cyber Schools. In March 2020, Army Cyber Command (ARCYBER) relocated from Virginia to its new home in Fortitude Hall, co-located with the National Security Agency — Georgia headquarters. The co-location of the Army Cyber operational headquarters with its institutional Schoolhouse for Cyber Warriors, afforded unique opportunities to enrich institutional courses and training with operational experience and real-world lessons.

With the establishment of the Army Cyber Corps, and relocation of the Army Cyber command, Fort Gordon has shifted from a focus on institutional training to becoming a 24/7 operational installation, for the Cyber Military Intelligence Group (CMIG), the Information Warfare Operations Center (IWOC), and the Joint Mission Operations Center —Georgia (JMOC-G).

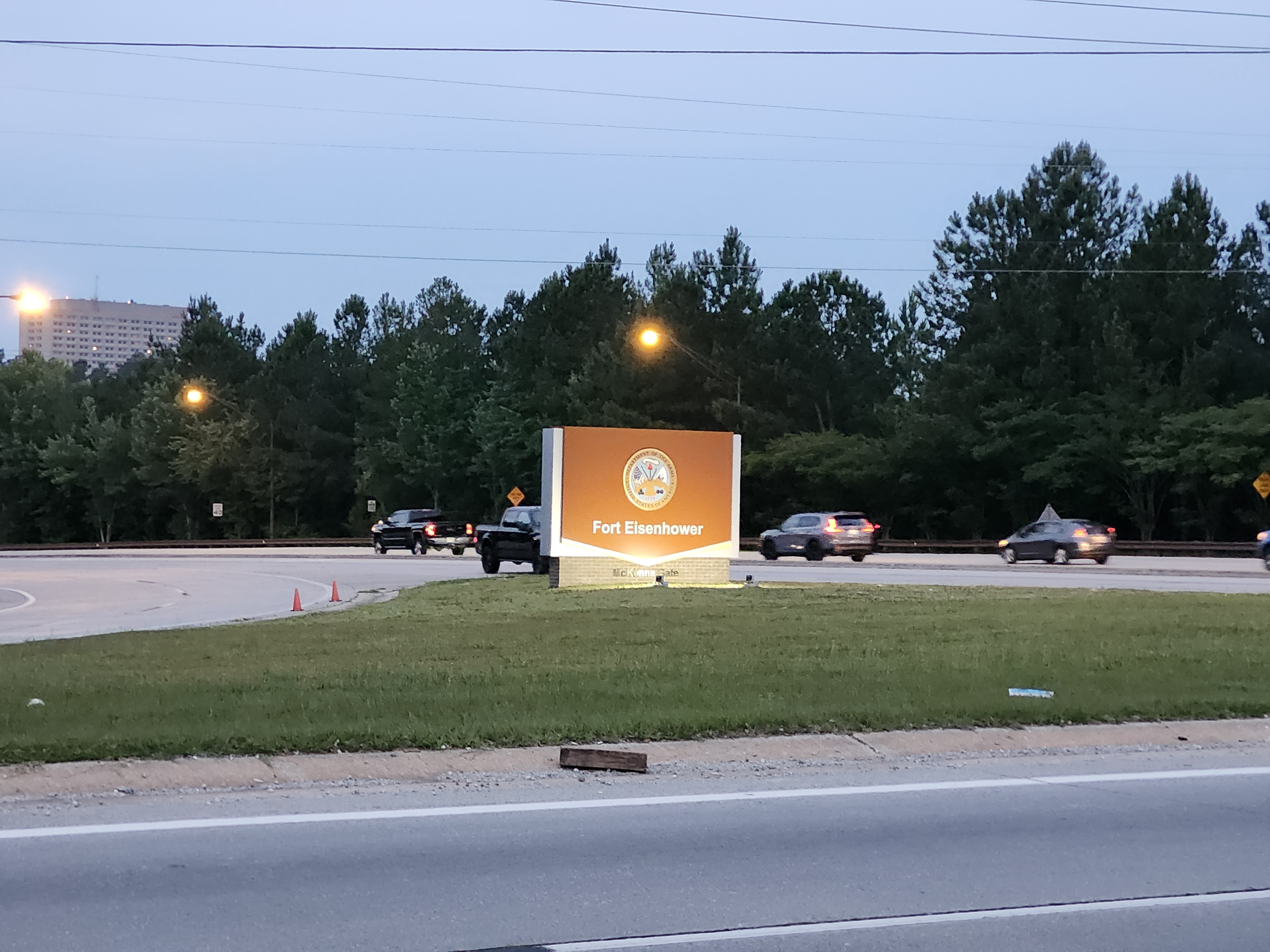
Fort Gordon sign at the McKenna Gate along Gordon Highway. Dwight D. Eisenhower Army Medical Center can be seen above the trees in the upper left.

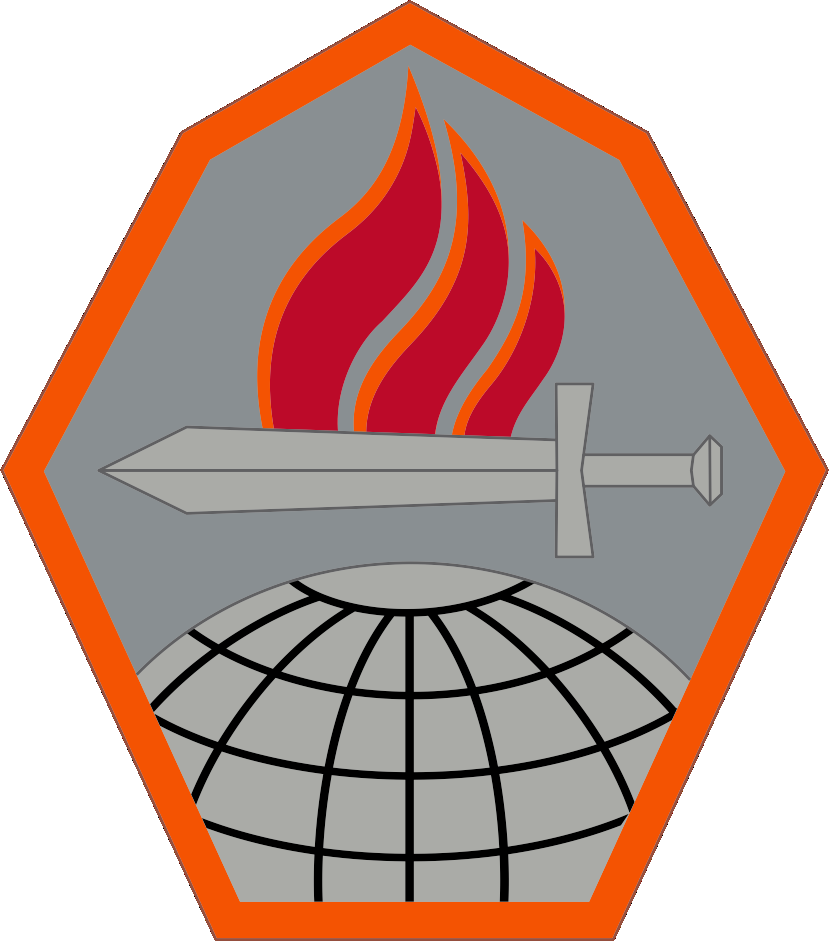
The Cyber Center of Excellence SSI

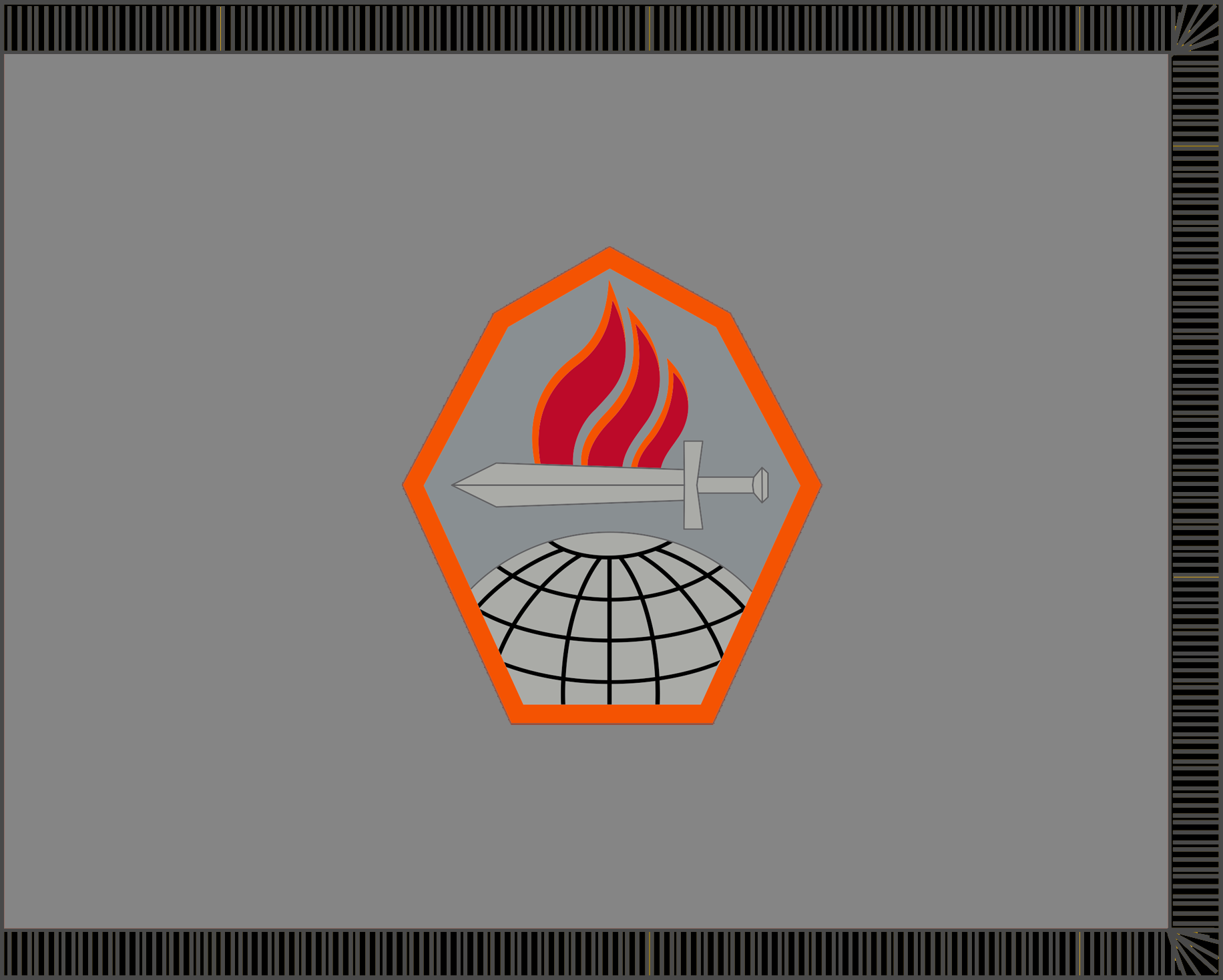
Cyber Center of Excellence Flag

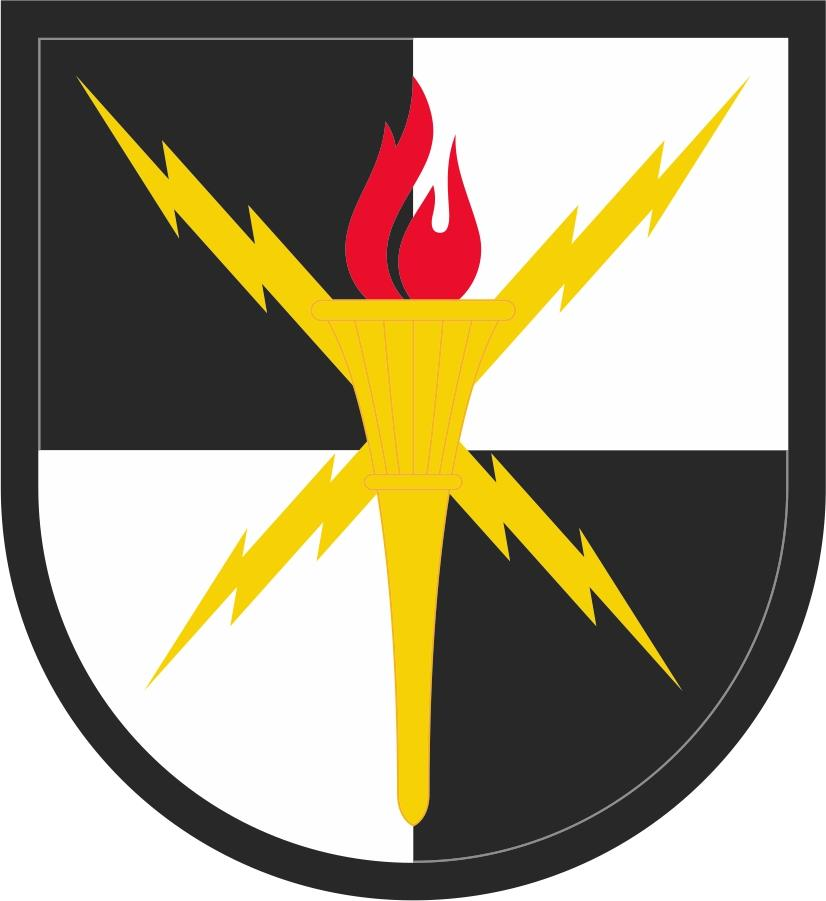
The US Army Cyber School

== Training and current operations ==
The Signal school focuses primarily on communications technology that is currently being utilized by the United States Army to provide the DODIN or Department of Defense Information Network, the platform for cyberspace operations. One MOS or Military Operational Specialty that is currently being trained at Fort Gordon by the Signal School is the Signal Support System Specialists, whose MOS designation is 25U or 25 Uniform. Soldiers who can perform both Signal and Cyber-related jobs are in high demand throughout the army, and because of this, Fort Gordon has a steady stream of soldiers training on base in those disciplines.

== Units and facilities ==
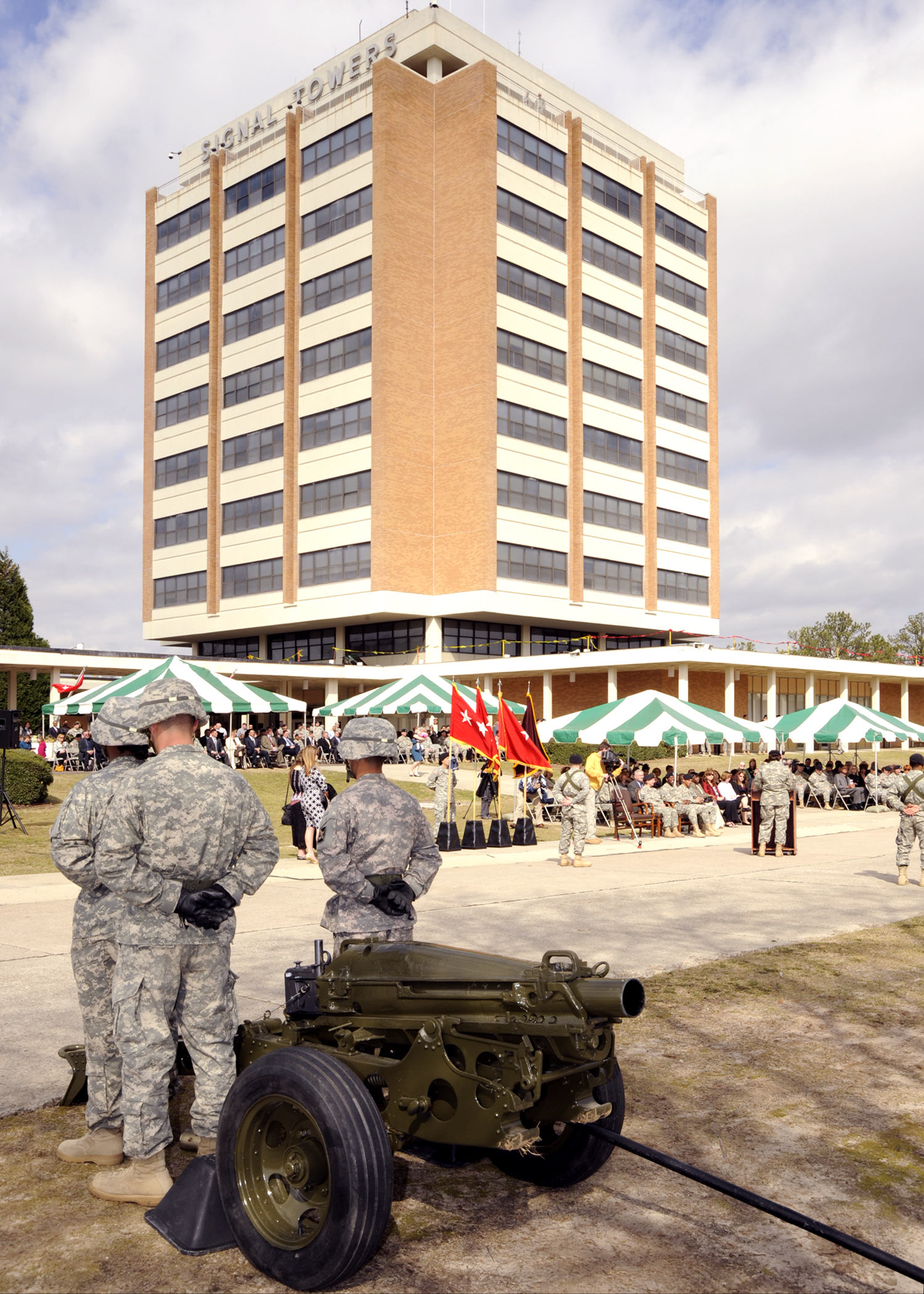
U.S. soldiers stand ready for a cannon salute during the 7th Signal Command activation and reception 6 March 2009, at Fort Gordon in front of the now-demolished Signal Towers.

Fort Gordon's official name is the U.S. Army Cyber Center of Excellence & Fort Gordon, or CyberCoE&FE. While the TRADOC school itself is a major function, the post is home to the following active-duty tenant units:

- United States Army Cyber Command (ARCYBER)
- Cyber Protection Brigade
- 780th Military Intelligence Brigade (located at Fort Meade, MD)
  - 782nd Military Intelligence Battalion
  - 11th Cyber Battalion
- 15th Signal Brigade
  - 369th Signal Battalion
  - 442nd Signal Battalion
  - 551st Signal Battalion
  - Ordnance Training Detachment – Gordon
  - 401st Cyber Battalion
- 35th Signal Brigade
  - 50th Expeditionary Signal Battalion (located at Fort Bragg, NC)
  - 51st Expeditionary Signal Battalion (located at Joint Base Lewis–McChord, WA)
  - 63rd Expeditionary Signal Battalion (located at Fort Stewart, GA)
- 116th Military Intelligence Brigade (United States)
- 480th Intelligence, Surveillance and Reconnaissance Group USAF
  - 3rd Intelligence Squadron
  - 31st Intelligence Squadron
  - 451st Intelligence Squadron
- 513th Military Intelligence Brigade
  - 202nd Military Intelligence Battalion
  - 297th Military Intelligence Battalion
- 35th Military Police Detachment
- 706th Military Intelligence Group
  - 707th Military Intelligence Battalion
- 7th Signal Command
- 359th Signal Brigade (USAR)
- 92nd Engineers Combat Heavy
- 206th Military Intelligence Battalion
- 324th Signal Battalion
- Cryptologic Support Battalion
- 338th Training Squadron (USAF)
- National Security Agency/Central Security Service Georgia, formerly known as the Gordon Regional Security Operations Center.
- Naval Network Warfare Command (Navy Information Operations Command, Georgia),
- Marine Corps Intelligence Activity
- Dwight D. Eisenhower Army Medical Center (DDEAMC)

Fort Gordon has approximately 30,000 military and civilian employees and currently has an estimated $1.1 billion economic impact on the Augusta-Richmond County economy.

== Berlin Wall display ==
In Freedom Park, located off Rice Road, across from Barton Field, is a display of two sections of the Berlin Wall that separated East and West Berlin during the Cold War, and a sign from the wall.

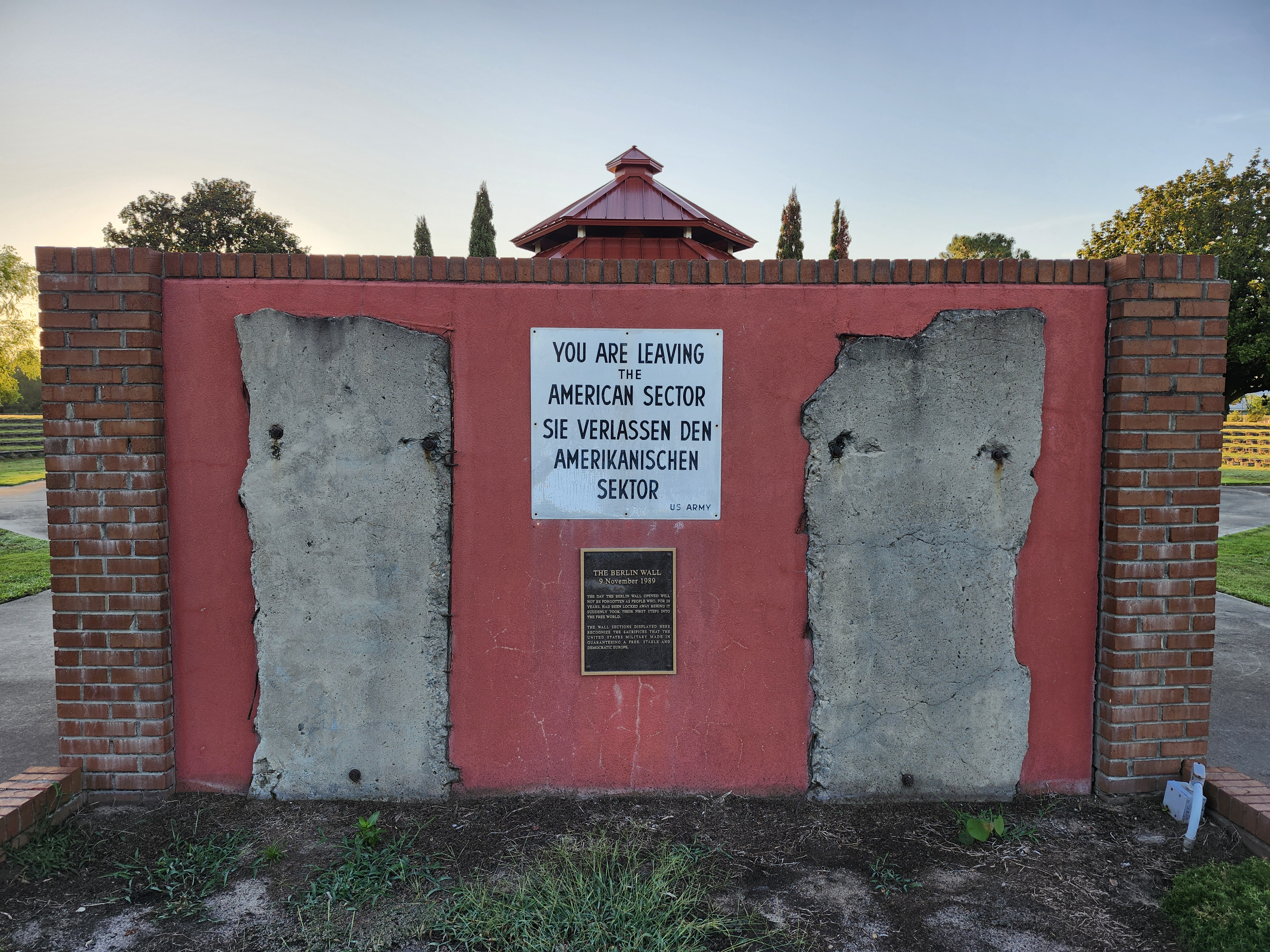
Sections of the Berlin Wall displayed at Fort Gordon

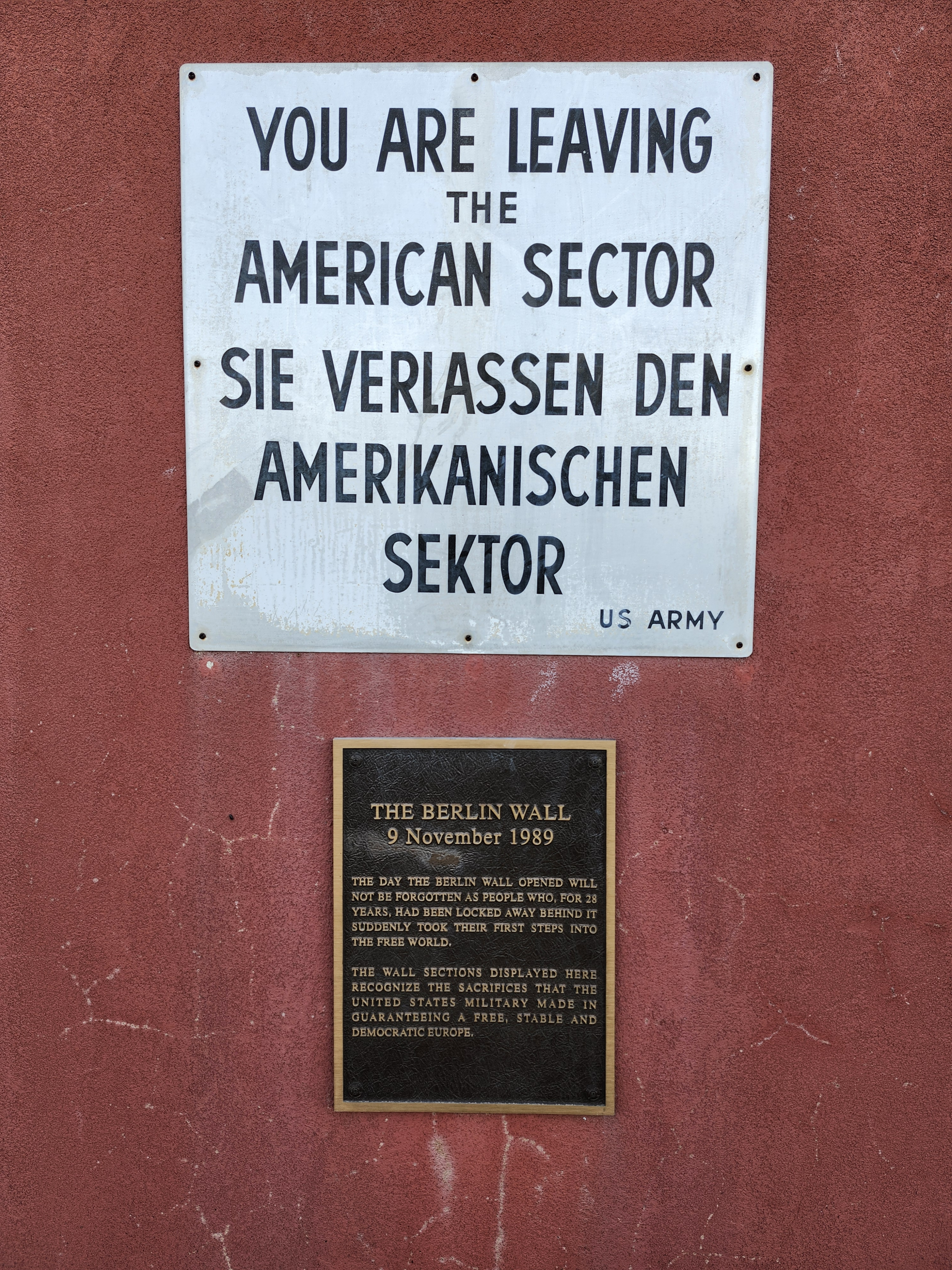
The sign and the plaque

== Barton Field ==
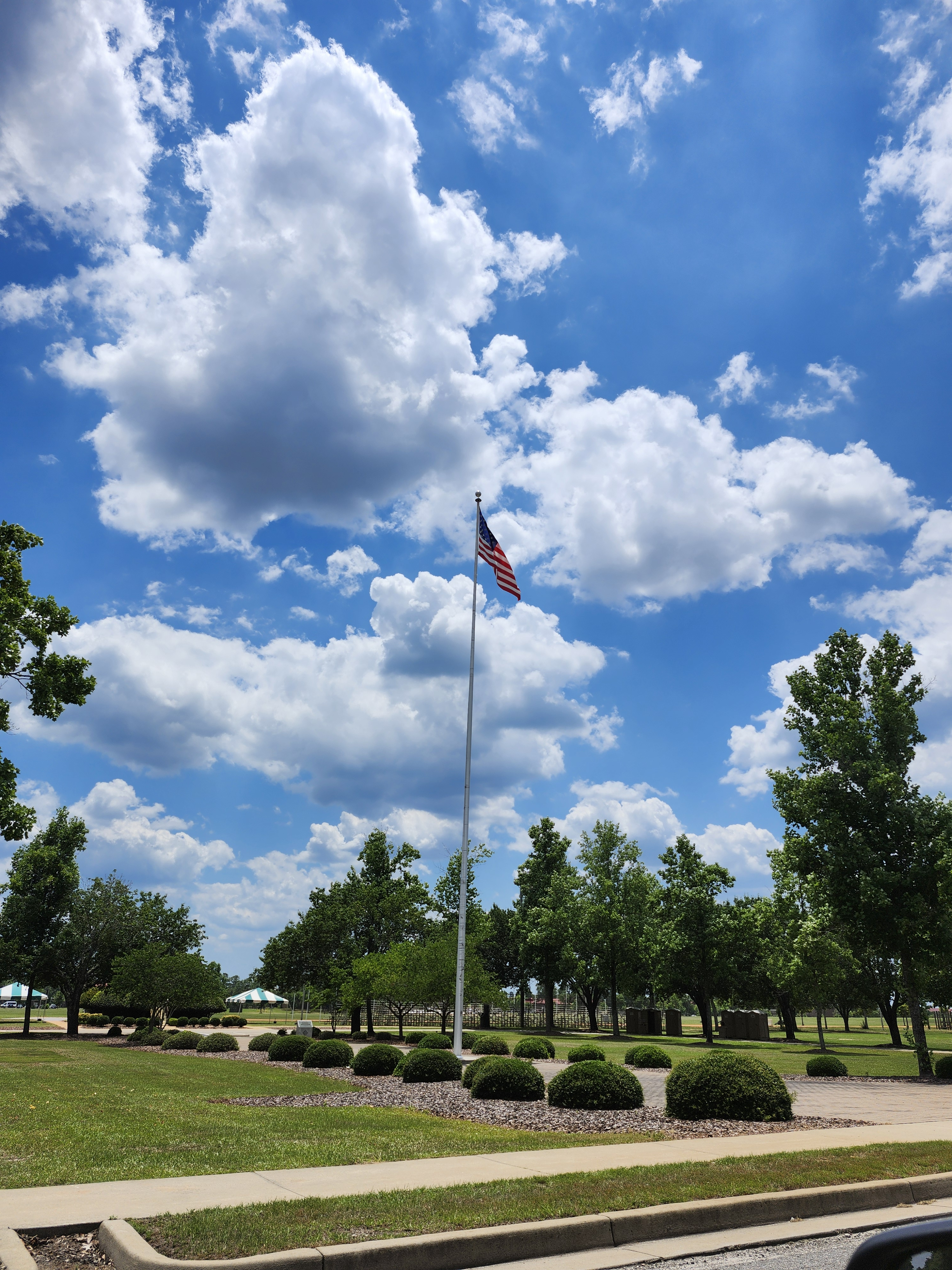
The main post flag just north of Barton Field at Fort Gordon

Barton Field is a large open field and parade ground that occupies a large tract of land in the center of Fort Gordon. It is named after World War II Major General Raymond O. Barton Sr., a local resident of Augusta and prominent commander during the assault on Normandy during D-Day on 6 June 1944. Barton Field is used extensively for festivals, events, and morning physical fitness training for units stationed at Fort Gordon.

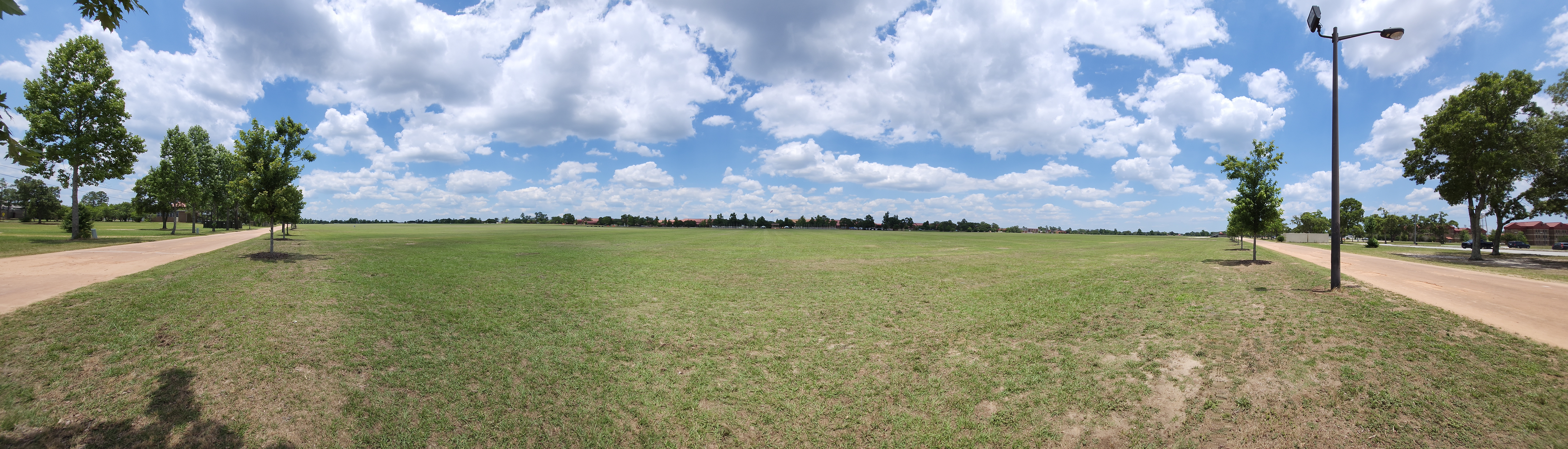
A panorama of Barton Field in 2024

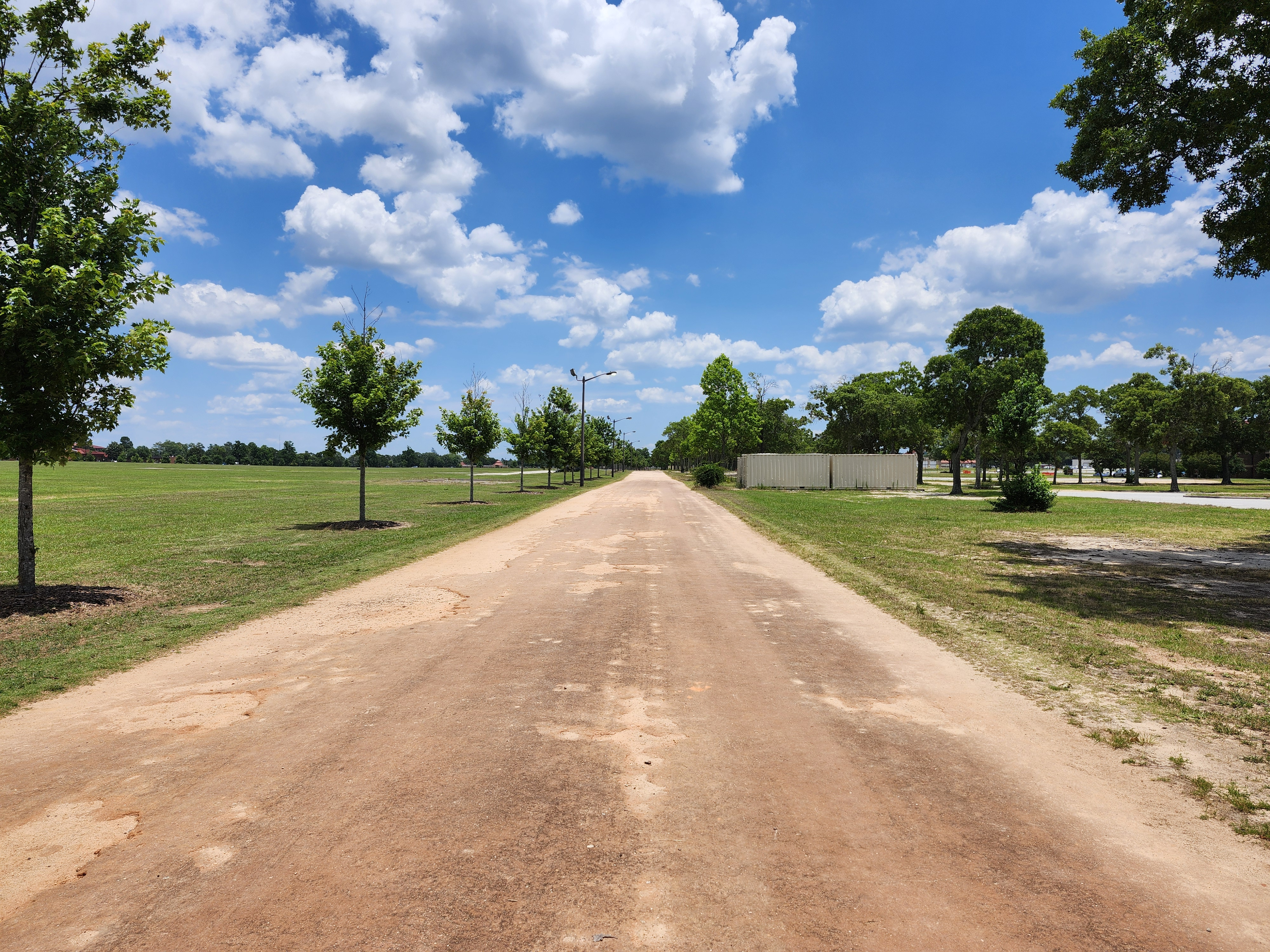
A running track measuring just under three miles in total completely encircles Barton Field.

== Post amenities ==
Fort Gordon contains numerous amenities and recreational facilities for the personnel stationed there, with some being open to the public. Gordon Lakes Golf Club is a fully equipped golf course on post. Five Star Lanes on 3rd Street is a 24-lane bowling center which also contains a full lunch counter and snack bar and the Heroes Bar which houses pool tables and volleyball courts. Fort Gordon is also home to an outdoor pool and water park, an escape room, the Hilltop Riding Stables, numerous gyms and fitness centers, a disc golf course, shooting range, and commercial eateries and Army dining facilities.

The main post exchange (PX) and commissary are located on 3rd Avenue Bypass. The PX is operated by the Army & Air Force Exchange Service and provides shops tailored to the military as well as a general department store. The PX also contains chain stores like GameStop and a UPS Store as well as food court with Starbucks, Popeyes, Taco Bell, Subway and other fast-food brands.

The Fort Gordon Commissary is a full-service grocery store on post that offers curbside pickup. One of the brands of household products featured at the commissary is Skilcraft, which are manufactured by visually impaired, blind, and disabled individuals. There are also numerous "shoppettes" or troop stores on post similar in size and offering to a typical convenience store.

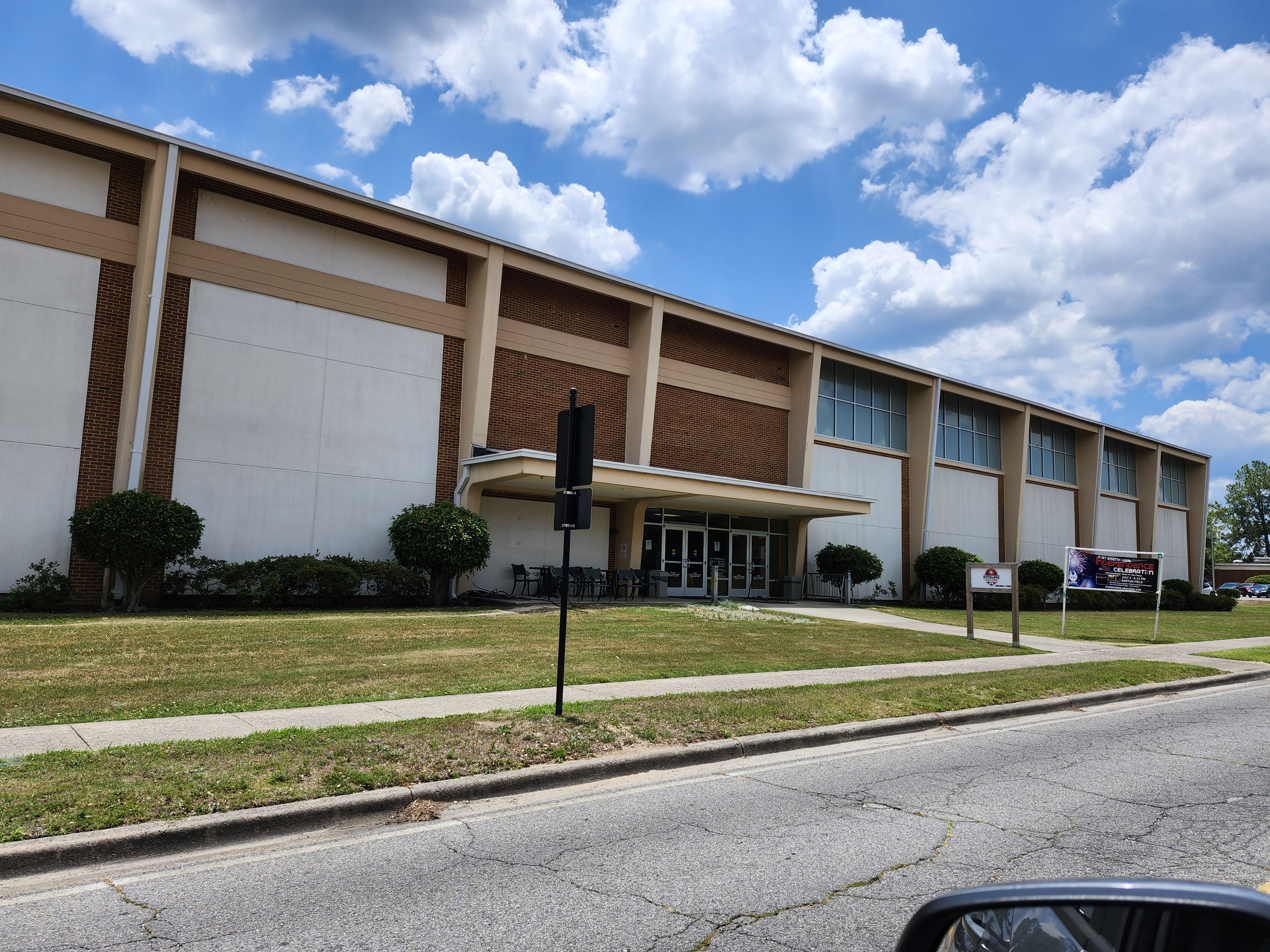
The Overlord Fitness Center on Barnes Avenue

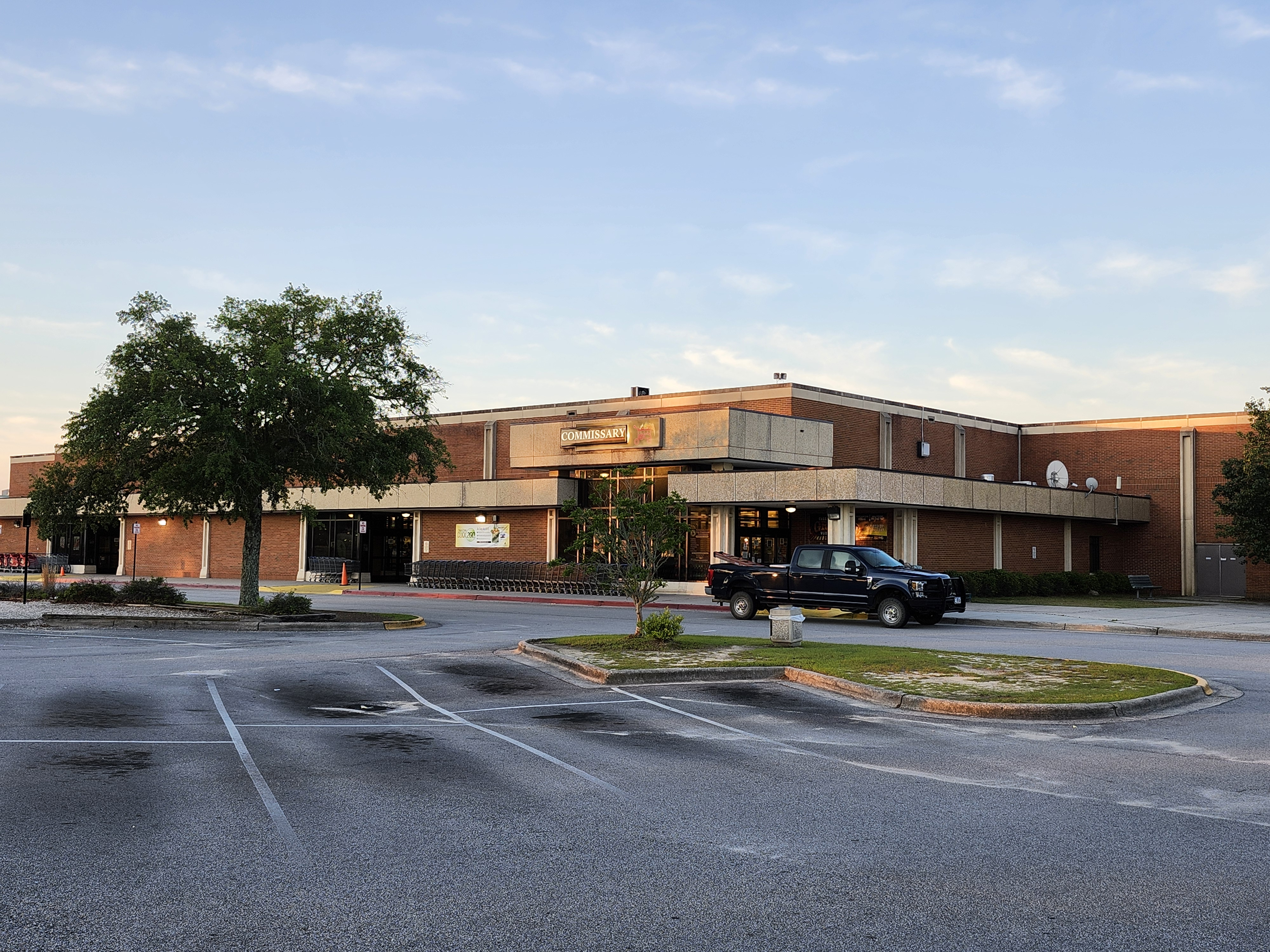
Fort Gordon Commissary

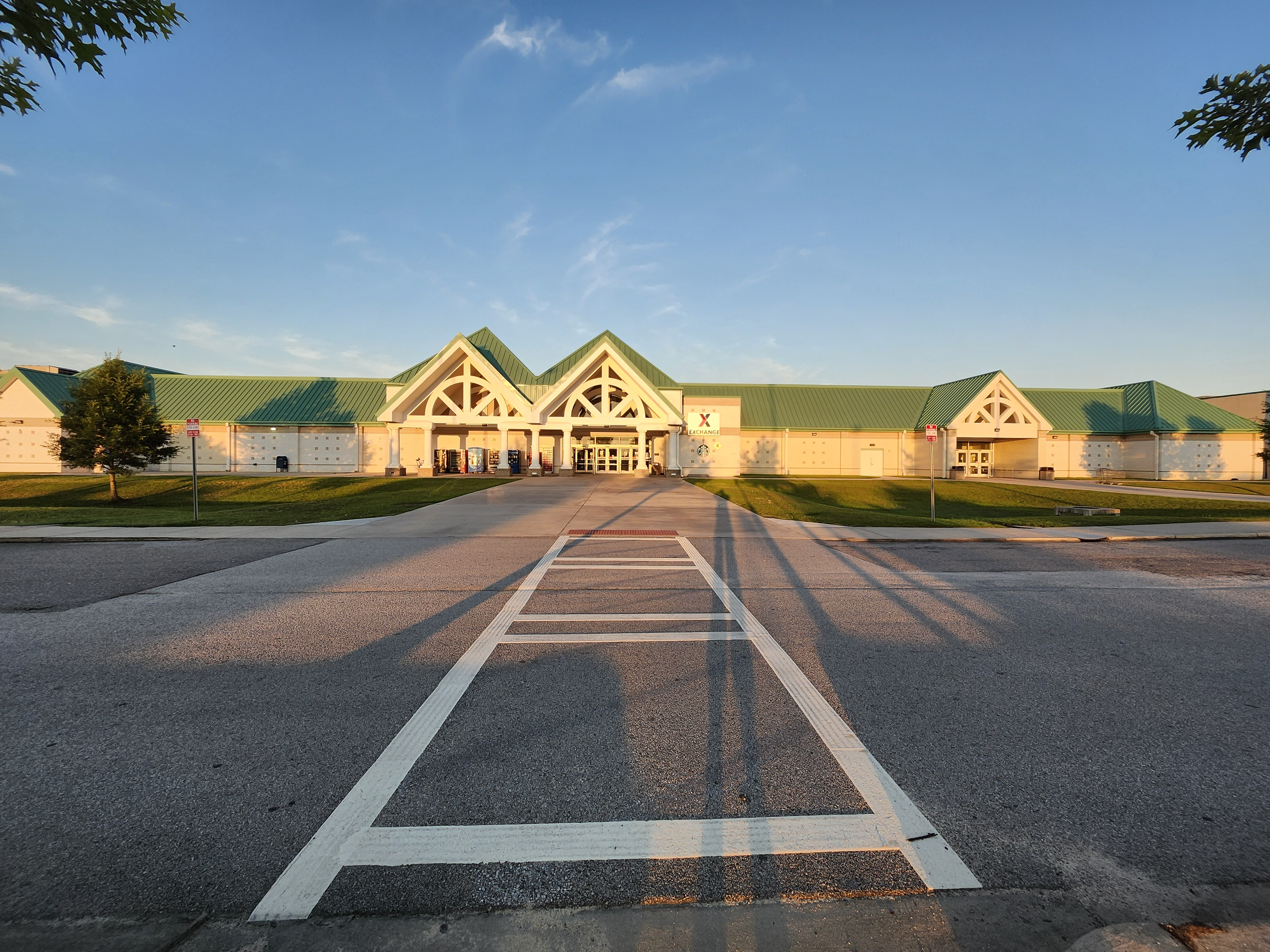
The main post exchange (PX)

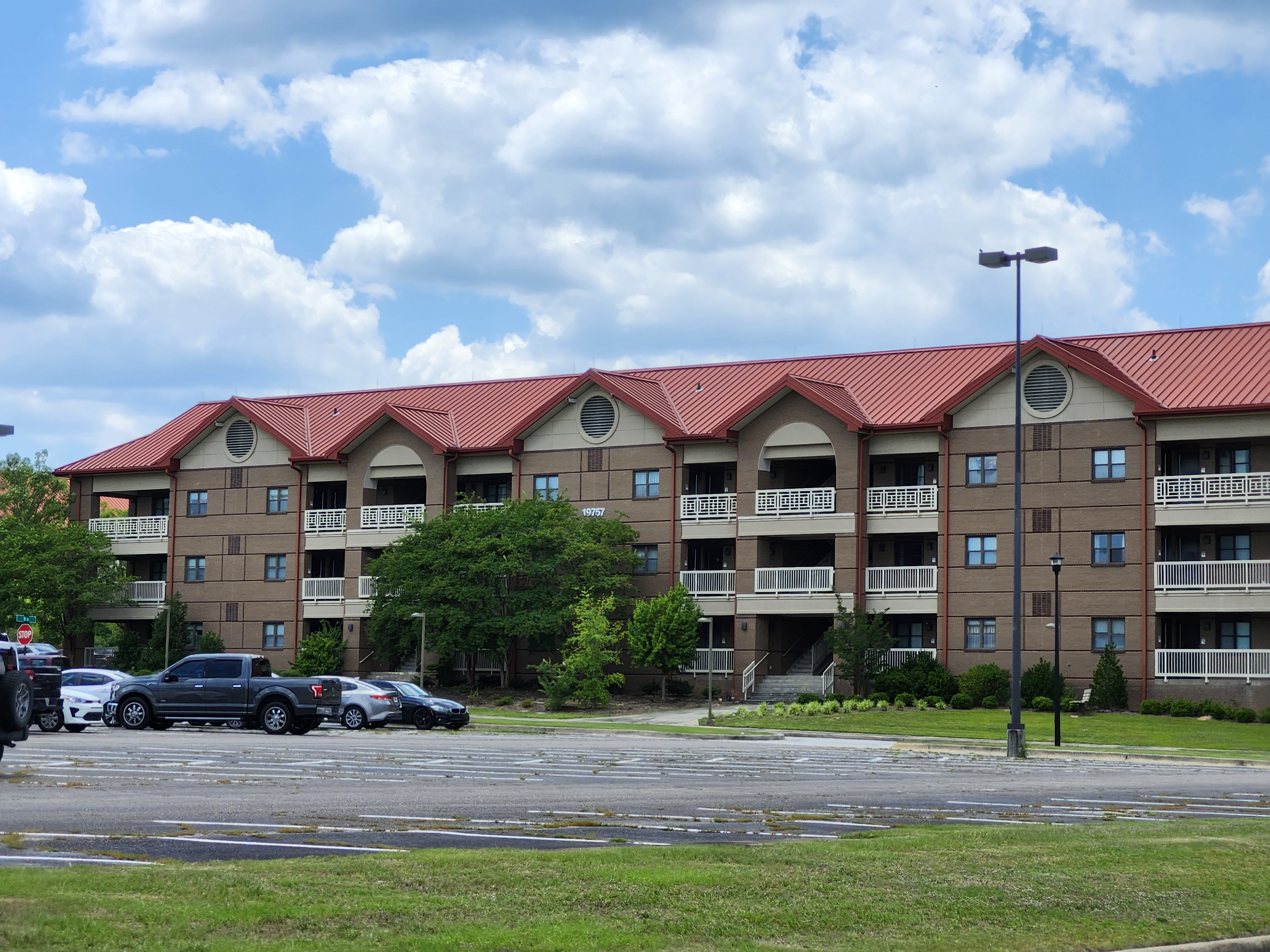
Typical barracks housing permanent-party soldiers at Fort Gordon

== Woodworth Library ==
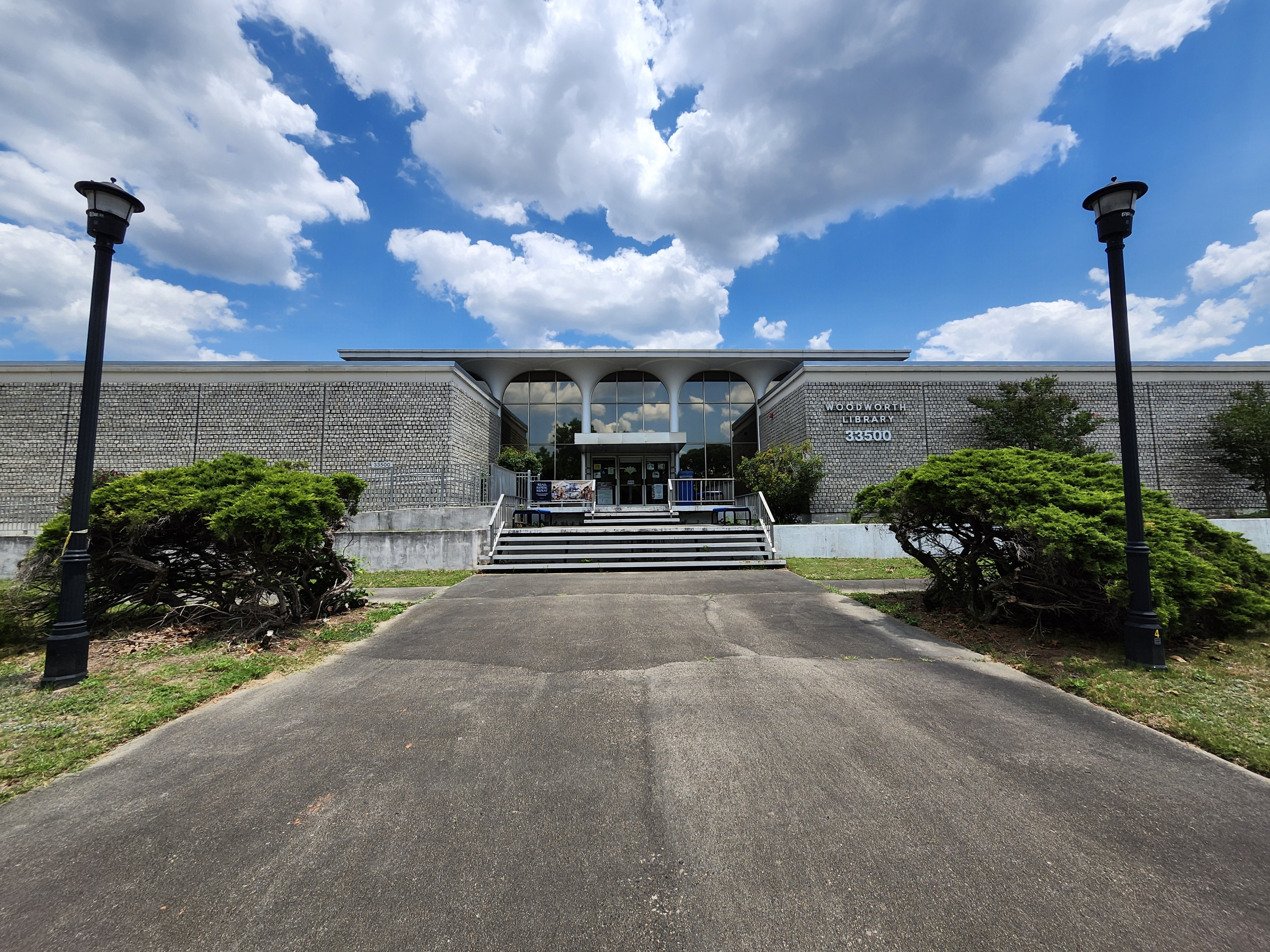
Woodworth Library

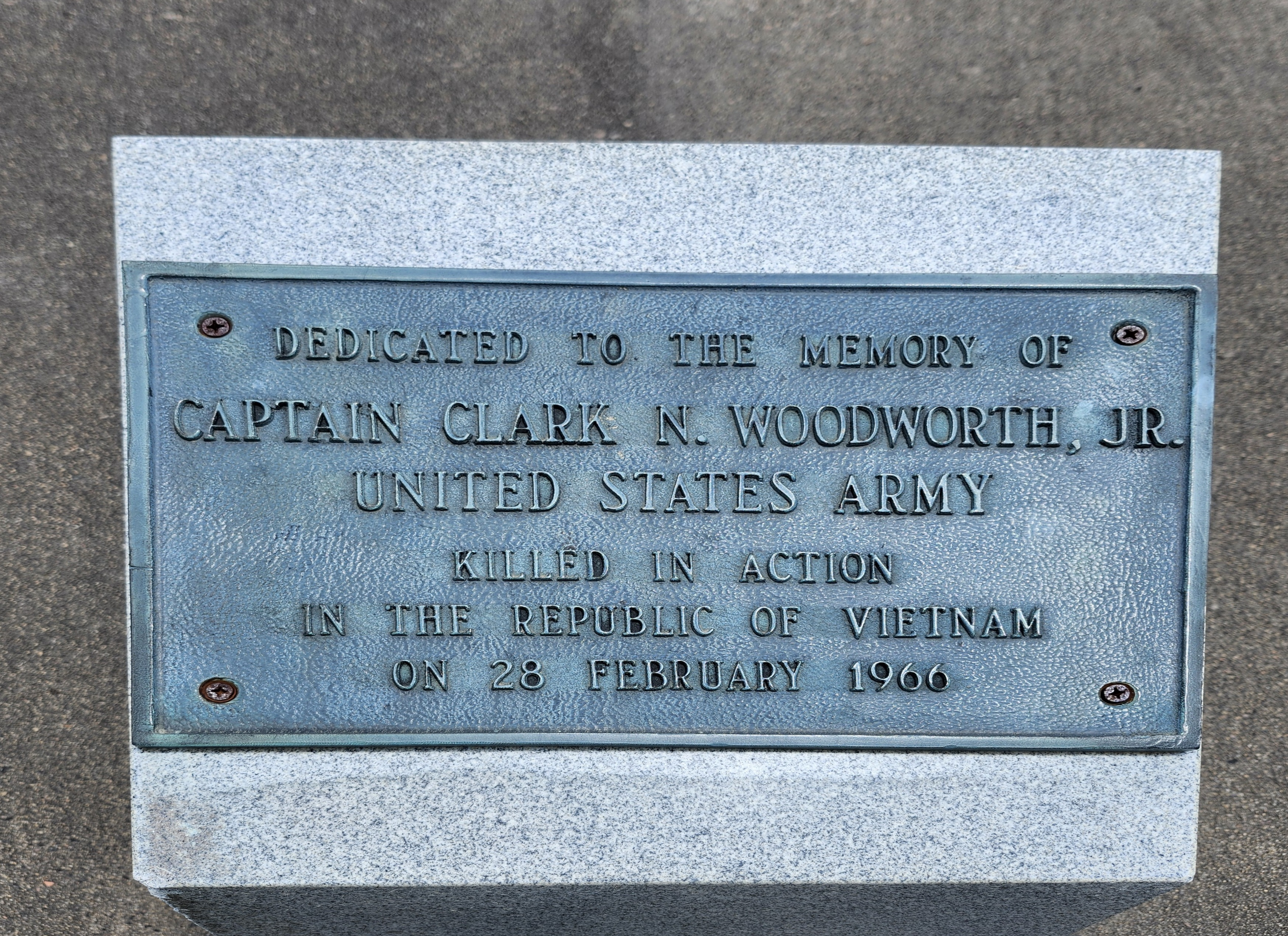
A plaque at Woodworth Library

Woodworth Library on Rice Road is the primary library on post, open to military personnel and their dependents. The library is named after Captain Clark Newell Woodworth Jr., the former commander of Charlie Company, Seventh Battalion at Fort Gordon (then Fort Gordon) from December 1964 to December 1965.

Captain Woodworth was killed in Vietnam in February 1966, and his name appears at the Vietnam Veterans Memorial in Washington, D.C. The library houses about 40,000 books and also contains a computer lab for use by patrons.

Woodworth Library is directly across the street from Barton Field.

== See also ==
- Cyber Quest
