= Euler (disambiguation) =

Leonhard Euler (1707–1783) was a Swiss mathematician and physicist.

Euler may also refer to:

== Science and technology ==
- Euler (crater), a lunar impact crater in the southern half of the Mare Imbrium
- Euler (programming language), a computer programming language
- Euler (software), a numerical software package
- 2002 Euler, an asteroid
- AMS Euler, a typeface
- Euler angles, a way to describe the orientation of a rigid body
- EulerOS, a Linux operating system distribution
- Euler-Werke, an aircraft manufacturer owned by August Euler.
- Project Euler a series of challenging mathematical/computer programming problems

== Other uses ==
- Euler (surname)
- EULAR, European rheumatology organization
- Euler jump, an edge jump in figure skating
- Euler Hermes, a global credit insurance company

== See also ==
- List of things named after Leonhard Euler
- Euller (disambiguation)
- Oiler (disambiguation)
