= Euler D.II =

1917 German fighter aircraft

General information
- Type: Fighter
- Manufacturer: Euler-Werke
- Designer: August Euler
- Primary user: Luftstreitkräfte
- Number built: 30

History
- Introduction date: December 1917
- First flight: early 1917
- Retired: 1918

The Euler D.II was a German single-seat fighter, the successor to the earlier Euler D.I. The D.II was essentially a re-engined Euler D.I, the air-frame being virtually unchanged and the power plant being a 100 hp Oberusel U I 9-cylinder rotary.

== Operational history ==
30 D.II fighters were ordered by the German air force in March 1917, however due to slow production these were not delivered until December 1917. As a result, the D.II was relegated to the role of a trainer aircraft for the rest of the war.

== Operators ==
German Empire

- Luftstreitkräfte

== Specifications ==
Data from German Aircraft of the First World War

General characteristics

- Crew: 1
- Length: 5.94 m (19 ft 6 in)
- Wingspan: 7.47 m (24 ft 6 in)
- Height: 2.75 m (9 ft 0 in)
- Empty weight: 380 kg (838 lb)
- Gross weight: 615 kg (1,356 lb)
- Powerplant: 1 × Oberursel U.I 9-cylinder air-cooled rotary piston engine, 75 kW (100 hp)
- Propellers: 4-bladed fixed-pitch propeller

Performance

- Maximum speed: 145 km/h (90 mph, 78 kn)
- Endurance: 1 hour 30 minutes
- Time to altitude: 2,000 m (6,600 ft) in 9 minutes 30 seconds

Armament

- Guns: 1 x engine-mounted 7.92mm machine gun
