= Euler D.I =

German fighter biplane

General information
- Type: Fighter
- Manufacturer: Euler-Werke
- Designer: August Euler
- Primary user: Luftstreitkräfte
- Number built: around 75

History
- Introduction date: 1917
- First flight: Autumn 1916
- Retired: 1920
- Variant: Euler D.II

The Euler D.I was a German single-seat fighter based on the French Nieuport 11. After seeing the success of the French Nieuport 11 at the front, German designer August Euler set about to create a German aircraft based on the Nieuport design. The Euler D.I first flew in late 1916. It was powered by an 80 hp engine with the Euler patented machine gun on the front.

== Operational history ==
Two prototypes were recorded as being in service at the front in October 1916, and the German government ordered 50 in the same month. A further 50 were ordered in early 1917, but this order was largely transferred over to the D.I's successor, the Euler D.II. The plane saw very little combat service, being largely used as a fighter trainer for the remainder of the war.

== Operators ==
German Empire

- Luftstreitkräfte;

== Specifications ==
Data from

General characteristics

- Crew: 1
- Length: 8.1 m (26 ft 7 in)
- Wingspan: 13 m (42 ft 8 in)
- Height: 2.66 m (8 ft 9 in)
- Wing area: 13 m^{2} (140 sq ft)
- Empty weight: 380 kg (838 lb)
- Gross weight: 600 kg (1,323 lb)
- Powerplant: 1 × Oberursel U.0 7-cylinder air-cooled radial piston engine, 60 kW (80 hp)
- Propellers: 2-bladed wooden fixed-pitch propeller

Performance

- Maximum speed: 140 km/h (87 mph, 76 kn)
- Time to altitude: 2,000 m (6,600 ft) in 12.5 minutes

Armament

- Guns: 1 x engine-mounted 7.92-mm machine gun
