= List of ship decommissionings in 1942 =

The list of ship decommissionings in 1942 is a chronological list of ships decommissioned in 1942. In cases where no official decommissioning ceremony was held, the date of withdrawal from service may be used instead. For ships lost at sea, see list of shipwrecks in 1942 instead.

	Operator	Ship	Class and type	Fate	Other notes
20 February	United States Navy	USS Suwannee	Cimarron-class oiler	Conversion to escort aircraft carrier	Recommissioned in September 1942
25 February	United States Navy	USS Sangamon	Cimarron-class oiler	Conversion to escort aircraft carrier	Recommissioned in August 1942
28 February	Spanish Navy	Almirante Lobo	Transport	Stricken 1945; scrapped	Hulked since 1939
16 March	United States Navy	USS Chenango	Cimarron-class oiler	Conversion to escort aircraft carrier	Recommissioned in September 1942
Spring	United States Navy	USS Santee	Cimarron-class oiler	Conversion to escort aircraft carrier	Recommissioned in August 1942
