= Euler (surname) =

Euler is a German surname. Notable people with the surname include:

- Leonhard Euler (1707–1783), Swiss mathematician and physicist
- Carl Euler (1834–1901), Swiss ornithologist
- Hans Heinrich Euler (1901–1941), German physicist
- Ingeborg Euler (1927-2005), German journalist and writer
- Johann Euler (1734–1800), Swiss-Russian astronomer and mathematician
- Ulf von Euler (1905–1983), Swedish physiologist, pharmacologist and Nobel laureate
- Hans von Euler-Chelpin (1873–1964), Swedish biochemist and Nobel laureate
- August Euler (1868–1957), German pioneer aviator
- William Daum Euler (1875–1961), Canadian politician
