= Dagger Complex =

US Army base in Darmstadt, Hesse, Germany

Coordinates: 49°50′37.61″N 8°35′3.25″E

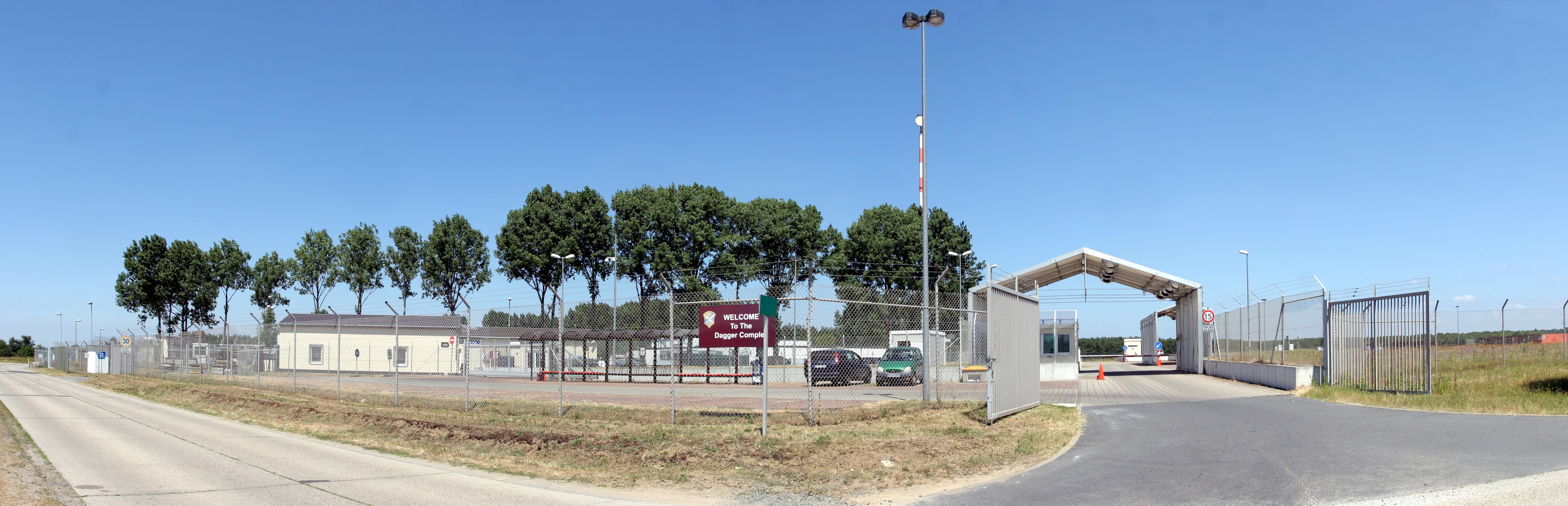
The Dagger Complex as 180°-Panorama

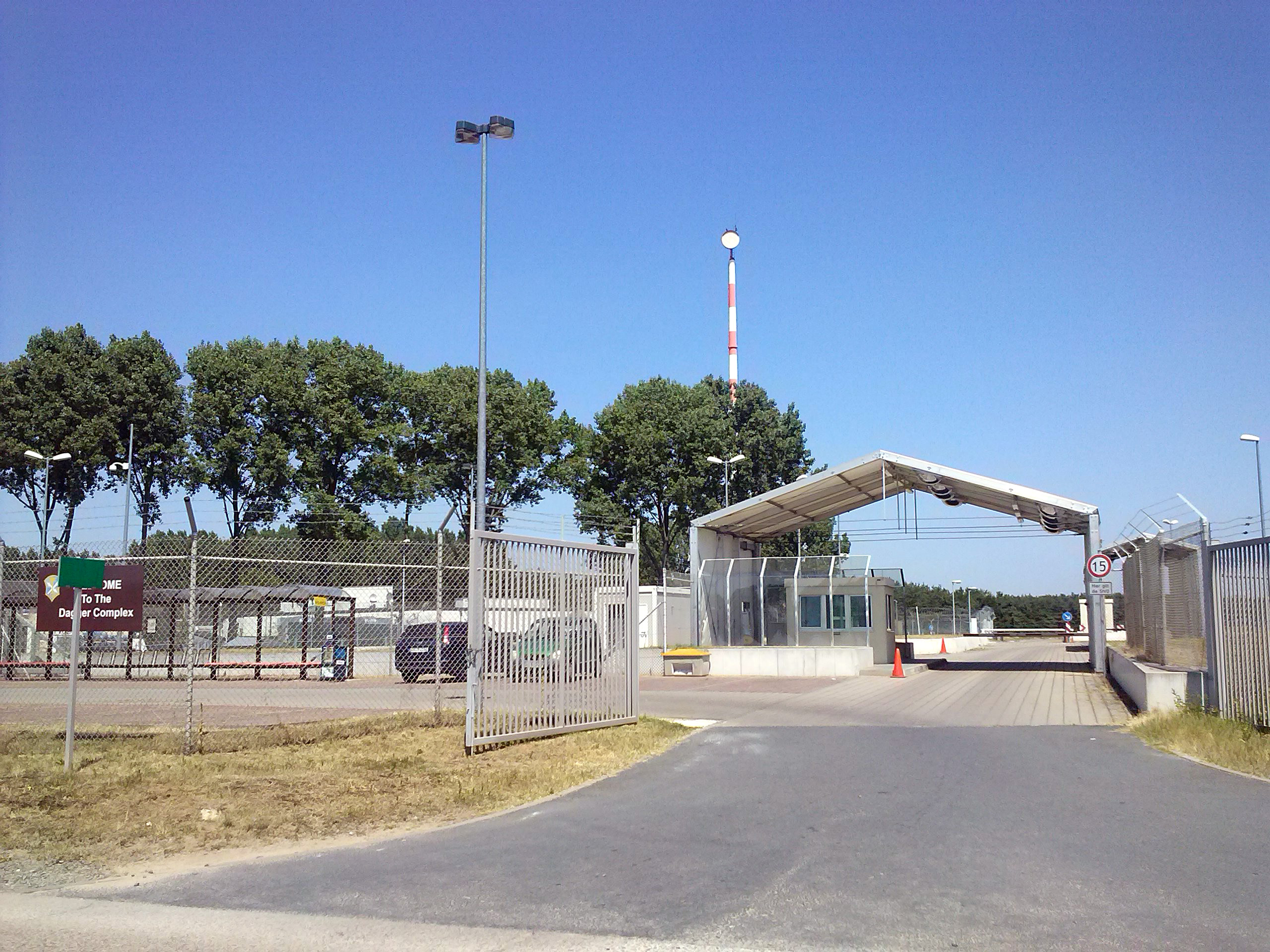
Main gate

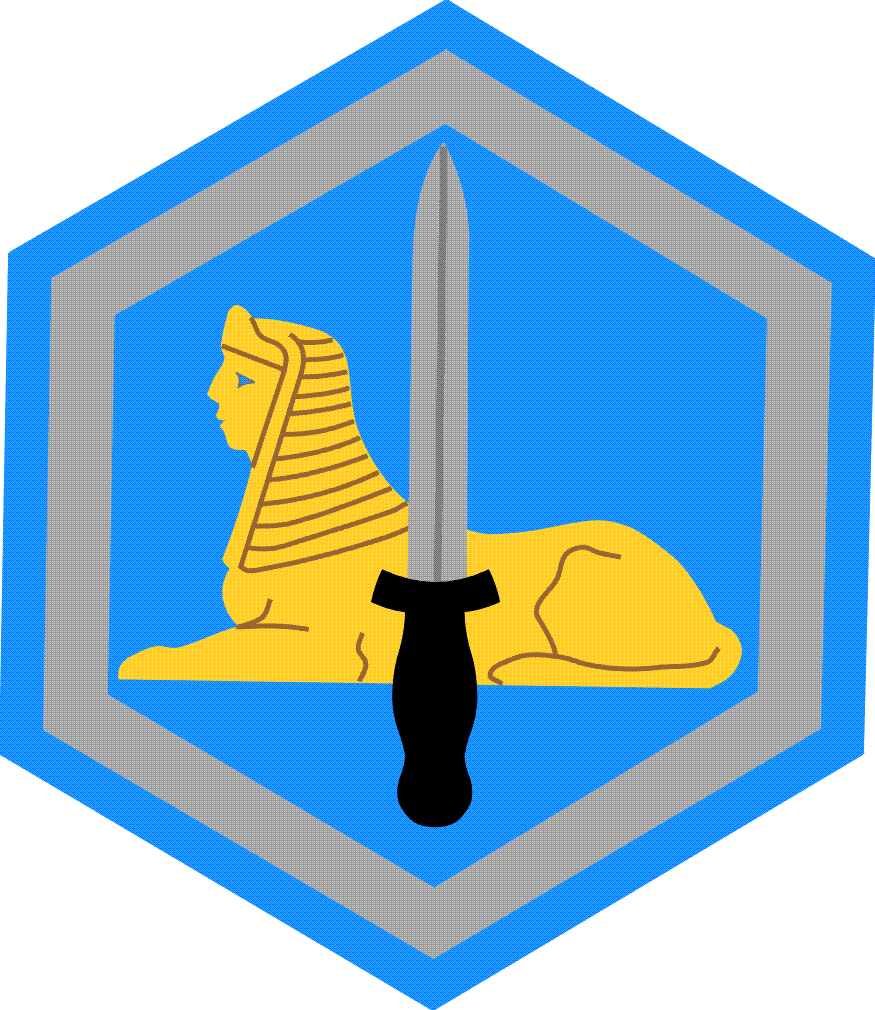
Shouldersleeve 66 MI Bde

The Dagger Complex is a US military base in Darmstadt (Germany), close to Griesheim and located at the Eberstädter Weg, south of the August-Euler-Airfield.

The complex is under US Army Intelligence and Security Command (INSCOM) command on behalf of the US National Security Agency (NSA) and is officially known as Subunit 1 operated by USMC G Company. After a large basement expansion at the complex in 2002 it hosted an important SIGINT processing, analysis and reporting center.

As the entire SIGINT unit relocated to the Lucius D.Clay Barracks at Wiesbaden in 2016 as part of the new Information Processing Center (IPC) which is part of the US Consolidated Intelligence Center (CIC), which was brought into operation in the 2010s, the status of the Dagger complex has been changed into a military datacenter. All processing, analysis and reporting activities now take place in Wiesbaden.

== History ==
In 1999 about 50 INSCOM-units were moved from Bad Aibling Station to other locations. Together with INSCOM, then 66th Military Intelligence Group moved to Darmstadt.

This unit started as 66th CIC Detachment based in Stuttgart at its reactivation in 1951. In 1952 redesignated 66th CIC Group and in 1977 after an army-wide intel reorganisation assigned to INSCOM. In 1986 relocated to Augsburg being redesignated 66th Military Intelligence Brigade. In 1995 temporarily redesignated 66th MI Group. Relocated again to Dagger compound Darmstadt as of 1998. Definitely 66th MI Group in 2002 until its final redesignation 66th MI Brigade and its staffing relocation to Wiesbaden Army Airfield in 2008.

Until 2015 the Dagger Complex based the European Cryptologic Center (ECC) structured as F2 which had been operated by mixed operational crews consisting of specialized personnel from the NSA, the US Army 66th Military Intelligence Brigade, the USAF 693rd Intelligence, Surveillance and Reconnaissance Group and the USMC Marine Cryptologic Support Battalion; all under the command of the 66th Military Intelligence Brigade, which was then awaiting their relocation to Wiesbaden. These specialists used to interpret and analyse all intercepted metadata obtained by

- the ICEBOX (2003–2008) facility constructed at former Darmstadt Army Airfield at grid 49°51'19"N 8°35'12"E and
- the TENCAP (2005–2009) facility constructed at former Finthen Army Airfield at grid 49°58'8"N 8° 9'46"E.

Above mentioned facilities have been removed respectively by the end of 2009 and 2013.

In 2015, the Peng Collective operated an airborne leaflet strike over the facility as part of their Intelexit program, to call the employees to quit their job in case of ethical or psychological distress. Shortly after the drop of the leaflets, the association's website was blocked on computers within the complex.

== See also ==
- Colorado Cryptologic Center
- Georgia Cryptologic Center
- Hawaii Cryptologic Center
- Texas Cryptologic Center
