= Consolidated Intelligence Center =

Controversial US intelligence facility under construction in Wiesbaden

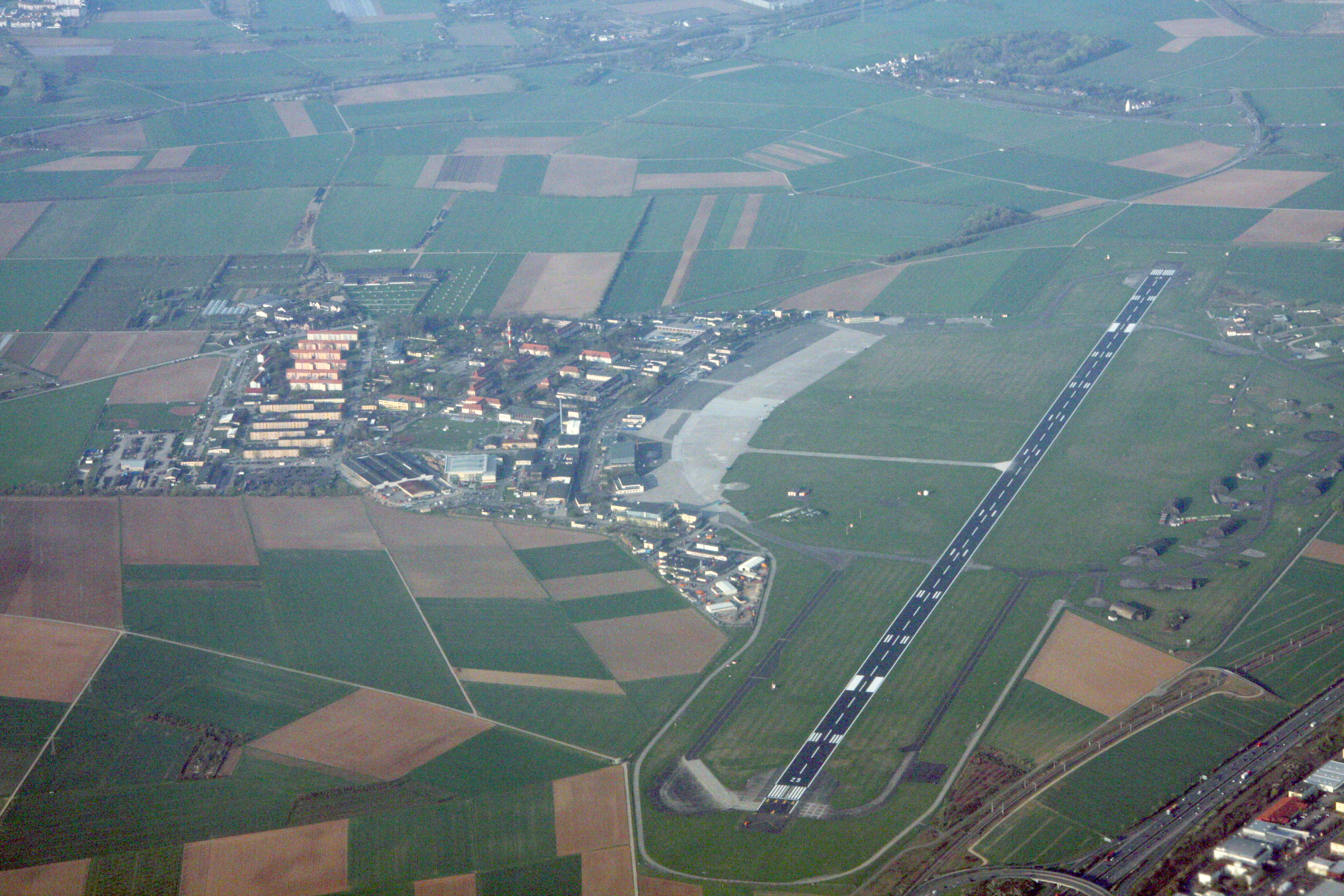
Wiesbaden Army Airfield and Lucius D. Clay Barracks, 2009

The Consolidated Intelligence Center (CIC, German: Vereinigtes Nachrichtendienstliches Zentrum) in Wiesbaden, Germany, is a controversial US intelligence facility under construction by the US Army Europe, located on the grounds of the Lucius D. Clay Barracks in Wiesbaden-Erbenheim, formerly Wiesbaden Army Airfield, about eight kilometres southeast of downtown Wiesbaden. The purpose of the facility, according to the US Army, is to support US forces with tactical theatre-of-war support and strategic intelligence functions. As such, it is implied that data fusion would also take place at this location.

The base has been the source of much controversy in Germany, especially since the US has claimed that the facility would not be used by the NSA, which leaked documents and the former President of the Bundesnachrichtendienst (BND) have confirmed to be a lie. This circumstance led to the question of whether the US government tried to mislead the German public and the German federal government or whether the federal government had helped the US cover up the purpose of the facility. The German public and a significant number German politicians across the political spectrum are highly critical of American espionage programmes like XKeyscore or ECHELON. Security experts in Germany calculated that by the year 2000, American industrial espionage was already causing annual economic losses of at least €10 billion per year to the German economy due to stolen inventions and development projects – the number having likely only risen since then due to the increase of digitisation. Additionally, the German Parliamentary Committee investigation of the NSA spying scandal found that the NSA had also "massively" spied on EU politicians and agencies as well as illegally collecting the communications of over 8 million EU citizens. A YouGov poll from 2018 showed the plurality of Germans is for a complete removal of all US troops from Germany, increasing the pressure on the federal government to also halt the operations of the Consolidated Intelligence Center and its activities.

== Construction ==
In 2012, the US Army announced the construction of an intelligence centre (Consolidated Intelligence Center) for €75 million and an information processing centre (Information Processing Center or Grey Center) for €25 million. The construction companies involved are required to receive security clearance, and the building materials are imported from the US and monitored on their way to Germany. The centre is to contain a Sensitive Compartmented Information Facility (SCIF) for handling information with high levels of secrecy. The costs for this amount to €28 million. Bob Close, Public Affairs Spokesperson for the headquarters, confirmed that the construction would be completed by the end of 2015. The personnel of the Dagger Complex in Griesheim is also to be relocated there. This includes about 1100 "Intelligence Professionals" and "Special Security Officers". OBG Engineering was awarded the contract for the design and construction of a multi-storey car park for the Consolidated Intelligence Center with 600 parking spaces and a multifunctional sports field (football, baseball, and American football) in early 2013.

In connection with the American global spying programmes revealed by Edward Snowden (see for example XKeyscore, PRISM, Carnivore, ECHELON, MYSTIC, etc.) Der Spiegel reported on 7 July 2013 that the facility would also be used by the NSA. The US denied that the facility would be used by the NSA later that month. However, the former President of the BND, Gerhard Schindler, confirmed to the Bundestag Committee on Internal Affairs that the CIC is indeed a wiretapping centre of the NSA.

== Reactions ==
Ulla Jelpke, domestic policy spokesperson for the Left Party's parliamentary group in the Bundestag, said that by accepting an NSA surveillance centre in Wiesbaden, the federal government was making itself "an accomplice to one of the biggest surveillance scandals in the history of the Federal Republic".

The SPD and the Greens in the Hessian parliament are demanding clarification from Interior Minister Boris Rhein (CDU) about the espionage centre.

Felix Kisseler, deputy leader of the Green parliamentary group in the Wiesbaden city council, called it a "scandal" that an American wiretapping centre was built in the immediate vicinity of the world's largest internet hubs, DE-CIX in Frankfurt.

According to the Frankfurter Allgemeine, the state government of Hesse was not informed about the purpose of the facility. An enquiry was reportedly sent to the federal government in June 2014.

== See also ==
- Bad Aibling Station
- Ramstein Air Base
- List of US Army installations in Germany
- Pine Gap
