= Adinotec =

Provider of road construction materials

Adinotec AG
- Type: Public
- Traded as: FWB: N1N
- Industry: Road Construction; Technology
- Founded: December 19, 2004; 21 years ago Griesheim, Germany
- Founder: Edmund Krix
- Headquarters: Munich, Germany
- Area served: Worldwide
- Key people: Curt Alexander Papenberg (CEO); Thomas Milde (Chairman of the Supervisory Board)
- Number of employees: 5
- Website: www.adinotec.com

Adinotec AG is a German provider of road construction technology based in Munich, Bavaria, Germany. The company was founded on 19 December 2004 in Griesheim, Germany, and initially named Neosino. Brokered by VEM Aktienbank, now DERO Bank, it was listed in the Entry Standard segment of the Frankfurt Stock Exchange on 4 January 2006. Founder Edmund Krix served as CEO until 21 October 2015, when he was replaced by Curt Alexander Papenberg.

Adinotec's flagship brand is Perenium (from the Latin word 'perennitas' - that which lasts a long time). Used for sub-grade improvement and sub-base stabilisation in road construction and road refurbishment, Perenium acts in conjunction with hydraulic binders. Based on specific formulations using, amongst other agents, latex and a number of derivatives, road construction with Perenium can net significant cost savings.

== History ==
1,35 million shares were issued in 2006, initially traded at €55,55 . During the first half of 2005, revenues of €347.000 were generated, with a posted loss of €193.000 . In the first two quarters of 2006 the loss rose to €800.000 against revenues of €900.000 . On 18 April 2008 the Annual General Meeting decided to change the company name to Adinotec.

The original purpose of the company was to manufacture nanoparticles of between three and ten nanometers for use in food supplements and in cosmetics. Grinding down various minerals to nanoparticle size, using a novel mechanical process, was supposed to facilitate their absorption by the human body and increase efficiency. Scientific corroboration of the claimed beneficial effect of nanoparticles proved elusive. For that reason, the company abandoned its initial research into nanotechnology and focused on the manufacture of polymer additives used in road construction. The leading product, initially branded nanoSTAB, was manufactured by a subsidiary named Poligate.

On 28 August 2009 the management board decided, with the consent of the supervisory board, an increase of share capital of 600.000 EUR, which fell well within the limits of the already authorized capital. First, a cash capital increase with subscription rights was carried out up to EUR 200,000 by issuing up to 200,000 new shares. A statutory subscription right was granted to entitled shareholders in the way that new shares could be offered through VEM Bank AG at a ratio of 2:1 for a subscription price of EUR 10.00 per share.

== Present ==
On 4 November 2015, the company filed for insolvency due to illiquidity and on 4 February 2016 insolvency proceedings were initiated and the company placed under its own administration. On 25 May 2016 the creditors agreed an insolvency plan, requested by the Court, an on 23 September 2016 insolvency proceedings were officially terminated. Since then the company is debt-free and regained full legal capacity.
