= Peng Collective =

The Peng Collective is a group of culture jamming activists based in Berlin. In 2016, the collective was part of the Berlin Biennale, in 2018 of the Manifesta Biennale and the Athens Biennale. In 2018, they were awarded the Aachen Peace Prize. It was originally founded as Peng Media in 1998. Since 2019, the group offers free consulting for climate-change related issues.

== Approaches ==
Through actions of tactical media, the Peng Collective wants to inspire other activists and civil society organisations to be more courageous in their campaigning methods. "Let's learn from our enemies," one of their members says in an interview. "If you look at the economics of corporations, their state of mind is: 'let's look at every possible gray area of laws and use them.' And NGOs just don't do that." They are known for wearing animal masks as sign of biological appropriation whenever they are on stage and to break the law "whenever necessary for the greater good. And yes, the arts can be a greater good."

== Projects ==
=== googlenest ===
They got international media attention when they held a presentation called "Your data, our future" in the Name of Google at Europe's largest tech conference re:publica in 2014. All presented products were designed to gather more data from the consumers, claiming that this is in their best interest. After Google threatened them to take down their parody website, the Electronic Frontier Foundation (EFF) supported them legally:

Unfortunately, Google's skin was not thick enough to withstand this relatively gently ribbing. The company wrote a polite note to the collective, expressing their sincere respect for political commentary—but nonetheless demanding that Peng! revise the site and assign the domain name to Google. Note to Google: polite trademark bullying is still bullying. EFF responded to Google on Peng's behalf, explaining what should be obvious: the site was pure noncommercial political commentary. Trademark owners should not and cannot punish activists simply because they happen to use trademarks in the course of that kind of commentary.

— Corynne Mcsherry in an EFF letter to Google: Parody Is Not Trademark Infringement

=== Slamshell ===
Invited as fake persona to a conference of the oil company Shell, they created an oil spill on stage instead of the expected presentation. The evening was a public relations event organized by Burson Marsteller in Berlin, where one member of the Collective could enter the stage because he claimed to have created a car that is cleaning the air.

=== Cooperation with the Yes Men ===
In 2015, the group infiltrated the Cinema for Peace Gala in Berlin with a fake polar bear and The Yes Men to go on stage and insist that divestment from fossil fuels is helping more against climate change than charity projects. Pussy Riot, who was invited as speaker to the charity gala came to support them, when the organizers of the event tried to silence them with security guards.

=== Zero Trollerance ===
In May 2015, they developed a bot script that scans Twitter for abusive and sexist language. Once detected, plenty of automated Twitter profiles would reply to those tweets with an invitation to a self-help program for trolls to become feminists.

=== Intelexit ===
In September 2015, the Peng Collective staged an association named Intelexit helping anyone working for secret services to quit their jobs and transition to civil life, be it for ethical or psychological reasons.

During the launch of the campaign, they rallied with an advertising trucks and mobile billboards in front of several secret services workplaces around the world like the German BND, the GCHQ Headquarters in the UK, the US military bases in Germany Dagger Complex and Lucius D. Clay Kaserne and the NSA's Headquarters in the US, Maryland, where they also drove to the employees lunch place Café Joe They also performed an airborne leaflet operation over the Dagger Complex with a drone advertising for the exit program.

Intelexit now operates phone booth installations in arts and journalists venues where participants can call up secret service employees such as the FBI, NSA, CIA and private subcontractors like Trovicor or Booz Allen Hamilton in the US, but also officers from Germany, France, Canada and Great Britain. The organisation invites people to set up the call installation all over the world to create an ongoing dialogue between civil society and the intelligence community.

=== Artikel 26 ===
In Schwenke (Halver), Peng! had founded a fictitious CDU local association, which appealed to party leader Angela Merkel to campaign against the export of small arms in the next legislative period. This appeal was also reported in international media. Later the communication guerrilla action was confirmed by Peng!.

In the same week, Peng! started an alleged recall of small arms from the manufacturer Heckler & Koch by sending letters to US arms dealers on its behalf. The web pages of Heckler & Koch in the US and Germany were then provided for several days with the news that they had been the victims of a hacker attack and fake news.

In the same week, the group released a video documenting how they awarded a peace prize for the arms industry and how Thyssen Krupp Marine Systems only left shortly before the alleged award ceremony.

As part of this series of actions, Peng! published five legislative proposals for the renewal of the War Weapons Control Act and for the "Rescue of Article 26 GG".

=== Deutschland Geht Klauen ===
With this Campaign PENG urged people to shoplift in supermarkets and pay the equivalent amount to unions representing producers in the Global South instead. They set up an online system on their website, which operates like an online shop, through which people can pay eight unions campaigning for workers' rights. PENG also campaigns for a German law that would hold German companies accountable for human rights violations abroad.

=== Mask.ID ===
PENG created a photo-booth in which visitors could create portraits combining their own face with another person's by morphing the two together. The technology used neural networks from OpenAI and Adam Harvey's MegaPixels project. They created a German passport bearing a portrait that morphed the face of one of their members with that of Federica Mogherini. They sent five such passports to artists in Libya, each bearing a portrait morphing the artist's face with that of a PENG member, so the artists could use them to enter Europe. PENG described this as an act of civil disobedience against European border controls. The photo booth was also shown at art exhibitions in Vienna and Munich.

=== Civil Financial Regulation Office ===
On the Athens Biennale 2018 named "ANTI", Peng contributed by installing a call center with six Greek employees paid by German tax money on minimum wage who are calling the financial regulation institutions for six weeks. They ask them questions that are being posted on their website and try to get them to explain the logic of financial argumentation in understandable language.
