= Euller =

Euller is a given name. It may refer to:

- Euller (footballer, born 1971), Brazilian football forward Euller Elias de Carvalho
- Euller (footballer, born 1995), Brazilian football left-back Elosman Euller Silva Cavalcanti

== See also ==
- Euler (disambiguation)
