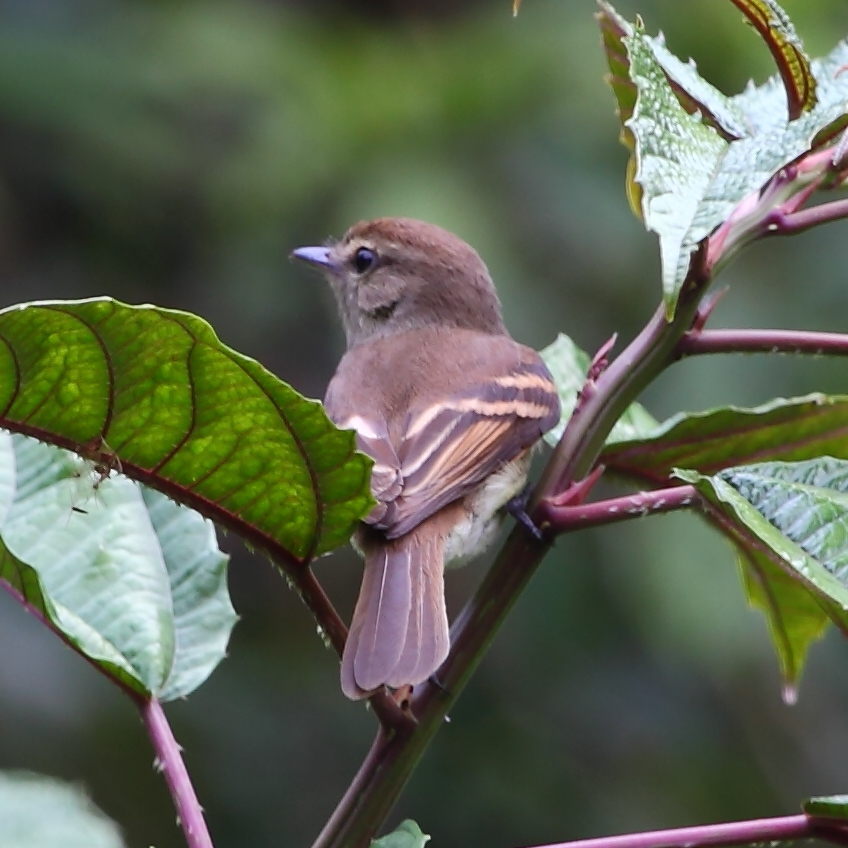
- Euler's flycatcher at Bertioga, São Paulo State, Brazil

Conservation status
- Least Concern (IUCN 3.1)

Scientific classification
- Kingdom: Animalia
- Phylum: Chordata
- Class: Aves
- Order: Passeriformes
- Family: Tyrannidae
- Genus: Lathrotriccus
- Species: L. euleri

Binomial name
- Lathrotriccus euleri (Cabanis, 1868)

Synonyms
- Empidochanes euleri; Empidonax euleri

= Euler's flycatcher =

Enferrujado

Species of bird

Euler's flycatcher (Lathrotriccus euleri) is a small passerine bird in the family Tyrannidae, the tyrant flycatchers. It is found on Trinidad and in every mainland South American country except Chile. It formerly was found on Grenada.

== Taxonomy and systematics ==
Euler's flycatcher has these five subspecies:

- L. e. flaviventris (Lawrence, 1887)
- L. e. lawrencei (Allen, JA, 1889)
- L. e. bolivianus (Allen, JA, 1889)
- L. e. argentinus (Cabanis, 1868)
- L. e. euleri (Cabanis, 1868)

Euler's flycatcher has a complicated taxonomic history. What are now the subspecies L. e. euleri and L. e. argentinus were originally described in the same 1868 publication as Empidochanes euleri and Empidochanes argentinus respectively. Subspecies L. e. flaviventris was originally described as Blaccicus flaviventris. Subspecies L. e. lawrencei was originally described as Ochthaeca flaviventris but later renamed Empidonax lawrencei. In the early 1900s genus Empidochanes was merged into Empidonax. Some early twentieth century authors treated the northern subspecies L. e. flaviventris, L. e. lawrencei, and L. e. bolivianus as the separate species "Lawrence's flycatcher" but by mid-century all five taxa were generally regarded as subspecies of L. euleri. The Clements taxonomy subdivides the species into the "Lawrence's" and "Euler's" groups in recognition that the earlier treatment as two species might be valid.

Many authors retained Euler's flycatcher in Empidonax through most of the twentieth century. By the very early twenty-first century it was generally agreed to properly belong to Lathrotriccus which had been erected in 1986. During the several reclassifications some subspecies received new specific epithets to comply with the principle of priority.

Euler's flycatcher is named for the Swiss ornithologist Carl Euler. It shares genus Lathrotriccus with the gray-breasted flycatcher (L. griseipectus).

== Description ==
Euler's flycatcher is 12.7 to 13.5 cm (5.0 to 5.3 in) long and weighs 9 to 13.8 g (0.32 to 0.49 oz). The sexes have the same plumage. Adults of the nominate subspecies L. e. euleri have a warm olive-brown crown, nape, and cheeks. They have a whitish eye-ring and a faint pale stripe above the lores. Their upperparts are mostly olive-brown with a brown rump. Their wings are dusky with pale buff ends on the coverts that show as two wing bars. Their secondaries and tertials have pale buffy-brown edges. Their tail is dusky. Their throat is grayish white, their breast is washed with brownish olive, and their belly is pale yellow to white.

The other subspecies of Euler's flycatcher differ from the nominate and each other thus:

- L. e. flaviventris: similar to nominate
- L. e. lawrencei: more olive upperparts than nominate, with whitish throat, drabber gray breast, and white belly
- L. e. bolivianus: more olive upperparts than nominate but less so than lawrencei with pale olive-gray breast and a slightly less yellow belly than nominate
- L. e. argentinus: drabber gray breast than nominate with whitish throat and white belly

All subspecies have a dark iris, a black maxilla, a dull pinkish or orangish pink mandible, and blackish brown legs and feet.

== Distribution and habitat ==
The subspecies of Euler's flycatcher are found thus:

- L. e. flaviventris: Grenada (possibly extinct)
- L. e. lawrencei: Colombia's Eastern Andes, Andes and Coastal Ranges of western and northern Venezuela, Trinidad, and locally in the Guianas
- L. e. bolivianus: Amazonas and Bolívar states in southern and eastern Venezuela south through eastern Ecuador and eastern Peru into northwestern Bolivia and east into much of Amazonian Brazil
- L. e. argentinus: central and eastern Bolivia, northern and northeastern Argentina, and Paraguay; in migration eastern Peru and eastern Brazil
- L. e. euleri: southeastern Brazil, northeastern Argentina, and Uruguay; in migration Peru, Bolivia, and Brazil

Euler's flycatcher inhabits moist to humid primary and secondary forest and woodlands in the tropical and lower subtropical zones. It favors the lower levels and edges of its habitat. In elevation it ranges from sea level to 1,500 m (4,900 ft) in Brazil. In Venezuela it is found below 1,600 m (5,200 ft) north of the Orinoco River and below 1,000 m (3,300 ft) south of it. It reaches 800 m (2,600 ft) in Colombia, 1,300 m (4,300 ft) in Ecuador, and 1,600 m (5,200 ft) in Peru.

== Behavior ==
=== Movement ===
Most populations of Euler's flycatcher are year-round residents. Subspecies L. e. argentinus and the more southerly individuals of L. e. euleri move north for the austral winter into Peru and Brazil and perhaps as far as Venezuela. The species' migration timing, routes, and extent are barely known.

=== Feeding ===
Euler's flycatcher feeds on arthropods. It typically forages singly or in pairs and rarely to occasionally joins mixed-species feeding flocks. It perches upright in low vegetation, usually somewhat hidden, and captures prey in mid-air with sallies from the perch ("hawking"). It returns to the same perch or another one about equally.

=== Breeding ===
The breeding season of Euler's flycatcher varies geographically, spanning May to July on Trinidad, September to November in Brazil, and October to as late as January in Argentina. Its nest is an open cup made from plant fibers and lined with soft black fibers, built in a branch fork or perched on the edge of a hole in a trunk. It typically is placed within about 2 m (7 ft) of the ground but may be higher. The clutch is two or three eggs. They are white, marked with reddish brown mostly at the larger end, and in a study in Argentina weighed about 1.7 g (0.060 oz) and measured roughly 18 mm × 13.5 mm (0.71 in × 0.53 in). In that study only the female incubated, for 16 to 18 days, and fledging occurred about 15 days after hatch. Both parents provisioned the nestlings. In the study area predation was found to be moderate to light.

=== Vocalization ===
In Brazil Euler's flycatcher sings a "varied series of 2-5 notes, 1st one normally stressed and slightly longer than slightly descending notes; thereafter Tjeew-tjuh or Tjeew-terduh". In Venezuela its song is described as "an abrupt, almost explosive FEEU! pe'pe 'pe'p'p, 1st note loudest, last notes run together, buzzy and downscale". In Peru it is described as "a repeated, 2-note, buzzy, descending DZEER-hur (hur sometimes lacking) interspersed with sneezing DZEER-wee'chew phrases". There its call is "a buzzy, descending series of 2-7, usually 4, notes DZEE-dzee-dzee-dzer or DZEEW-dzew-dzew-dzeer".

== Status ==
The IUCN has assessed Euler's flycatcher as being of Last Concern. It has an extremely large range; its population size is not known and is believed to be decreasing. No immediate threats have been identified. However, subspecies L. e. flaviventris has not been recorded since 1950 and is possibly extinct. It is considered "uncommon to locally fairly common" in Venezuela, "rather uncommon and possibly seasonal" in Colombia, "scarce and local" in Ecuador, and "uncommon but widespread" in Peru. The species is found in many protected areas across its range.
