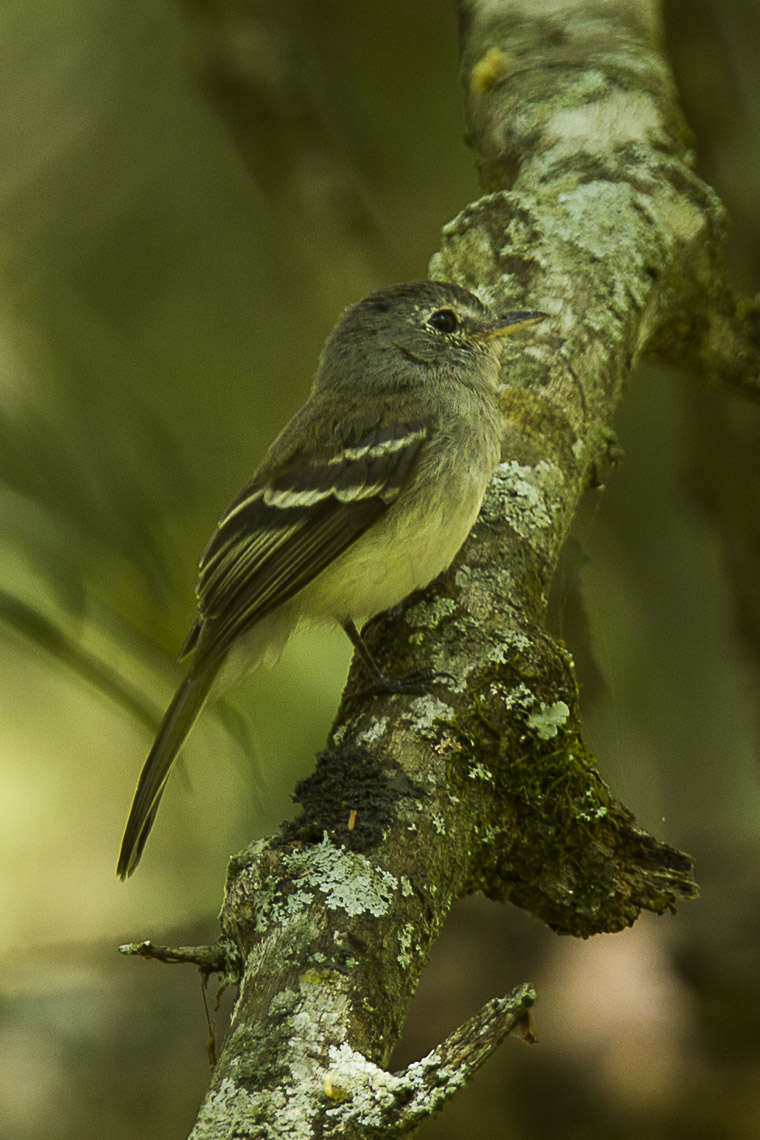

Conservation status
- Least Concern (IUCN 3.1)

Scientific classification
- Kingdom: Animalia
- Phylum: Chordata
- Class: Aves
- Order: Passeriformes
- Family: Tyrannidae
- Genus: Lathrotriccus
- Species: L. griseipectus

Binomial name
- Lathrotriccus griseipectus (Lawrence, 1869)

= Grey-breasted flycatcher =

Species of bird

The grey-breasted flycatcher (Lathrotriccus griseipectus) is a species of bird in the family Tyrannidae, the tyrant flycatchers. It is found in Ecuador and Peru.

== Taxonomy and systematics ==
The grey-breasted flycatcher was originally described as Empidonax griseipectus. Many authors retained it in Empidonax through most of the twentieth century. By the very early twenty-first century it was generally agreed to properly belong to Lathrotriccus which had been erected in 1986.

The grey-breasted flycatcher is monotypic. It shares genus Lathrotriccus with Euler's flycatcher (L. euleri).

== Description ==
The grey-breasted flycatcher is about 13 cm (5.1 in) long and weighs about 11 g (0.39 oz). The sexes have the same plumage. Adults have a gray crown, nape, and cheeks. They have a whitish broken eye-ring and a faint whitish stripe above the lores. Their upperparts are gray with a tinge of brown or olive. Their wings are dusky with whitish ends on the coverts that show as two wing bars. Their secondaries and tertials have whitish edges. Their tail is dusky. Their throat is grayish white, their breast is washed with a darker gray, and their belly is white to whitish with a pale yellow tinge. They have a dark iris, a black maxilla, a pale orange-yellow mandible, and blackish brown legs and feet.

== Distribution and habitat ==
The grey-breasted flycatcher has a disjunct distribution. It is found intermittently along the western slope of the Andes from central Esmeraldas Province in Ecuador south into northern Peru as far as northern Piura Department. It is also found on the eastern Andean slope in Peru in the valleys of the Chinchipe and Marañón rivers, respectively in eastern Piura and northern Cajamarca Department. The species apparently previously had a larger range. It inhabits the lower levels of humid and deciduous forest and woodland and especially favors viny tangles. In elevation it occurs from sea level to mostly below 800 m (2,600 ft) but reaches 1,700 m (5,600 ft) in Ecuador and 1,200 m (3,900 ft) in Peru.

== Behavior ==
=== Movement ===
The grey-breasted flycatcher is believed to make some seasonal movements to wetter parts of its range during the dry season.

=== Feeding ===
The grey-breasted flycatcher feeds on insects. It typically forages singly or in pairs. It perches upright, somewhat hidden in denser vegetation like vine tangles and shrubbery at the sunny edge of gaps in the forest, and typically up to about 4 m (13 ft) above the ground. It captures prey in mid-air with sallies from the perch ("hawking"). It has been observed attending swarms of army ants but seldom joins mixed-species feeding flocks.

=== Breeding ===
The grey-breasted flycatcher's breeding season includes February but its full season has not been defined. Its nest is an open cup made from dead leaves and bark lined with softer plant fibers and fungal rhizomorphs. Two nests were respectively 1 and 4 m (3 and 13 ft) above the ground; one was in a shallow cavity in a tree and the other in a clump of epiphytes. Both contained two eggs which were pale beige with cinnamon and orange-brown spots. At the one nest observed throughout, the incubation period was 16 days and fledging occurred 14 days after hatch. One adult incubated the clutch and both provisioned the nestlings.

=== Vocalization ===
One description of the grey-breasted flycatcher's song is "a slightly descending series of burry notes, zhwee-zhwe-zhwe-zhwe" and of its call "a simpler Zhwee-buu". Another description of the song is "a repeated, buzzy DZEE-heer...DZEE-dzureet?" and of its call a "phrase of descending raspy notes: DZEER-dzee".

== Status ==
The IUCN originally in 1988 assessed the grey-breasted flycatcher as Threatened, then in 1994 as Vulnerable, and since May 2024 as being of Least Concern. It has a large overall range but is found only locally within it. Its estimated population of between 10,000 and 20,000 mature individuals is believed to be decreasing. "Disturbance and degradation through grazing by goats and cattle pose the most significant threat to the understorey of deciduous forests. Even protected areas are affected by illegal settling, logging and livestock-grazing. Uncontrolled fires started to clear land for agriculture or to improve pastures for grazing are a major threat in parts of the range." It is considered local in Ecuador and rare to uncommon in Peru. It does occur in several protected areas but "[f]urther conservation efforts within protected areas and research aimed at establishing a better understanding of this species' distribution, ecology and movements are recommended".
