= Intelexit =

Human rights advocacy project

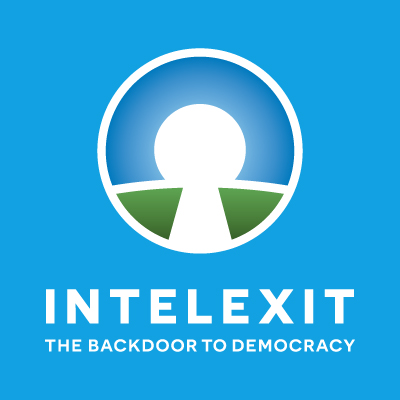
- Formation: 2015
- Purpose: Politics, human rights, advocacy
- Location: Berlin, Germany
- Website: intelexit at pen.gg

Intelexit is an international project that helps intelligence officers to exit their organisations because of ethical or psychological reasons. It is a project from the Peng Collective, usually known for subversive campaigning and tactical media and was launched on September 28, 2015.

== Outreach activities ==
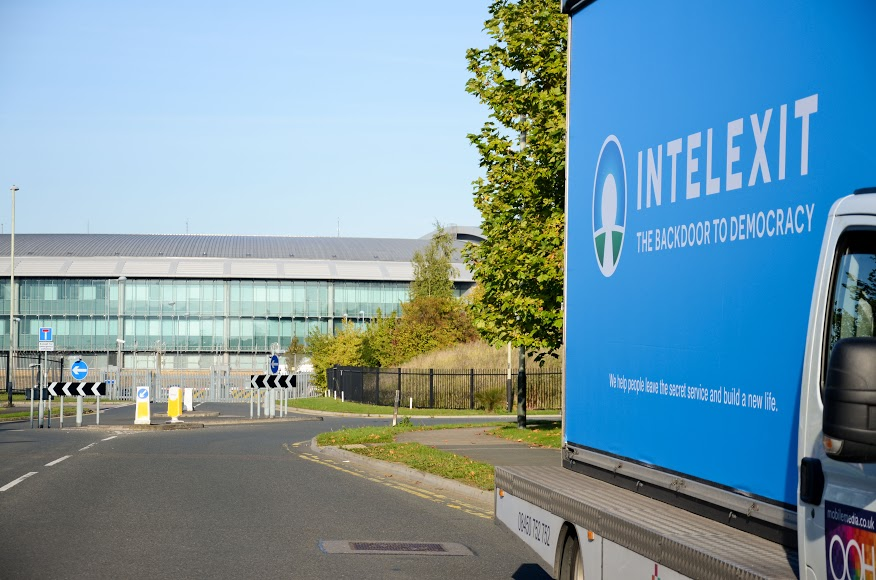
The Intelexit truck parked in front of the GCHQ in Cheltenham, UK

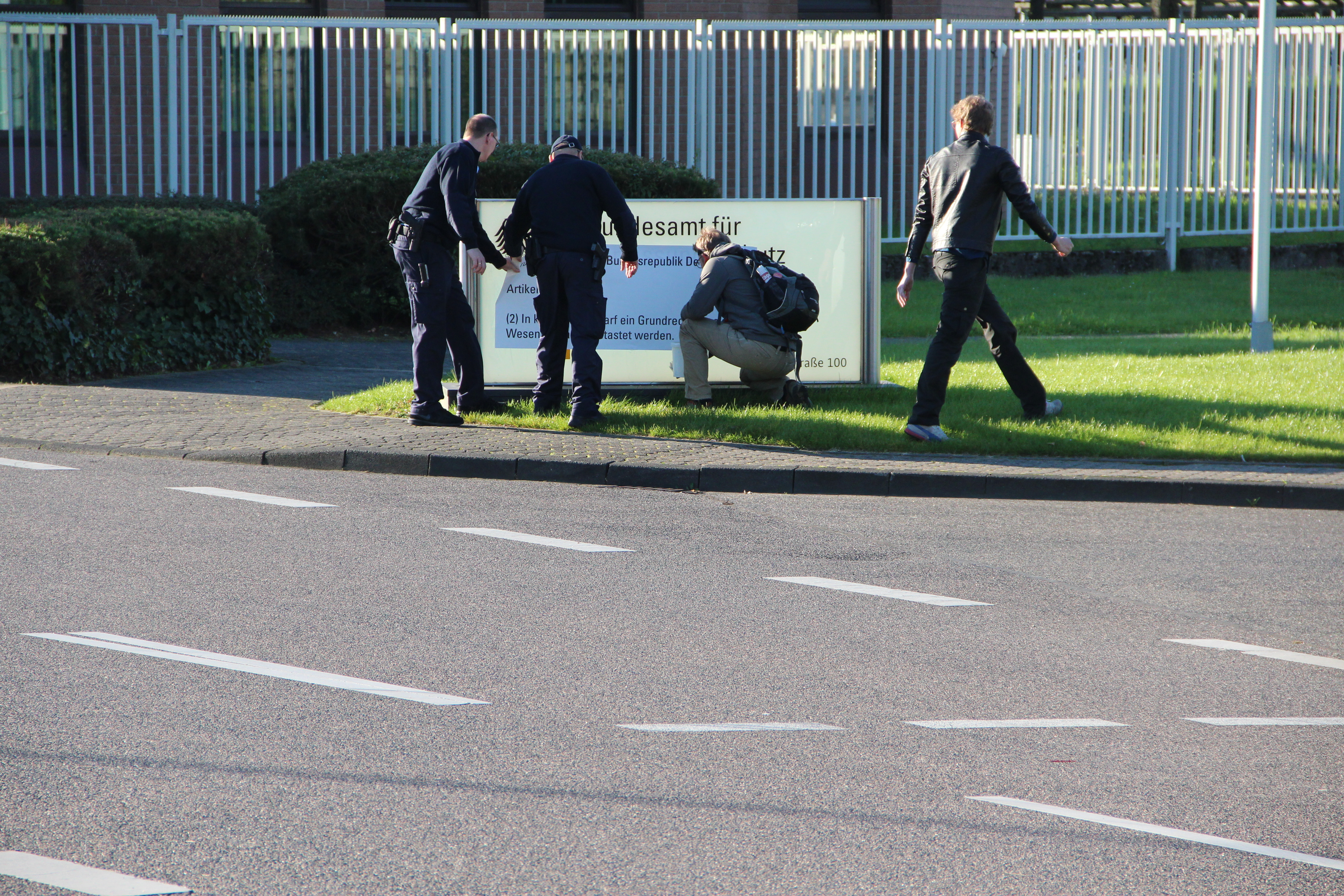
Verfassungsschutz Employees tearing off the Constitution from their building in Cologne

To reach the target group of intelligence officers and subcontractors, the organisations launched their campaign with a website offering details about ethics and procedure to exit secret services and an automatically generated resignation form. The security expert Bruce Schneier and Thomas Drake support the campaign in their advertisement video.

As part of an international advertisement campaign involving advertisement trucks in front of the NSA building at Fort Meade, USA, and one of the NSA contractor's favourite lunch places Cafe Joe's, in front of the GCHQ in the UK and the Dagger Complex, the Lucius D. Clay Kaserne, the US Embassy and the Federal Intelligence Service buildings in Berlin, Germany. They distributed leaflets in front of several buildings at the same time, being sent away from GCHQ in the UK by security guards. In Germany, they wheat pasted a part of the German constitution at the building of the German Federal Office for the Protection of the Constitution and documented how the employees tore it off.

Intelexit also performed an airborne leaflet operation over the Dagger Complex with a drone advertising for the exit program.

== Positions ==
One of the spokespersons, Jérémie Zimmermann claims that the organisation "speaks to employees who are unsatisfied in their jobs, due to moral conflicts, and encourages them to consider termination of employment as an act of personal strength and a contribution to democracy." “We know for a fact that there are many, many people working there who are conflicted, anxious and ultimately completely against what these agencies are doing,” says Ariel Fisher, another press officer of the organisation.

As described at the press conference, the organisation is not advocating for whistleblowers but to support the individuals in their courage to overcome ethical and psychological pain. It is not just an ethical standpoint against mass surveillance, war crimes conducted by secret services or local misuse of secret structures like the German case of the Nazi Terror group NSU that was backed up by the German internal intelligence.

== Campaign material and resources ==
A brochure is available to distribute to the personnel of spy agencies, photographs of previous actions, a press kit and other documents are available for reuse.
