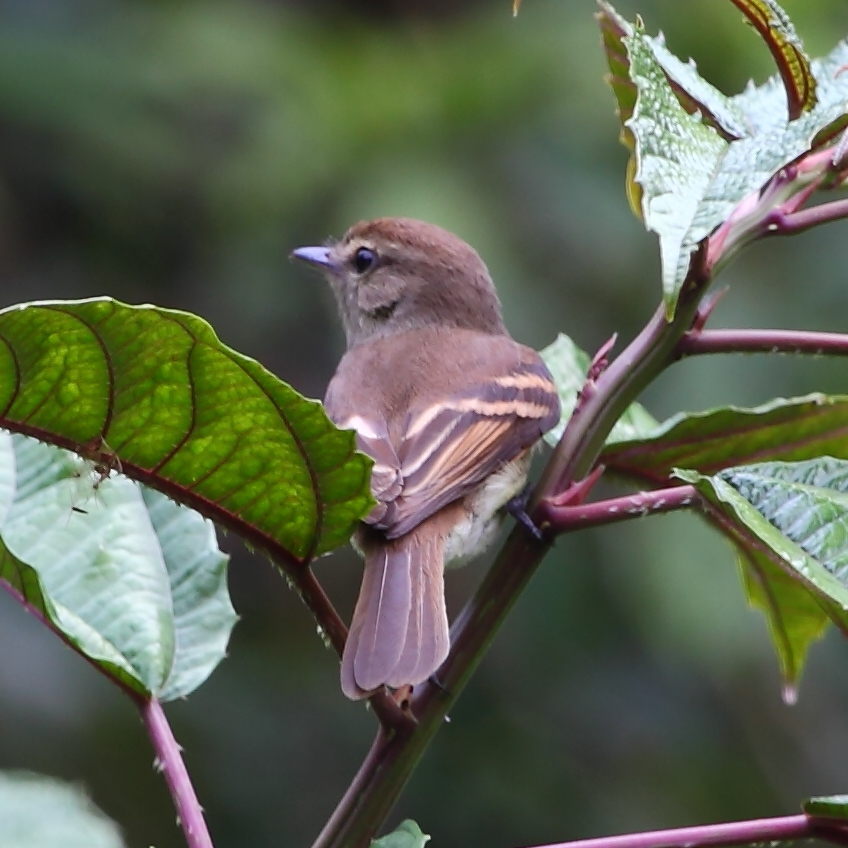
- Euler's flycatcher (Lathrotriccus euleri)

Scientific classification
- Kingdom: Animalia
- Phylum: Chordata
- Class: Aves
- Order: Passeriformes
- Family: Tyrannidae
- Genus: Lathrotriccus; Lanyon, W & Lanyon, S, 1986

Species
- L. euleri L. griseipectus

= Lathrotriccus =

Genus of birds

Lathrotriccus is a small genus of passerine birds in the tyrant flycatcher family. They breed in tropical South America, including, for one species, the islands of Trinidad and formerly also Grenada.

They closely resembles the Empidonax flycatchers in appearance, and were formerly placed in that genus, but differ anatomically and biochemically.

There are only two species in the genus:

Image	Scientific name	Common name	Distribution
	Euler's flycatcher	Lathrotriccus euleri	Colombia and Venezuela south to Bolivia and Argentina, and on the islands of Trinidad and formerly also Grenada
	Grey-breasted flycatcher	Lathrotriccus griseipectus	western Ecuador and northwestern Peru.

These are birds of fairly open habitats such as open woods and arid scrub. They are inconspicuous birds, tending to keep to undergrowth perches from which they sally forth to catch insects.
