= Oiler =

Oiler may refer to:

== Ships ==
- Replenishment oiler, a naval auxiliary ship with fuel tanks and dry cargo holds which can supply both fuel and dry stores to other ships during underway replenishment at sea
- Oil tanker, a ship designed for the bulk transport of oil or its products

== Sports ==
- Cape Breton Oilers, a former American Hockey League team
- City Oilers, Ugandan basketball team
- Edmonton Oilers, a National Hockey League team based in Edmonton, Alberta, Canada
- Esport Oilers, a Finnish F-liiga floorball team
- Houston Oilers, a former National Football League team, now the Tennessee Titans
- Southern District Oilers, a division 1 American football team based in Adelaide, Australia
- Stavanger Oilers, an ice hockey team based in Stavanger, Norway
- Tulsa Oilers, an ECHL ice hockey team based in Tulsa, Oklahoma, United States

== Other ==
- Oil can, a can that holds oil for lubricating machines
- Oiler (occupation), a worker whose main job is to oil machinery
- Oiler (Transformers), a fictional Transformers character
- The Oiler, a character in the 1897 short story "The Open Boat" by Stephen Crane
- Slang for diesel engine

== See also ==
- Euler (disambiguation)
