= Griesheim Airport =

Former airport in Griesheim, Germany

Griesheim Airport Fliegerhorst Darmstadt-Griesheim
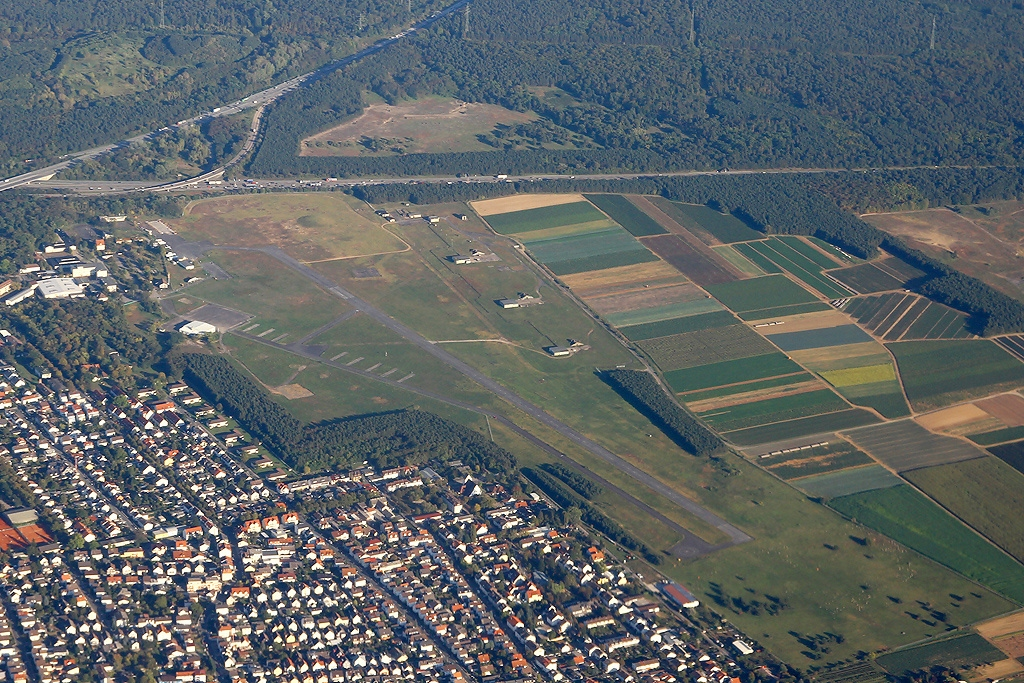
- Griesheim Airport in 2011
- IATA: ZCS; ICAO: EDES

Summary
- Airport type: Private
- Operator: Technische Universität Darmstadt
- Location: Griesheim, Germany
- Elevation AMSL: 525 ft / 160 m
- Coordinates: 49°51′15″N 08°35′19″E

Map

Runways
Direction	Length		Surface
Direction	m	ft	Surface
07/25	1,688	5,571	Asphalt

Griesheim Airport (IATA: ZCS, ICAO: EDES) is a private airfield in Germany, located 1-mile (1.6 km) southwest of Griesheim (Hessen); approximately 270 miles (430 km) southwest of Berlin.

Formerly a NATO military airfield, it was closed in 1992. In 1996, a large part of the airfield site was placed under the control of Technische Universität Darmstadt, where a variety of disciplines carry out experiments and operate several small aircraft.

Griesheim was originally part of an Imperial German Army (Reichsheer) military artillery firing range in 1874, an airfield was established on the site in 1908, being Germany's first airfield and flight school. During World War I it was used as a Prisoner of War Camp. Re-established as an airfield in 1930, the German Research Institute for Gliding was established on the site. After 1939, the Luftwaffe established a military presence at the airfield, and after World War II, it was a United States Army Airfield (Darmstadt Army Airfield) until the end of the Cold War, jointly used in the late 1980s as civil airport for light aircraft and sailplanes (Griesheim Airport).

== History ==
=== Origins ===
In 1874, the area south of Griesheim was established as a German Army artillery firing range. In 1908, August Euler recognized the suitability of the site as an airfield, and conducted the first glider flights at the location of the current airfield in December 1908. Afterward, he presented to the German government a request to lease a portion of the site (380 acres) for use as an airfield. Early in 1909 the lease was completed. In February, Euler erected a building on the site, which he relocated from Mainz castle, costing him 2,400 Marks. In that building he began aircraft production. On 31 December 1909, he earned the first civil pilot's license in Germany. Between 1909 and 1911 in Griesheim Euler trained 74 pilots. The most famous student pilot was Prince Henry of Prussia, the brother of the German Emperor, Wilhelm II.

In 1913 the airfield was designated "Flying station Darmstadt-Griesheim" and was taken over by the German Army. During World War I, the airfield was turned into a Prisoner of War Camp, eventually holding over 15,000 soldiers. At the end of the war, the Treaty of Versailles prohibited German military flying, and the French Army moved into the area for occupation duty. The occupying force remained until 1930 when the French military withdrew.

After the withdrawal of the French in June 1930 the airfield was re-established. In April 1932 the city of Darmstadt, leased the approximately 70-acre (28 ha) airfield for their new airport. In May 1933 the German Research Institute for Gliding (DFS) moved their institution into the barracks at the airport formerly used by the French.

The DFS was a civilian facility. During the 1930s its mission was primarily to research gliders and their uses. The Institute established research facility hangars, workshops, and in 1936 a wind tunnel, which is used today by the Technische Universität Darmstadt. Up to 780 employees were employed at the DFS, including the staff of the Engineering School of Aeronautical Engineering (IfL). By October 1937, the entire facility along with the airfield had expanded to about 800 hectares.

=== Luftwaffe Use ===
When World War II broke out in 1939, DFS was moved north to Braunschweig in Lower Saxony and then to Ainring in Upper Bavaria. The German Air Force (Luftwaffe) then established itself at the airfield. During its use by the Luftwaffe, the airport was known as "Fliegerhorst Darmstadt-Griesheim", and was generally used by Fighter units.

The first combat unit assigned was Zerstörergeschwader 2 (ZG 2) in April 1940, being equipped with the Messerschmitt Bf 110C heavy fighter. The unit took part in the Battle of France from May–June 1940. On 4 May the French and British Air Forces launched a series of desperate attacks against the bridges around Sedan at a heavy cost. ZG 2 helped provide air cover. In July with the battle won ZG 2 moved into France.

Jagdgeschwader 3 (JG 3), a Messerschmitt Bf 109E fighter unit moved to Darmstadt-Griesheim in late February 1941 after taking severe losses during the Battle of Britain. At the field the unit was rearmed, and additional pilots were assigned. In early May, the unit moved east into Poland for eventual action against the Soviet Union during Operation Barbarossa.

Darmstadt-Griesheim became a key base in late 1944 as part of the "Defense of the Reich" campaign against United States Army Air Forces (USAAF) Eighth Air Force heavy bombing raids against targets in Germany. No less than two fighter units, Jagdgeschwader 53 (JG 53) and Jagdgeschwader 4 (JG 4), equipped with Focke-Wulf Fw 190A and a few Messerschmitt Bf 109E fighters used for day interceptor missions against the American bomber fleets. A third unit, Nachtjagdgeschwader 11 (NJG 11), flew Fw 190s and Bf 109s as night interceptors against Avro Lancaster bombers of RAF Bomber Command attacking at night.

Beginning in mid-to-late 1944, after the Allies landed in Normandy and began to move east into central France, Darmstadt-Griesheim came into the effective range of USAAF Ninth Air Force Martin B-26 Marauder medium bombers and Republic P-47 Thunderbolts. The airfield came under more and more frequent attack by the American mediums and tactical fighter bombers, mostly with 500-pound general-purpose bombs; unguided rockets and .50 caliber machine gun sweeps when Eighth Air Force heavy bombers (Boeing B-17 Flying Fortresses, Consolidated B-24 Liberators) were within interception range of the Luftwaffe aircraft assigned to the base. The attacks were timed to have the maximum effect possible to keep the interceptors pinned down on the ground and be unable to attack the heavy bombers. Also the North American P-51 Mustang fighter-escort groups of the Eighth Air Force would drop down on their return to England and attack the base with a fighter sweep and attack any target of opportunity to be found at the airfield.

=== Wartime American Use ===
United States Army units began to move into the Darmstadt area in mid-March 1945, and elements of the Third United States Army captured Darmstadt-Griesheim airfield about 25 March. Combat engineers from IX Engineer command moved in with the 832d, 850th, and 826th Engineering Aviation Battalions arriving on 27 March 1945, to repair the runway for use by combat aircraft. The engineers bulldozed soil into the bombed runway and laid down Pierced Steel Planking over the damaged runway to make it operational for use. The engineers also performed minimal repairs to the facility to make it operational. On 28 March, the airfield was declared ready for Allied use and was designated as Advanced Landing Ground "Y-76 Darmstadt/Griesheim ". Almost immediately, C-47 Skytrain transports began using the new airfield to fly in supplies and munitions to the ground units, and evacuate combat casualties to the rear areas and was also used by the 72d Liaison Squadron, flying light observation and courier aircraft.

After the combat ended in May, Griesheim Airfield was redesignated Army Air Force Station Darmstadt/Griesheim and became the home of several command and control organizations. Headquarters, 63d Fighter Wing; 64th Fighter Wing, and 71st Fighter Wing used the airfield between July and November 1945. In addition, Air Technical Service Command used the airfield as a storage depot for captured Luftwaffe aircraft prior to them being destroyed or some being transferred back to the United States. It was closed by the USAAF in October 1945.

=== Postwar occupation ===
With the Air Force units moved out, the airfield became part of the United States Army forces in Darmstadt, and the airfield was renamed Darmstadt Army Airfield. Over the years, Darmstadt served as home for thousands of American soldiers and their families. The Airfield was home to the following units:

- 1959, V Corps Artillery. Aviation units of V Corps and 7th Army also use the field. Aircraft based at the airfield included: H-13s, H-19s, L19s and L20s.
- 1965, Btry F, 26th Arty (the V Corps artillery aviation battery); 4th Pltn, 421st Med Air Abm Co (a medical evacuation unit); Air Section, HQ 10th Arty Gp
- 1989, 14 US Army medical helicopters (Sikorsky UH-60 Blackhawks) of the 159th Medical Co (Air Ambulance)

In addition to the military mission, a civilian American flying club was located at the airfield in 1989 – the Darmstadt Flying Club. The club had 200 members (the vast majority are US servicemembers) who flew five Cessna 152 trainers and two Cessna 172's. (The club was originally located in Hanau but moved to Griesheim in 1986.)

U.S. Army Garrison Darmstadt officially ended six decades of service at its inactivation ceremony 5 August 2008.

Today, many wartime relics can be found at Griesheim Airport. Restrictions on U.S. Army aviation imposed in 1947 by the establishment of the United States Air Force meant that Army aviation units assigned to the airfield were limited to helicopter and light courier and liaison aircraft. Although the Army removed the wartime runway and laid down a new asphalt one, many of the wartime taxiways and aircraft dispersal hardstands remain on the airfield today. A large German hangar was repaired and remained in use until the aviation units were withdrawn in 1993. The support area of the airfield, contains several buildings used by the German Research Institute for Gliding, including the wind-tunnel. Several wartime-era barracks were renovated and kept in good repair over the years as well.

== See also ==
- Technische Universität Darmstadt
