= Carl Euler =

Swiss farmer and ornithologist

Carl Hieronymus Euler (1834 – 27 November 1901) was a Swiss farmer and ornithologist who worked in Brazil.

Euler was born in Basel, Switzerland. In 1853 he travelled to Rio de Janeiro and married a widow, Madeleine Guerrini-Girrard (1822–1904), who owned a large farm near Cantagalo. He also became Swiss vice-consul, and in his spare time collected birds and studied their habits. His findings were published in the Journal für Ornithologie between 1867 and 1893. He sent his specimens to the Museum für Naturkunde in Berlin, where Jean Cabanis named Euler's flycatcher (Lathrotriccus euleri) after him, and to the National Museum of Brazil. He died in Rio de Janeiro on 27 November 1901.
