= Griesheim, Hesse =

Griesheim
- Town
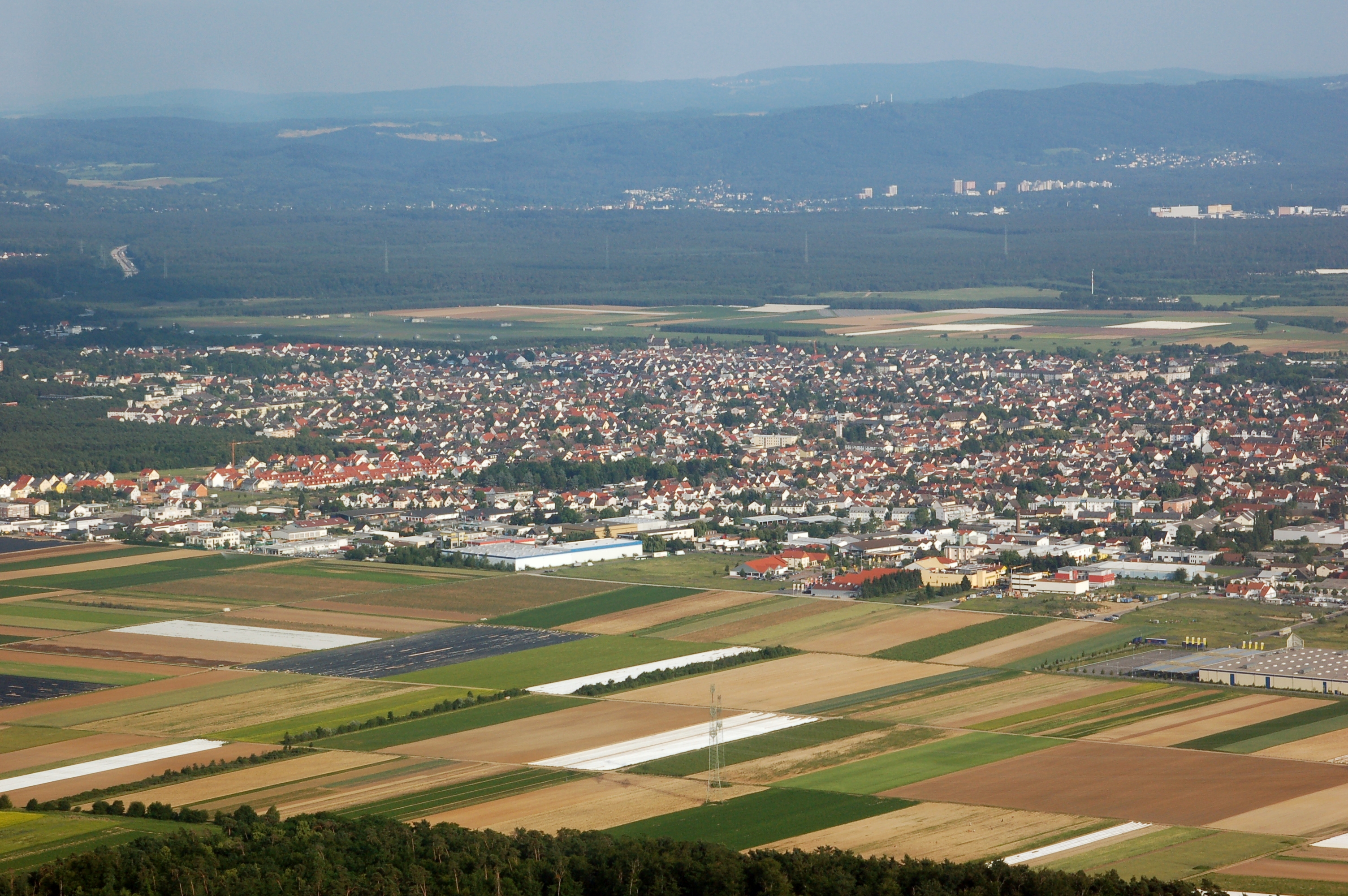
- Aerial view

- Coat of arms

- Location of Griesheim within Darmstadt-Dieburg district
- Interactive map of Griesheim
- Location within Germany Location within Hesse
- Coordinates: 49°51′50″N 8°33′50″E
- Country: Germany
- State: Hesse
- Admin. region: Darmstadt
- District: Darmstadt-Dieburg

Government
  - Mayor (2022–28): Geza Krebs-Wetzl (CDU)

Area
  - Total: 21.55 km^{2} (8.32 sq mi)
- Elevation: 96 m (315 ft)

Population (2025-12-31)
  - Total: 29,385
  - Density: 1,364/km^{2} (3,532/sq mi)
- Time zone: UTC+01:00 (CET)
  - Summer (DST): UTC+02:00 (CEST)
- Postal codes: 64347
- Dialling codes: 06155
- Vehicle registration: DA
- Website: www.griesheim.de

Griesheim (German pronunciation: [ˈɡʁiːsˌhaɪm]) is the largest town of the district Darmstadt-Dieburg in southern Hesse, Germany. It has just over 28,000 inhabitants as of December 2023.

Griesheim is known for being the location of the first German airfield, which was founded in 1908. More recently, in 2013, news of the Dagger Complex–which emerged as the most important of the NSA's headquarters in Europe in the wake of the global surveillance disclosures–brought Griesheim worldwide attention.

The town of Griesheim is also known in the region as "Onion City," a reference to the statue of the Zwiebelfrau ("Onion Woman") in the market square.

== Geography ==
Griesheim is located in the Hessian Ried between the Urneckar in the west and the Darmstadt Westwald forest area in the east. The urban area is mostly flat, and much of the territory is intensively used for agriculture.

=== Neighbouring communities ===
Griesheim is just west of the independent city of Darmstadt. To the north of Griesheim lies the town of Weiterstadt and to the south the town of Pfungstadt, both of which belong to the Darmstadt-Dieburg district as well. Griesheim is also bordered by the Groß-Gerau district to the northwest, with the towns of Riedstadt to the west, Groß-Gerau to the northwest, and Büttelborn to the north. .

== History ==
Griesheim, although inhabited since around 4500 BCE, first appeared in historical records only in 1165 CE. The arrival of the Protestant Reformation in 1529 marked an important religious turning point for the town.

Throughout its history, wine production played a significant role in the town's economy. However, the devastating impact of the Thirty Years' War heavily affected Griesheim, almost bringing the town to extinction. Many residents sought refuge within the walls of Darmstadt, where they faced the outbreak of plague. Only 37 individuals managed to rebuild the community following the war's end in 1648.

In 1874, an artillery range was established in the southwest part of Griesheim. In 1908, August Euler opened the first airfield in Germany, known as Griesheim Airport.

From 1918 to 1930, Griesheim was under French occupation, and the city suffered significant damage during World War II, with 65% of its buildings destroyed. After the war, Griesheim provided shelter for approximately 4,000 refugees. Following successful reconstruction, the Hessian state government granted Griesheim township rights on September 12, 1965.

Farming remains an important aspect of Griesheim's economy. The city is home to a local history and culture museum, showcasing archaeological artifacts and documenting its historical connection to St. Stephen. The museum also houses archaeological exhibits.

Since 1977, the Griesheimer Zwiebelmarkt (Onion Market) has been held annually in late September. It attracts visitors to the city center between Wagenhalle and Hans-Karl-Platz.

Throughout its history, the area of Griesheim has been part of various territories and administrative units, including:

- before 1479 until 1805: Holy Roman Empire, first within the County of Katzenelnbogen, followed by the Landgraviate of Hesse (by inheritance) and the Landgraviate of Hesse-Darmstadt.
- from 1806 to 1871: Grand Duchy of Hesse, primarily under the Principality of Starkenburg
- from 1871 to 1918: German Empire, Grand Duchy of Hesse, province of Starkenburg, District of Darmstadt
- from 1918 to 1938: German Empire (Weimar Republic), People's State of Hesse, province of Starkenburg, District of Darmstadt
- from 1938 to 1945: German Reich, People's State of Hesse, District of Darmstadt
- from 1945 to 1949: American occupation zone, Greater Hesse (1946: State of Hesse), Darmstadt administrative district, Darmstadt district
- from 1949 to 1977: Federal Republic of Germany, State of Hesse, Administrative District of Darmstadt, District of Darmstadt
- from 1977: Federal Republic of Germany, State of Hesse, Administrative District of Darmstadt, District of Darmstadt-Dieburg

== Transportation ==
=== Trams and buses ===
Lines 4, 9 and 10 of the Darmstadt tram network connect Griesheim to central Darmstadt. Bus lines 45 and 46 go from Griesheim to Riedstadt, Groß-Gerau and Trebur.

=== Roads ===
The main road passing west–east is the Bundesstraße 26, or B26. Griesheim is situated just west of the Darmstädter Kreuz interchange where the Bundesautobahn 5 and Bundesautobahn 67 cross.

== Twin towns – sister cities ==
Griesheim is twinned with:

- Bar-le-Duc, France (1975)
- Gyönk, Hungary (1990)
- Pontassieve, Italy (2008)

Since 1990, Griesheim also has a town friendship with Wilkau-Haßlau in Germany.

== Gallery ==
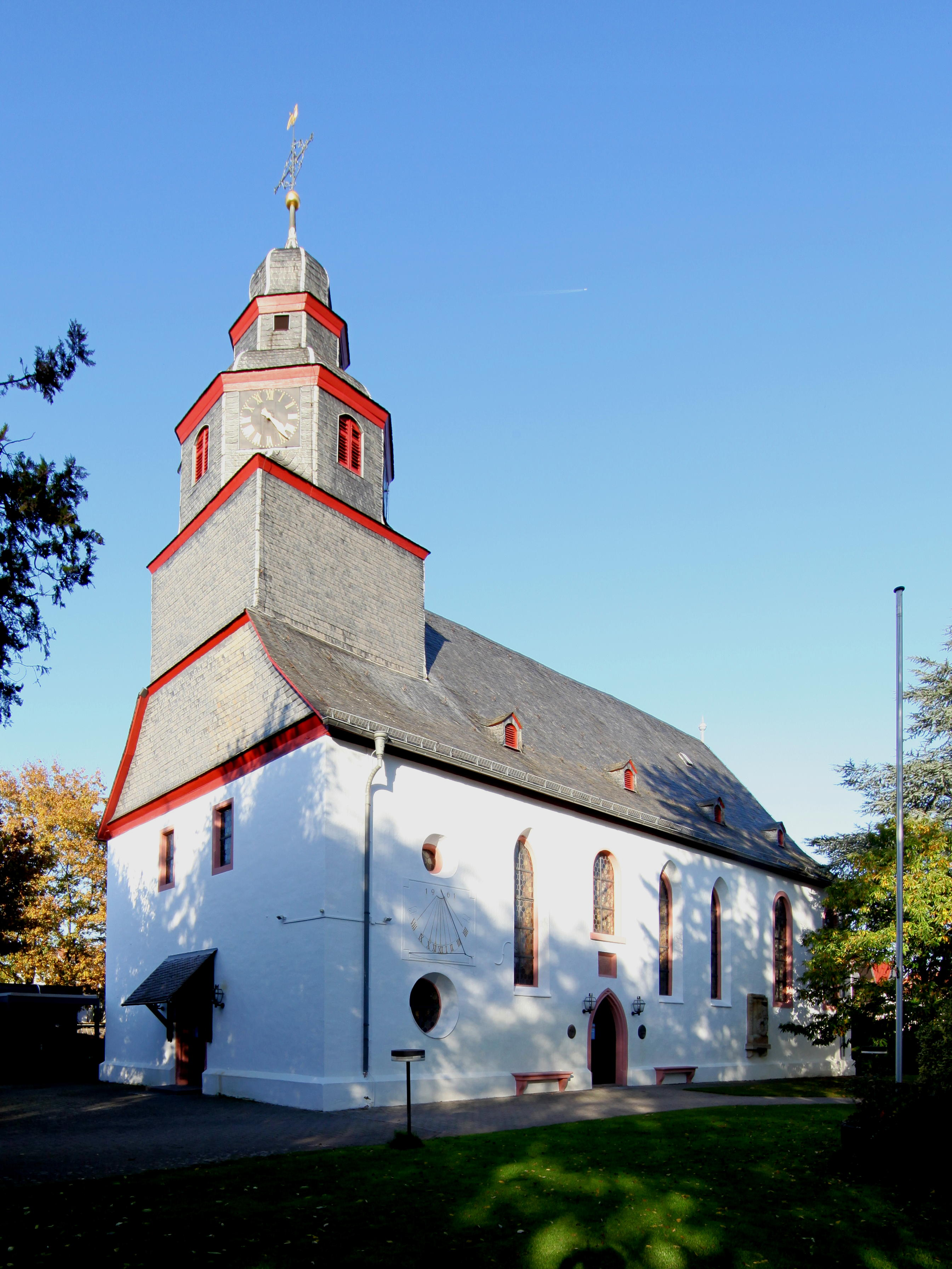
Protestant church Lutherkirche

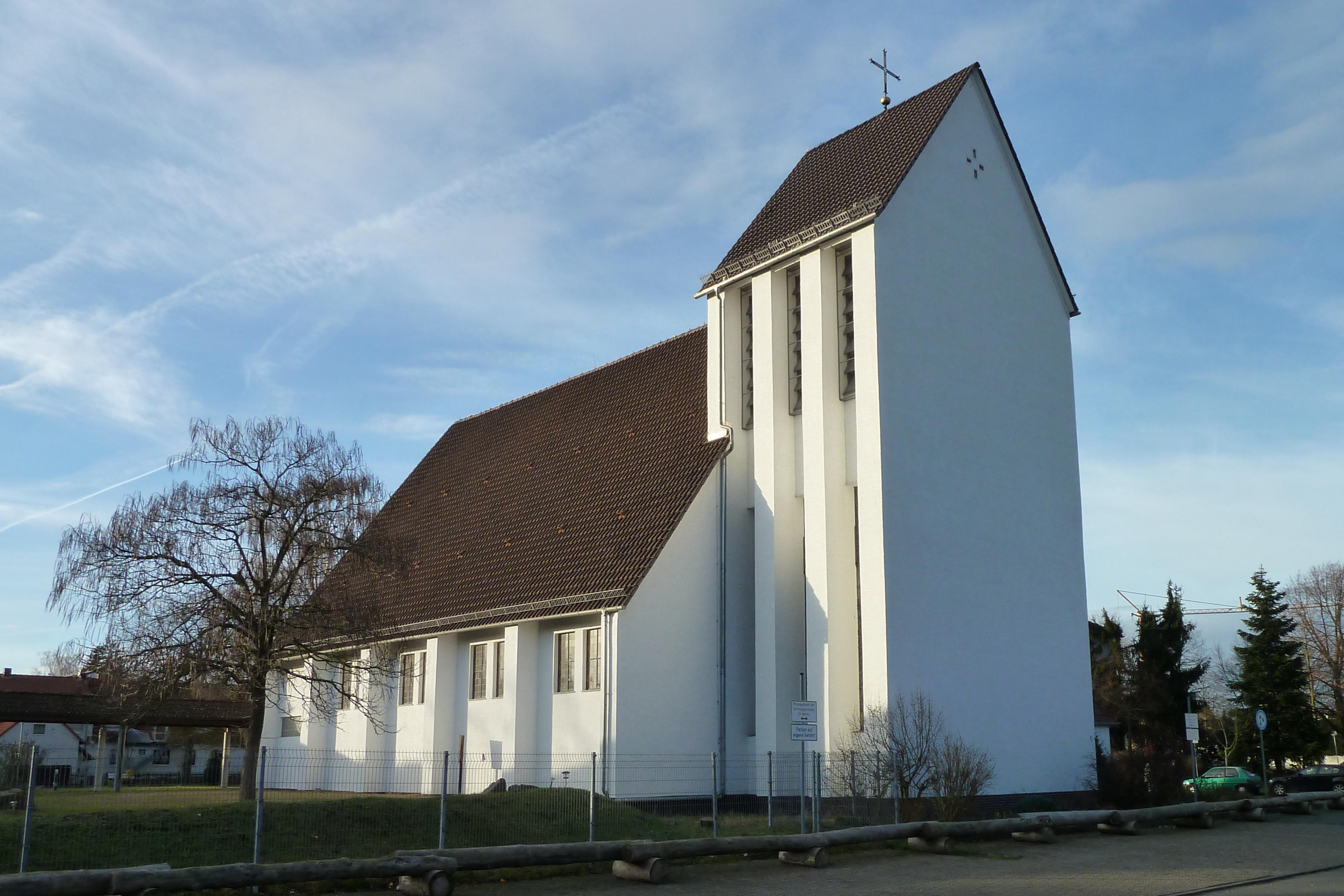
Catholic Church St. Stephan

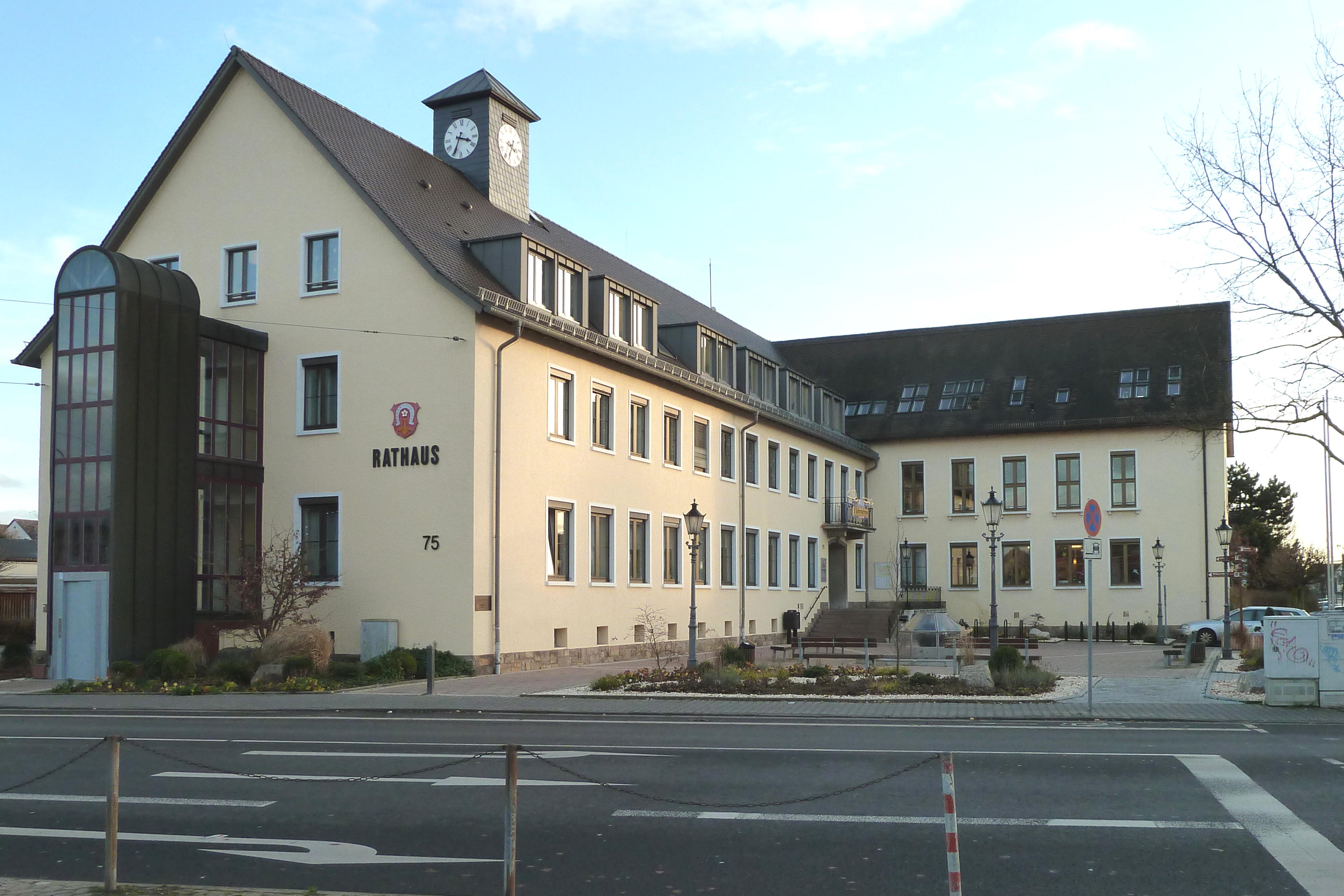
Town hall

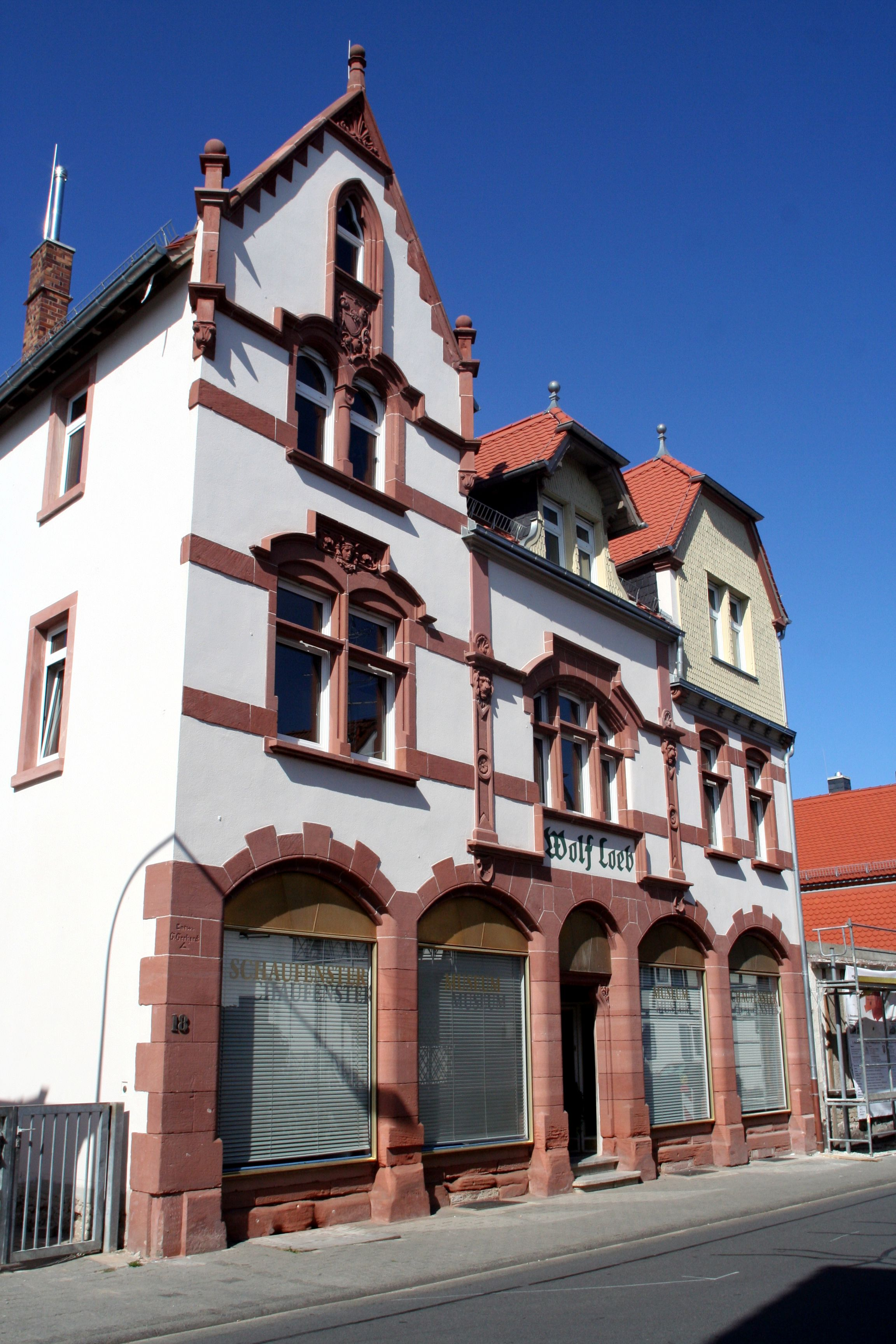
Museum

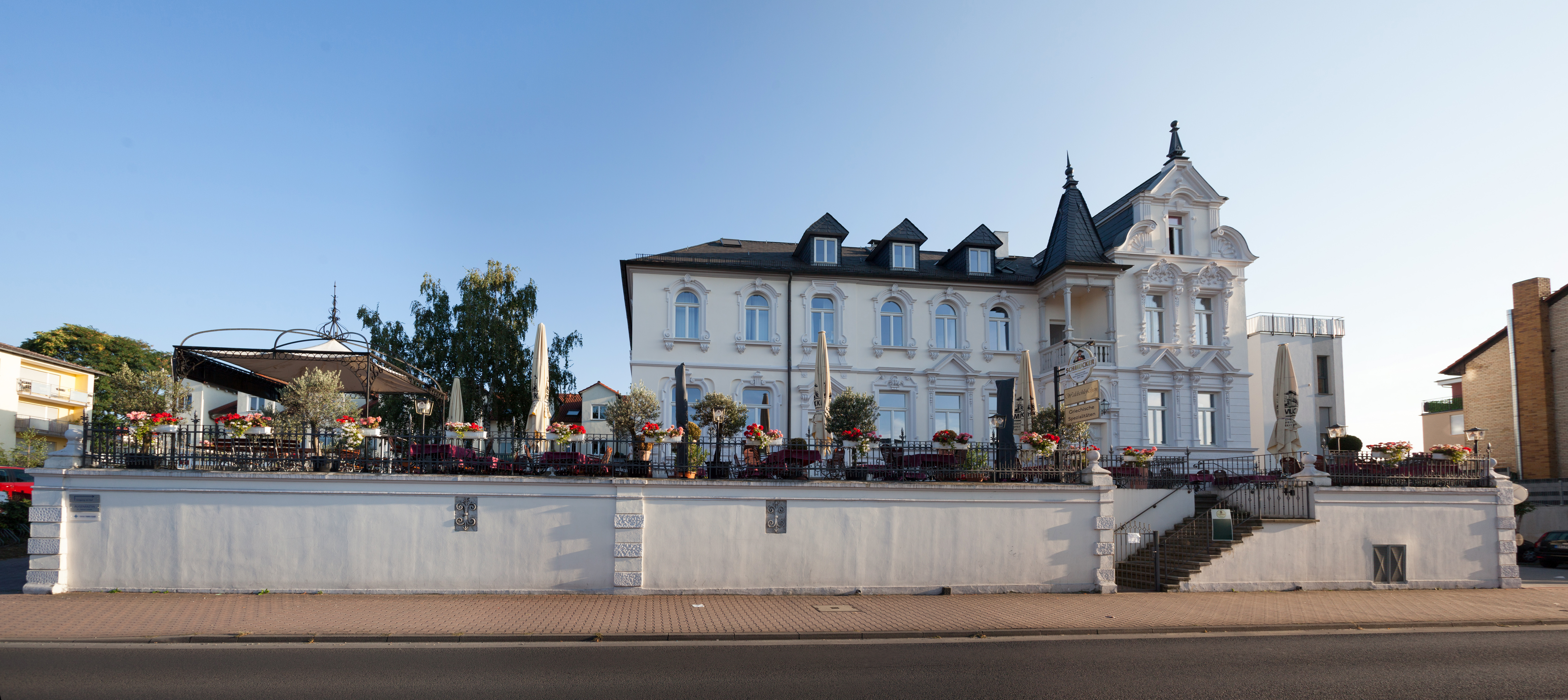
Former officers mess

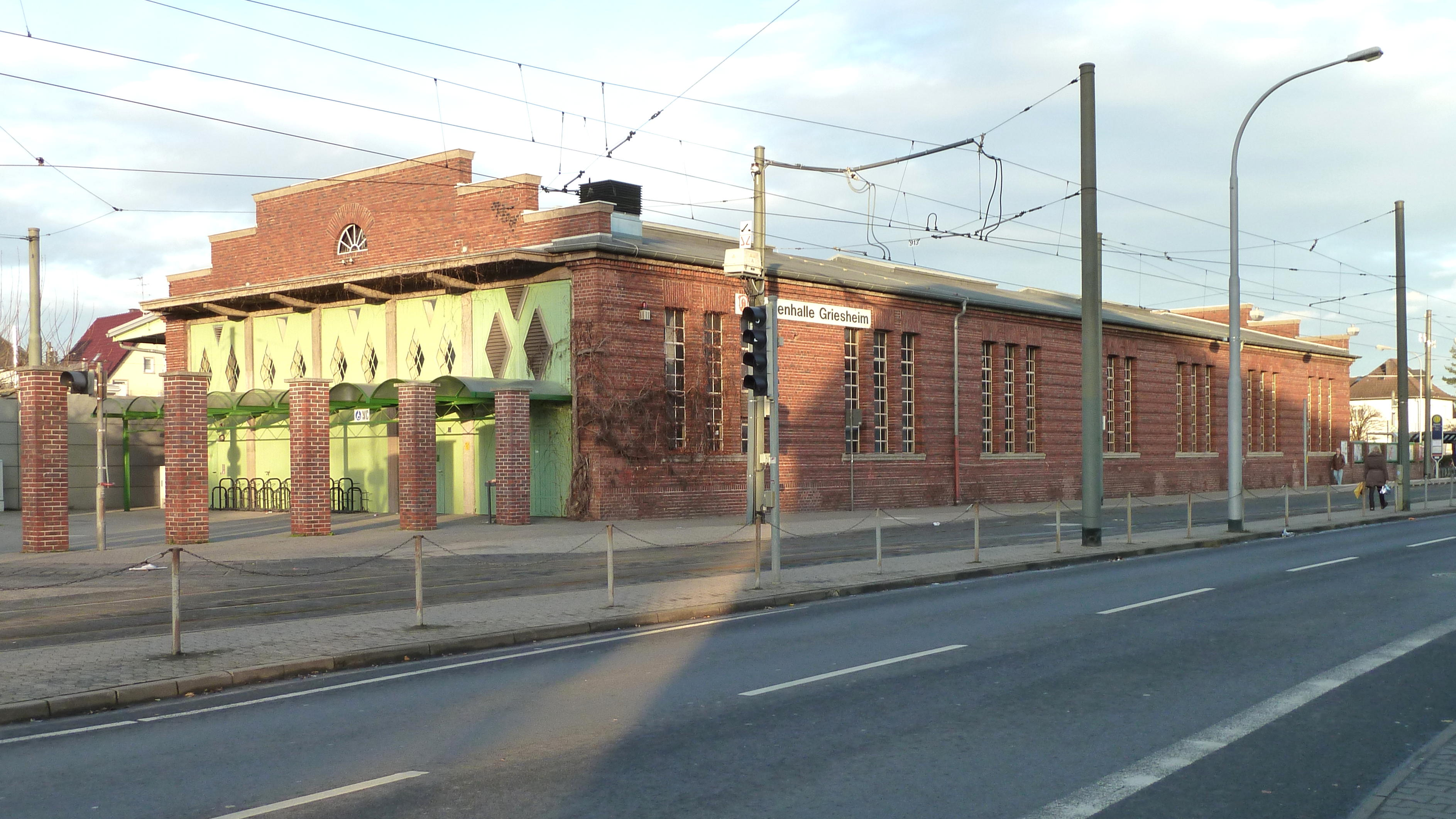
Former tram depot
