= August Euler =

19/20th-century German aviator and aeronautical engineer

- Born: 20 November 1868; Oelde, Germany
- Died: 1 July 1957 (aged 88); Feldberg, Germany
- Known for: Pioneer Aviator
- Aviation career
- Flight license: 31 December 1909

August Euler (20 November 1868 – 1 July 1957) was a pioneer German aviator, aircraft constructor and the holder of the first German pilot's license, issued in 1909. After the First World War, he became German Secretary of State for Air, until he retired in 1922.

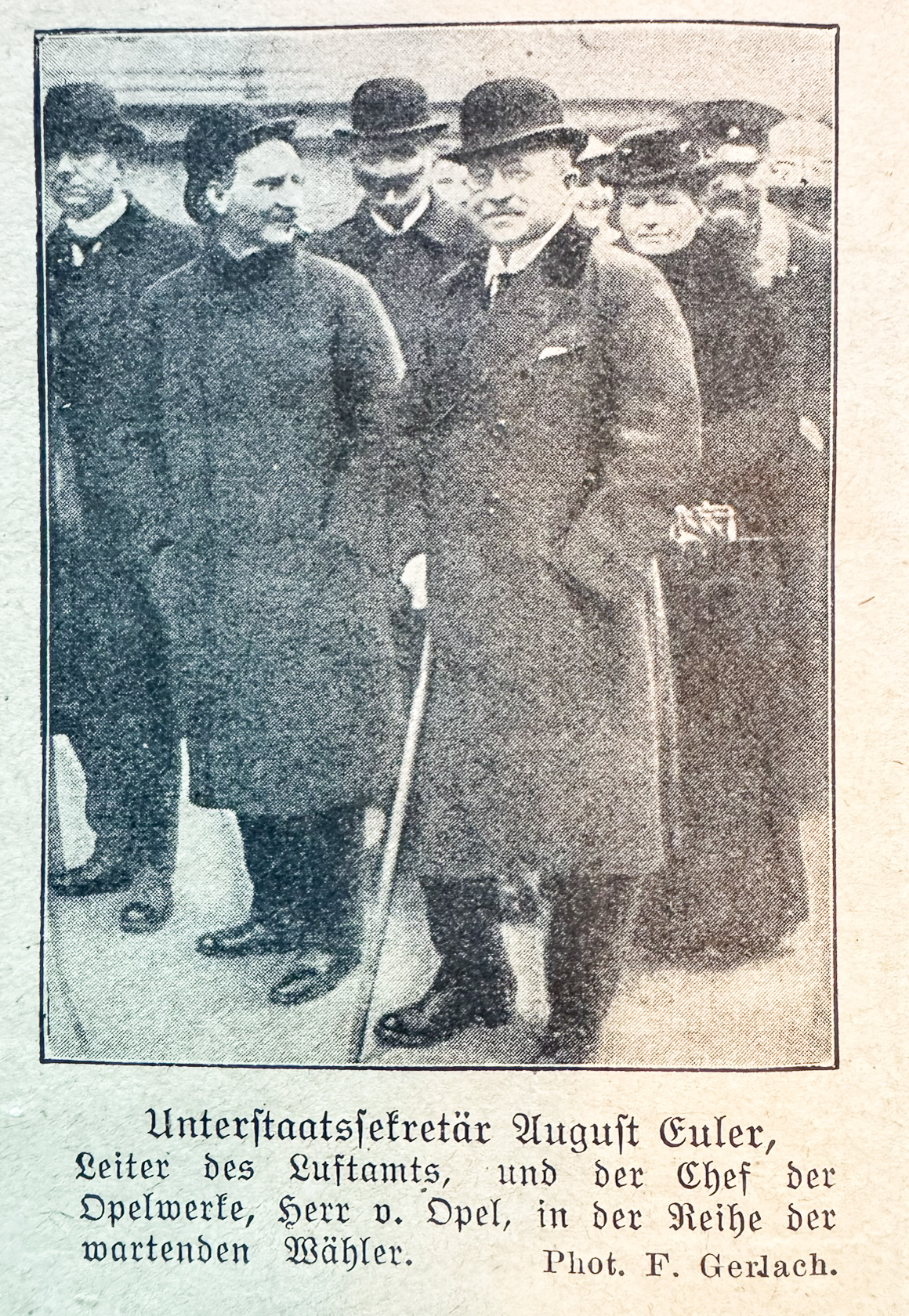
August Euler 1919 Undersecretary of the Air ministry

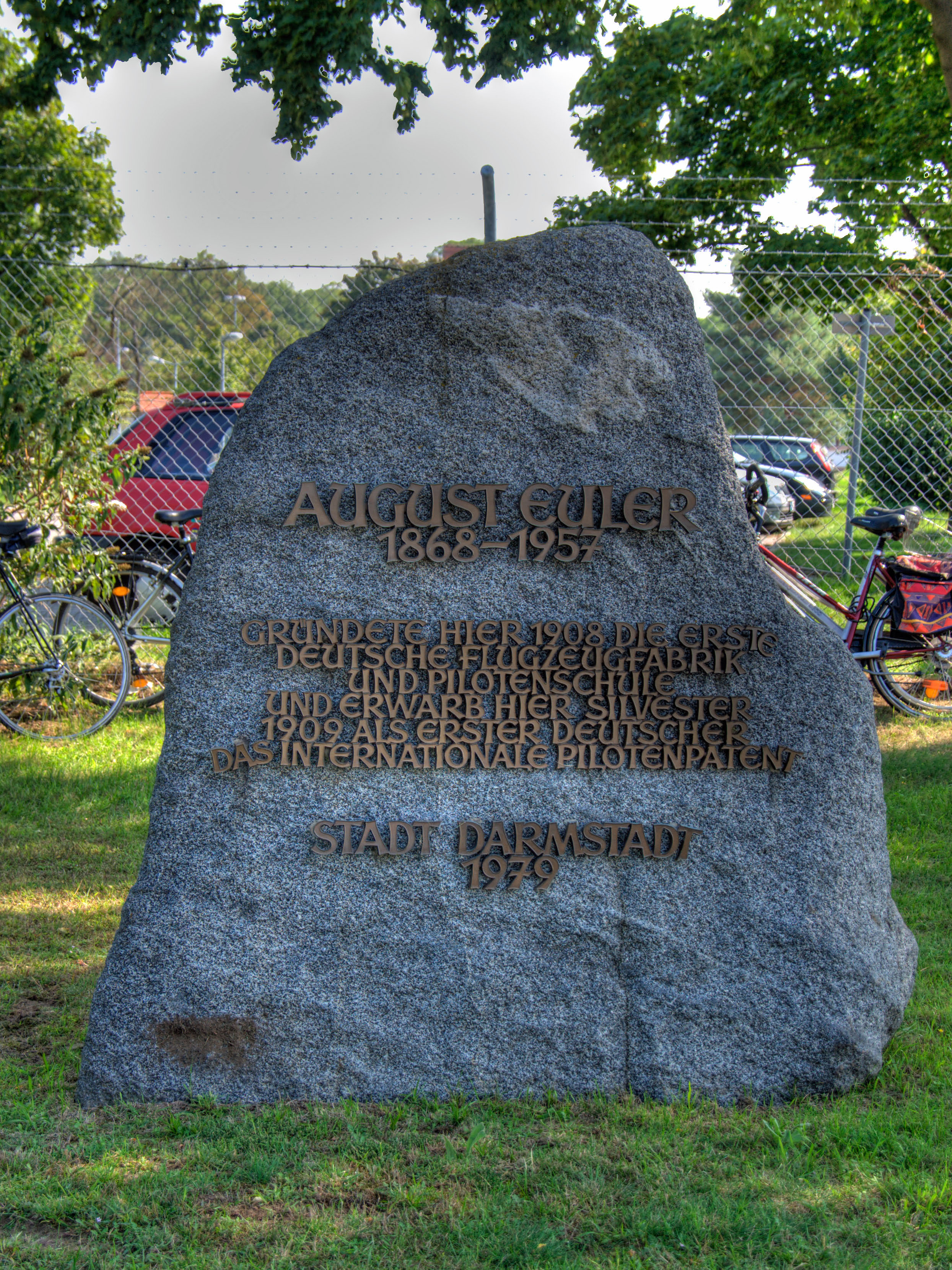
Memorial at August-Euler airport, Darmstadt-Griesheim

Euler was born at Oelde in Westphalia and was educated at Oelde and at public schools in Cologne and Aachen and from 1885 started a career in engineering. He worked for Seidel & Neumann, originally a sewing machine company, which later made cycles and motor cars. Euler took up cycle racing and then motor racing and became interested in aviation. In 1908 he started a company to build Voisin aircraft under licence. In February 1908 August Euler erected a building on the site of the Griesheim Airport, which he relocated from Mainz castle, costing him 2,400 Marks. In that building he began aircraft production. In 1910 he set a German flying duration record by staying airborne for 3hr 6min. 18sec On 31 December 1909 he obtained German Pilot's brevet No. 1 and started a flying school. Before the First World War he moved his factory to Frankfurt and helped set up a German aircraft manufacturers' association. He is credited with having conceived of the synchronization gear that allowed machine guns to fire between rotating propeller blades on German fighter aircraft. After the war he was appointed Secretary of State for Air with instructions to create a ministry for transportation, but with the restrictions of the Versailles Treaty they had little to do, and when the treaty was ratified in 1920 Euler resigned.

Euler built a house in the Black Forest on the Feldberg mountain where he lived in retirement until his death in 1957. Although his services were requested by the Nazi government during the Second World War he resisted due to his age and remained retired. He was associated with many of the country's motoring and aviation associations and received many honorary distinctions for his early work.

== Legacy ==
A street has been named in his honor in Frankfurt Bockenheim.
